= List of Phasmatidae genera =

This is a list of 176 genera in Phasmatidae, a family of walkingsticks in the order Phasmatodea.

== Phasmatidae genera ==
- Acanthograeffea ^{c g}
- Acanthomenexenus ^{c g}
- Acanthomima ^{c g}
- Acanthoxyla ^{c g}
- Achrioptera ^{c g}
- Acrophylla ^{c g}
- Agamemnon ^{c g}
- Anchiale ^{c g}
- Anophelepis ^{c g}
- Aploploides ^{c g}
- Aplopocranidium ^{c g}
- Apterograeffea ^{c g}
- Apteroplopus ^{c g}
- Argosarchus ^{c g}
- Arphax ^{c g}
- Asprenas ^{c g}
- Austrocarausius ^{c g}
- Baculofractum ^{c g}
- Baculonistria ^{c g}
- Brachyrtacus ^{c g}
- Breviphetes ^{c g}
- Caledoniophasma ^{c g}
- Canachus ^{c g}
- Carausius Stål, 1875^{c g b}
- Carlius ^{c g}
- Cephaloplopus ^{c g}
- Chondrostethus ^{c g}
- Cigarrophasma ^{c g}
- Cladomimus ^{c g}
- Cladomorphus ^{c g}
- Cladoxerus ^{c g}
- Clitarchus ^{c g}
- Cnipsomorpha ^{c g}
- Cnipsus ^{c g}
- Cotylosoma ^{c g}
- Cranidium ^{c g}
- Ctenomorpha ^{c g}
- Cuniculina ^{c g}
- Davidrentzia ^{c g}
- Denhama ^{c g}
- Diagoras ^{c g}
- Diapherodes ^{c g}
- Didymuria ^{c g}
- Dimorphodes ^{c g}
- Dryococelus ^{c g}
- Echetlus ^{c g}
- Echinothorax ^{c g}
- Ectentoria ^{c g}
- Elicius ^{c g}
- Entoria ^{c g}
- Epicharmus ^{c g}
- Erastus ^{c g}
- Erinaceophasma ^{c g}
- Erringtonia ^{c g}
- Eucarcharus ^{c g}
- Eupromachus ^{c g}
- Eurycantha ^{c g}
- Eurycnema ^{c g}
- Extatosoma ^{c g}
- Gigantophasma ^{c g}
- Glawiana ^{c g}
- Gongylopus ^{c g}
- Graeffea ^{c g}
- Greenia ^{c g}
- Guamuhaya ^{c g}
- Haplopus Burmeister, 1838^{i c g b}
- Hermagoras ^{c g}
- Hermarchus ^{c g}
- Hesperophasma ^{c g}
- Heterophasma ^{c g}
- Hirtuleius ^{c g}
- Hypocyrtus ^{c g}
- Hyrtacus ^{c g}
- Interphasma ^{c g}
- Jeremia ^{c g}
- Jeremiodes ^{c g}
- Labidiophasma ^{c g}
- Lamponius ^{c g}
- Leosthenes ^{c g}
- Leprocaulinus ^{c g}
- Lobofemora ^{c g}
- Lonchodes ^{c g}
- Lonchodiodes ^{c g}
- Lysicles ^{c g}
- Macrophasma ^{c g}
- Malandania ^{c g}
- Manduria ^{c g}
- Matutumetes ^{c g}
- Mauritiophasma ^{c g}
- Medaura ^{c g}
- Medauroidea ^{c g}
- Medauromorpha ^{c g}
- Megacrania ^{c g}
- Megalophasma ^{c g}
- Menexenus ^{c g}
- Mesentoria ^{c g}
- Metentoria ^{c g}
- Microcanachus ^{c g}
- Micropodacanthus ^{c g}
- Mithrenes ^{c g}
- Mnesilochus ^{c g}
- Monandroptera ^{c g}
- Monoiognosis ^{c g}
- Mortites ^{c g}
- Myronides ^{c g}
- Neopromachus ^{c g}
- Nesiophasma ^{c g}
- Nisyrus ^{c g}
- Onchestus ^{c g}
- Ophicrania ^{c g}
- Oreophasma ^{c g}
- Otocrania ^{c g}
- Otocraniella ^{c g}
- Papuacocelus ^{c g}
- Parabactridium ^{c g}
- Parabaculum ^{c g}
- Paracanachus ^{c g}
- Paracranidium ^{c g}
- Paractenomorpha ^{c g}
- Paracyphocrania ^{c g}
- Paraentoria ^{c g}
- Paraleiophasma ^{c g}
- Parapachymorpha ^{c g}
- Parapodacanthus ^{c g}
- Paraprisomera ^{c g}
- Paratropidoderus ^{c g}
- Parhaplopus ^{c g}
- Paronchestus ^{c g}
- Peloriana ^{c g}
- Pericentropsis ^{c g}
- Pericentrus ^{c g}
- Periphetes ^{c g}
- Pharnacia ^{c g}
- Phasma ^{c g}
- Phasmotaenia ^{c g}
- Phenacephorus ^{c g}
- Phenacocephalus ^{c g}
- Phobaeticus ^{c g}
- Phraortes ^{c g}
- Phryganistria ^{c g}
- Platycrana ^{c g}
- Podacanthus ^{c g}
- Prisomera ^{c g}
- Prosentoria ^{c g}
- Pseudoclitarchus ^{c g}
- Pseudososibia Ho, 2017^{g}
- Pseudostheneboea ^{c g}
- Pterinoxylus ^{c g}
- Ramulus ^{c g}
- Redtenbacherus ^{c g}
- Rhamphophasma ^{c g}
- Rhaphiderus ^{c g}
- Rhynchacris ^{c g}
- Sadyattes ^{c g}
- Spathomorpha ^{c g}
- Spinophetes ^{c g}
- Staelonchodes ^{c g}
- Stephanacris ^{c g}
- Stheneboea ^{c g}
- Symetriophasma ^{c g}
- Tainophasma ^{c g}
- Taraxippus ^{c g}
- Tepakiphasma ^{c g}
- Teruelphasma ^{c g}
- Thaumatobactron ^{c g}
- Tirachoidea ^{c g}
- Trapezaspis ^{c g}
- Tropidoderus ^{c g}
- Vasilissa ^{c g}
- Venupherodes ^{c g}
- Wattenwylia ^{c g}
- Woodmasonia ^{c g}
- Xenomaches ^{c g}
- Xenophasmina ^{c g}
- Xeroderus ^{c g}
- Xylodus ^{c g}

Data sources: i = ITIS, c = Catalogue of Life, g = GBIF, b = Bugguide.net
