= Nisyrus =

Nisyrus may mean:

- Nisyrus (insect), the genus of stick insects in subfamily Xeroderinae
- Nisyros#Christianity, the Christian diocese.
