= Lobofemora scheirei =

Scientific classification
- Kingdom: Animalia
- Phylum: Arthropoda
- Class: Insecta
- Order: Phasmatodea
- Family: Phasmatidae
- Subfamily: Clitumninae
- Tribe: Clitumnini
- Genus: Lobofemora
- Species: L. scheirei

Binomial name
- Lobofemora scheirei Bresseel & Constant, 2015

Species of stick insect

Lobofemora scheirei is a species of stick insects in the tribe Clitumnini. This species was found in the seasonal tropical forests of the Dong Nai Biosphere Reserve (type locality), which includes Cát Tiên National Park, Vietnam. It is named after the Belgian comedian, TV host and self-declared nerd Lieven Scheire.
