= Entoria (insect) =

Scientific classification
- Kingdom: Animalia
- Phylum: Arthropoda
- Clade: Pancrustacea
- Class: Insecta
- Order: Phasmatodea
- Family: Phasmatidae
- Subfamily: Clitumninae
- Tribe: Clitumnini
- Genus: Entoria; Stål, 1875

Genus of stick insects

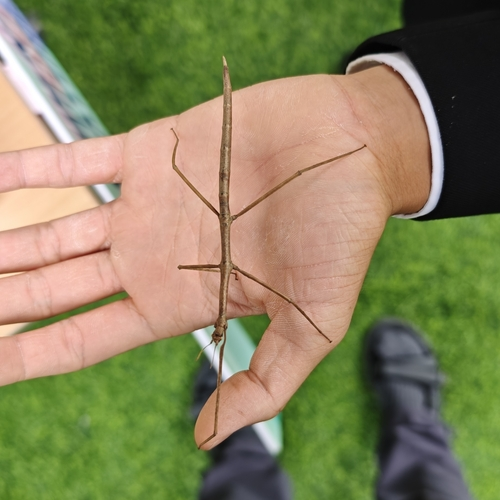
Entoria hei

Entoria is a genus of stick insects in the tribe Clitumnini, erected by Carl Stål in 1875. Species have been recorded from: China, Japan, Indochina and the Philippines.

== Species ==
The Phasmida Species File lists:

1. Entoria baishanzuensis Chen & He, 1995
2. Entoria banshoryoensis Shiraki, 1935
3. Entoria bituberculata Bi, 1993
4. Entoria continentalis Carl, 1913
5. Entoria cornuta Ho, 2013
6. Entoria denticornis Stål, 1875 - type species
7. Entoria domonensis Shiraki, 1935
8. Entoria formosana Shiraki, 1911
9. Entoria fujianensis Cai & Liu, 1990
10. Entoria fuzhouensis Cai & Liu, 1990
11. Entoria gracilis Bi, 1993
12. Entoria guangdongensis Ho, 2015
13. Entoria hainanensis Cai & Liu, 1990
14. Entoria hei Ho, 2013
15. Entoria heishidingensis Ho, 2015
16. Entoria humilis Bi, 1993
17. Entoria ishigakiensis Shiraki, 1935
18. Entoria japonica Shiraki, 1911
19. Entoria kiirunensis Shiraki, 1935
20. Entoria koshunensis Shiraki, 1935
21. Entoria laminata Cai & Liu, 1990
22. Entoria longiopercula Shiraki, 1935
23. Entoria magna Shiraki, 1911
24. Entoria miyakoensis Shiraki, 1935
25. Entoria nuda Brunner von Wattenwyl, 1907
26. Entoria shinchikuensis Shiraki, 1935
27. Entoria sichuanensis Cai & Liu, 1990
28. Entoria taihokuensis Shiraki, 1935
29. Entoria taitoensis Shiraki, 1935
30. Entoria takaoensis Shiraki, 1935
31. Entoria victoria Brock & Seow-Choen, 2000
32. Entoria wuyiensis Cai & Liu, 1990
33. Entoria wuzhishanense (Chen & Li, 2002)
