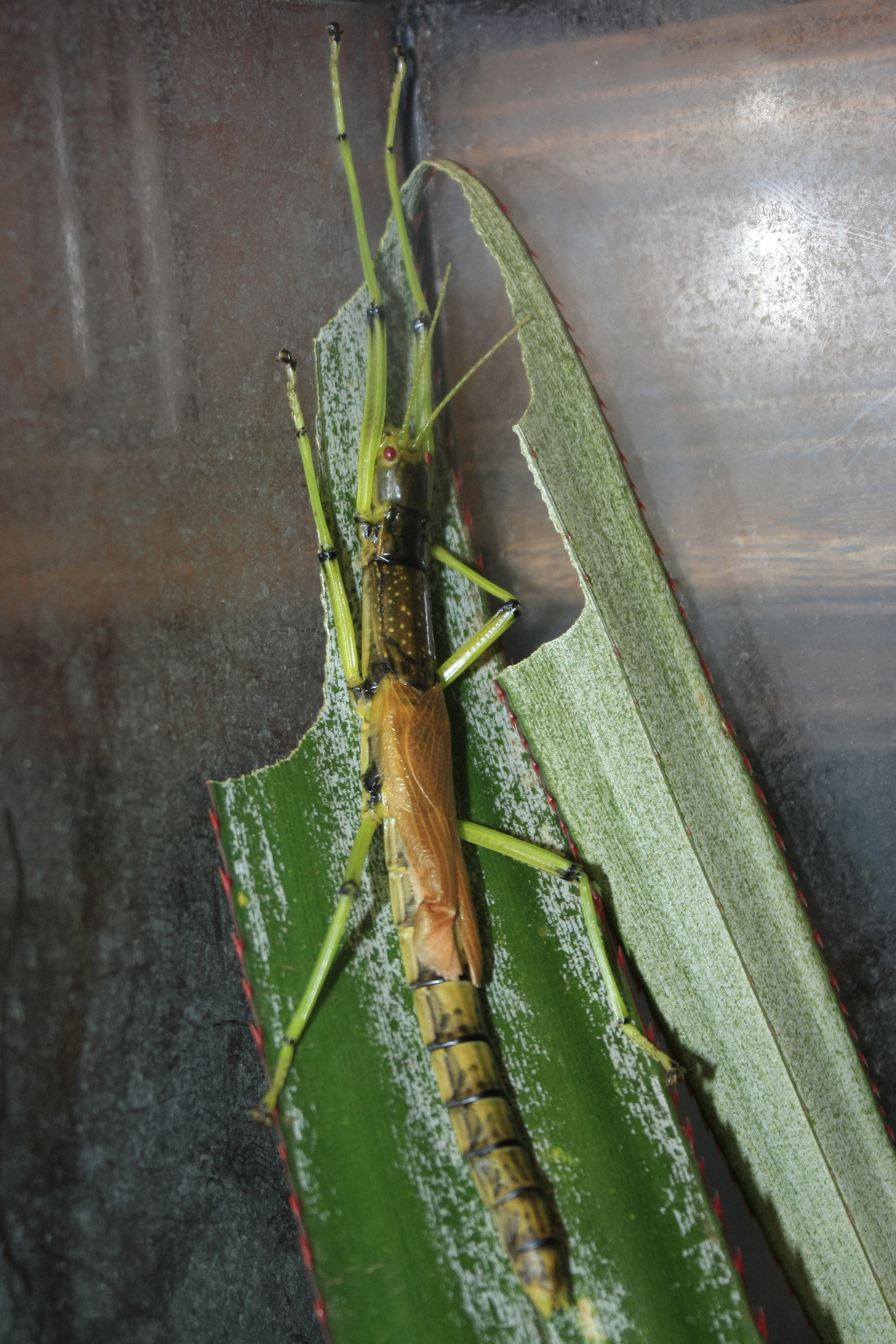
- Megacrania phelaus

Scientific classification
- Domain: Eukaryota
- Kingdom: Animalia
- Phylum: Arthropoda
- Class: Insecta
- Order: Phasmatodea
- Suborder: Euphasmatodea
- Infraorder: Anareolatae
- Family: Phasmatidae
- Subfamily: Megacraniinae; Hennemann, 2020

= Megacraniinae =

Subfamily of stick insects

The Megacraniinae are an anareolate subfamily of stick insects in the family Phasmatidae. Their known distribution includes Malesia and islands in the Pacific and Indian oceans. Several genera have been revised and were placed previously in the Platycraninae.

== Genera ==
The Phasmida Species File lists:

- Acanthograeffea Günther, 1932
- Apterograeffea Cliquennois & Brock, 2002
- Davidrentzia - monotypic D. valida Brock & Hasenpusch, 2007
- Erastus Redtenbacher, 1908
- Graeffea Brunner von Wattenwyl, 1868
- Megacrania Kaup, 1871
- Ophicrania Kaup, 1871
- Xenomaches Kirby, 1896 - monotypic Xenomaches incommodus (Butler, 1876)
