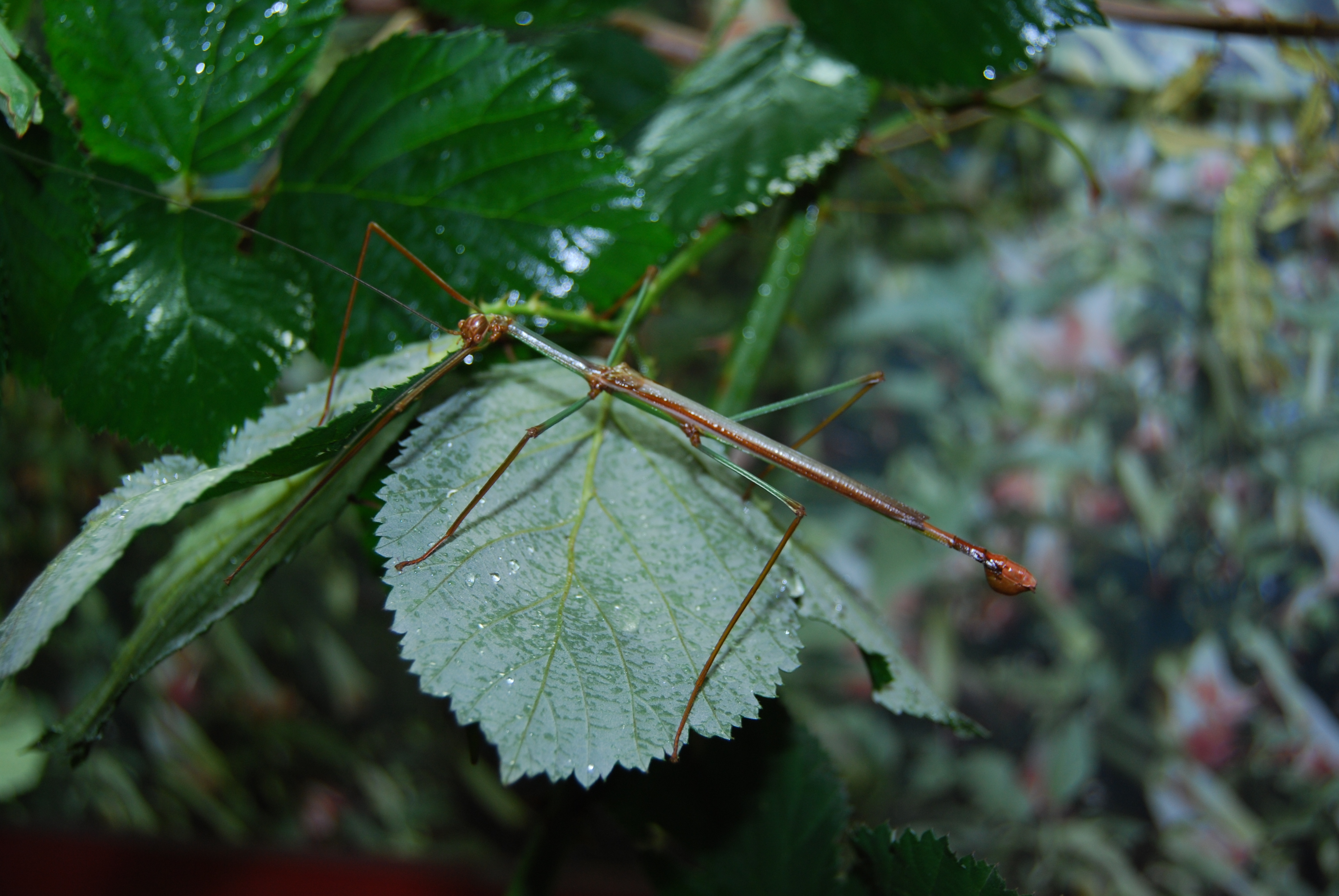
- Cranidium gibbosum male

Scientific classification
- Kingdom: Animalia
- Phylum: Arthropoda
- Class: Insecta
- Order: Phasmatodea
- Family: Phasmatidae
- Subfamily: Cladomorphinae
- Genus: Cranidium; Westwood, 1843
- Species: C. gibbosum

Binomial name
- Cranidium gibbosum Westwood, 1843

Synonyms
- Phasmilliger Carrera, 1960

= Cranidium =

Genus of true bugs

Cranidium is an monotypic genus of stick insects in the monotypic tribe Cranidiini. The single species Cranidium gibbosum has been recorded from northern Brazil, French Guiana, and Surinam.

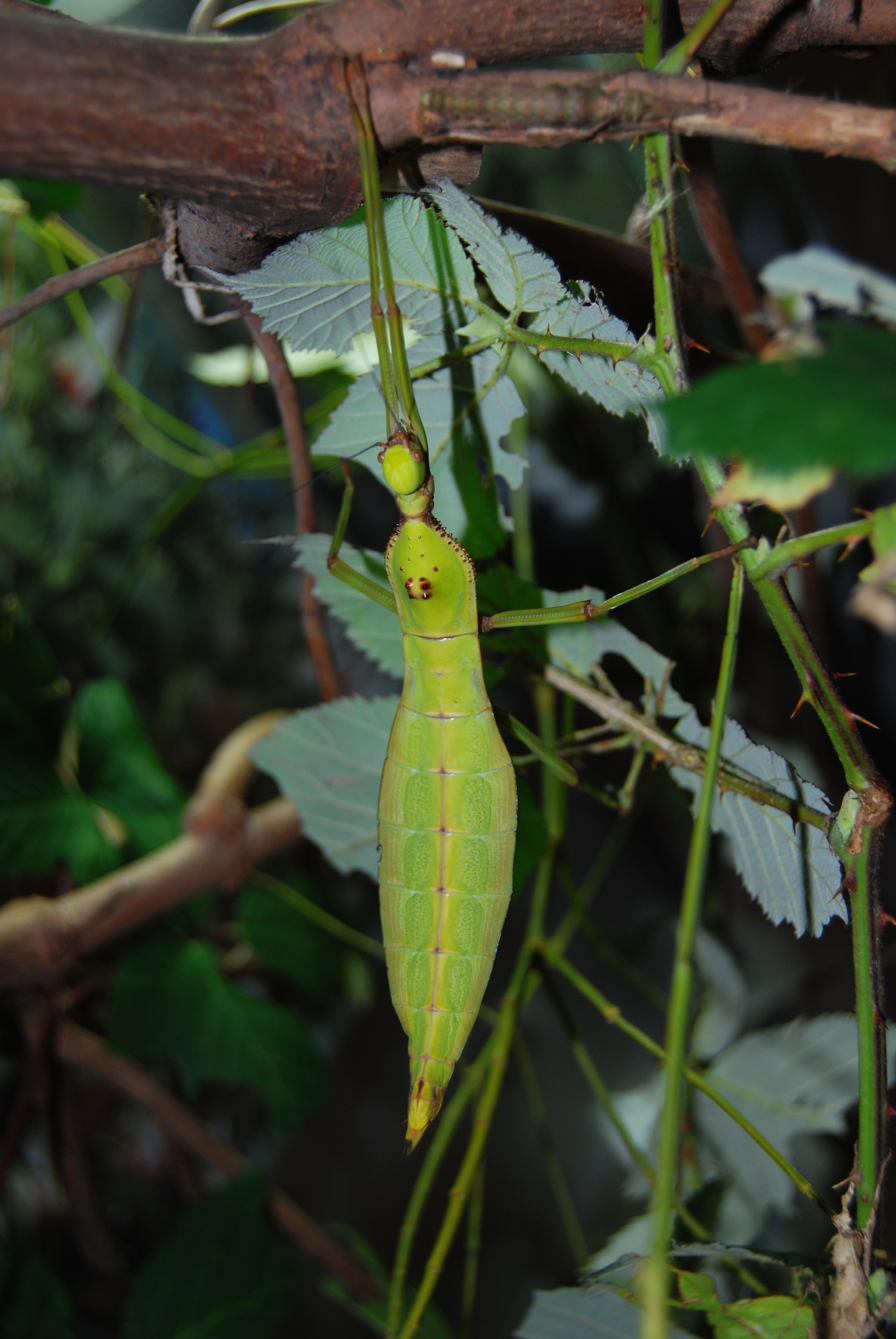
C. gibbosum female
