= Cuniculina cunicula =

Scientific classification
- Kingdom: Animalia
- Phylum: Arthropoda
- Class: Insecta
- Order: Phasmatodea
- Family: Phasmatidae
- Genus: Cuniculina
- Species: C. cunicula

Binomial name
- Cuniculina cunicula (Westwood, 1859)

Synonyms
- Bacillus ceylonicus (Saussure, 1868); Bacillus cuniculus Westwood, 1859; Bacillus hyphereon Westwood, 1859; Bacillus scytale Bates, 1865; Baculum acutecornutum (Brunner von Wattenwyl, 1907); Baculum attingens (Brunner von Wattenwyl, 1907); Baculum cuniculus (Westwood, 1859); Baculum grallator (Bates, 1865); Baculum hyphereon (Westwood, 1859); Baculum insolens (Brunner von Wattenwyl, 1907); Baculum inversecornutum (Brunner von Wattenwyl, 1907); Baculum laevissimum (Brunner von Wattenwyl, 1907); Baculum rivalis (Brunner von Wattenwyl, 1907); Baculum scytale (Bates, 1865); Clitumnus attingens Brunner von Wattenwyl, 1907; Clitumnus cuniculus (Westwood, 1859); Clitumnus hyphereon (Westwood, 1859); Clitumnus rivalis Brunner von Wattenwyl, 1907; Cuniculina acute-cornuta Brunner von Wattenwyl, 1907; Cuniculina cuniculus (Westwood, 1859); Cuniculina insolens Brunner von Wattenwyl, 1907; Cuniculina inverse-cornuta Brunner von Wattenwyl, 1907; Cuniculina laevissima Brunner von Wattenwyl, 1907; Gratidia hyphereon (Westwood, 1859); Lonchodes ceylonicus Saussure, 1868; Lonchodes grallator Bates, 1865; Ramulus ceylonicus (Saussure, 1868); Ramulus hyphereon (Westwood, 1859); Ramulus rivalis (Brunner von Wattenwyl, 1907)

Species of stick insect

Cuniculina cunicula is a species of phasmid or stick insect of the genus Cuniculina. It is found in India and Sri Lanka.
