= Neomedaura =

Scientific classification
- Kingdom: Animalia
- Phylum: Arthropoda
- Clade: Pancrustacea
- Class: Insecta
- Order: Phasmatodea
- Family: Phasmatidae
- Subfamily: Clitumninae
- Tribe: Medaurini
- Genus: Neomedaura; Ho, 2020

Genus of stick insects

Neomedaura is currently a monotypic genus of Asian stick insects in the tribe Medaurini, erected by G.W.C. Ho in 2020. To date, species have been recorded from Vietnam and China.

== Species ==
The Phasmida Species File currently includes:

1. Neomedaura arguta (Chen & He, 2008): Yunnan province, previously placed in genus Pachymorpha
2. Neomedaura yokdonensis Ho, 2020: type species named after Yok Don National Park in Đắk Lắk Province, where the type specimens were collected.
