= Cuniculina obnoxia =

Scientific classification
- Kingdom: Animalia
- Phylum: Arthropoda
- Class: Insecta
- Order: Phasmatodea
- Family: Phasmatidae
- Genus: Cuniculina
- Species: C. obnoxia

Binomial name
- Cuniculina obnoxia Brunner von Wattenwyl, 1907

Synonyms
- Baculum obnoxium (Brunner von Wattenwyl, 1907); Ramulus obnoxius (Brunner von Wattenwyl, 1907)

Species of stick insect

Cuniculina obnoxia, is a species of phasmid or stick insect of the genus Cuniculina. It is found in Sri Lanka.
