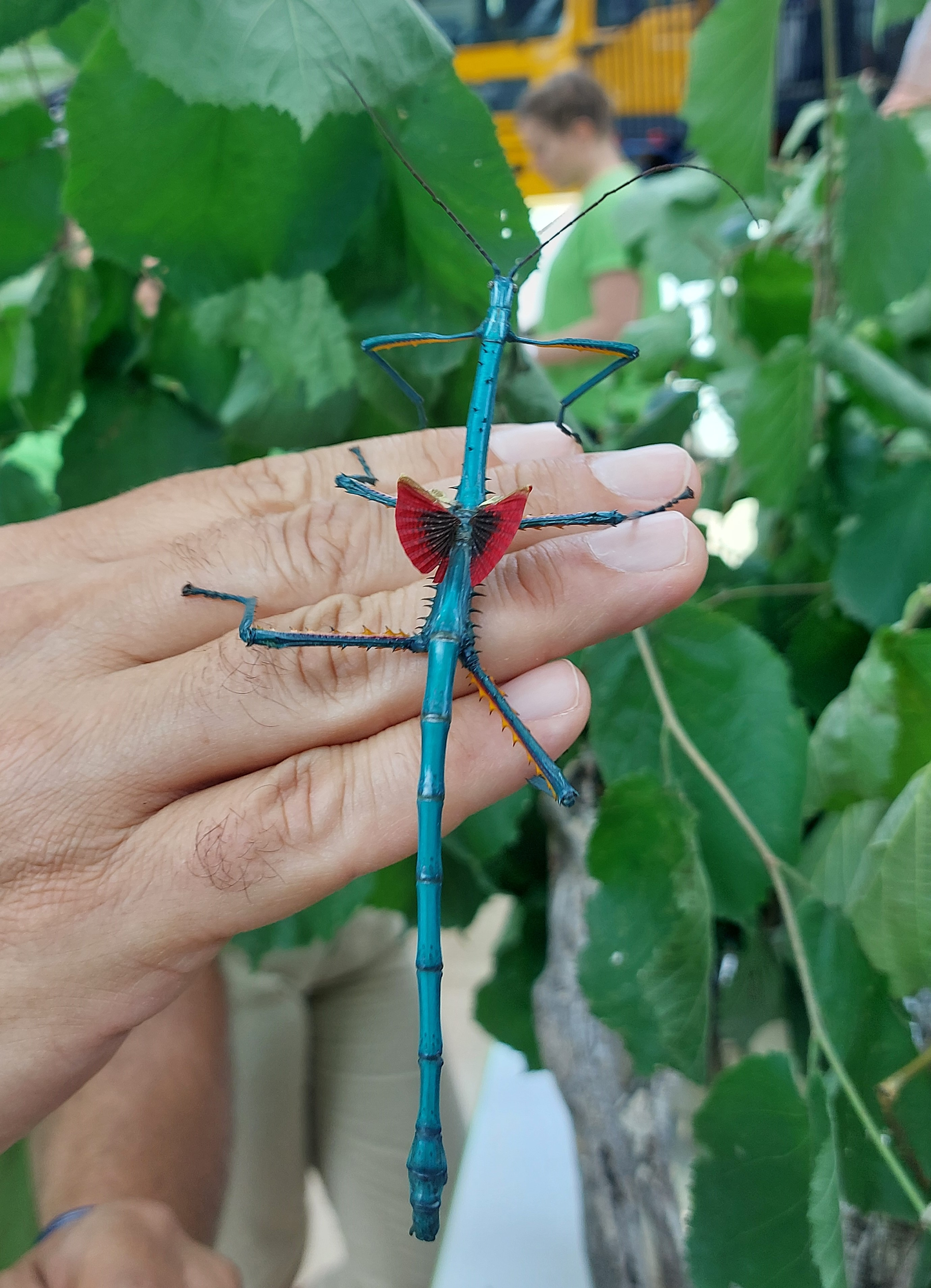

Scientific classification
- Kingdom: Animalia
- Phylum: Arthropoda
- Class: Insecta
- Order: Phasmatodea
- Family: Phasmatidae
- Genus: Achrioptera
- Species: A. manga

Binomial name
- Achrioptera manga Glaw, Hawlitschek, Dunz, Goldberg & Bradler, 2019

= Achrioptera manga =

Species of stick insect

Achrioptera manga is a species of phasmid or stick insect of the genus Achrioptera, found in Madagascar and the Comoros Archipelago. Stick insects usually blend into their background, but the male A. manga is blue, standing out against the surrounding foliage. It is one of the largest insects, able to reach lengths of 24 centimetres (9.4 in).

== Taxonomy ==
The epithet "manga" is derived from the Malagasy language adjective for "blue".

A. manga, specimens of which were first collected in 2007, was misidentified as a regional variation of Achrioptera fallax until A. manga was determined to be a different species by a study in 2019. They are most closely related to A. fallax, their sister taxa in a phylogenetic tree assembled by the same study.

== Description ==
Female A. manga are distinct from most other Achrioptera species by the presence of a pair of small spines on their prosternum. Females have alae shorter than 30 millimetres (1.2 in) with an anal region colored blackish with indistinct reticulation and bordered by a dark red band. They do not have spines on their pronotum, but can have up to ten on their heads, usually two and rarely four on their second sternum segment or sternum II, up to three on their sternum III, and none on their sternum IV. They also have a reddish base of their head and thorax spines. Females have bodies 20–24 centimetres (7.9–9.4 in) long and short, wine-red antennae.

Males have a blue dorsal body coloration and orange ventral parts of their femora. They do not have spines on their pronotum, prosternum and sterna IV–VI. The anal region of their alae is gray and light red to rosy farther away from the alae, with dark reticulations. Like females, they also have antennae. Unlike females, they have slimmer and shorter bodies, at 13–14.5 centimetres (5.1–5.7 in) long.

=== Similar species ===
A. manga closely resemble A. fallax, but are distinguishable by their blue coloration as opposed to the green coloration of A. fallax. Females of A. manga also have fewer spines on their body than females of A. fallax. Their eggs are also thinner. Genetically, they have different mitochondrial and nuclear genes.

== Habitat and distribution ==
A. manga is only known to occur in the far north of Madagascar, within the Montagne des Français and the Foret d'Orangea. Both areas have deciduous dry forest cover. Although both regions used to be threatened by heavy logging, A. manga is likely not Critically Endangered because Montagne des Français became protected in 2016, and Foret d'Orangea followed suit soon after.

== Life cycle ==
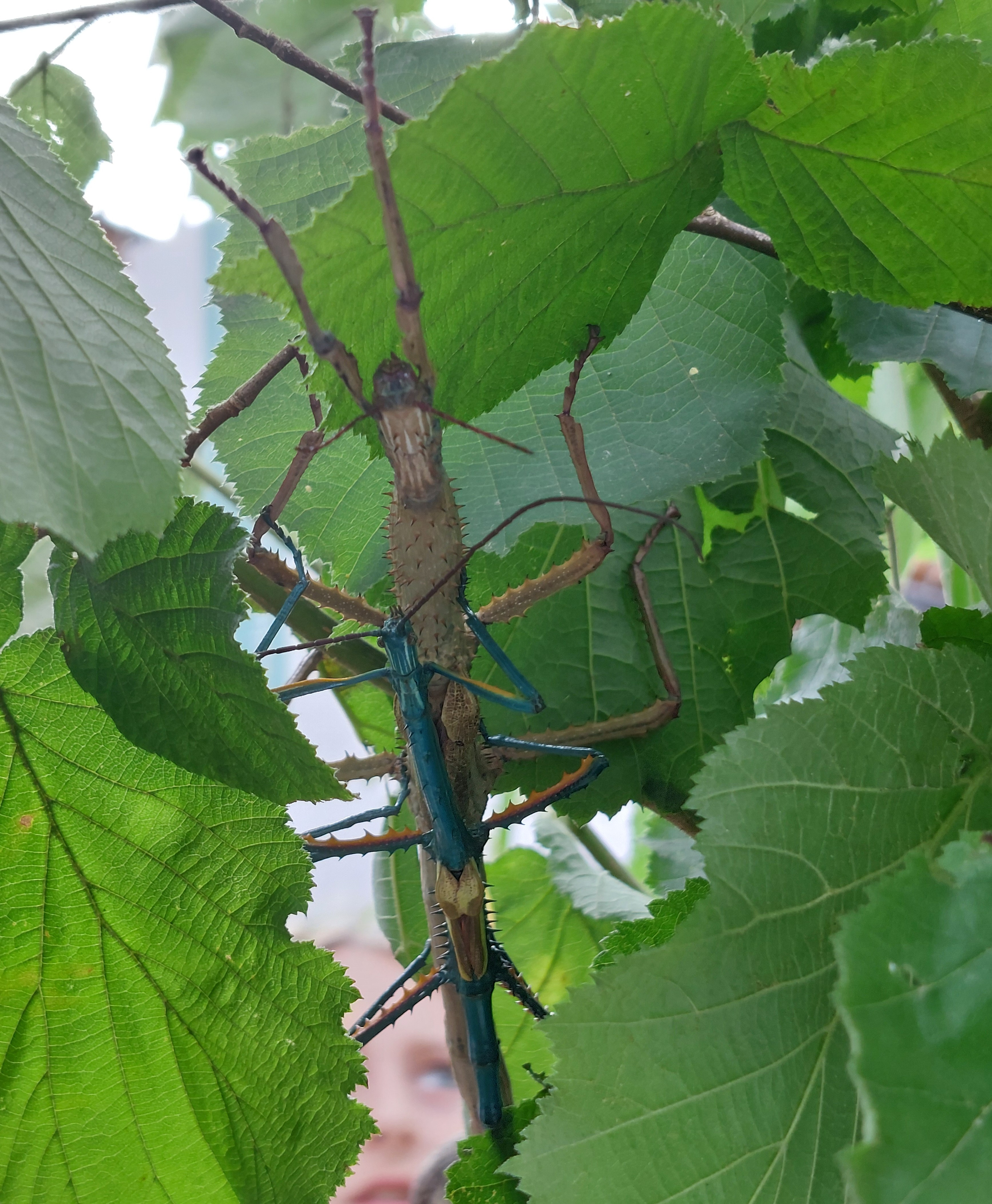
Male (blue) on female (brown)

These creatures lay eggs as a means of reproduction. In captivity, eggs of the A. manga generally hatch 120–140 days after being laid by the females and incubated at room temperature. Specimens of both sexes reach maturity 4.5–5 months after hatching, males developing their distinctive blue coloration in a week.

== Behavior ==
Achrioptera manga open and rub their alae (second pair of wings) to produce stridulating noises when threatened or disturbed. A. manga, like other stick insects, also have neck glands that produce repellent substances to dissuade predation upon them.

=== Diet ===
In captivity, A. manga have been observed to readily consume leaves of bramble (Rubus spp.), Salal (Gaultheria shallon), oak (Quercus spp.), Eucalyptus, and raspberry (Rubus idaeus).

=== Reproduction ===
A. manga reproduces sexually. Males will begin making mating attempts only after their blue coloration develops, suggesting their coloring serves the purpose of attracting a mate.
