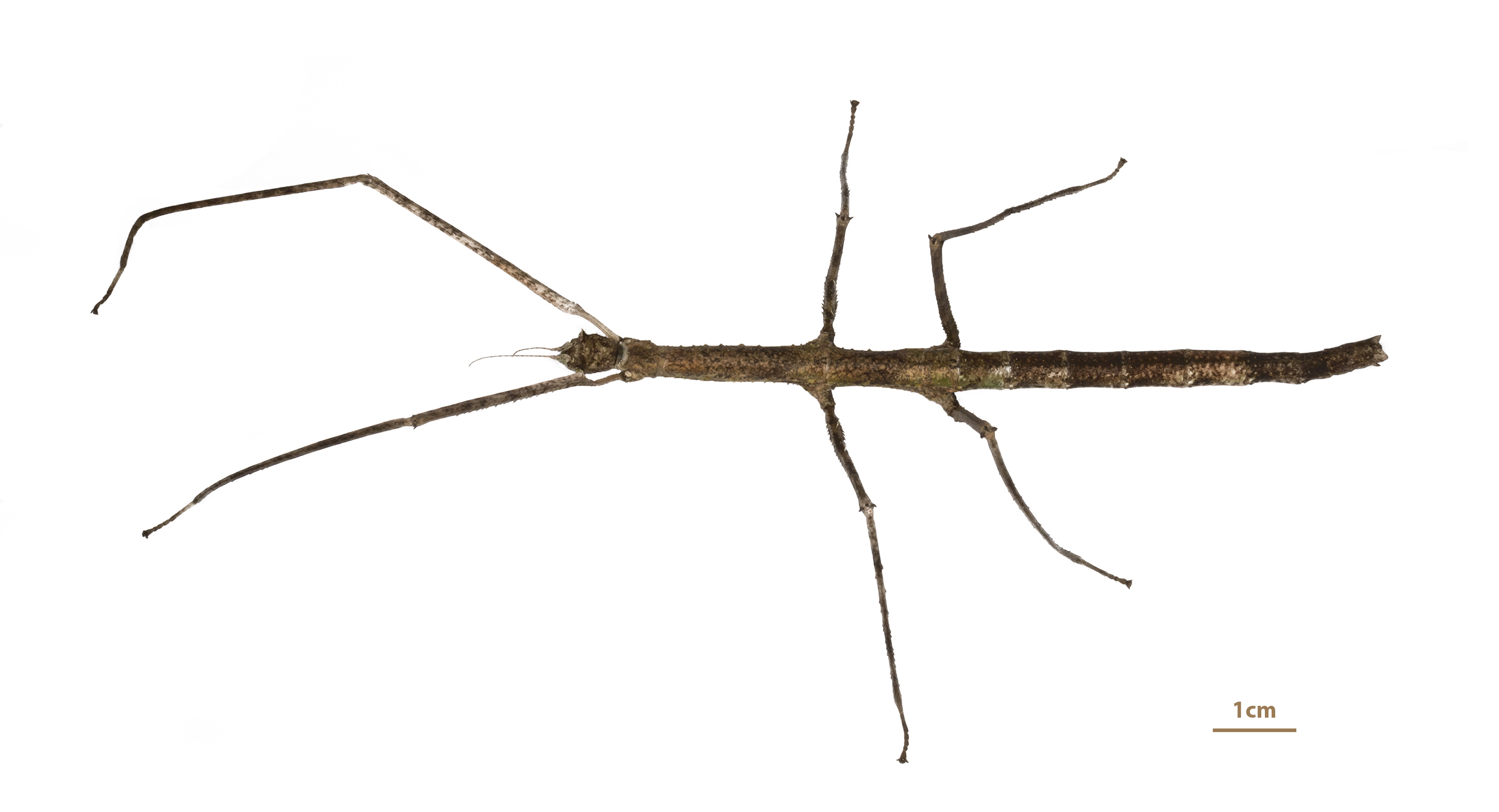
- Vietnamese walkingstick

Scientific classification
- Kingdom: Animalia
- Phylum: Arthropoda
- Class: Insecta
- Order: Phasmatodea
- Family: Phasmatidae
- Subfamily: Clitumninae
- Tribe: Medaurini
- Genus: Medauroidea
- Species: M. extradentata

Binomial name
- Medauroidea extradentata Brunner von Wattenwyl, 1907

= Medauroidea extradentata =

Species of insect

Medauroidea extradentata, commonly known as the Vietnamese or Annam walking stick, is a species of the family Phasmatidae. They originate in Vietnam and are found in tropical forests there. They eat a variety of foliage, though in captivity they commonly eat blackberry bramble, hawthorn, oak, red maple, and roses.

== Physical characteristics ==
Vietnamese walking sticks are approximately 100–120 mm (4-5 inches) in length. Their heads are oval-shaped with thread-like antennae. Their chewing mouthparts are specially adapted for eating plant material, opening horizontally instead of vertically. Adult walking sticks can be many varieties of brown. Newborns are a lighter tan color and smooth regardless of sex. During adolescence and after molting, they will turn green. Like some species of lizards, their legs can fall off due to stress, if being held (by a predator or an object) or when molting. These legs grow back (usually after 1 or 2 molts). Unlike other types of walking sticks, neither male nor female Vietnamese walking sticks have wings. Males and females have small differences in appearance. Males have longer antennae and their bodies tend to be thinner and smoother. Females have two small horns on the top of their heads, shorter antennae. On the body, there are small bumps along the thorax and her legs have small points that mimic the appearance of thorns.

== Reproduction ==
Medauroidea extradentata is mainly parthenogenetic, meaning they are asexual, making males very rare in the species. The female drops hundreds of eggs onto the forest floor, these eggs hatch in a few months. The eggs of this species are mottled with black and white and capped with black.

== Life cycle ==
The Vietnamese walking stick is short-lived, living between 5–7 months. Nymphs look nearly identical to their parents except in size. They molt about 6 times before they become adults (males 5 times, females 6). At 3 months of age (after the last molting), they become able to reproduce. Their main predators are birds and small mammals, though their camouflage helps them combat this.
