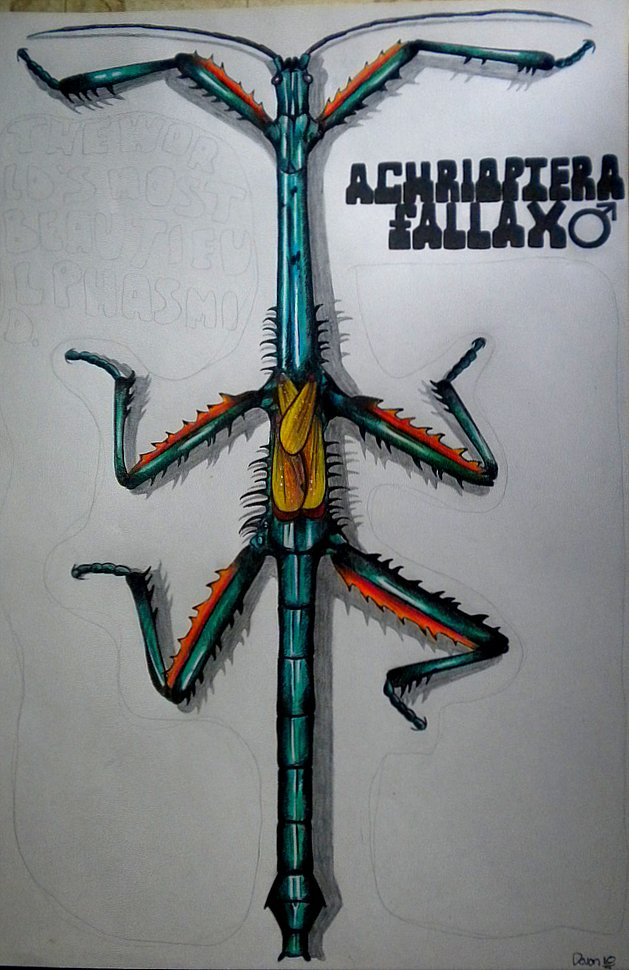
- Male Achrioptera fallax

Scientific classification
- Kingdom: Animalia
- Phylum: Arthropoda
- Class: Insecta
- Order: Phasmatodea
- Family: Phasmatidae
- Genus: Achrioptera
- Species: A. fallax

Binomial name
- Achrioptera fallax Coquerel 1861

= Achrioptera fallax =

Species of stick insect

Achrioptera fallax is a stick insect species found in Madagascar. It has frequently been confused with A. manga, a species that only was scientifically described in 2019; for example, captive stock of "A. fallax" is generally A. manga.

== Description ==
Both sexes are brachypterous (incapable of flight) and have small reduced wings. The males are a bright electric blue (with greenish tints) and have two rows of reddish orange spines along the edges of the femur. There are also dark colored spines along the sides and underneath the thorax. The forewings are a bright yellow; the hind wings have a yellow ridge and are primarily red with a black center. The male's abdomen tip finishes like a club tail. The 7th and 8th tergum (abdominal segments) both extend outwards along the sides, giving it the gradual shape of a hexagon. The 9th tergite is like the rest of the abdomen but has a pair of cerci for mating. Cerci are like claspers (as seen in dragonflies) that help the male grasp the female during copulation. Females have a duller coloration. They are a light brown with red spines covering the entire thorax, as well as the top of the head, where males lack spines. The femur has spines on the edges but lacks the bright colors of the male's. There are a few patches of light cyan on the coxa, the inner part of the femur and sometimes the head. The only difference separating the female's wings from the male's is that their yellow pigment is not at all as pronounced. The female's abdomen ends in a point (because of her ovipositor) rather than finishing like a club. Both male and female possess whitish stripes along the top and sides of the head. The male grows up to 13 cm in length while the female is much bigger and can grow up to 18, 5 cm in length.

== Diet ==
Their diet in the wild is unknown but in captivity they mainly feed on bramble, raspberry, eucalyptus, and oak.

== Reproduction ==
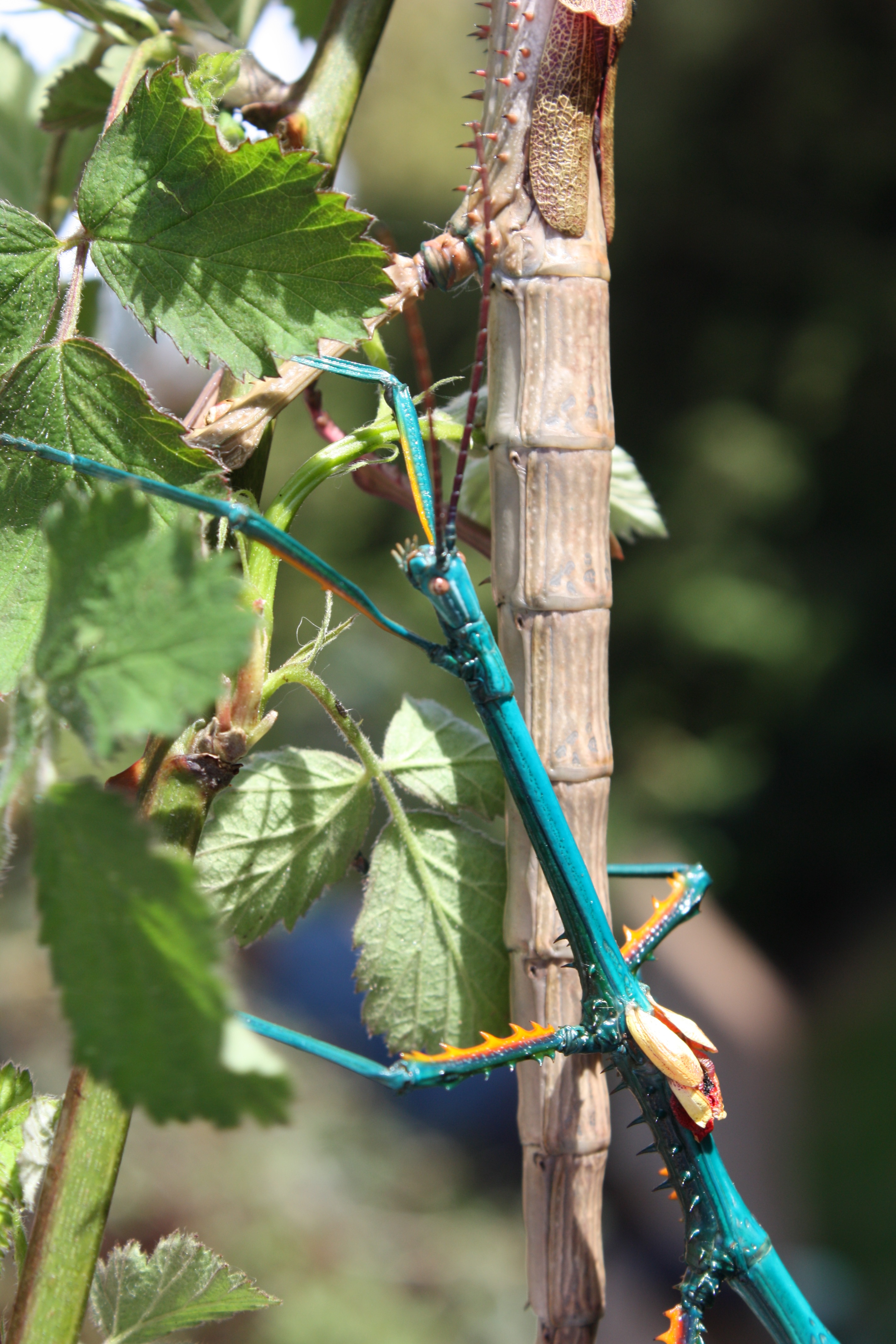
Portrait of male and partial view of a female in the background

Both sexes of A. fallax are required to reproduce. The female lays eggs in the soil. These eggs are then incubated for six to nine months.

Temperature: In captivity for adults, the temperature should be in between 24 °C to 28 °C. For eggs, the temperature should be around 18 °C to 25 °C. The ova that are in the soil should be sprayed with water once daily.

Humidity: The humidity should be from 50% to 60%. The cage should be well ventilated A damp cloth at the bottom of the cage is recommended in order to keep moisture in the phasmid's surroundings. If there isn't enough moisture, the phasmid could have trouble molting (breaking through its old skin) and could possibly die.

Life span: Based on captive bred experience lifespan around 8–10 months from hatching – around 3–4 months as adults. Longevity in the wild not known.
