= Spinoparapachymorpha =

Scientific classification
- Domain: Eukaryota
- Kingdom: Animalia
- Phylum: Arthropoda
- Class: Insecta
- Order: Phasmatodea
- Family: Phasmatidae
- Subfamily: Clitumninae
- Tribe: Medaurini
- Genus: Spinoparapachymorpha; Ho, 2021

Genus of stick insects

External image
- Images at iNaturalist

Spinoparapachymorpha is a genus of stick insects in the tribe Medaurini, erected by G.W.C. Ho in 2021. Species have been recorded from: China, Laos, Myanmar, Thailand and Vietnam.

== Species ==
The Phasmida Species File lists:

1. Spinoparapachymorpha daoyingi (Ho, 2014)
2. Spinoparapachymorpha jinpingensis (Ho, 2017)
3. Spinoparapachymorpha pseudospinosa (Ho, 2020)
4. Spinoparapachymorpha sinica (Ho, 2017) - type species
5. Spinoparapachymorpha spinosa (Brunner von Wattenwyl, 1893)
6. Spinoparapachymorpha tetracantha (Chen & He, 2001)
7. Spinoparapachymorpha xishuangbannaensis (Ho, 2014)
