= Pterulina =

Scientific classification
- Domain: Eukaryota
- Kingdom: Animalia
- Phylum: Arthropoda
- Class: Insecta
- Order: Phasmatodea
- Family: Phasmatidae
- Subfamily: Clitumninae
- Tribe: Clitumnini
- Genus: Pterulina; Bresseel & Constant, 2020

Genus of stick insects

External image
- Images and paper at Researchgate

Pterulina is a genus of stick insects in the tribe Clitumnini, erected by Bresseel & Constant in 2020. To date, species have been recorded from Vietnam only.

== Species ==
The Phasmida Species File lists:

1. Pterulina distinctissima (Redtenbacher, 1908) - type species (as Sipyloidea distinctissima Redtenbacher; locality southern Vietnam)
2. Pterulina simoensi Bresseel & Constant, 2020
