= Baculomia =

Scientific classification
- Kingdom: Animalia
- Phylum: Arthropoda
- Class: Insecta
- Order: Phasmatodea
- Family: Phasmatidae
- Subfamily: Clitumninae
- Tribe: Clitumnini
- Genus: Baculomia; Bresseel & Constant, 2019

Genus of stick insects

External image
- Image at iNaturalist

Baculomia is a genus of stick insects in the tribe Clitumnini, erected by Bresseel & Constant in 2019. Species have been recorded from Thailand and Vietnam.

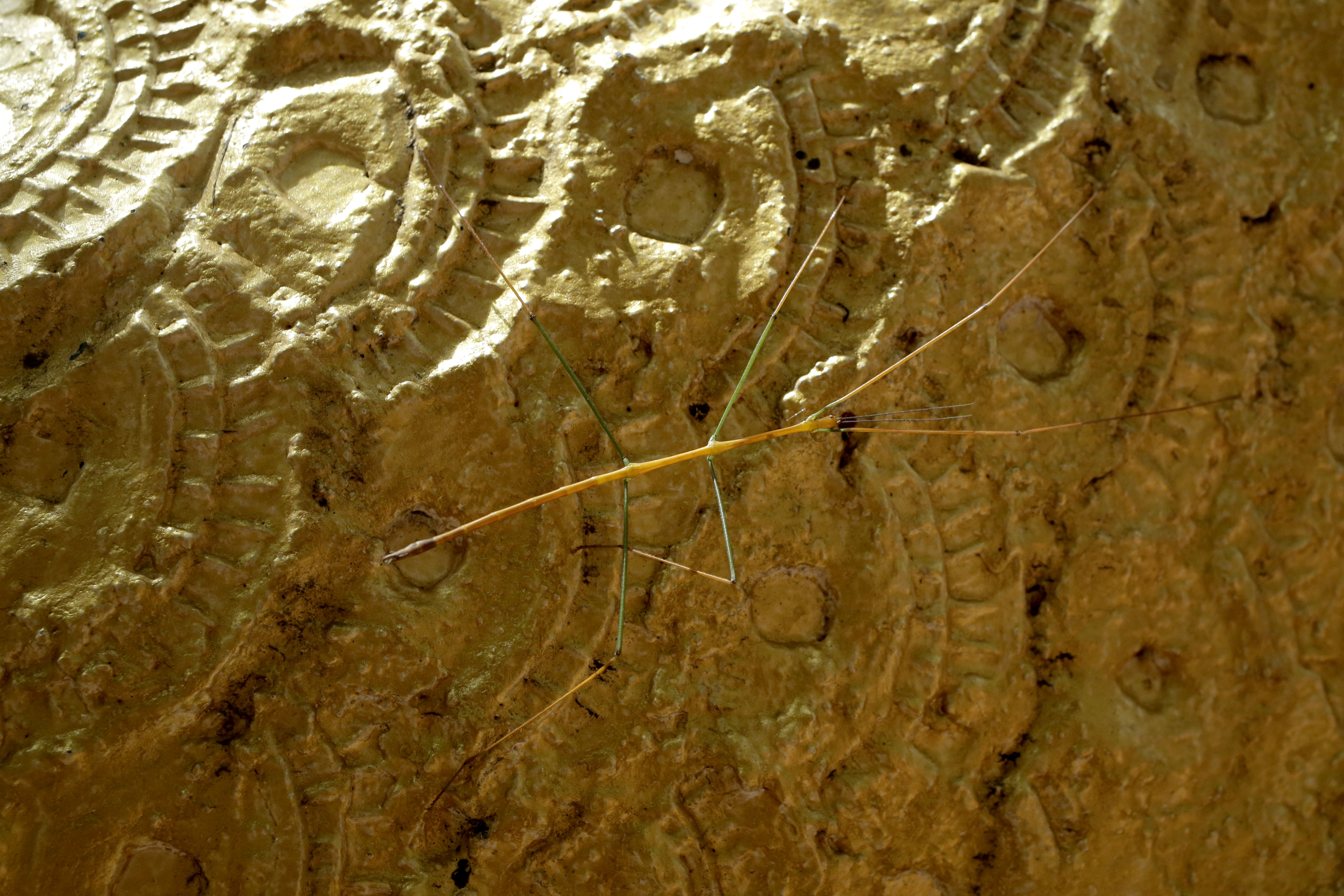
Baculomia siamensis, Chiangmai, Wat Phra That Doi Kham.

== Species ==
The Phasmida Species File lists:

1. Baculomia baviensis Bresseel & Constant, 2019
2. Baculomia pumatensis Bresseel & Constant, 2019 – type species (locality Vietnam)
3. Baculomia siamensis (Brunner von Wattenwyl, 1907)
