= Medaura =

Scientific classification
- Kingdom: Animalia
- Phylum: Arthropoda
- Clade: Pancrustacea
- Class: Insecta
- Order: Phasmatodea
- Family: Phasmatidae
- Subfamily: Clitumninae
- Tribe: Medaurini
- Genus: Medaura; Stål, 1875

Synonyms
- Menaka Wood-Mason, 1877

Genus of stick insects

Medaura is an Asian genus of stick insects in the family Phasmatidae, subfamily Clitumninae and tribe Medaurini. Species have a known distribution from tropical Asia, including Indo-China.

== Species ==
Medaura includes the following species:

- Medaura austeni (Wood-Mason, 1875)
- Medaura jobrensis Brock & Cliquennois, 2001
- Medaura lagerstroemia Thanasinchayakul, 2006
- Medaura makassarinus (Westwood, 1859)
- Medaura scabriuscula (Wood-Mason, 1873) - type species (as Stheneboea brunneri Stål)
