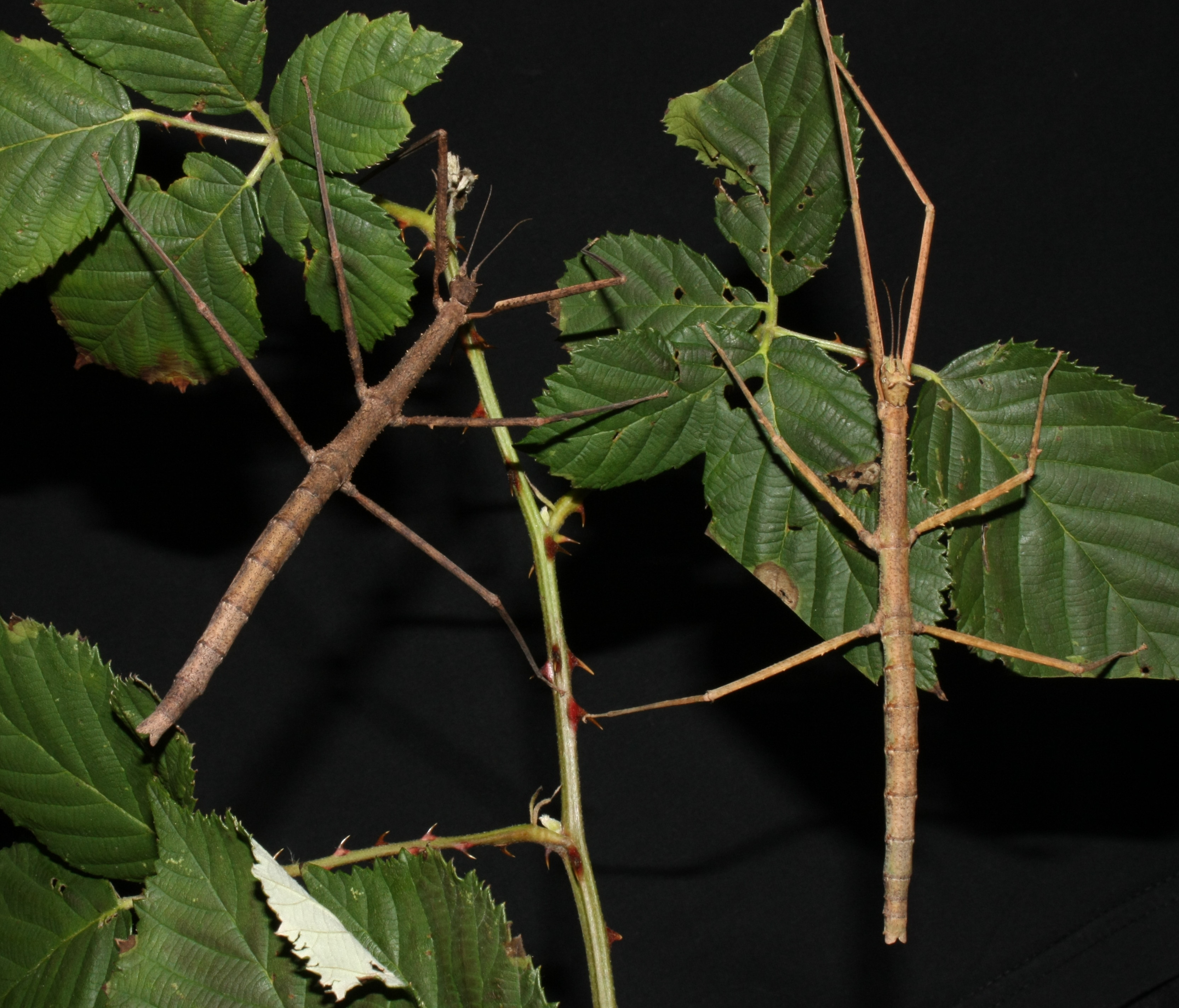
- Medauroidea extradentata females

Scientific classification
- Domain: Eukaryota
- Kingdom: Animalia
- Phylum: Arthropoda
- Class: Insecta
- Order: Phasmatodea
- Infraorder: Anareolatae
- Family: Phasmatidae
- Subfamily: Clitumninae
- Tribe: Medaurini
- Genus: Medauroidea; Zompro, 2000

= Medauroidea =

Genus of stick insects

Medauroidea is an Asian genus of stick insects in the family Phasmatidae and subfamily Clitumninae (tribe Medaurini). Species have been recorded from Indo-China.

== Species ==
The Catalogue of Life and Phasmida Species File list:

- Medauroidea brongniarti (Brunner von Wattenwyl, 1907)
- Medauroidea cattienensis Ho, 2020
- Medauroidea chenshuchuni Ho, 2017
- Medauroidea cornuta Ho, 2020
- Medauroidea dolichocercata (Bi & Wang, 1998)
- Medauroidea extradentata (Brunner von Wattenwyl, 1907) - type species (as Clitumnus extradentatus) - Vietnam
- Medauroidea fasciata Ho, 2020
- Medauroidea nyalamensis (Chen, Shang & Pei, 2000)
- Medauroidea polita (Chen & He, 1997)
- Medauroidea regula (Brunner von Wattenwyl, 1907)
- Medauroidea romantica Bresseel & Constant, 2018
