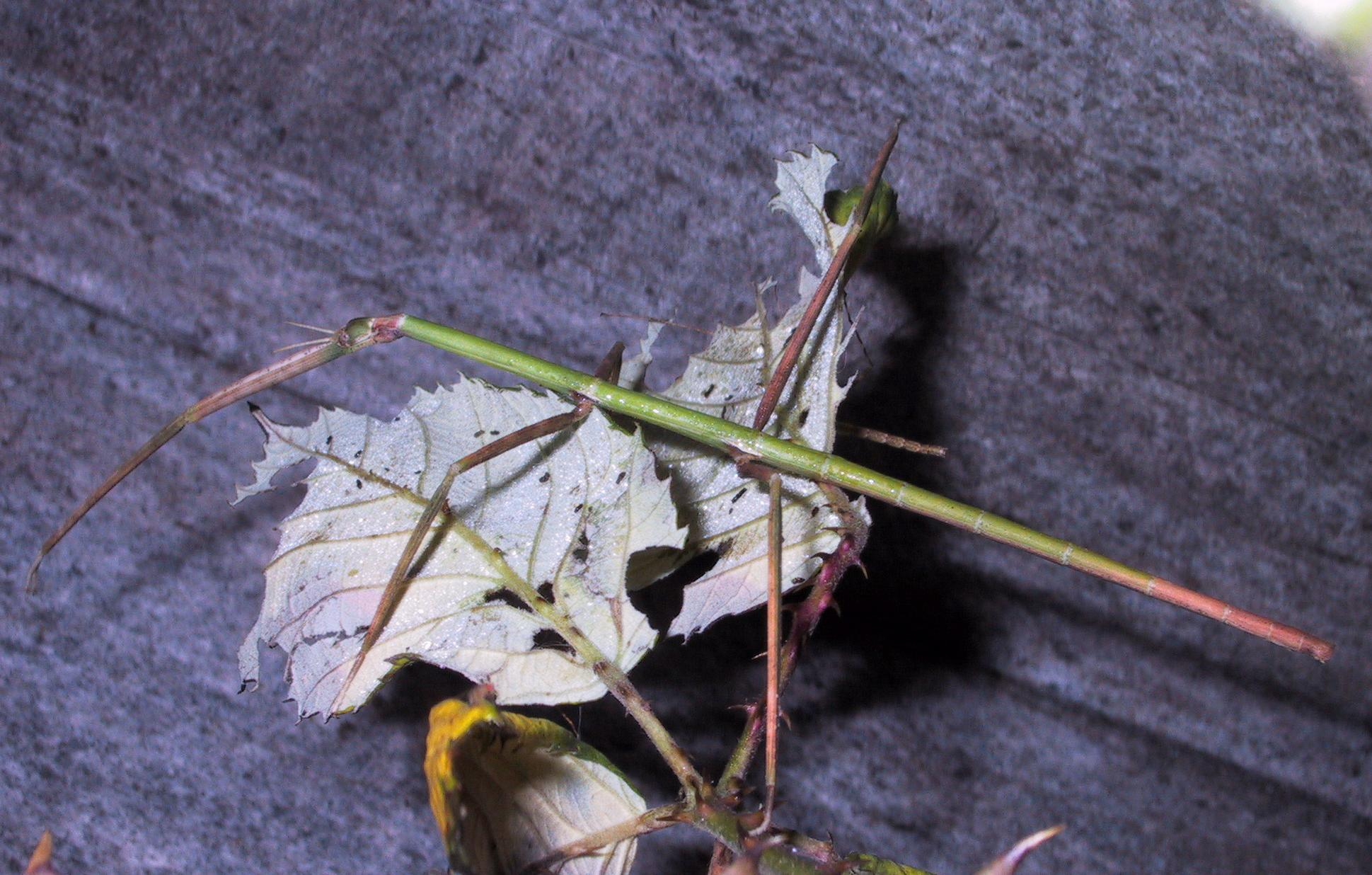
- Cuniculina (Bangladesh)

Scientific classification
- Domain: Eukaryota
- Kingdom: Animalia
- Phylum: Arthropoda
- Class: Insecta
- Order: Phasmatodea
- Family: Phasmatidae
- Subfamily: Clitumninae
- Tribe: Clitumnini
- Genus: Cuniculina; Brunner von Wattenwyl, 1907

= Cuniculina =

Genus of insects

Cuniculina is a genus of phasmids belonging to the family Phasmatidae.

The species of this genus are found in Madagascar.

Species:

- Cuniculina cunicula (Westwood, 1859)
- Cuniculina insignis (Wood-Mason, 1873)
- Cuniculina obnoxia Brunner von Wattenwyl, 1907
- Cuniculina stilpna (Westwood, 1859)
