= Xenophasmina =

Scientific classification
- Domain: Eukaryota
- Kingdom: Animalia
- Phylum: Arthropoda
- Class: Insecta
- Order: Phasmatodea
- Infraorder: Anareolatae
- Family: Phasmatidae
- Subfamily: Xeroderinae
- Genus: Xenophasmina; Uvarov, 1940

Synonyms
- Xenophasma Redtenbacher, 1908

Genus of stick insects

Xenophasmina is an Asian genus of stick insects in the family Phasmatidae and subfamily Xeroderinae. Species have a known distribution from Indo-China.

== Species ==
Xenophasmina includes the following species:

- Xenophasmina fimbriatum (Redtenbacher, 1908) - type species
- Xenophasmina simile (Redtenbacher, 1908)
