= Medauromorpha =

Scientific classification
- Domain: Eukaryota
- Kingdom: Animalia
- Phylum: Arthropoda
- Class: Insecta
- Order: Phasmatodea
- Infraorder: Anareolatae
- Family: Phasmatidae
- Subfamily: Clitumninae
- Genus: Medauromorpha; Bresseel & Constant, 2017

Genus of stick insects

Medauromorpha is an Asian genus of stick insects in the family Phasmatidae, subfamily Clitumninae and tribe Medaurini. Species have a known distribution from Vietnam and southern China.

== Species ==
Medauromorpha includes the following species:

- Medauromorpha baviensis Bresseel & Constant, 2017
- Medauromorpha foedata (Brunner von Wattenwyl, 1907)
- Medauromorpha regina (Brunner von Wattenwyl, 1907) - type species (as Cuniculina regina Brunner von Wattenwyl)
