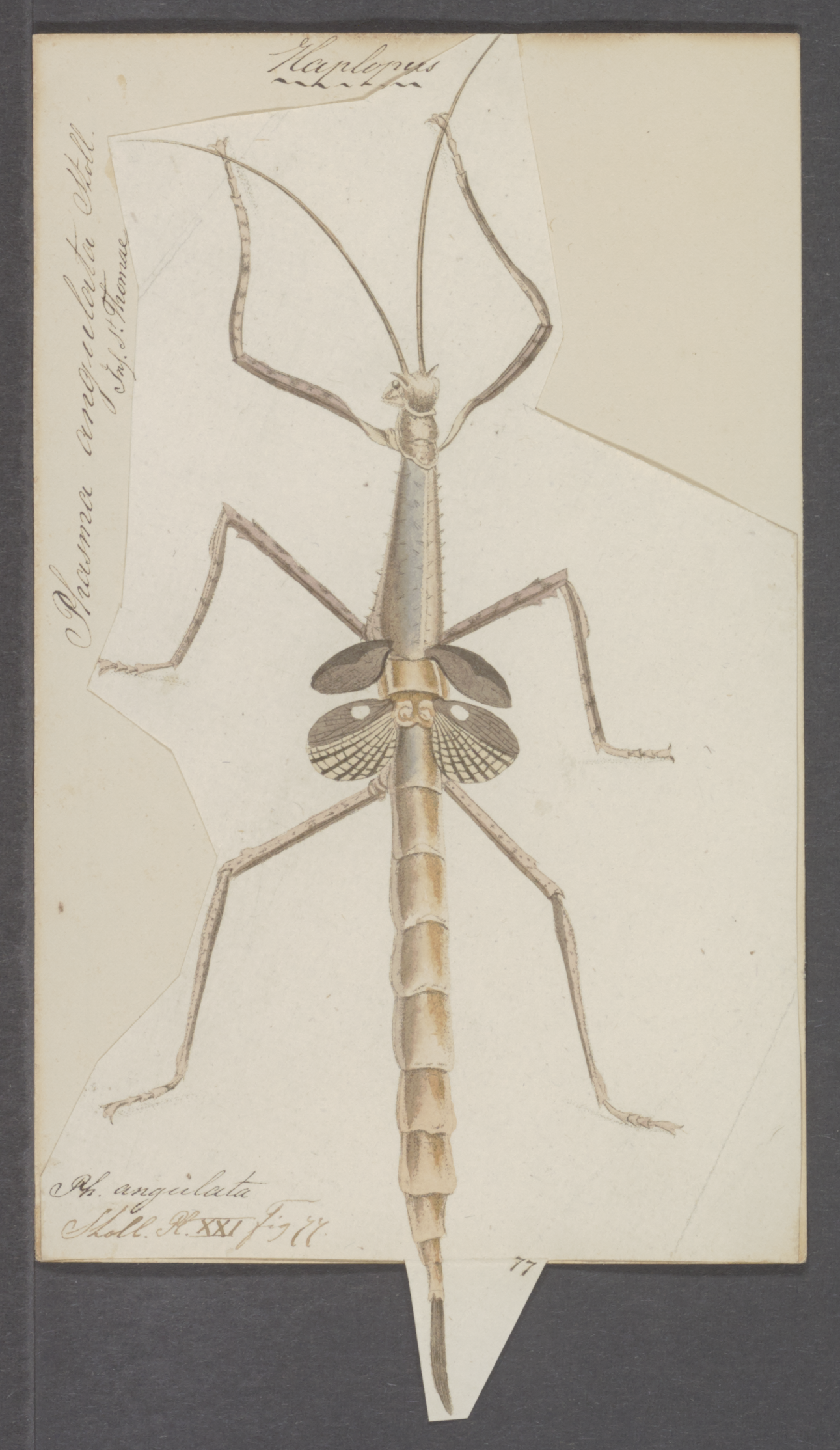
- Illustration of Haplopus

Scientific classification
- Kingdom: Animalia
- Phylum: Arthropoda
- Class: Insecta
- Order: Phasmatodea
- Family: Phasmatidae
- Subfamily: Cladomorphinae
- Tribe: Haplopodini
- Genus: Haplopus; Burmeister, 1838

= Haplopus =

Genus of insects

Haplopus is a genus of walkingsticks in the family Phasmatidae. There are about seven described species in Haplopus.

== Species ==
These seven species belong to the genus Haplopus:

- Haplopus bicuspidatus (Haan, 1842)
- Haplopus brachypterus Hennemann, Conle & Perez-Gelabert, 2016
- Haplopus intermedius Hennemann, Conle & Perez-Gelabert, 2016
- Haplopus micropterus (Peletier de Saint Fargeau & Serville, 1828)
- Haplopus scabricollis (Gray, 1835)
- Haplopus sobrinus Hennemann, Conle & Perez-Gelabert, 2016
- Haplopus woodruffi Hennemann, Conle & Perez-Gelabert, 2016
