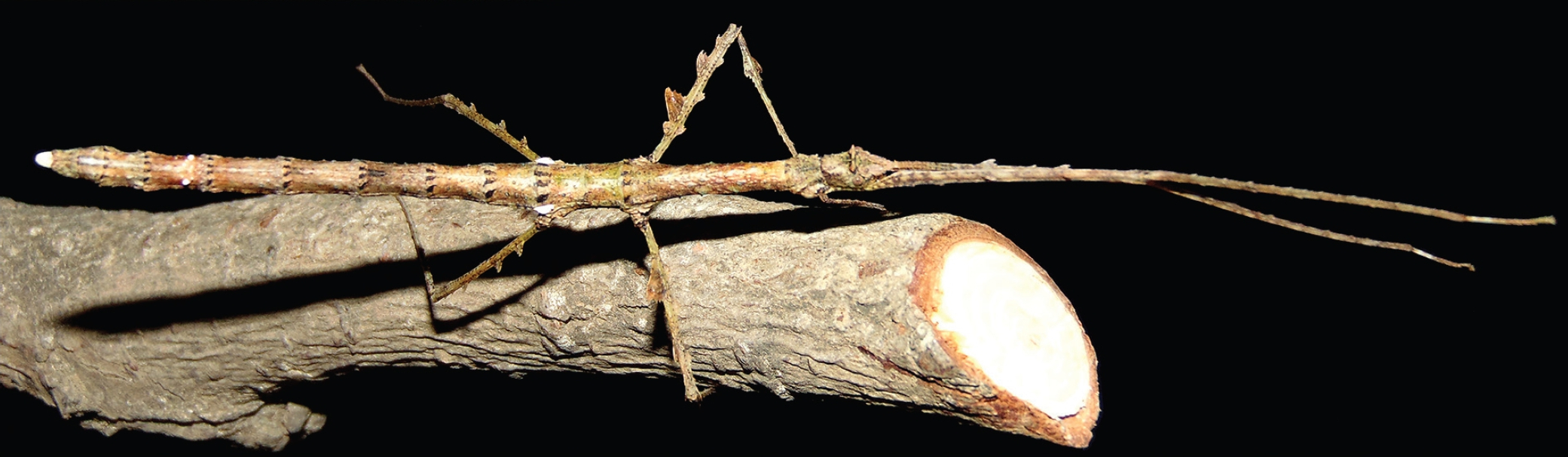
- Lobofemora bidoupensis female

Scientific classification
- Kingdom: Animalia
- Phylum: Arthropoda
- Class: Insecta
- Order: Phasmatodea
- Family: Phasmatidae
- Subfamily: Clitumninae
- Tribe: Clitumnini
- Genus: Lobofemora; Bresseel & Constant, 2015

= Lobofemora =

Genus of stick insects

Lobofemora is a genus of stick insects in the subfamily Clitumninae. Species have known distributions from National Parks in Vietnam.

The type species is L. scheirei, the males of which are able to stridulate by rubbing the outer margins of the tegmina against the subcostal and radial veins of the alae.

== Species ==
The Phasmida Species File lists:

- Lobofemora bachmaensis Bresseel & Constant, 2015 - Bạch Mã National Park
- Lobofemora bidoupensis Bresseel & Constant, 2015 - Bidoup Núi Bà National Park
- Lobofemora scheirei Bresseel & Constant, 2015 - Cát Tiên National Park
