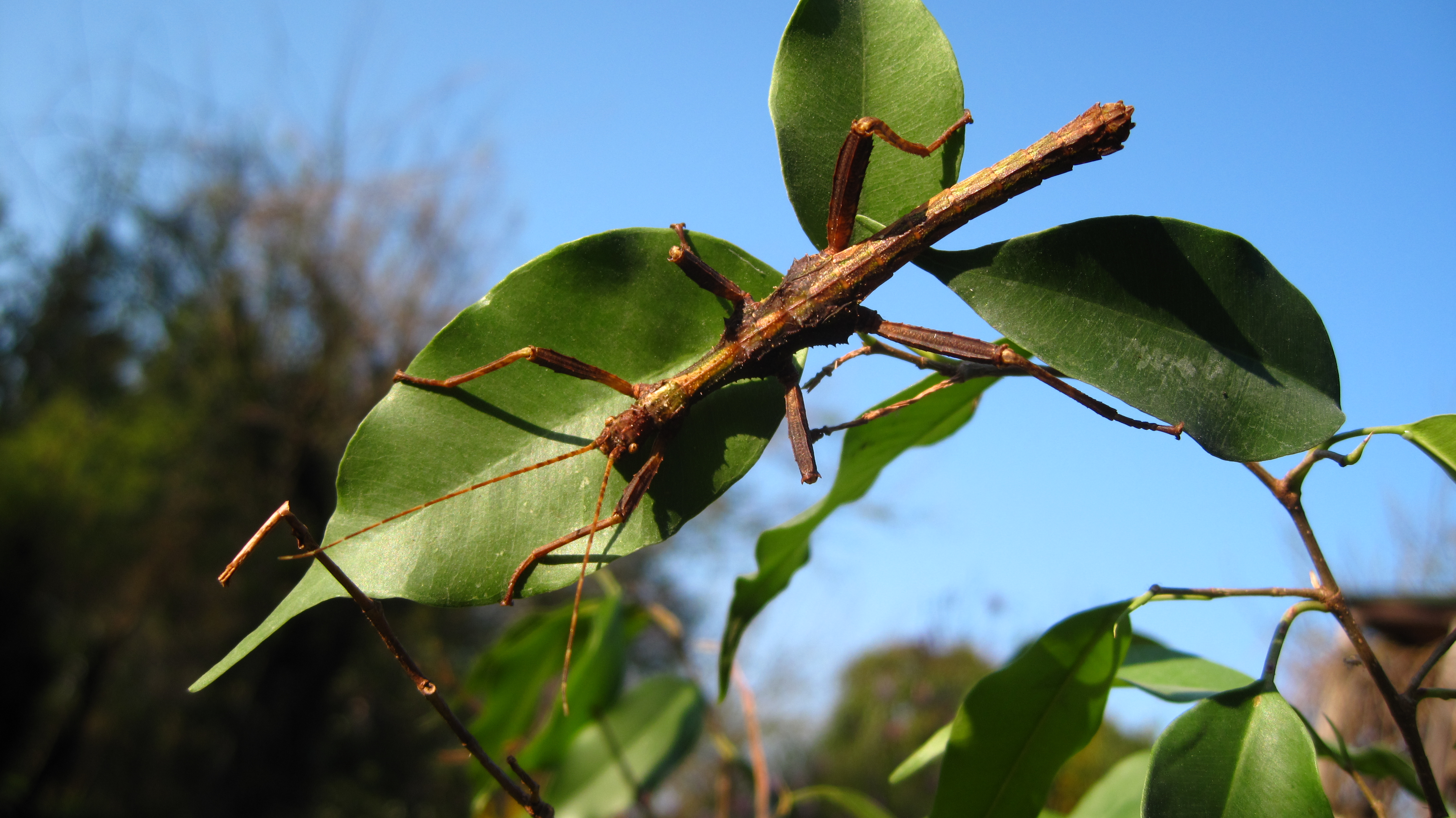
- Diapherodes gigantea

Scientific classification
- Kingdom: Animalia
- Phylum: Arthropoda
- Class: Insecta
- Order: Phasmatodea
- Family: Phasmatidae
- Subfamily: Cladomorphinae; Brunner von Wattenwyl, 1893

Synonyms
- Cladomorphidae Brunner von Wattenwyl, 1893; Phibalosomini Redtenbacher, 1908; Philobasominae

= Cladomorphinae =

Subfamily of stick insects

The Cladomorphinae are a subfamily of stick insects in the family Phasmatidae. This taxon is particularly well represented in the Neotropical region, but records (under review) also exist for Madagascar, Java and the Maluku Islands.

== Tribes and Genera ==
The Phasmida Species File currently (2021) lists seven tribes:

=== Cladomorphini ===
Auth. Brunner von Wattenwyl, 1893

1. Aplopocranidium Zompro, 2004
2. Cladomorphus Gray, 1835
3. Hirtuleius Stål, 1875
4. Jeremia Redtenbacher, 1908
5. Jeremiodes Hennemann & Conle, 2007
6. Otocraniella Zompro, 2004
7. Xylodus Saussure, 1859

=== Cladoxerini ===
Auth. Karny, 1923

1. Cladoxerus Peletier de Saint Fargeau & Audinet-Serville, 1828
2. Parabactridium Redtenbacher, 1908
3. Wattenwylia Piza, 1938

=== Cranidiini ===
Auth. Günther, 1953

- monotypic genus Cranidium Westwood, 1843

=== Haplopodini ===
Auth. Günther, 1953

1. Aploploides Rehn & Hebard, 1938
2. Apteroplopus Hennemann, Conle & Perez-Gelabert, 2016
3. Cephaloplopus Hennemann, Conle & Perez-Gelabert, 2016
4. Diapherodes Gray, 1835
5. Haplopus Burmeister, 1838
6. Paracranidium Brock, 1998
7. Parhaplopus Hennemann, Conle & Perez-Gelabert, 2016
8. Venupherodes Hennemann, Conle & Perez-Gelabert, 2016

=== Hesperophasmatini ===
Auth. Bradley & Galil, 1977

1. Agamemnon Moxey, 1971
2. Hesperophasma Rehn, 1901
3. Hypocyrtus Redtenbacher, 1908
4. Lamponius Stål, 1875
5. Rhynchacris Redtenbacher, 1908
6. Sigaruphasma Hennemann, Conle, Perez-Gelabert & Valero, 2020
7. Tainophasma Conle, Hennemann & Perez-Gelabert, 2014
8. Taraxippus Moxey, 1971

=== Pterinoxylini ===
Auth. Hennemann, Conle & Perez-Gelabert, 2016

- monotypic genus Pterinoxylus Audinet-Serville, 1838

=== Teruelphasmini ===
Auth. Yong, 2017

1. Guamuhaya Yong, 2017
2. Teruelphasma Yong, 2017
