= Metentoria =

Scientific classification
- Domain: Eukaryota
- Kingdom: Animalia
- Phylum: Arthropoda
- Class: Insecta
- Order: Phasmatodea
- Family: Phasmatidae
- Subfamily: Clitumninae
- Tribe: Clitumnini
- Genus: Metentoria; Brunner von Wattenwyl, 1907

Genus of stick insects

Metentoria is a genus of stick insects in the tribe Clitumnini, erected by Carl Brunner von Wattenwyl in 1907. Species have been recorded from: India and Vietnam (possibly an incomplete distribution).

== Species ==
The Phasmida Species File lists:

1. Metentoria regina Brunner von Wattenwyl, 1907 - type species
2. Metentoria regulus (Westwood, 1859)
