= Cnipsomorpha =

Scientific classification
- Domain: Eukaryota
- Kingdom: Animalia
- Phylum: Arthropoda
- Class: Insecta
- Order: Phasmatodea
- Family: Phasmatidae
- Subfamily: Clitumninae
- Tribe: Medaurini
- Genus: Cnipsomorpha; Hennemann, Conle, Zhang & Liu, 2008

Genus of stick insects

External image
- Images at iNaturalist

Cnipsomorpha is a genus of Asian stick insects in the tribe Medaurini, erected by Hennemann, Conle, Zhang and Liu in 2008. Species have been recorded from: southern China (Guangxi and Yunnan) and Vietnam (yet to be described).

== Species ==
The Phasmida Species File lists:

1. Cnipsomorpha apteris (Liu & Cai, 1992)
2. Cnipsomorpha bii Ho, 2017
3. Cnipsomorpha colorantis (Chen & He, 1996)
4. Cnipsomorpha daliensis Ho, 2017
5. Cnipsomorpha erinacea Hennemann, Conle, Zhang & Liu, 2008 - type species
6. Cnipsomorpha inflexa Ho, 2021
7. Cnipsomorpha jinpingensis Ho, 2021
8. Cnipsomorpha kunmingensis Chen & Pan, 2009
9. Cnipsomorpha maoershanensis Ho, 2017
10. Cnipsomorpha nigromaculata Ho, 2021
11. Cnipsomorpha nigrospina Ho, 2021
12. Cnipsomorpha polyspina Ho, 2021
13. Cnipsomorpha serratitibia Ho, 2021
14. Cnipsomorpha trituberculata Ho, 2021
15. Cnipsomorpha viridis Ho, 2021
