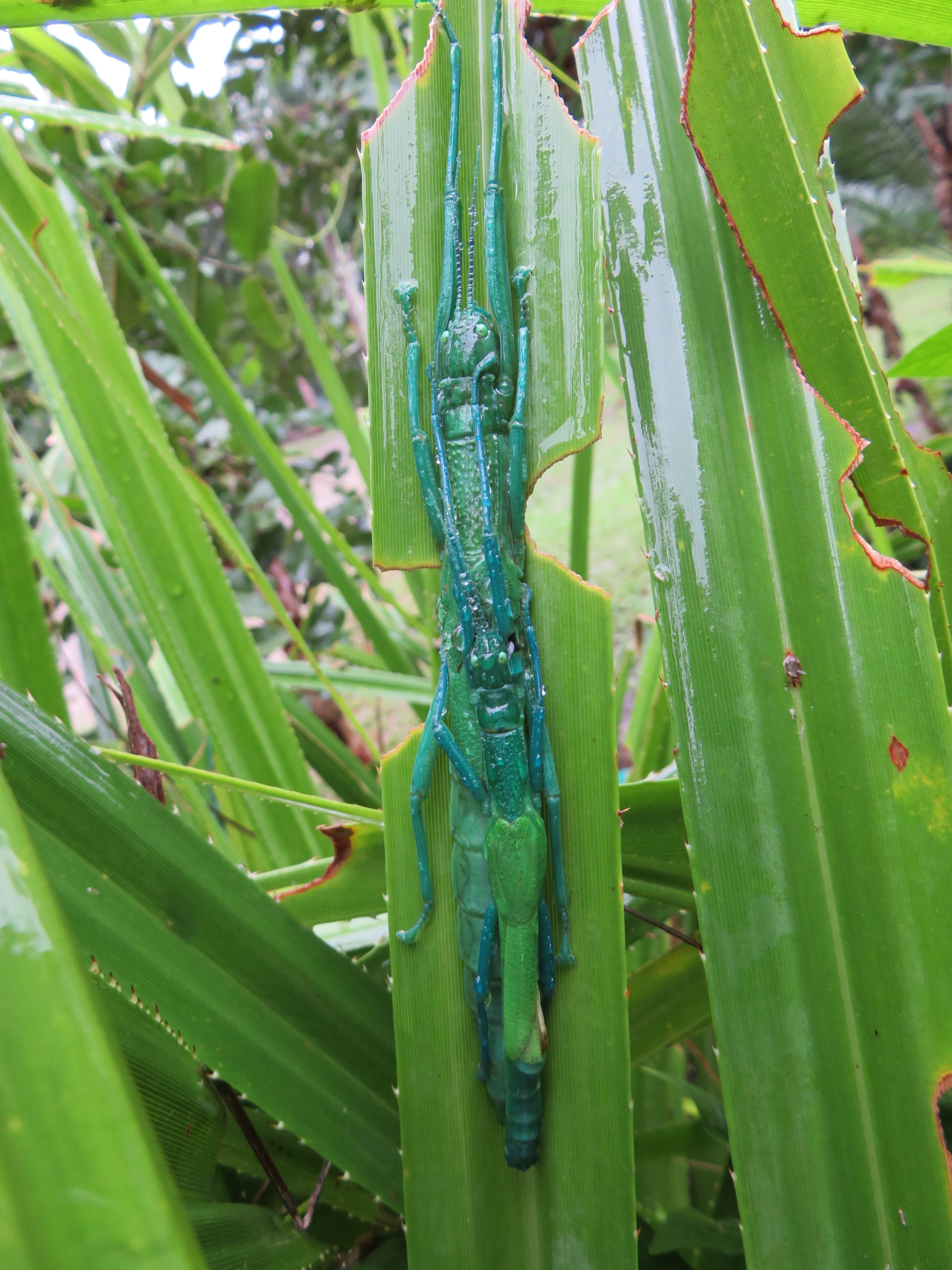
- Adults mating at Cape Tribulation, Queensland, Australia

Scientific classification
- Domain: Eukaryota
- Kingdom: Animalia
- Phylum: Arthropoda
- Class: Insecta
- Order: Phasmatodea
- Family: Phasmatidae
- Subfamily: Megacraniinae
- Genus: Megacrania; Kaup, 1871

= Megacrania =

Genus of stick insects

Megacrania is a genus of the subfamily Megacraniinae of stick insects. Members of this genus are commonly referred to as "peppermint stick insects", due to the characteristic odor of their defensive spray, as well as the cylindrical, twig-like shape of their bodies.

These unusual insects are notable for their aposematic coloration, as well as their robust chemical defense mechanism. This mechanism consists of an irritating fluid — with an odor resembling peppermint — that they spray from a pair of scent glands located at the prothorax when threatened. This fluid is irritating or painful when inhaled or absorbed through mucous membranes, and is an effective deterrent against many arthropod, reptilian and avian predators.

== Taxonomy ==
This genus was first described by Johann Jakob Kaup in 1871. After an exhaustive study, the genus Megacrania was revised in 2007. Among other revisions, M. batesii was removed from synonymy with M. alpheus. There are now 12 known species within the genus:

- M. alpheus
- M. artus
- M. batesii
- M. brocki
- M. nigrosulfurea
- M. obscurus
- M. phelaus (Westwood, 1859) - type species (as Platycrania phelaus Westwood)
- M. rentzi
- M. spina
- M. tsudai
- M. vickeri
- M. wegneri

The genus Megacrania was further revised in 2020, when it was transferred from subfamily Platycraninae to subfamily Megacraniinae (palm stick insects). The two tribes (Platycranini and Stephanacridini) within the former subfamily, Platycraninae, have been determined to be not closely related to the Megacraniinae.
