= Woodmasonia =

Scientific classification
- Domain: Eukaryota
- Kingdom: Animalia
- Phylum: Arthropoda
- Class: Insecta
- Order: Phasmatodea
- Family: Phasmatidae
- Subfamily: Clitumninae
- Tribe: Clitumnini
- Genus: Woodmasonia; Brunner von Wattenwyl, 1907
- Species: W. oxytenes

Binomial name
- Woodmasonia oxytenes (Wood-Mason, 1873)

Genus of insects

Woodmasonia is a monotypic genus of phasmids belonging to the family Phasmatidae. The only species is Woodmasonia oxytenes, recorded from Myanmar.
