= Rhamphophasma =

Scientific classification
- Kingdom: Animalia
- Phylum: Arthropoda
- Class: Insecta
- Order: Phasmatodea
- Family: Phasmatidae
- Subfamily: Clitumninae
- Tribe: Clitumnini
- Genus: Rhamphophasma; Brunner von Wattenwyl, 1893

Genus of stick insects

Rhamphophasma is a genus of stick insects in the tribe Clitumnini, erected by Carl Brunner von Wattenwyl in 1893. Species have been recorded from: China, Vietnam, India, Myanmar and Japan (possibly incomplete).

== Species ==
The Phasmida Species File lists:

1. Rhamphophasma dianicum Chen & He, 1994
2. Rhamphophasma japanicum Brunner von Wattenwyl, 1907
3. Rhamphophasma mallati Brunner von Wattenwyl, 1907
4. Rhamphophasma modestum Brunner von Wattenwyl, 1893 - type species
5. Rhamphophasma obtusum Ho, 2017
6. Rhamphophasma pseudomodestum Ho, 2017
7. Rhamphophasma serratum Ho, 2017
8. Rhamphophasma spinicorne (Stål, 1875)
9. Rhamphophasma vile Brunner von Wattenwyl, 1907
