= Prosentoria =

Scientific classification
- Domain: Eukaryota
- Kingdom: Animalia
- Phylum: Arthropoda
- Class: Insecta
- Order: Phasmatodea
- Family: Phasmatidae
- Subfamily: Clitumninae
- Tribe: Clitumnini
- Genus: Prosentoria; Brunner von Wattenwyl, 1907

Genus of stick insects

External image
- Images at iNaturalist

Prosentoria is a genus of stick insects in the tribe Clitumnini, erected by Carl Brunner von Wattenwyl in 1907. Species have been recorded from: Vietnam and Borneo (distribution is probably incomplete).

== Species ==
The Phasmida Species File lists:

1. Prosentoria arrogans Brunner von Wattenwyl, 1907 - type species
2. Prosentoria vietnamensis Ho, 2020
