= Interphasma =

Scientific classification
- Domain: Eukaryota
- Kingdom: Animalia
- Phylum: Arthropoda
- Class: Insecta
- Order: Phasmatodea
- Family: Phasmatidae
- Subfamily: Clitumninae
- Tribe: Medaurini
- Genus: Interphasma; Chen & He, 2008

Genus of stick insects

External image
- Unconfirmed image submitted to iNaturalist

Interphasma is a genus of Asian stick insects in the tribe Medaurini, erected by S.C. Chen and Y.H. He in 2008. To date (2022), species have been recorded mostly from China, with one in Vietnam.

== Species ==
The Phasmida Species File lists:

1. Interphasma bifidum Chen & He, 2008
2. Interphasma conicercum Chen & He, 2008
3. Interphasma elongatum Ho, 2017
4. Interphasma emeiense Chen & He, 2008
5. Interphasma fanjingense Chen & He, 2008
6. Interphasma guangxiense Chen & He, 2008
7. Interphasma huanglianshanense Ho, 2017
8. Interphasma huayingshanense Li, Shi & Wang, 2021
9. Interphasma indistinctum Ho, 2022
10. Interphasma leigongshanense Xu, Yang & Guo, 2010
11. Interphasma lineatum Ho, 2020 (Vietnam only)
12. Interphasma lizipingense Ho & Shi, 2013
13. Interphasma longnanense Chen & He, 2008
14. Interphasma lushanense Chen & He, 2008 - type species
15. Interphasma marginatum Chen & Zhang, 2008
16. Interphasma nigrolineatum Chen & He, 2008
17. Interphasma pusillum Ho, 2022
18. Interphasma robustum Ho, 2022
19. Interphasma shaanxiense Chen & He, 2008
20. Interphasma wolongense Chen & He, 2008
21. Interphasma xinjiangense Chen & He, 2008
22. Interphasma yunnanense Ho, 2022
