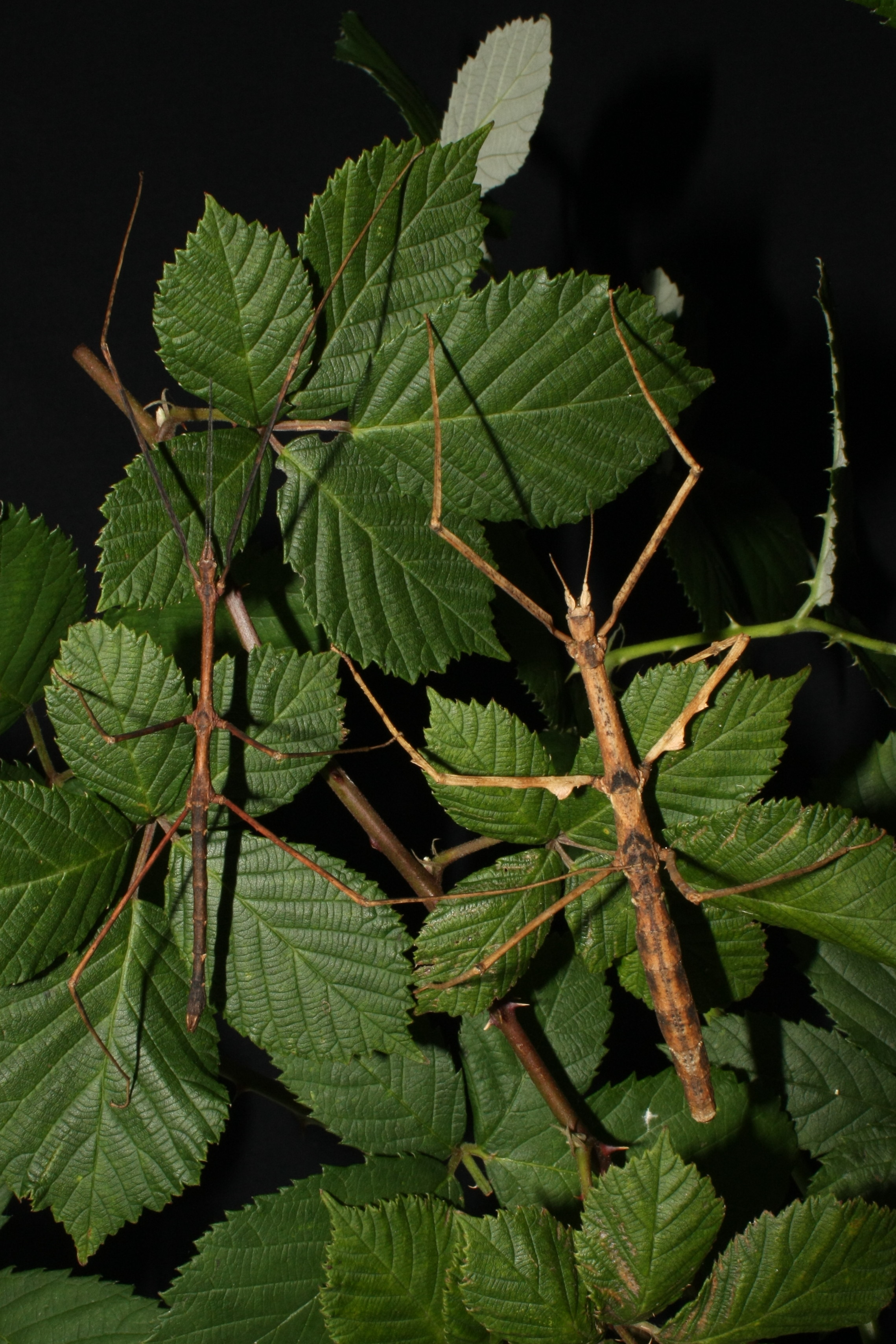
- Parapachymorpha zomproi: male and female

Scientific classification
- Domain: Eukaryota
- Kingdom: Animalia
- Phylum: Arthropoda
- Class: Insecta
- Order: Phasmatodea
- Family: Phasmatidae
- Subfamily: Clitumninae
- Tribe: Medaurini
- Genus: Parapachymorpha; Brunner von Wattenwyl, 1893

Synonyms
- Ponapachymorpha Günther, 1929

= Parapachymorpha =

Genus of stick insects

External image
- Images at iNaturalist

Parapachymorpha is a genus of stick insects in the tribe Medaurini, erected by Carl Brunner von Wattenwyl in 1893. Species have been recorded from: China, Myanmar, Thailand, Cambodia and Vietnam.

== Species ==
The Phasmida Species File lists:

1. Parapachymorpha apicalis Ho, 2020
2. Parapachymorpha dentata Ho, 2017
3. Parapachymorpha granulata Ho, 2021
4. Parapachymorpha nigra Brunner von Wattenwyl, 1893 - type species (by subsequent designation)
5. Parapachymorpha parvicorne Ho, 2021
6. Parapachymorpha spinigera (Brunner von Wattenwyl, 1907)
7. Parapachymorpha tridentata Ho, 2020
8. Parapachymorpha zomproi Fritzsche & Gitsaga, 2000

Note: Parapachymorpha commelina Thanasinchayakul, 2006 may be a nomen nudum.
