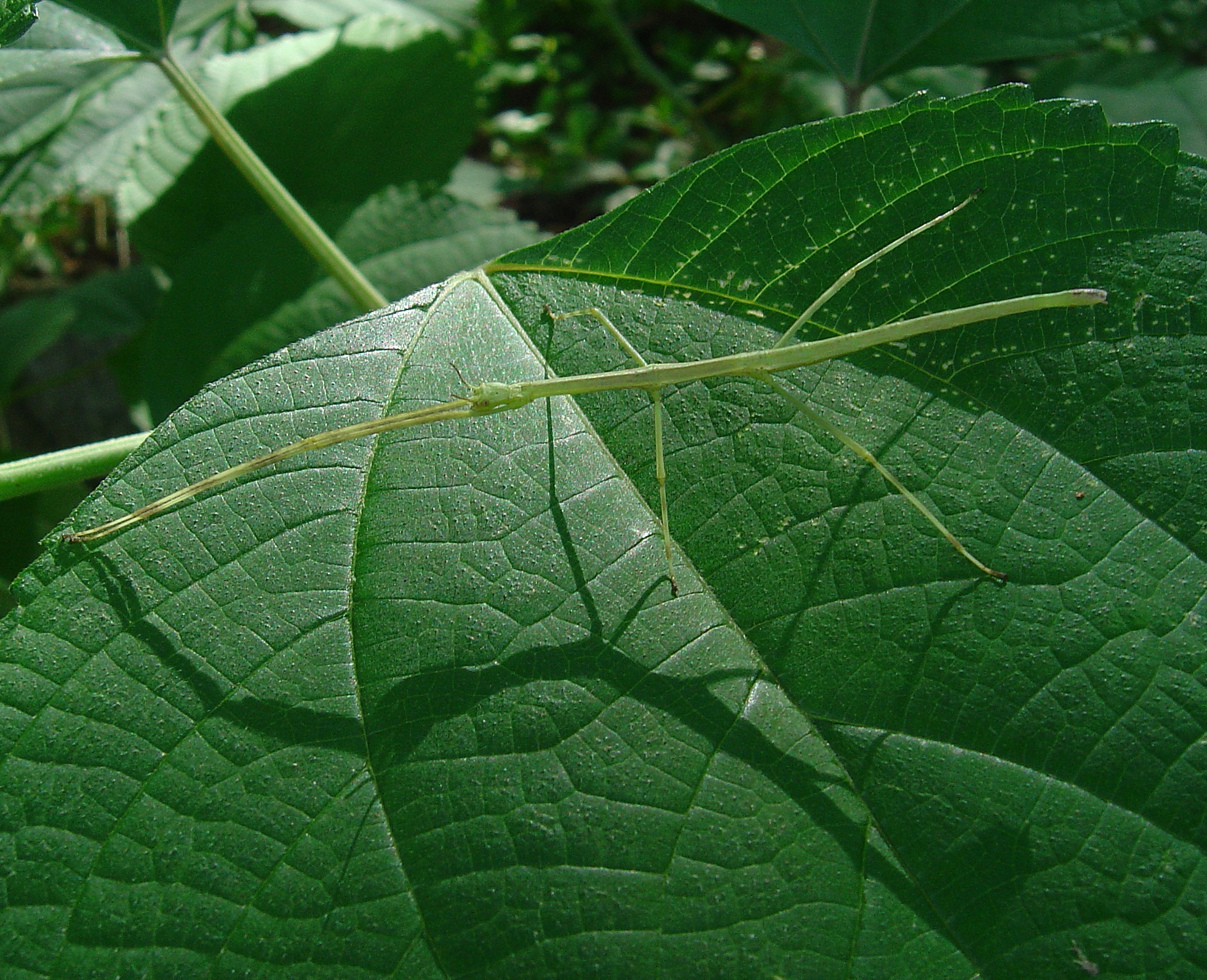
- Ramulus irregulariterdentatus

Scientific classification
- Domain: Eukaryota
- Kingdom: Animalia
- Phylum: Arthropoda
- Class: Insecta
- Order: Phasmatodea
- Suborder: Euphasmatodea
- Infraorder: Anareolatae
- Family: Phasmatidae
- Subfamily: Clitumninae; Brunner von Wattenwyl, 1893

Synonyms
- Clitumnidae Brunner von Wattenwyl, 1893; Clitumini Brunner von Wattenwyl, 1893; Ramulini Günther, 1953

= Clitumninae =

Subfamily of stick insects

The Clitumninae are a sub-family of stick insects in the family Phasmatidae found in Asia (a record for Phobaeticus from Brasil was probably erroneous). The type genus Clitumnus is now considered a synonym of Ramulus.

== Tribes and genera ==
The Phasmida Species File lists three tribes:

=== Clitumnini ===
Authority: Brunner von Wattenwyl, 1893

1. Baculomia Bresseel & Constant, 2019
2. Cuniculina Brunner von Wattenwyl, 1907
3. Ectentoria Brunner von Wattenwyl, 1907
4. Entoria Stål, 1875
5. Erringtonia Brunner von Wattenwyl, 1907
6. Gongylopus Brunner von Wattenwyl, 1907
7. Lobofemora Bresseel & Constant, 2015
8. Mesentoria Chen & He, 2008
9. Metentoria Brunner von Wattenwyl, 1907
10. Parabaculum Brock, 1999
11. Paraentoria Chen & He, 1997
12. Paraleiophasma Chen & He, 2008
13. Prosentoria Brunner von Wattenwyl, 1907
14. Pterulina Bresseel & Constant, 2020
15. Ramulus Saussure, 1862
16. Rhamphophasma Brunner von Wattenwyl, 1893
17. Woodmasonia Brunner von Wattenwyl, 1907

=== Medaurini ===
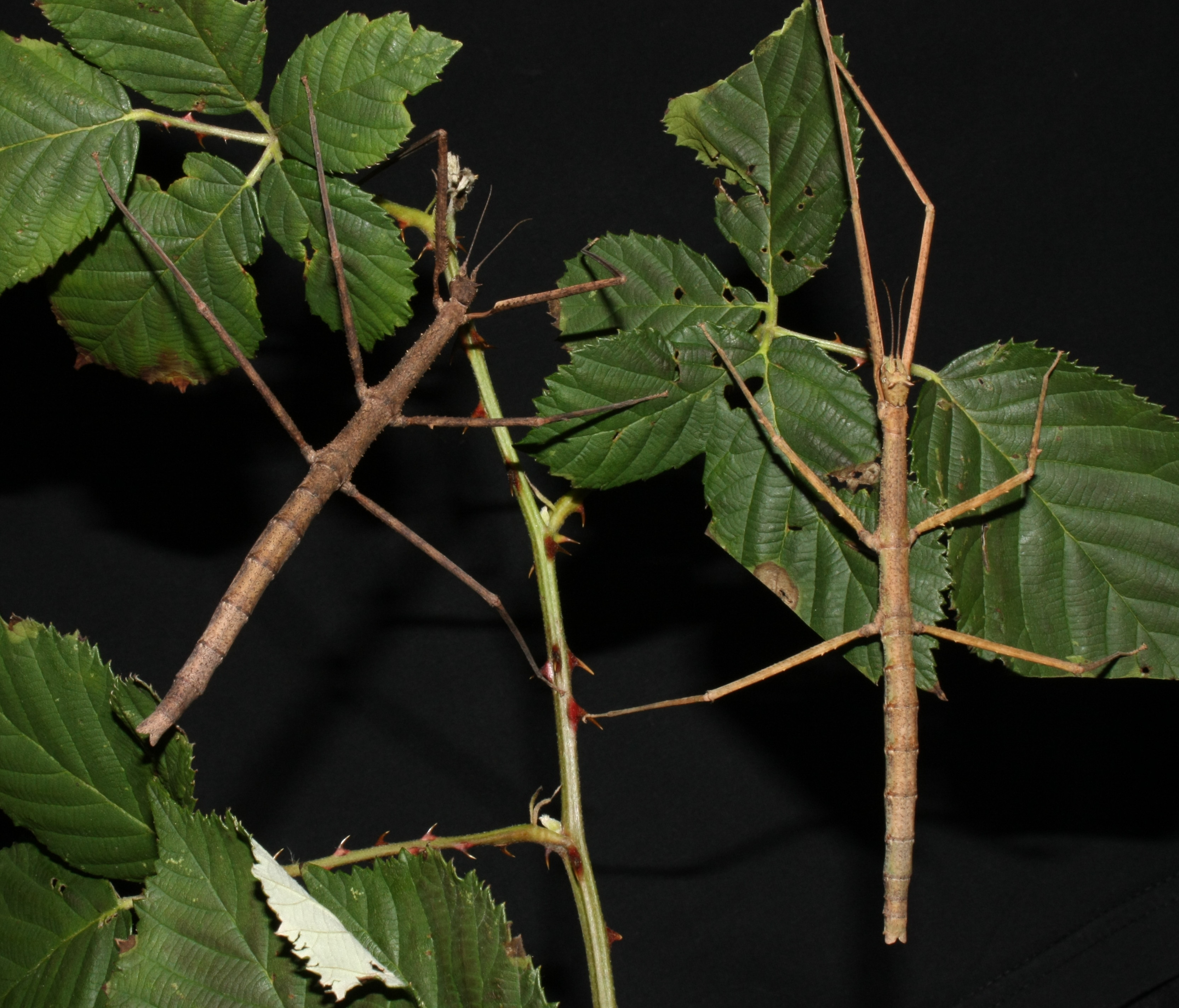
Medauroidea extradentata females

Authority: Hennemann & Conle, 2008

1. Cnipsomorpha Hennemann, Conle, Zhang & Liu, 2008
2. Interphasma Chen & He, 2008
3. Medaura Stål, 1875
4. Medauroidea Zompro, 2000
5. Medauromorpha Bresseel & Constant, 2017
6. Megacnipsomorpha Ho, 2021
7. Neomedaura Ho, 2020
8. Neosinophasma Ho, 2017
9. Neospiniphasma Ho, 2021
10. Parapachymorpha Brunner von Wattenwyl, 1893
11. Spinoparapachymorpha Ho, 2021

=== Pharnaciini ===
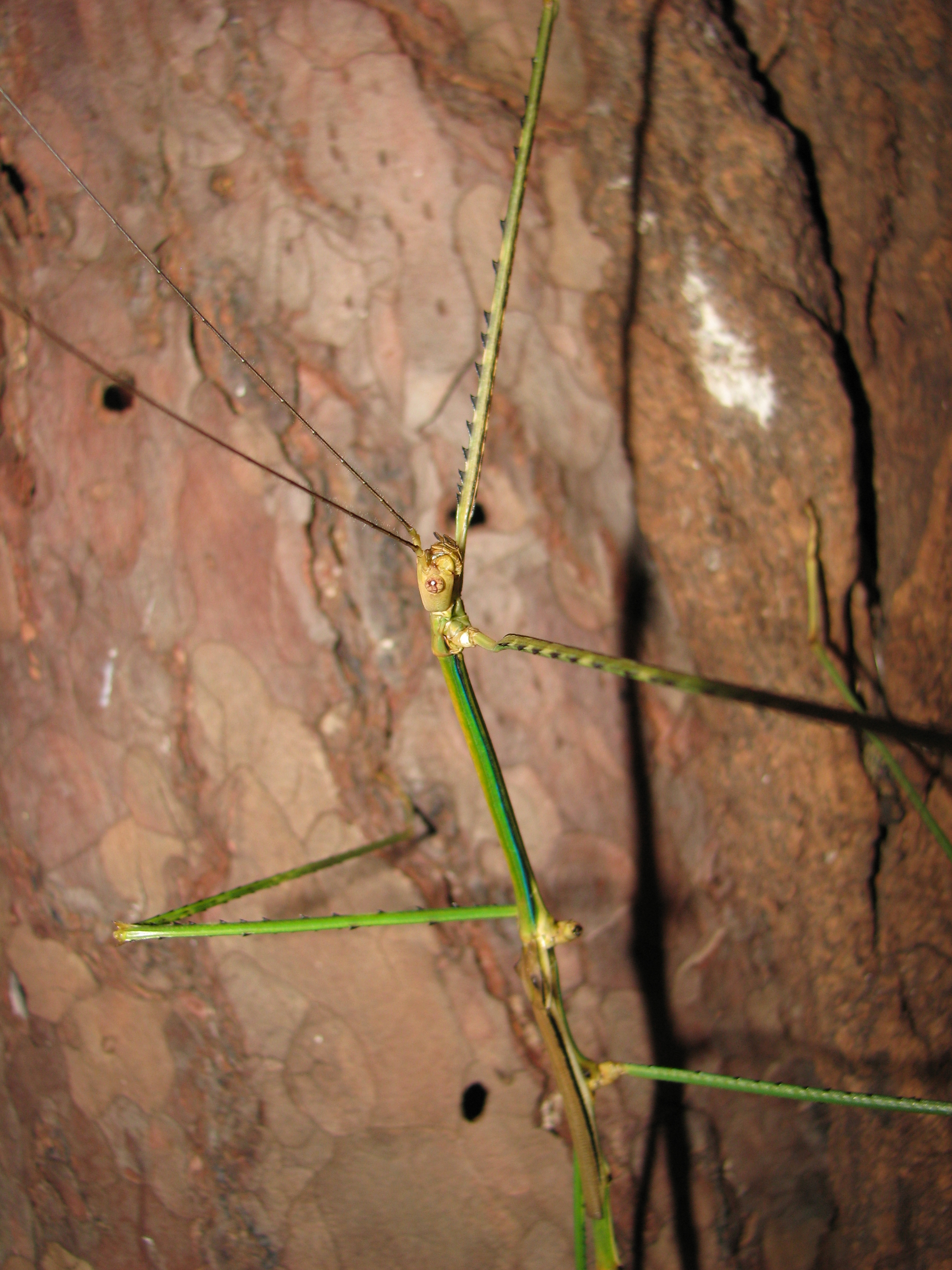
Phobaeticus serratipes

Authority: Günther, 1953; type genus:

- Pharnacia Stål, 1877
