= Leprocaulinus =

Scientific classification
- Domain: Eukaryota
- Kingdom: Animalia
- Phylum: Arthropoda
- Class: Insecta
- Order: Phasmatodea
- Family: Lonchodidae
- Genus: Leprocaulinus; Uvarov, 1940

Type species
- Leprocaulinus insularis (Kirby, 1896)

Genus of insects

Leprocaulinus is a genus of phasmids belonging to the family Lonchodidae.

The Phasmida Species File lists:

- Leprocaulinus digitatus Hennemann, 2021
- Leprocaulinus heinrichi (Günther, 1935)
- Leprocaulinus insularis (Kirby, 1896)
- Leprocaulinus kaupii (Stål, 1875)
- Leprocaulinus lobulatus (Giglio-Tos, 1910)
- Leprocaulinus mammatus (Rehn, 1904)
- Leprocaulinus obiensis (Rehn, 1904)
- Leprocaulinus sulawesiense Hennemann, 2021
- Leprocaulinus vipera (Kaup, 1871)
