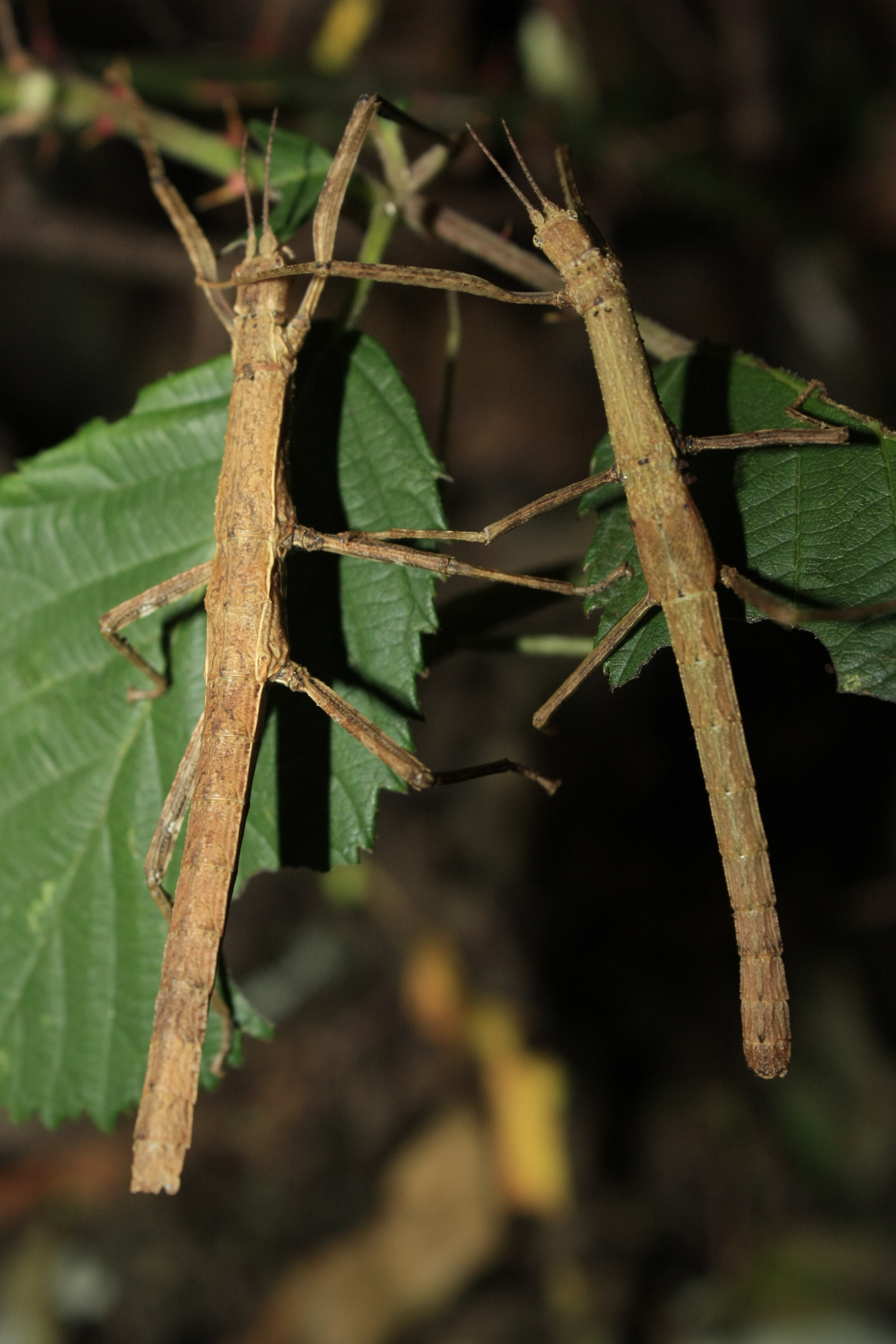
- Dimorphodes sp.

Scientific classification
- Domain: Eukaryota
- Kingdom: Animalia
- Phylum: Arthropoda
- Class: Insecta
- Order: Phasmatodea
- Suborder: Euphasmatodea
- Infraorder: Anareolatae
- Family: Phasmatidae
- Subfamily: Xeroderinae; Günther, 1953

= Xeroderinae =

Subfamily of stick insects

The Xeroderinae are a sub-family of stick insects in the family Phasmatidae: genera are found in tropical Asia and Australasia; there is a single tribe: the Xeroderini Günther, 1953.

== Genera ==
1. Caledoniophasma Günther, 1953
2. Cnipsus Zompro, 2001
3. Dimorphodes Wood-Mason, 1878
4. Epicharmus Westwood, 1859
5. Leosthenes Stål, 1875
6. Nisyrus Stål, 1875 (synonym Cotylosoma Wood-Mason, 1878)
7. Sinoxenophasmina Ho, 2021
8. Xenophasmina Uvarov, 1940
9. Xeroderus Gray, 1835
