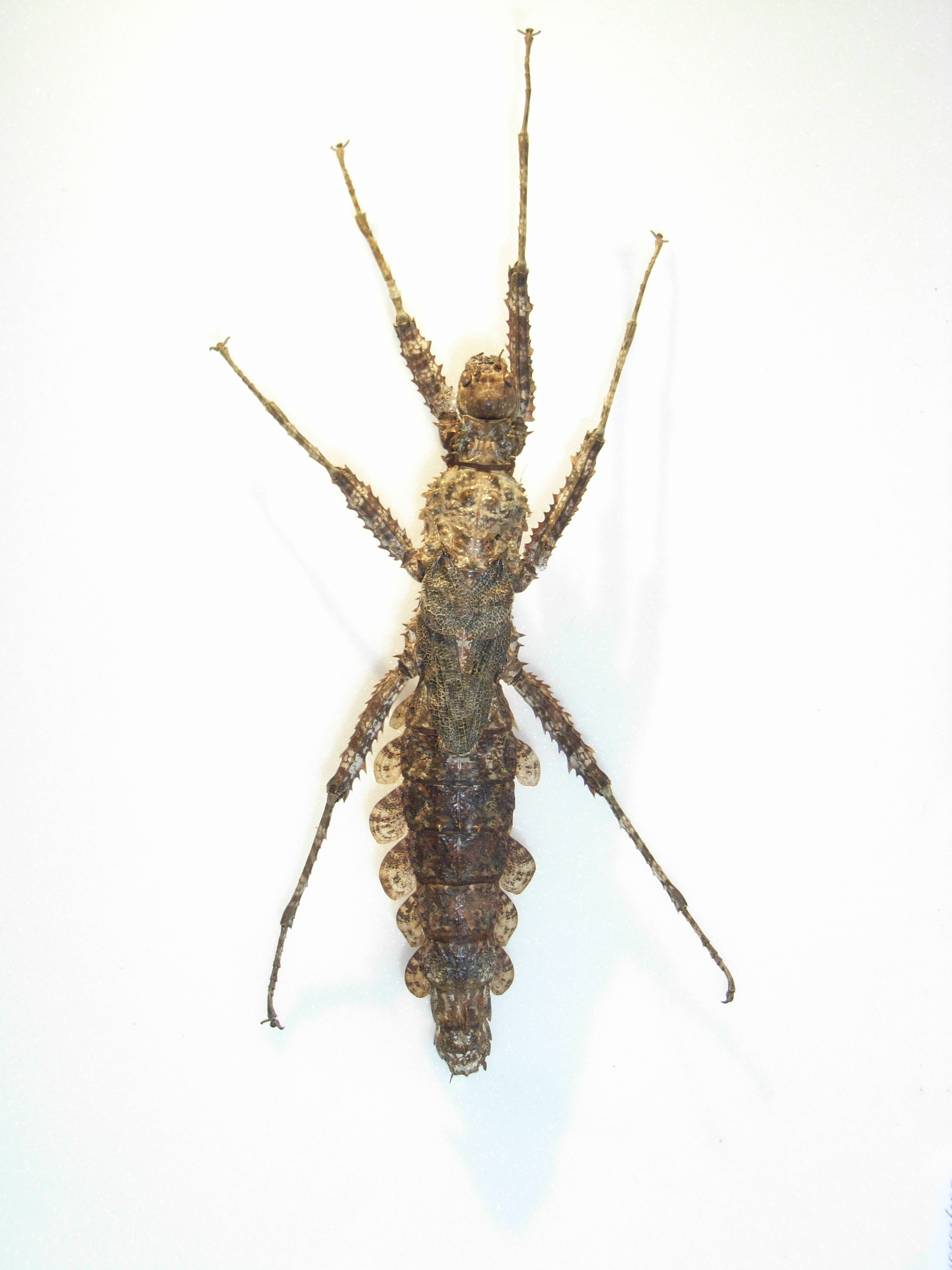

Scientific classification
- Kingdom: Animalia
- Phylum: Arthropoda
- Clade: Pancrustacea
- Class: Insecta
- Order: Phasmatodea
- Family: Phasmatidae
- Subfamily: Xeroderinae
- Genus: Nisyrus; Stål, 1877

Synonyms
- Cotylosoma Wood-Mason, 1878

= Nisyrus (insect) =

Genus of insects

Nisyrus is a genus of stick insects belonging to the tribe Xeroderini and found in the Pacific Islands.

== Species ==
The Phasmida Species File lists:

1. Nisyrus amphibius Stål, 1877
2. Nisyrus carlottae (Macgillivray, 1860)
3. Nisyrus dipneusticus (Wood-Mason, 1878)
4. Nisyrus godeffroyi Redtenbacher, 1908
5. Nisyrus spinulosus Stål, 1877 - type species
