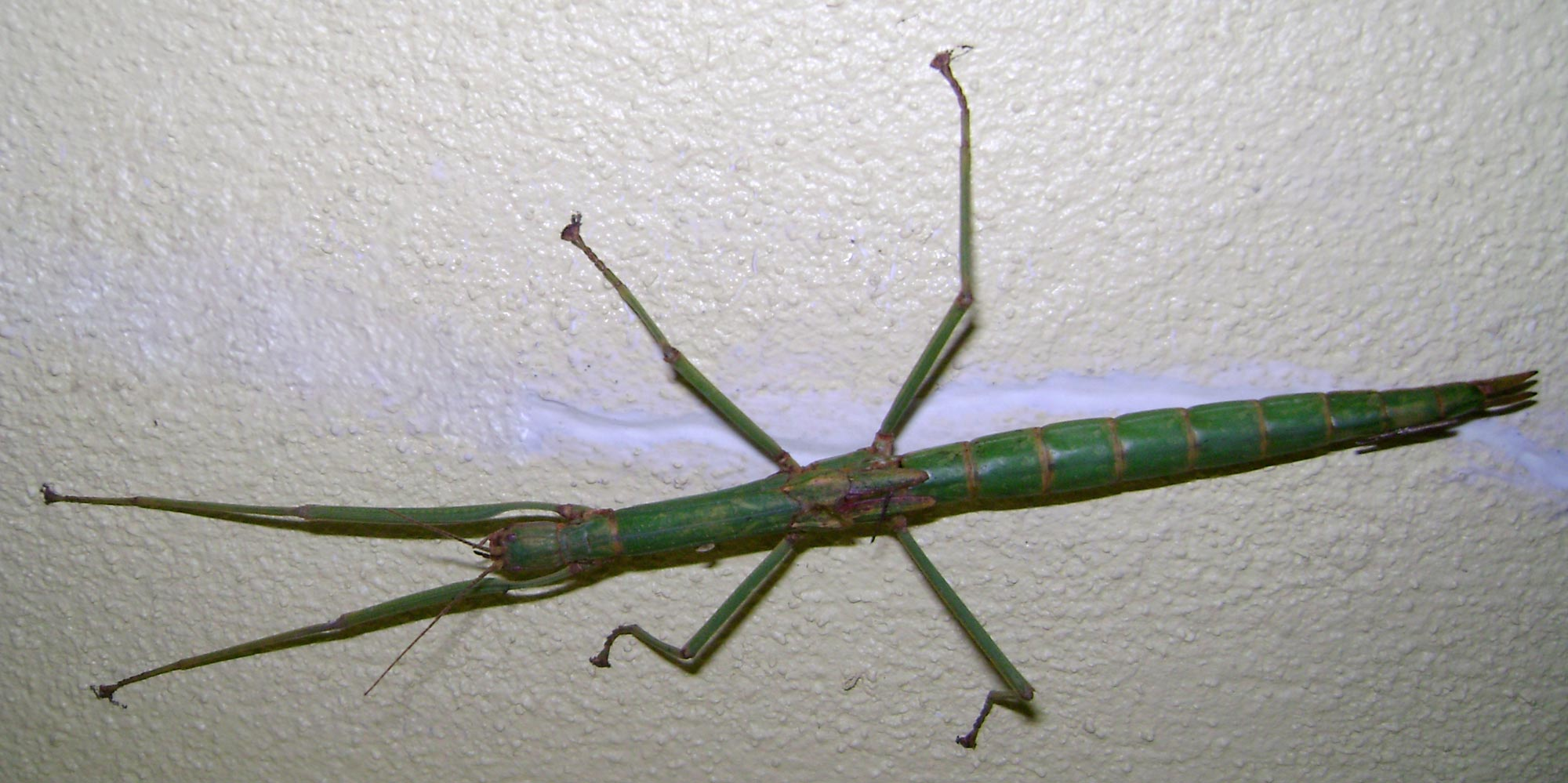
- Graeffea crouanii

Scientific classification
- Domain: Eukaryota
- Kingdom: Animalia
- Phylum: Arthropoda
- Class: Insecta
- Order: Phasmatodea
- Family: Phasmatidae
- Genus: Graeffea; Brunner von Wattenwyl, 1868

= Graeffea =

Genus of insects

Graeffea is a genus of phasmids belonging to the family Phasmatidae.

Species:

- Graeffea bojei (Haan, 1842)
- Graeffea crouanii (Le Guillou, 1841)
- Graeffea doederleini Günther, 1929
- Graeffea erythroptera (Olivier, 1792)
- Graeffea inconspicua Pylnov, 1911
- Graeffea integra Giglio-Tos, 1910
- Graeffea leveri (Günther, 1937)
- Graeffea lifuensis Sharp, 1898
- Graeffea meridionalis (Günther, 1932)
- Graeffea minor Brunner von Wattenwyl, 1868
- Graeffea seychellensis Ferrière, 1912
