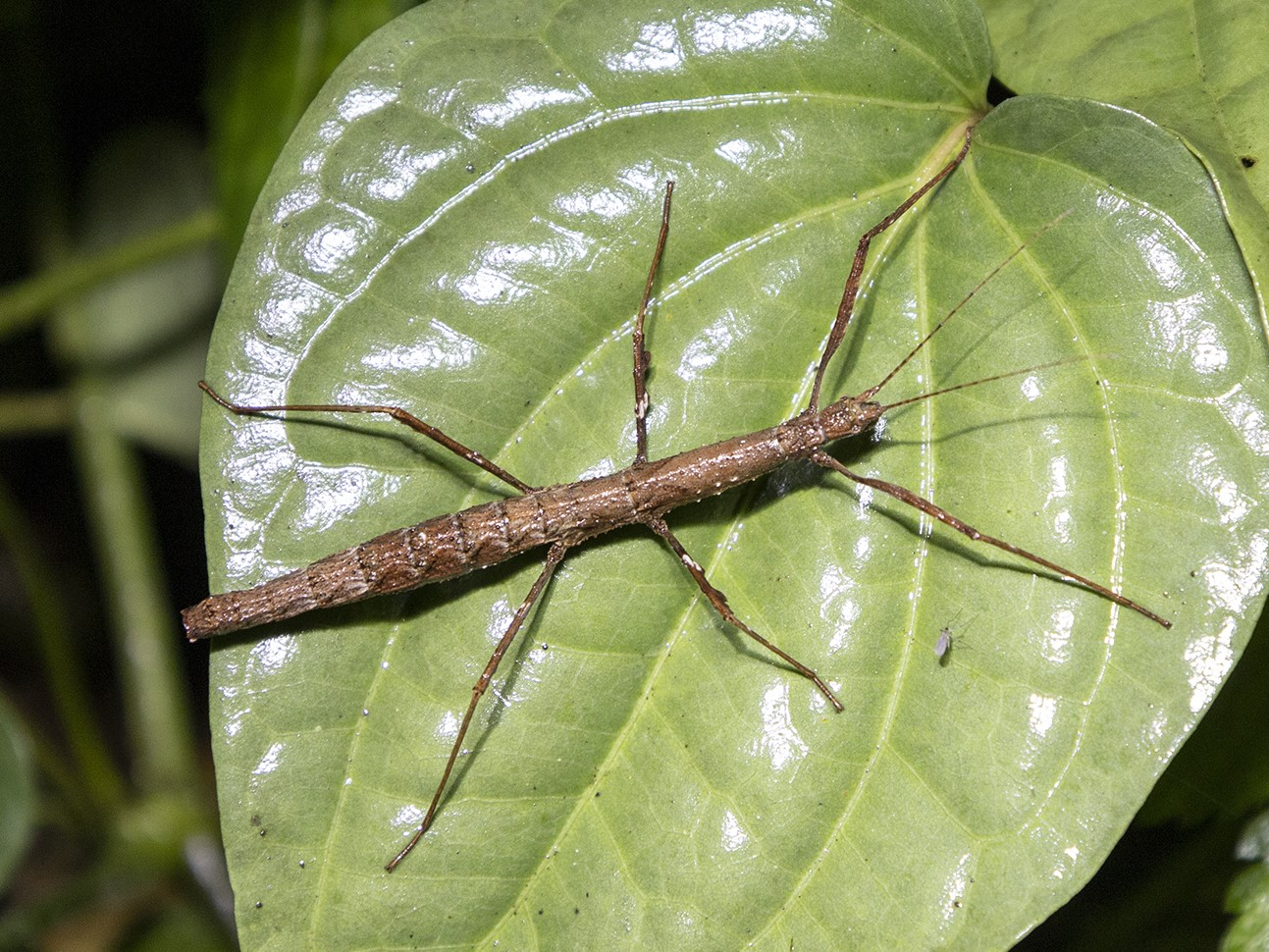

Scientific classification
- Domain: Eukaryota
- Kingdom: Animalia
- Phylum: Arthropoda
- Class: Insecta
- Order: Phasmatodea
- Infraorder: Anareolatae
- Family: Lonchodidae
- Genus: Menexenus; Stål, 1875

Synonyms
- Menexus Brunner von Wattenwyl, 1893; Menexus Stål, 1875

= Menexenus (phasmid) =

Genus of stick insects

Menexenus is a genus of stick insects in the family Lonchodidae.

== Species list ==
The following species are recognised in the genus Menexenus:

- Menexenus adveniens Brunner von Wattenwyl, 1907
- Menexenus lacertinus (Westwood, 1848)
- Menexenus nudiusculus Hausleithner, 1992
- Menexenus obtusespinosus Sinéty, 1901
- Menexenus perdentatus Brunner von Wattenwyl, 1907
- Menexenus quadrilobatus Brunner von Wattenwyl, 1907
- Menexenus rotunginus Giglio-Tos, 1914
- Menexenus semiarmatus (Westwood, 1848)
- Menexenus tenmalainus Günther, 1938
