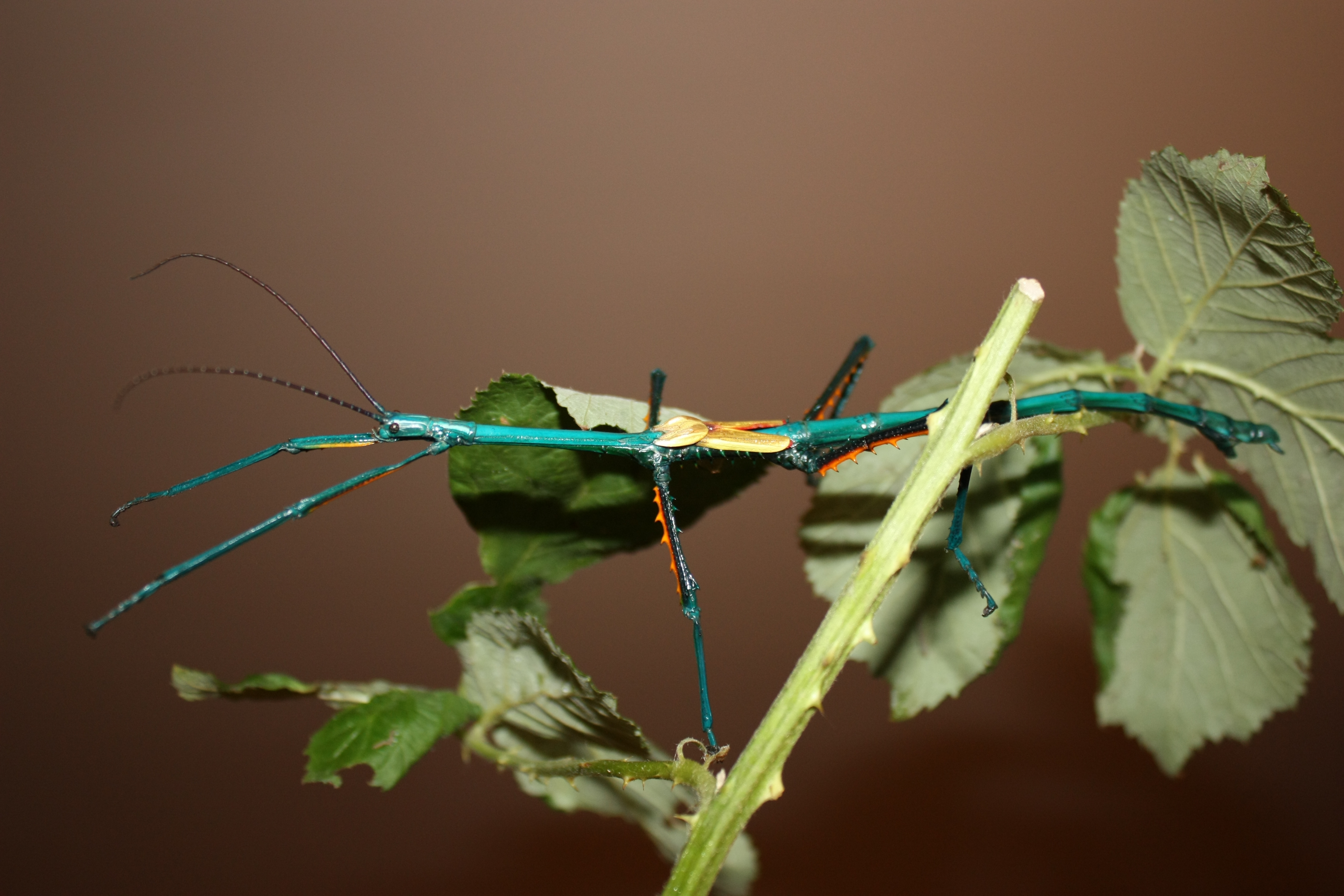
- Male Achrioptera fallax

Scientific classification
- Domain: Eukaryota
- Kingdom: Animalia
- Phylum: Arthropoda
- Class: Insecta
- Order: Phasmatodea
- Family: Phasmatidae
- Tribe: Achriopterini
- Genus: Achrioptera; Coquerel, 1861

= Achrioptera =

Genus of stick insects

Achrioptera is a genus of stick insects first described in 1861. It is one of two genera in the tribe Achriopterini, the other being Glawiana. Species in the genus Achrioptera occur in Africa, including Madagascar. Although they are brightly colored, members of Achrioptera are able to effectively mimic thorny twigs and sticks for camouflage.

== Species ==
It includes the following species:

- Achrioptera cliquennoisi Hennemann & Conle, 2004
- Achrioptera fallax Coquerel, 1861
- Achrioptera gracilis Hennemann & Conle, 2004
- Achrioptera griveaudi Paulian, 1960
- Achrioptera hugeli Cliquennois, 2021
- Achrioptera impennis Redtenbacher, 1908
- Achrioptera lobipes (Rehn, 1940)
- Achrioptera magnifica Hennemann & Conle, 2004
- Achrioptera manga (Glaw, Hawlitschek, Dunz, Goldberg & Bradler, 2019)
- Achrioptera maroloko (Glaw, Hawlitschek, Dunz, Goldberg & Bradler, 2019)
- Achrioptera punctipes (Audinet-Serville, 1838)
- Achrioptera pygmaea Redtenbacher, 1908
- Achrioptera spinosissima (Kirby, 1891)
