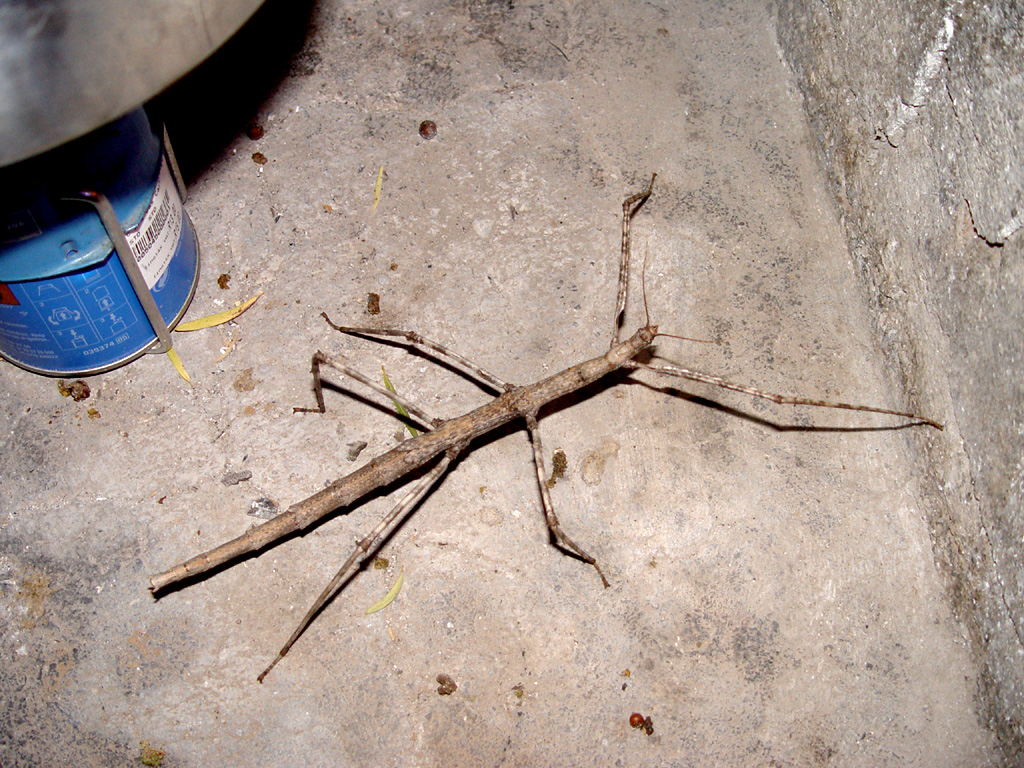
- Bactrododema tiaratum

Scientific classification
- Kingdom: Animalia
- Phylum: Arthropoda
- Clade: Pancrustacea
- Class: Insecta
- Order: Phasmatodea
- Infraorder: Anareolatae
- Family: Phasmatidae; Leach, 1815

Diversity
- 10 subfamilies (but see text)

Synonyms
- Phasmidae Gray, 1835

= Phasmatidae =

Phasmatidae Temporal range: Cenomanian–Recent

Family of stick insects

The Phasmatidae are a family of the stick insects (order Phasmatodea). They belong to the superfamily Anareolatae of suborder Verophasmatodea.

Like many of their relatives, the Phasmatidae are capable of regenerating limbs and commonly reproduce by parthenogenesis. Despite their bizarre, even threatening appearance, they are harmless to humans.

The Phasmatidae contain some of the largest insects in existence. An undescribed species of Phryganistria is the longest living insect known, able to reach a total length of 64 cm (25.2 inch).

== Subfamilies ==
Following the Phasmid Study Group, nine subfamilies are recognized in the Phasmatidae. Other treatments differ, sometimes recognizing as few as six.

The Lonchodinae were historically often placed in the Diapheromeridae, the other family of the Anareolatae. The Phasmatinae are often expanded to include the two tribes here separated as the Clitumninae, while the Extatosomatinae may be similarly included in the Tropidoderinae as a tribe.

The Phasmid Species File currently lists:

- Cladomorphinae (found in: Southern America, Madagascar, Java, Sulawesi)
- Clitumninae (sometimes in Phasmatinae)
- Extatosomatinae: contains the single genus Extatosoma Gray, 1833 (found in Australasia)
- Lonchodinae (sometimes in Diapheromeridae: now includes the Eurycanthinae)
- Megacraniinae (Asia, Australasia)
- Pachymorphinae
- Phasmatinae (sometimes includes Clitumninae)
- Platycraninae (Asia, Australasia)
- Tropidoderinae (sometimes includes Extatosomatinae)
- Xeroderinae

In addition, the extinct subfamily Echinosomiscinae is known from the genus Echinosomiscus from the Burmese amber.

In addition, a number of Phasmatidae taxa are here considered incertae sedis:

- Tribe Achriopterini (Africa, Madagascar)
  - Achrioptera Coquerel, 1861
  - Glawiana Hennemann & Conle, 2004
- Tribe not placed
  - Monoiognosis Cliquennois & Brock, 2004 (Mauritius)
  - Spathomorpha Cliquennois, 2005 (Madagascar)

Consequently, numerous taxa are transferred or re-transferred to other genera, which results in 22 new or revised combinations or status of genera and species.

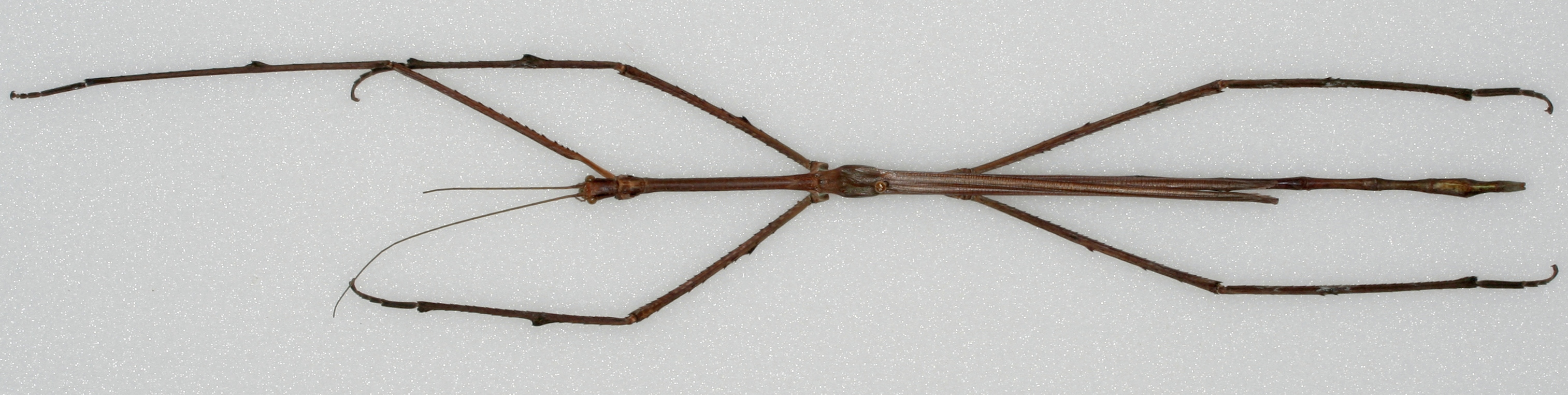
Male Phobaeticus chani, "Chan's megastick", one of the world's longest insect species

== See also ==
- James Wood-Mason
- List of Phasmatidae genera
