= List of Phasmatodea of Australia =

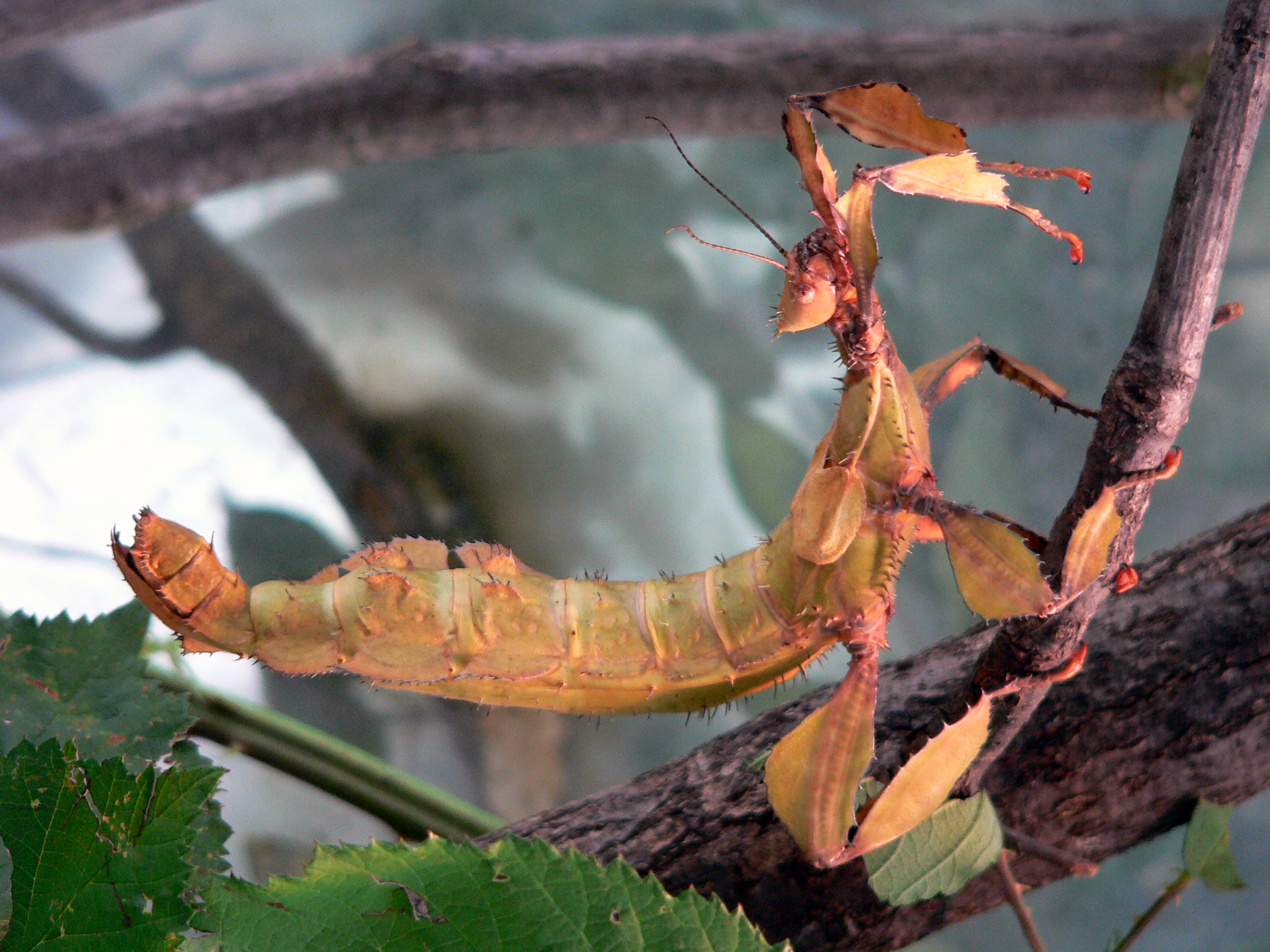
Extatosoma tiaratum

This is a list of the Australian Phasmatodea. There are approximately 150 species.

The list is organized from family, to subfamily, genus and then species.

== Phasmatidae ==
subfamily: Platycraninae

genus: Anophelepis

- Anophelepis telesphorus

genus: Graeffea

- Graeffea coccophaga

genus: Megacrania

- Megacrania batesii
- Megacrania alpheus

genus: Echetlus

- Echetlus peristhenes

subfamily: Palophinae

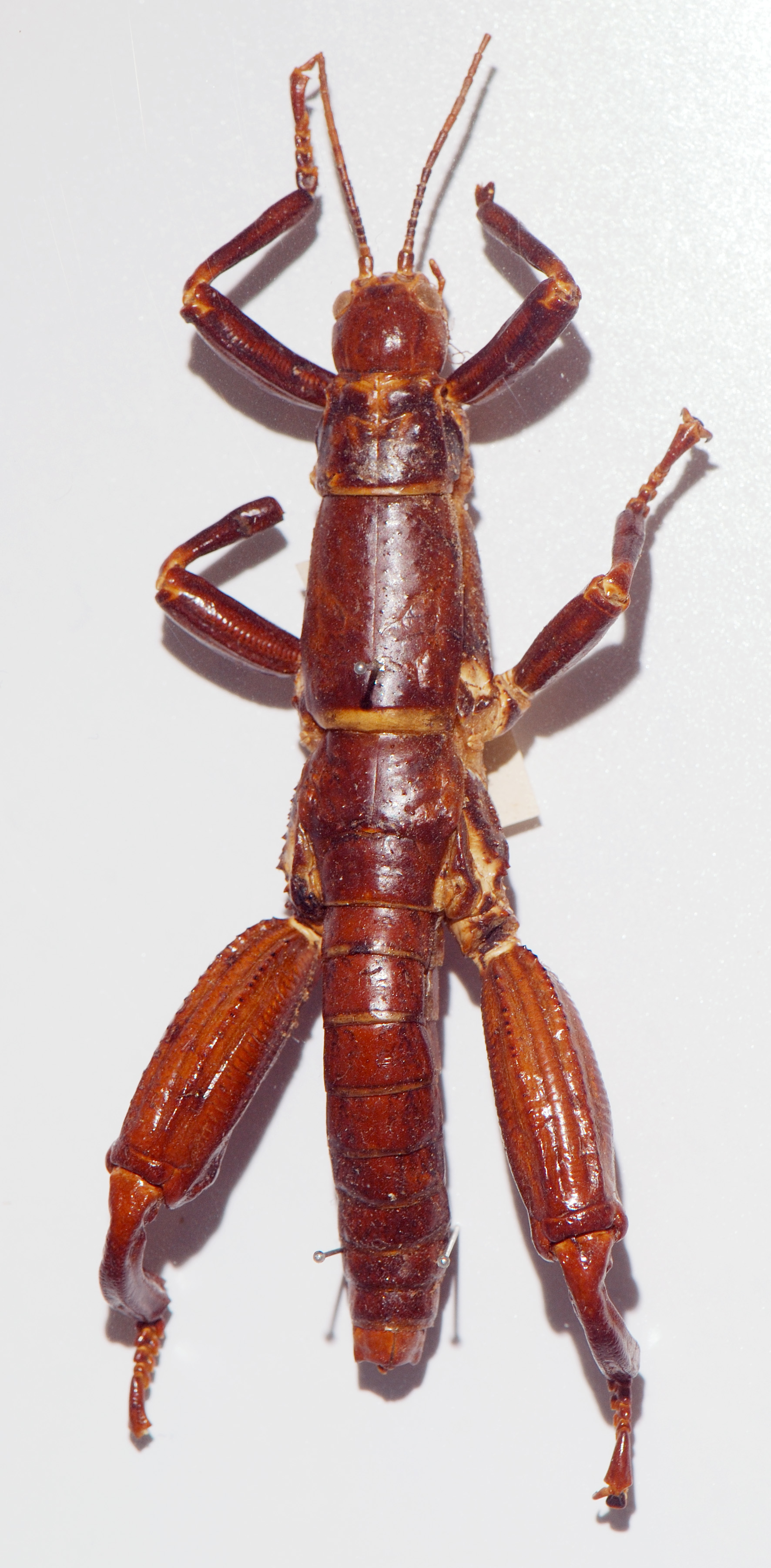
Dryococelus australis

genus: Palophus

- (3 undescribed species)

subfamily: Eurycanthinae

genus: Eurycantha

- Eurycantha sifia

genus: Dryococelus

- Dryococelus australis

subfamily: Lonchodinae

genus: Lonchodes

- Lonchodes caurus
- Lonchodes longiceps

genus: Carausius

- Carausius insularis
- Carausius macerrimus

genus: Hyrtacus

- Hyrtacus coenosa
- Hyrtacus eutrachelia
- Hyrtacus peridromes
- Hyrtacus tuberculatus
- Hyrtacus imitans
- Hyrtacus carinata
- Hyrtacus striatus
- (16 undescribed species)

genus: Marcenia

- Marcenia frenchi
- Marcenia gracilis

genus: Austrocarausius

- Austrocarausius mercurius
- Austrocarausius nigropunctatus

subfamily: Pachymorphinae

genus: Acanthoderus

- Acanthoderus spinosus

genus: Pachymorpha

- Pachymorpha squalida
- Pachymorpha simplicipes
- Pachymorpha pasithoe
- (14 undescribed species)

subfamily: Phasmatinae

genus: Ctenomorpha

- Ctenomorpha chronus
- Ctenomorpha acheron
- Ctenomorpha haworthii
- Ctenomorpha macleayi
- Ctenomorpha caprella
- Ctenomorpha salmacis

genus: Acrophylla Gray

- Acrophylla titan
- Acrophylla cornuta
- Acrophylla nubilosa
- Acrophylla paula
- Acrophylla ligula
- Acrophylla wuelfingi

genus: Eurycnema

Eurycnema goliath nymph

- Eurycnema goliath
- Eurycnema osiris

genus: Baculum

- Baculum stilpnoides

genus: Anchiale

- Anchiale austrotessulata
- Anchiale briareus
- Anchiale maculata
- Anchiale spinicollis

genus: Arphax

- Arphax brunneus
- Arphax australis
- Arphax dolomedes
- Arphax signatus
- Arphax michaelseni

genus: Clitarchus

- Clitarchus laeviusculus
- Clitarchus longipes

genus: Hermarchus

- Hermarchus polynesicus

genus: Vetilia

- Vetilia enceladus
- Vetilia thoon

genus: Onchestus

- Onchestus gorgus
- Onchestus pasimachus
- Onchestus rentzi
- (2 undescribed species)

genus: Acanthomima

- Acanthomima periphanes
- Acanthomima rhipheus

genus: Paronchestus

- Paronchestus charon

genus: Ctenomorphodes

- Ctenomorphodes briareus
- Ctenomorphodes tessulatus
- Ctenomorphodes aliena
- (3 undescribed species)

subfamily: Xeroderinae

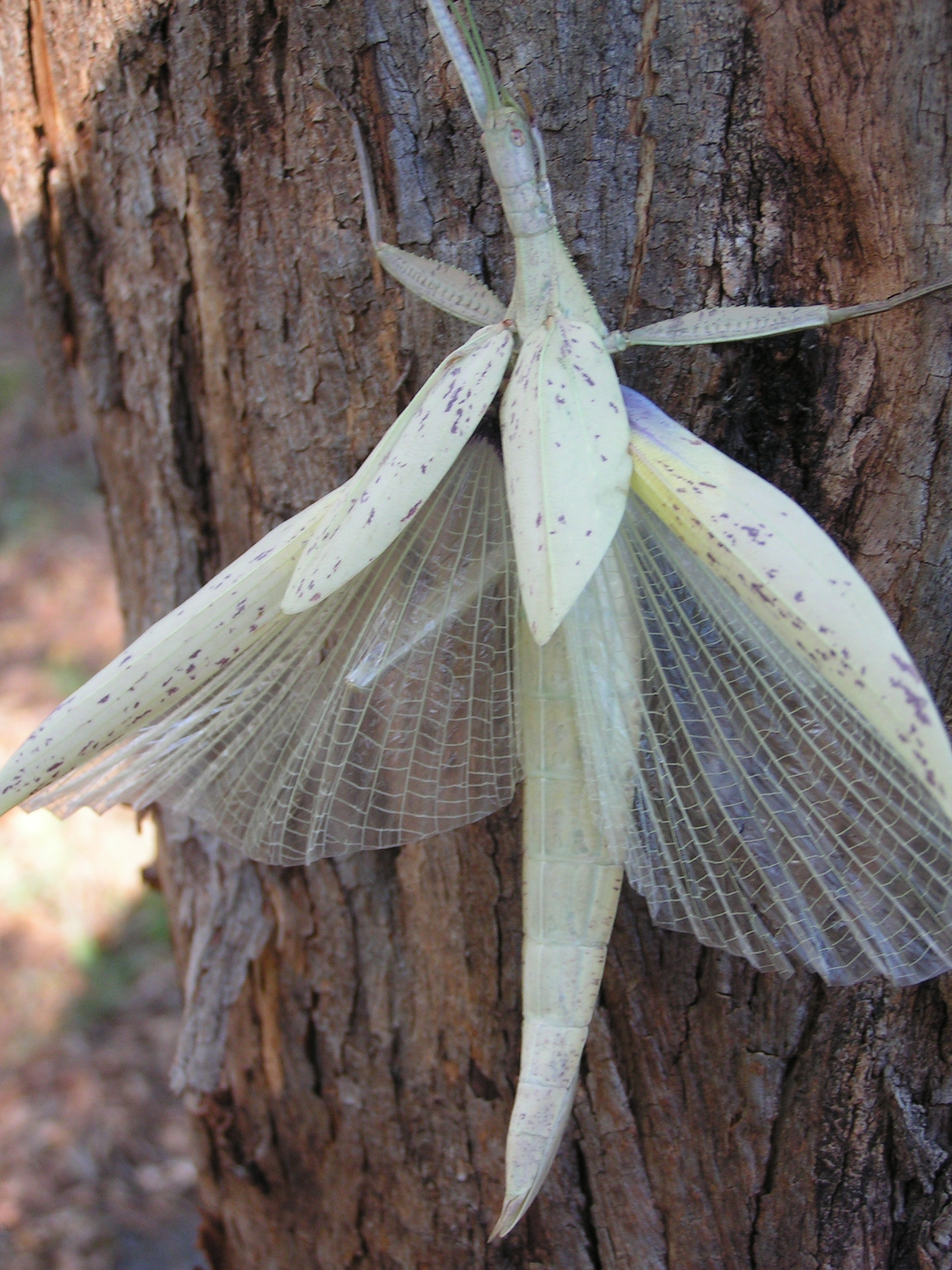
Tropidoderus childrenii

genus: Xeroderus

- Xeroderus kirbii
- (1 undescribed species)

genus: Cooktownia

- Cooktownia plana

subfamily: Tropidoderinae

genus: Extatosoma

- Extatosoma tiaratum
- Extatosoma popa

genus: Podacanthus

- Podacanthus typhon
- Podacanthus viridiroseus
- Podacanthus wilkinsoni
- (1 undescribed species)

genus: Tropidoderus

- Tropidoderus childrenii
- Tropidoderus rhodomus
- Tropidoderus michaelseni
- Tropidoderus gracilifemur
- Tropidoderus prasina

genus: Lysicles

- Lysicles hippolytus
- Lysicles insignis

genus: Vasilissa

- Vasilissa walkeri

genus: Didymuria

- Didymuria violences

genus: Malandania

- Malandania pulchra

unplaced genera:

genus: Bacillus

- Bacillus peristhenellus

genus: Eubulides

- Eubulides spuria

genus: Austroclonistria

- Austroclonistria serrulata

genus: Denhama

- Denhama aussa

== Phylliidae ==
subfamily: Phylliinae

genus: Phyllium

- phyllium monteithei

genus: Nanophyllium

- Nanophyllium Australianum

subfamily: Necrosciinae

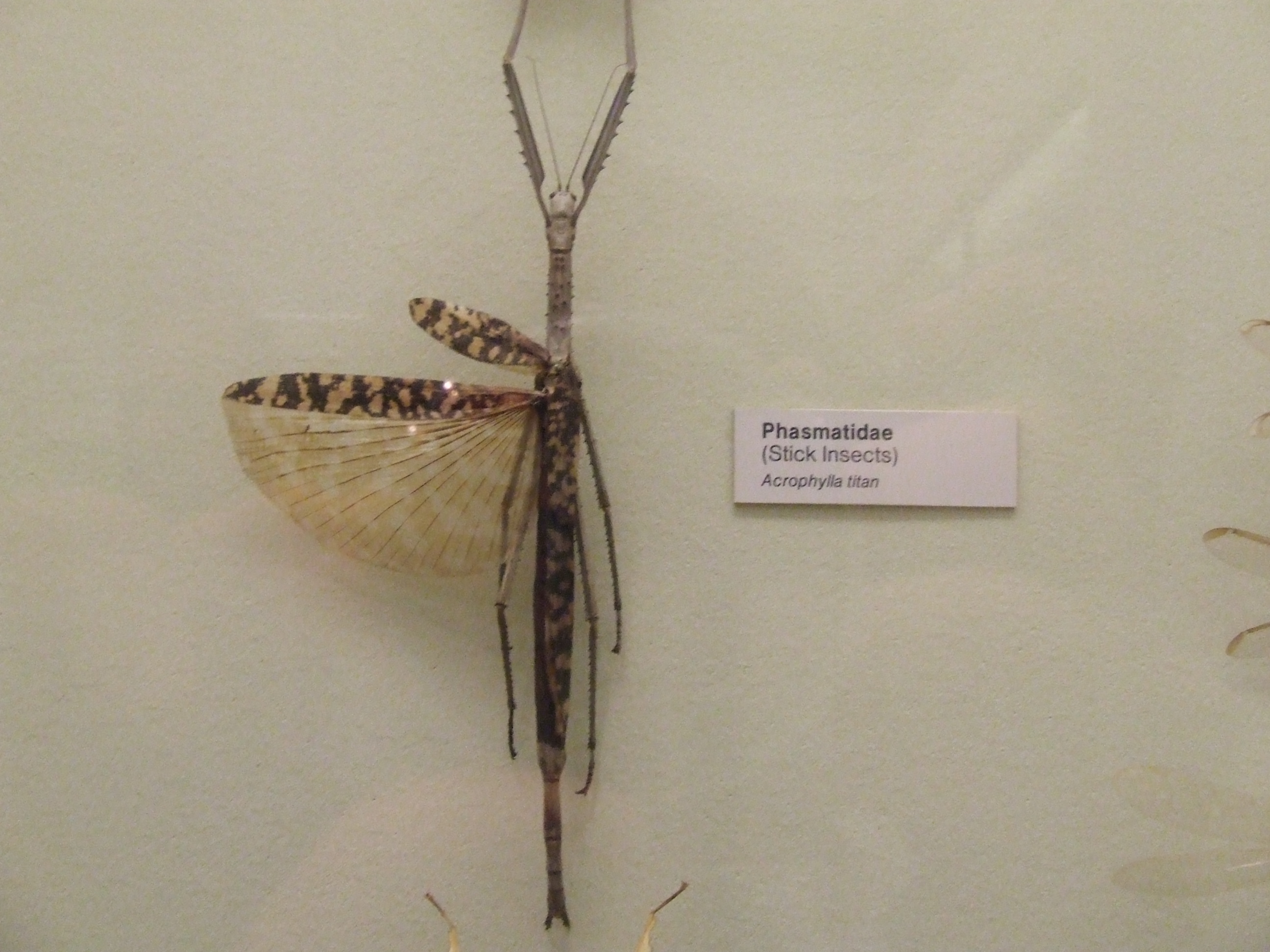
Acrophylla titan

genus: Necroscia

- Necroscia bella

genus: Sipyloidea

- Sipyloidea carterus
- Sipyloidea filiformis
- Sipyloidea gracilipes
- Sipyloidea nelida
- Sipyloidea ovabdita
- Sipyloidea similis
- (13 undescribed species)

genus: Haaniella

- Haaniella grayii

genus: Anasceles

- (1 undescribed species)

genus: Mesaner

- Mesaner sarpedon

genus: Parasipyloidea

- Parasipyloidea aberrata
- Parasipyloidea annulata
- Parasipyloidea granulosa
- Parasipyloidea ignotus
- Parasipyloidea spurcata
- Parasipyloidea tener
- Parasipyloidea cercata
- Parasipyloidea strumosa
- Parasipyloidea pallida
- (11 undescribed species)

genus: Parasosibia

- Parasosibia australica

genus: Neopromachus

- Neopromachus sordidus

genus: Malandella

- Malandella queenslandica

genus: Scionecra

- Scionecra queenslandica

== See also ==
- List of Australian stick insects and mantids
- Phasmatodea
- Order Phasmatodea, Distribution Map
