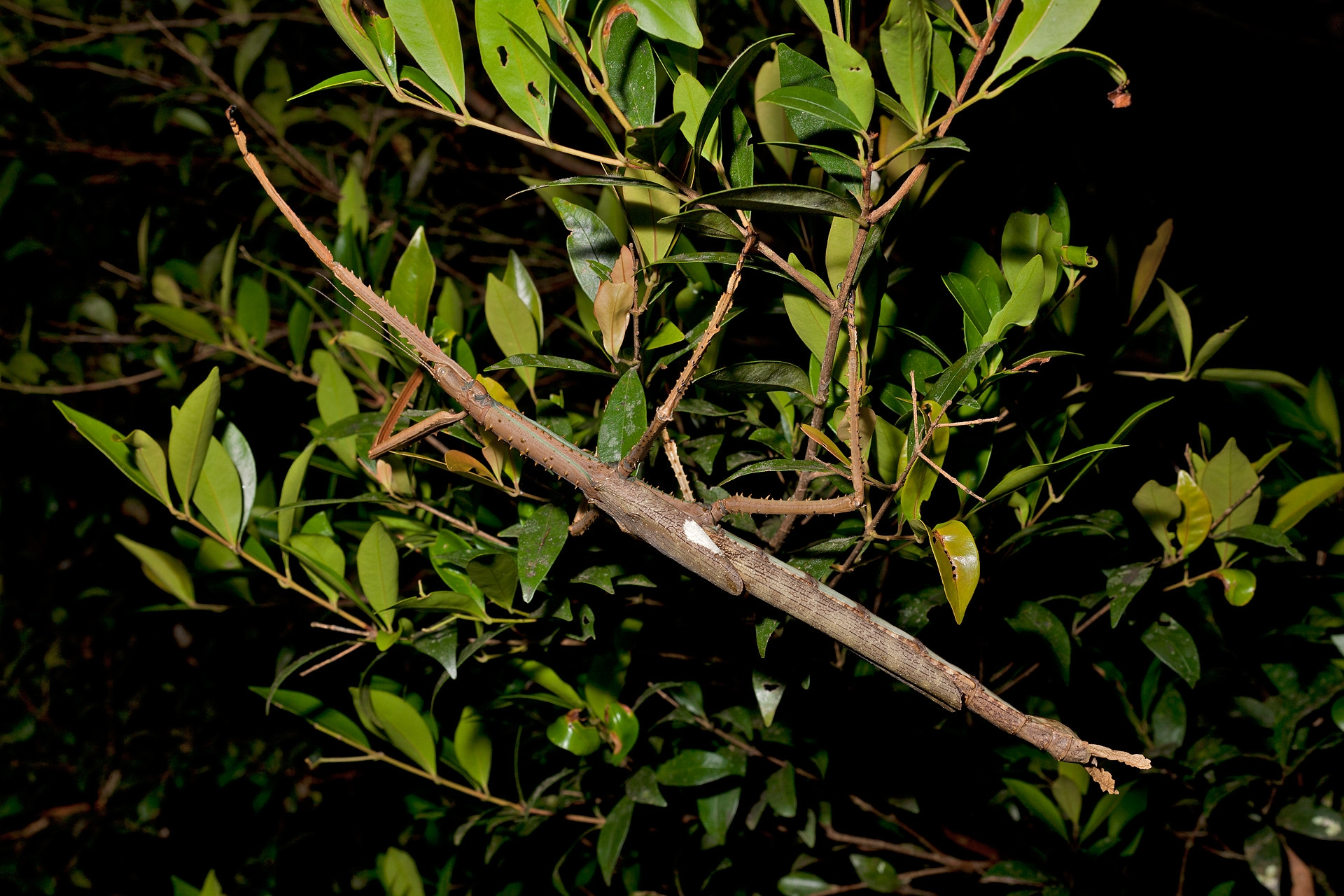
- Holotype female in nature

Scientific classification
- Kingdom: Animalia
- Phylum: Arthropoda
- Clade: Pancrustacea
- Class: Insecta
- Order: Phasmatodea
- Family: Phasmatidae
- Subfamily: Phasmatinae
- Tribe: Phasmatini
- Genus: Acrophylla
- Species: A. alta

Binomial name
- Acrophylla alta Coupland & Emmott, 2025

= Acrophylla alta =

Species of stick insect

Acrophylla alta is a species of stick insect in the tribe Phasmatini described in 2025.

Named the Highlands Giant Acrophylla, this species was found in the Atherton Tablelands: highland tropical forests of Queensland (Millaa Millaa is the type locality). The species was described by scientists Ross M. Coupland and Angus J. Emmott based on two female specimens. The holotype was collected by Coupland in November 2024 and the paratype by van Oosterzee, Preece and Emmott in February 2025, and both are lodged at the Queensland Museum.

== Description ==
This species of stick insect is notable in that it may be the heaviest insect in Australia, heavier than the giant burrowing cockroach. One individual weighed 44 g and this may mitigate heat loss in its high altitude environment. The species can be distinguished from other species in the genus Acrophylla by its 265–279 mm long body (c.f. A. titan which is 200–260 mm), and its large (4 x >6 mm) pale eggs that have dense, deep pitting.

The species epithet alta refers to the high elevation at which this species is known to occur, higher than 900 m above sea level. Individuals of this species occupy the canopies of very tall trees from 30 to 60 m high, making it difficult to study them.

== Gallery ==
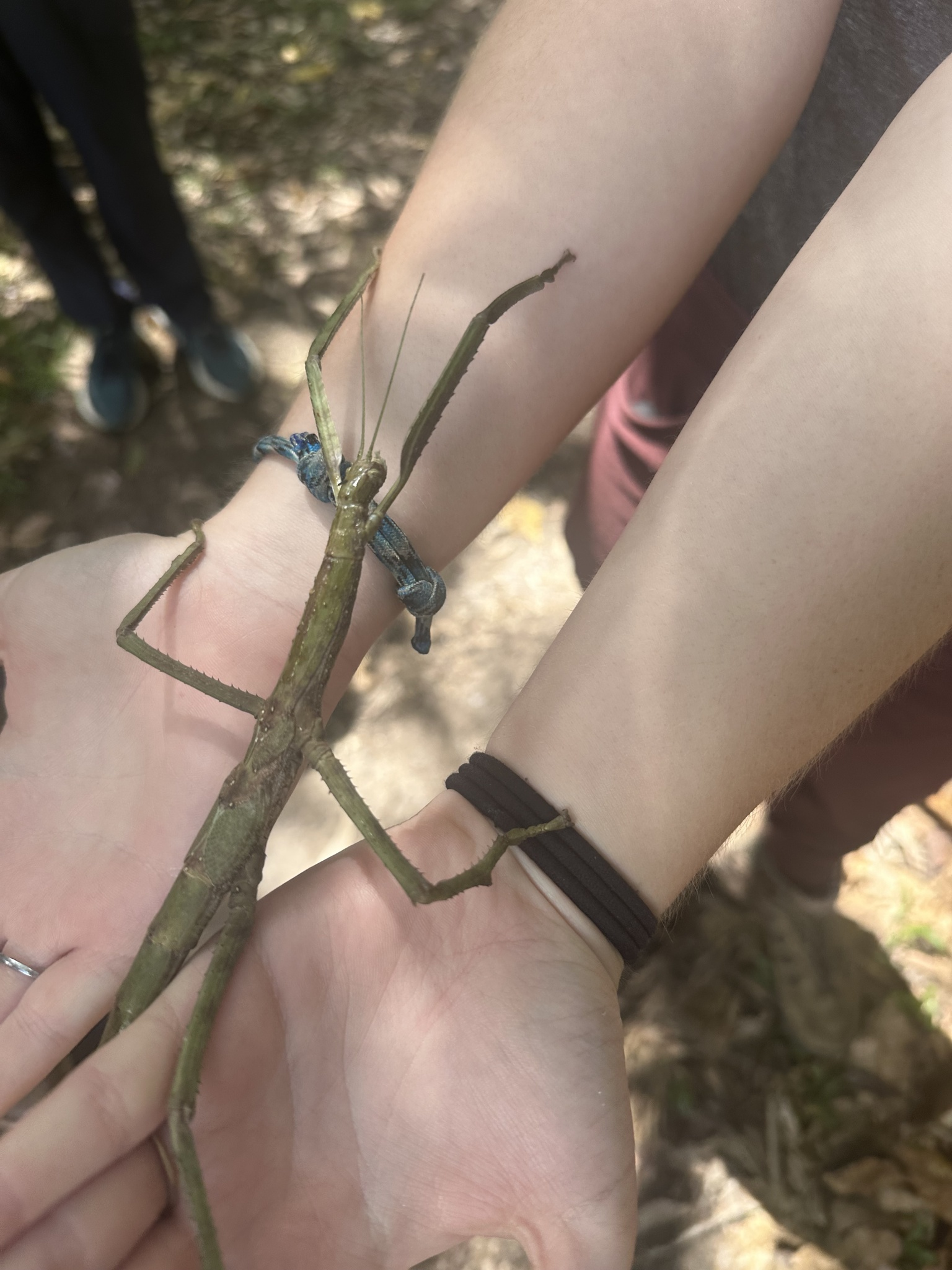
Acrophylla alta with human for scale

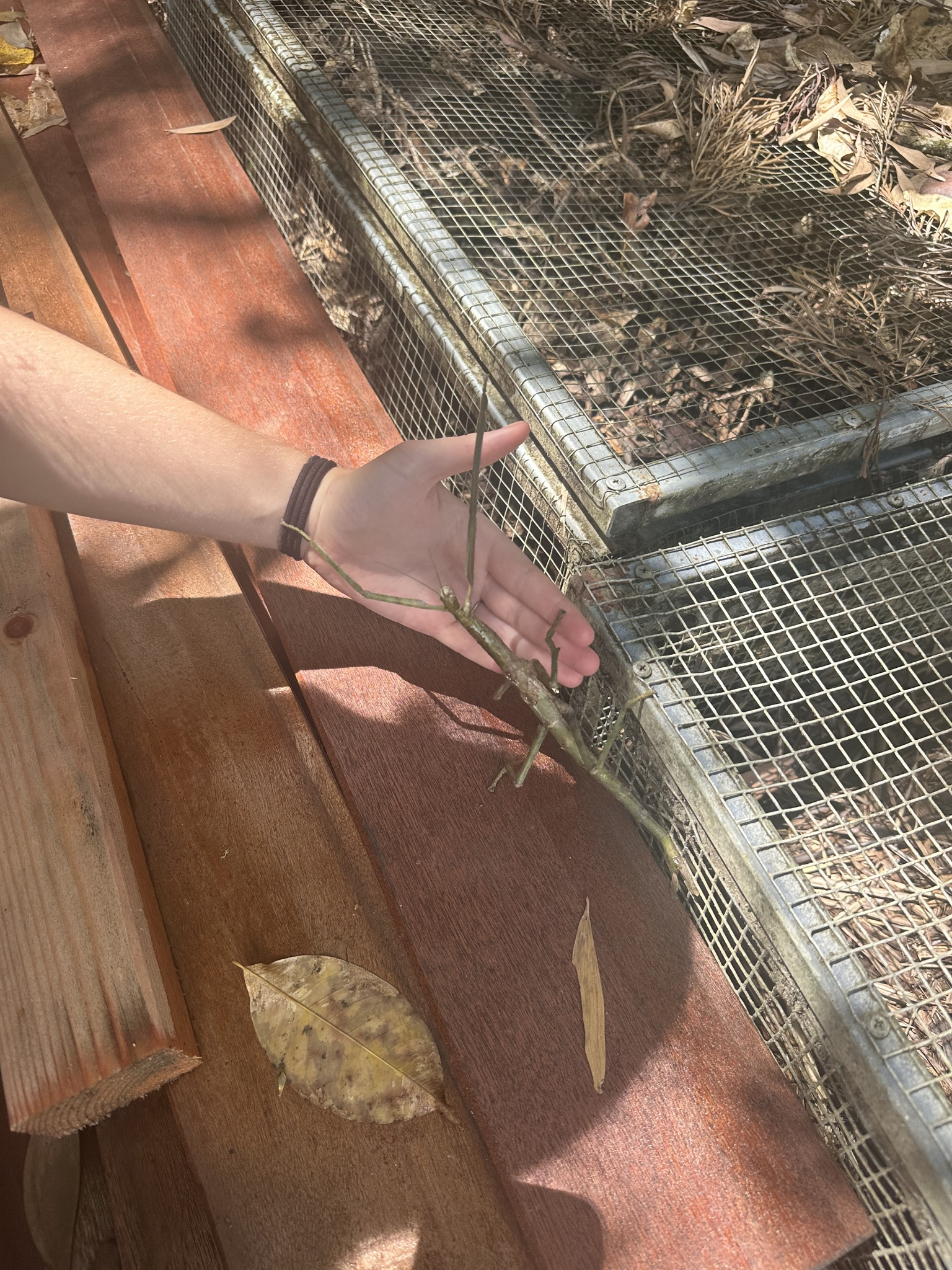
The long body of A. alta
