= Pink-winged phasma =

Scientific classification
- Kingdom: Animalia
- Phylum: Arthropoda
- Clade: Pancrustacea
- Class: Insecta
- Order: Phasmatodea
- Family: Phasmatidae
- Genus: Podacanthus
- Species: P. typhon

Binomial name
- Podacanthus typhon Gray, (1835)

Species of insect

The pink-winged phasma (Podacanthus typhon) is a species of stick insect that is endemic to Australia.

== Range ==
This species is endemic to Australia where it is found along the South-East coast in the Murray-Darling basin, New South Wales.

== Identification ==
The mesothorax of the pink-winged phasma is reduced in size and has small spines. The large wings are attached to the mesothorax. Underneath the body are spines that cover a small part of the thorax and abdomen. The legs are reddish pink. P. typhon is a small stick insect compared to the titan stick insect. Its size is similar to the children's stick insect, reaching a length of about 110 mm.

== See also ==
- List of Australian stick insects and mantids
