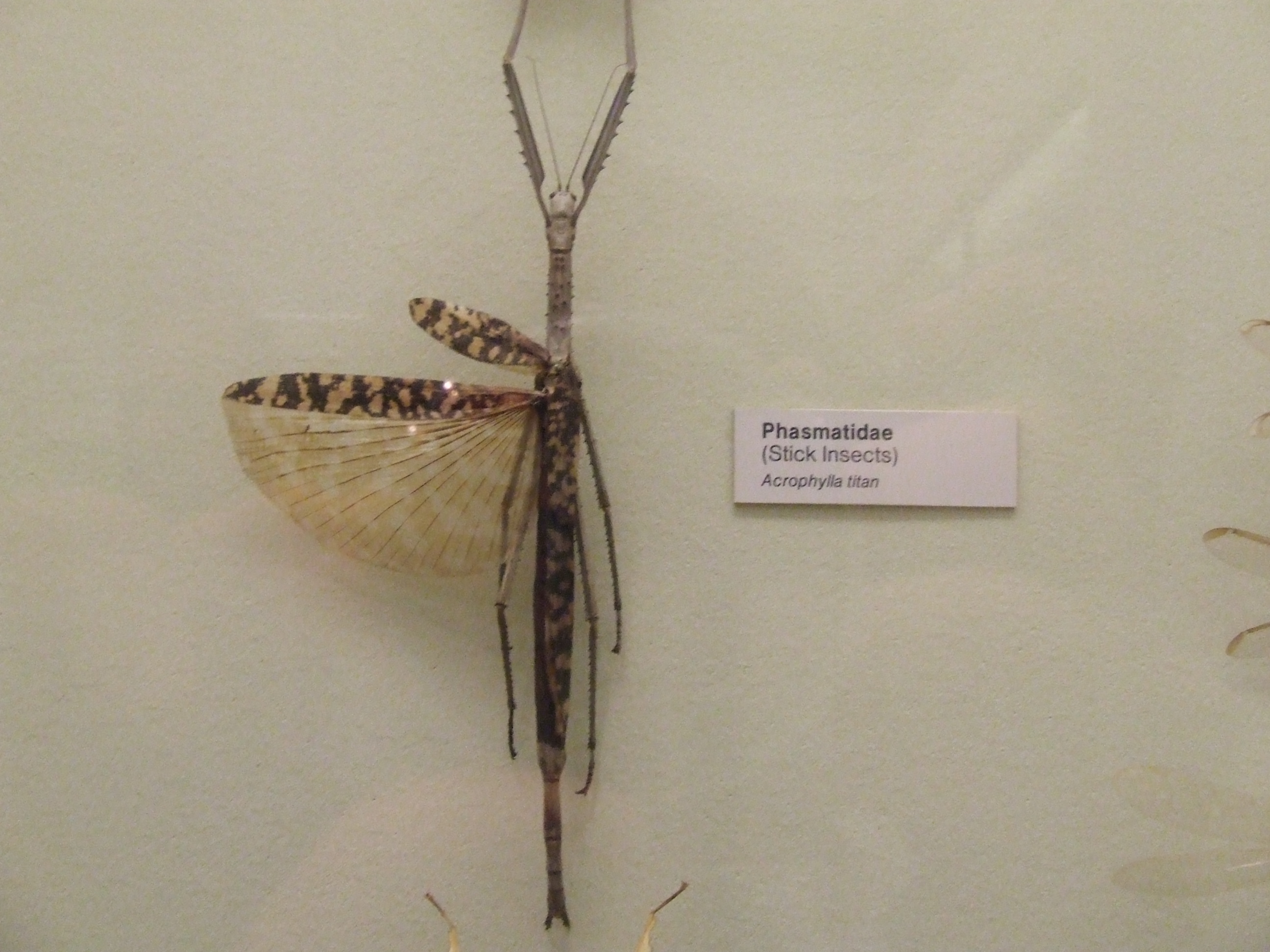
- Adult female (pinned specimen)

Conservation status
- Least Concern (IUCN 3.1)

Scientific classification
- Kingdom: Animalia
- Phylum: Arthropoda
- Clade: Pancrustacea
- Class: Insecta
- Order: Phasmatodea
- Family: Phasmatidae
- Subfamily: Phasmatinae
- Tribe: Phasmatini
- Genus: Acrophylla
- Species: A. titan

Binomial name
- Acrophylla titan Macleay, 1827

Synonyms
- Phasma titan; Diura titan Gray GR, 1833

= Acrophylla titan =

Species of stick insect

Acrophylla titan, the titan stick insect, is the third-longest stick insect found in Australia. First described by William Sharp Macleay in 1826, it was considered to be the longest stick insect in the world until the discovery of Ctenomorpha gargantua.

It is native to south-east Queensland and New South Wales.

== Description ==
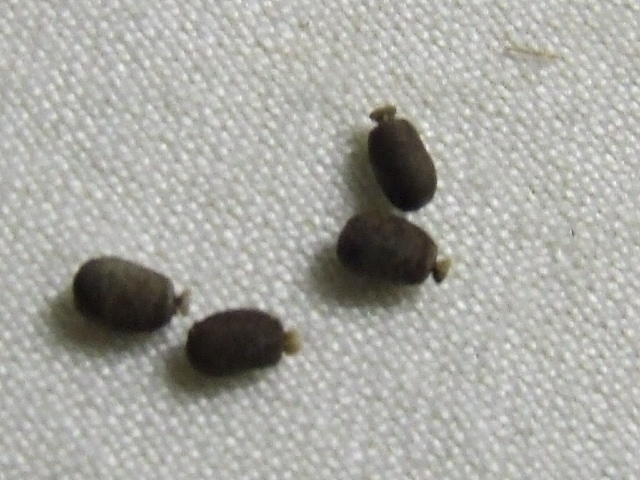
Titan stick insect eggs

Titan stick insects are pale brown-grey in color and can grow up to 26 centimetres (10 in) in body length. Their long, wavy cerci are a unique trait of the species. Males and females can be easily distinguished due to the females being larger and having sharp spines on the legs. Males are able to fly but females are flightless.

=== Breeding ===
A. titan breeds during winter/summer. During the mating process, the male connects his abdomen to the lower part of the female's egg compartment. Mating can take up to 40 minutes and is repeated several times. A single female will typically produce 200 to 1000 eggs in her lifetime. However, A. titan also holds the record for most eggs laid by a single phasmid due to one female laying over 2,050 eggs.

The females then flick their eggs to the ground. The eggs look similar to those of the Children's stick insect (Tropidoderus childrenii) but they are black-grey with a small white growth. Ants pick them up and eat the growth, and leave the egg in the refinery where they hatch.

== See also ==
- List of Australian stick insects and mantids
- Spur legged phasmid
- Children's stick insect
- Goliath stick insect
