= List of stick insects and mantids of Australia =

These are incomplete lists of mantids and stick insects found in Australia.

== Mantids ==
- Archimantis latistyla - large brown mantis
- Archimantis monstrosa - monster mantis
- Orthodera ministralis - garden mantis
- Pseudomantis albofimbriata - false garden mantis
- Sphodropoda tristis - burying mantis
- Tenodera australasiae - purple-winged mantis

== Stick insects ==
- Acrophylla titan - titan stick insect
- Anchiale austrotessulata - tesselated phasmid
- Didymuria violescens - spur-legged phasmid
- Eurycnema goliath - goliath stick insect
- Eurycnema osiris - Darwin stick insect
- Onchestus rentzi - crowned stick insect
- Podocanthus typhon - pink-winged phasma
- Tropidoderus childrenii - Children's stick insect
