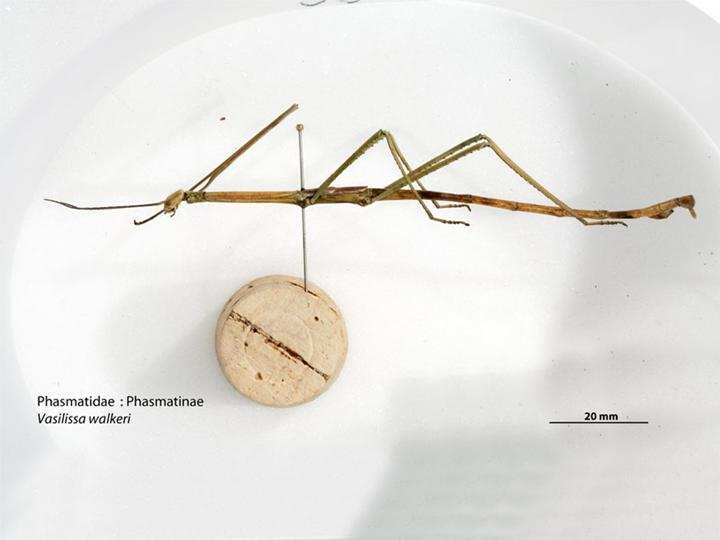
- Vasilissa walkeri

Scientific classification
- Domain: Eukaryota
- Kingdom: Animalia
- Phylum: Arthropoda
- Class: Insecta
- Order: Phasmatodea
- Family: Phasmatidae
- Genus: Vasilissa; Kirby, 1896
- Species: V. walkeri

Binomial name
- Vasilissa walkeri Kirby, 1896

= Vasilissa walkeri =

Species of stick insect

Vasilissa is a monotypic genus of phasmids belonging to the family Phasmatidae. The only species is Vasilissa walkeri.

The species is found in Northern Australia.
