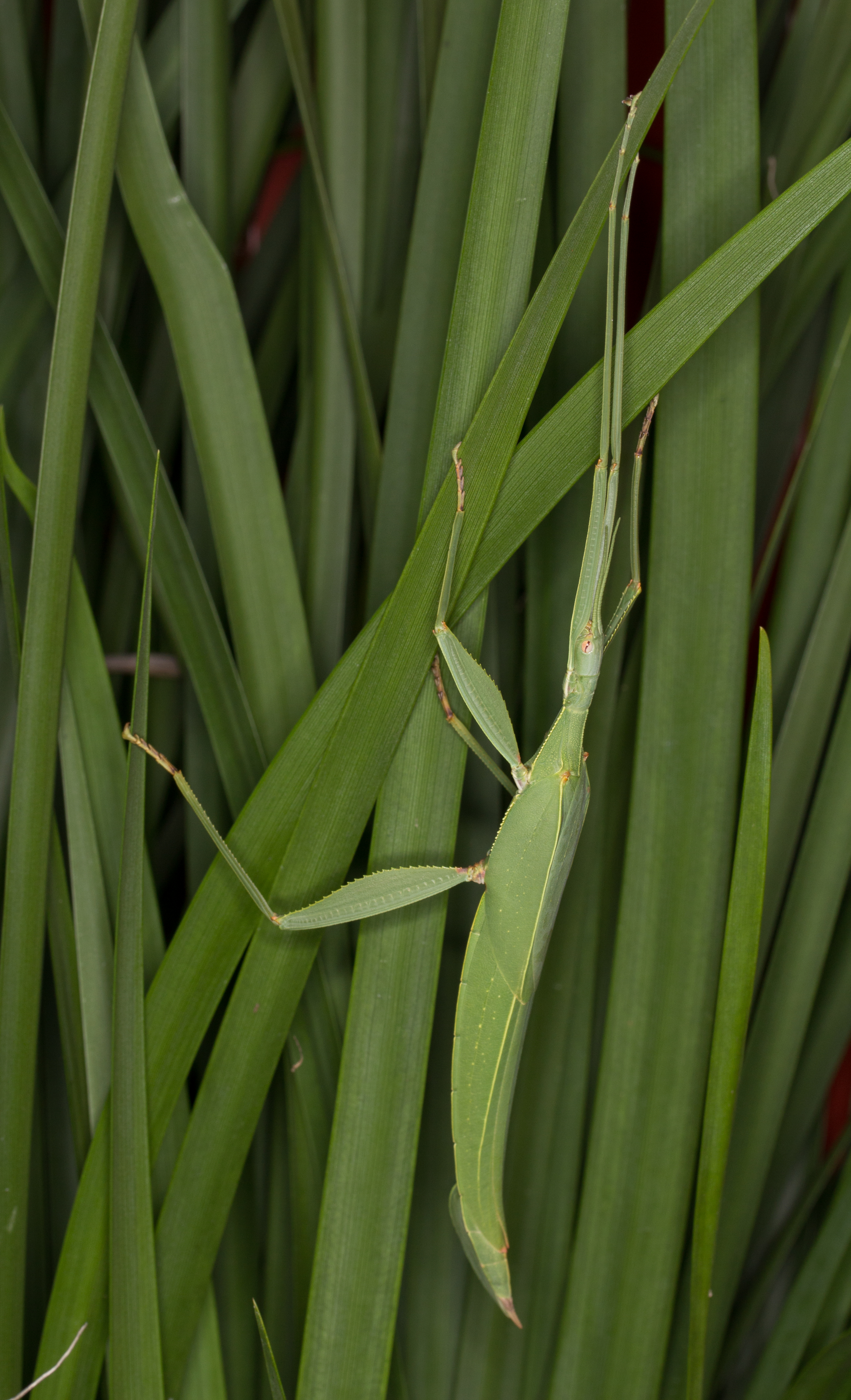
- Tropidoderus childrenii

Scientific classification
- Kingdom: Animalia
- Phylum: Arthropoda
- Clade: Pancrustacea
- Class: Insecta
- Order: Phasmatodea
- Family: Phasmatidae
- Subfamily: Tropidoderinae; Brunner von Wattenwyl, 1893

= Tropidoderinae =

Subfamily of stick insects

The Tropidoderinae are a sub-family of stick insects in the family Phasmatidae: genera are found in Madagascar, eastern Malesia including the Philippines and Australasia.

== Tribes and genera ==
=== Tribe Gigantophasmatini ===
Authority: Hennemann & Conle, 2008

- Gigantophasma Sharp, 1898

=== Tribe Monandropterini ===
Authority: Brunner von Wattenwyl, 1893 - syn. : Monandropterae Brunner von Wattenwyl, 1893

- Heterophasma Redtenbacher, 1908
- Monandroptera Serville, 1838
- Rhaphiderus Serville, 1838

=== Tribe Tropidoderini ===
Authority: Brunner von Wattenwyl, 1893

- Lysicles (insect) Stål, 1877
- Malandania Sjöstedt, 1918
- Micropodacanthus Brock & Hasenpusch, 2007
- Parapodacanthus Brock, 2003
- Paratropidoderus Brock & Hasenpusch, 2007
- Podacanthus Gray, 1833
- Tropidoderus Gray, 1835
- Didymuria Kirby, 1904
