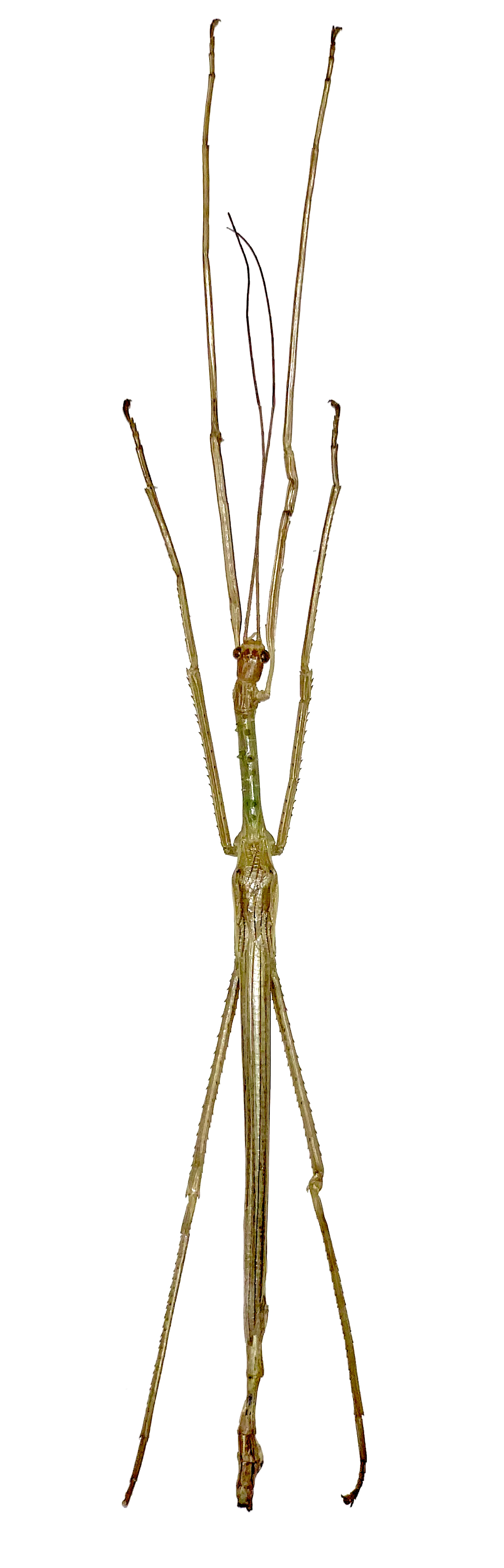
- Male specimen of Acrophylla wuelfingi

Scientific classification
- Kingdom: Animalia
- Phylum: Arthropoda
- Clade: Pancrustacea
- Class: Insecta
- Order: Phasmatodea
- Family: Phasmatidae
- Genus: Acrophylla
- Species: A. wuelfingi

Binomial name
- Acrophylla wuelfingi Redtenbacher, 1908

= Acrophylla wuelfingi =

Species of stick insect

Acrophylla wuelfingi, also commonly known as the giant northern stick insect or Wülfing's stick-insect, is a species of stick insect belonging to the taxonomic tribe Phasmatini. They live in the northern east-coast regions of Queensland, Australia.

== Habitat ==
They are only found in Queensland, Australia in the far northern parts of their east coast. They live in forest habitats of a variety of types including rainforest, eucalypt bushland, she-oak woodlands (specifically of Allocasuarina species) etc. They can also be regularly found in suburban gardens.

== Description ==
They are large and like all stick insects, they have long slender bodies with females growing to much larger sizes and being more heavily built than the males. Adult males grow to a length of 90-150 millimeters while adult females grow to a length of 180–230 millimeters, if not including the lengths of their arms outstretched. Many parts of their bodies have small spines. Small spiny knobs are located on their thorax while jagged serrations are located on their front legs.

Both sexes have wings when they mature however due females having a larger size, they cannot fly. Males can fly but only for short distances. Instead, they mostly use their wings to startle predators.

== Behavior ==
They will hang motionless within or beneath foliage and will often avoid being above them, especially while they grow larger in size. They will only move periodically to feed. They feed on a variety of plants.
