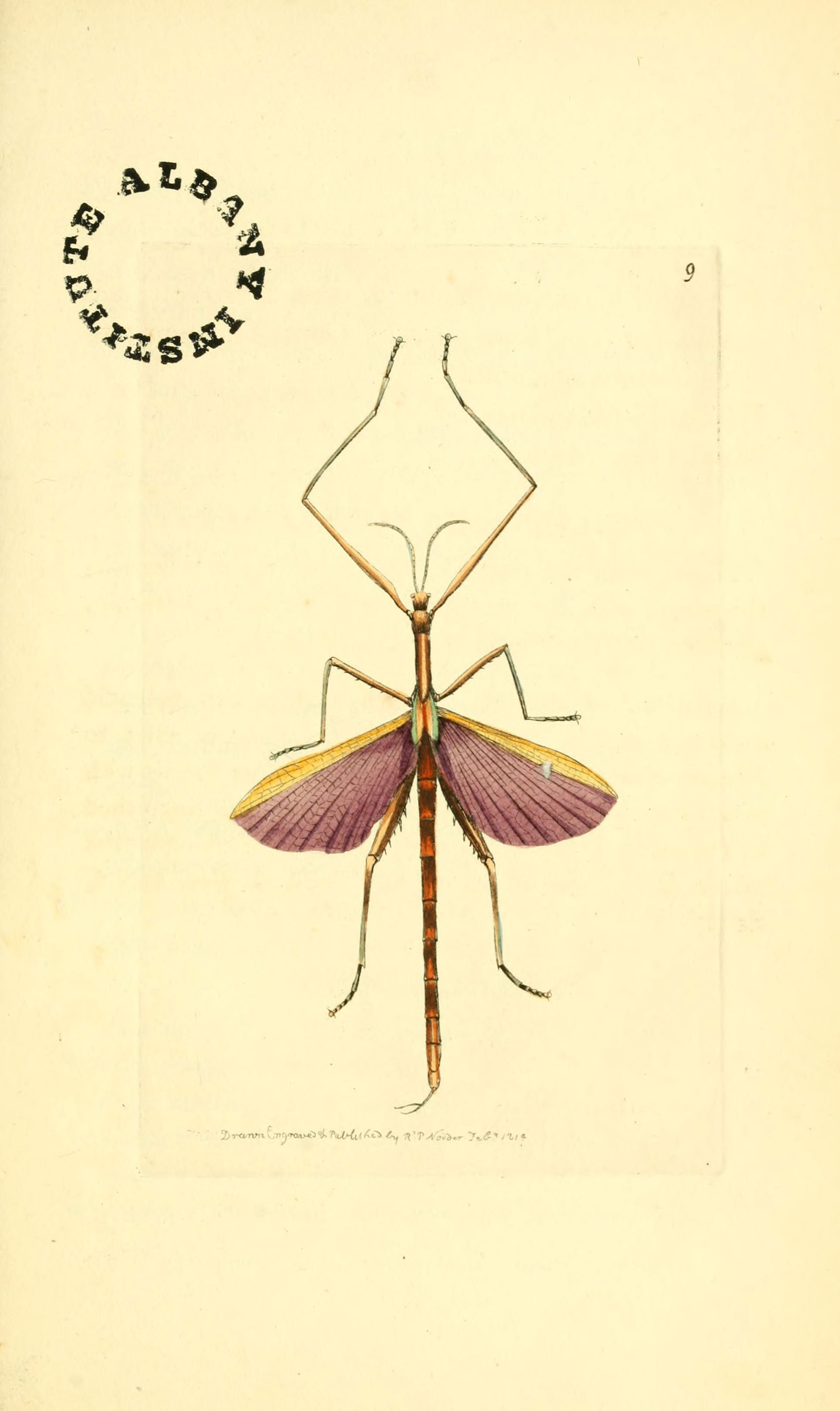
- The zoological miscellany (6127017861)

Scientific classification
- Domain: Eukaryota
- Kingdom: Animalia
- Phylum: Arthropoda
- Class: Insecta
- Order: Phasmatodea
- Family: Phasmatidae
- Subfamily: Tropidoderinae
- Tribe: Tropidoderini
- Genus: Didymuria; Kirby, 1904

= Didymuria =

Genus of insects

Didymuria is a genus of phasmids belonging to the family Phasmatidae.

The species of this genus are found in Australia & New Guinea.

Species:

- Didymuria schultzei (Giglio-Tos, 1912)
- Didymuria violescens (Leach, 1814)
- Didymuria virginea (Stål, 1875)
