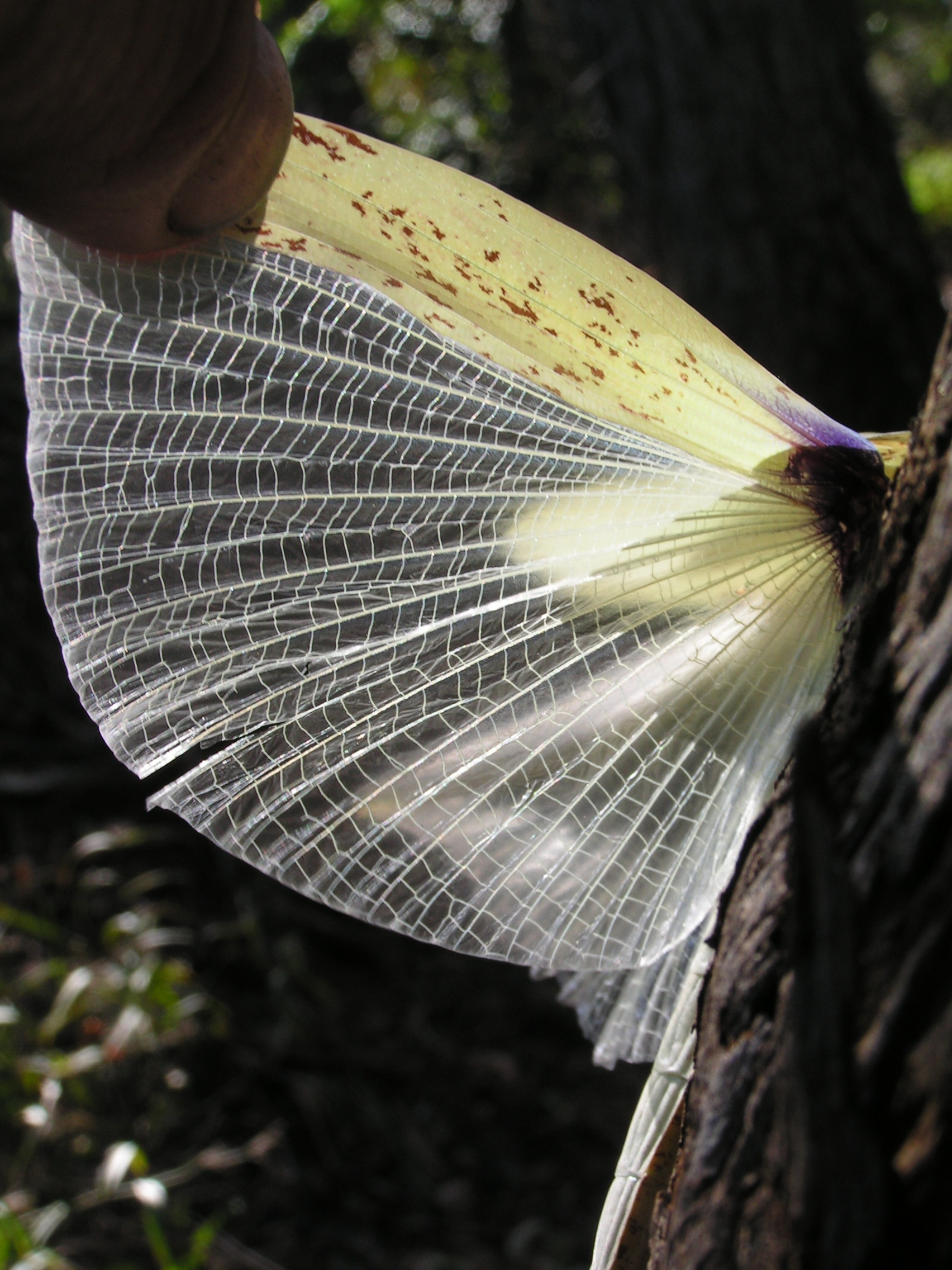
- Tropidoderus childrenii

Scientific classification
- Domain: Eukaryota
- Kingdom: Animalia
- Phylum: Arthropoda
- Class: Insecta
- Order: Phasmatodea
- Family: Phasmatidae
- Subfamily: Tropidoderinae
- Tribe: Tropidoderini
- Genus: Tropidoderus; Gray, 1835

= Tropidoderus =

Genus of insects

Tropidoderus is a genus of phasmids belonging to the family Phasmatidae.

The species of this genus are found in Australia.

Species:

- Tropidoderus childrenii (G.R.Gray, 1833)
- Tropidoderus exiguus Redtenbacher, 1908
- Tropidoderus gracilifemur (Sjöstedt, 1918)
- Tropidoderus michaelseni Werner, 1912
- Tropidoderus prasina (Sjöstedt, 1918)
- Tropidoderus rhodomus McCoy, 1882
- Tropidoderus viridis Montrouzier, 1855
