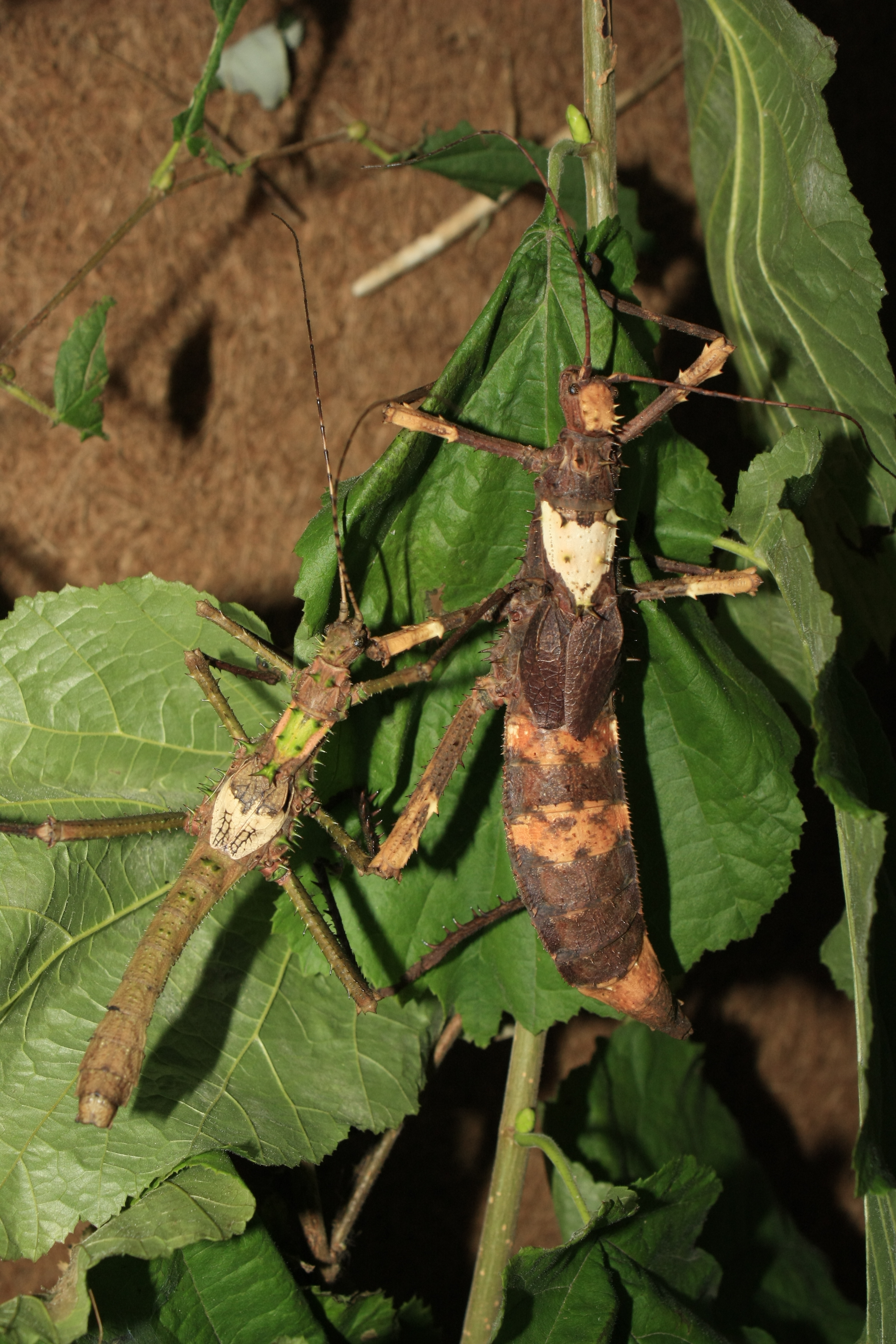
- Pair of Haaniella grayii

Scientific classification
- Kingdom: Animalia
- Phylum: Arthropoda
- Class: Insecta
- Order: Phasmatodea
- Family: Heteropterygidae
- Subfamily: Heteropteryginae
- Tribe: Heteropterygini
- Genus: Haaniella
- Species: H. grayii

Binomial name
- Haaniella grayii (Westwood, 1859)

Synonyms
- Heteropteryx grayii Westwood, 1859; Heteropteryx australe Kirby, 1896

= Haaniella grayii =

Species of stick insect

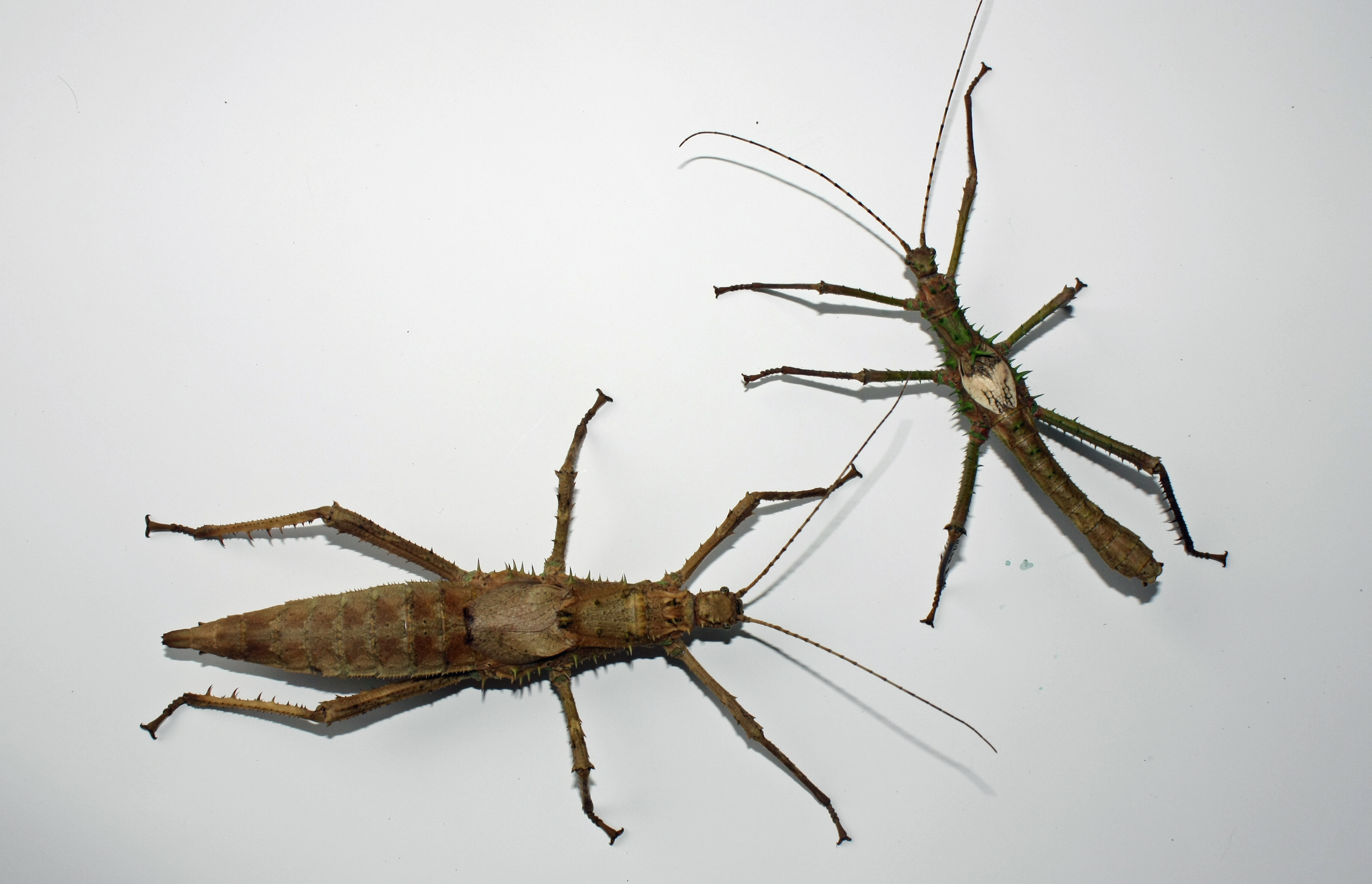
Pair – left females, right male

Haaniella grayii is a stick insect species native to Borneo. It is a typical representative of the subfamily Heteropteryginae and the largest species of the genus Haaniella. The occasionally used common name Gray's Haaniella refers to the species name.

== Description ==
Haaniella grayii has the genus-typical sharp spines distributed over the body and legs in both sexes. Also typical of the genus are the strongly shortened forewings, developed as tegmina, which completely cover the short hindwings, which have been transformed into stridulation organs. The slimmer males, which have much more spines on their backs and are more colorful, remain smaller at 78 to 95 millimetres (3.1 to 3.7 in) than the females, which are 102 to 143 millimetres (4.0 to 5.6 in) long. In addition to almost monochromatic beige-brown, more rarely brown to black-brown females, there are also specimens with high-contrast light and dark brown patterns, which can have light, almost white patterns on the mesonotum, the front wings and the abdomen. They usually get a little darker with age. In adult females, the abdomen swells significantly due to egg production. The spine shaped ovipositor is formed dorsally by the supraanal plate, which corresponds to the eleventh tergum. In Haaniella grayii, it is characterized by six more or less distinct teeth. Unlike the other Haaniella species native to Borneo, it is longer than the lower part of the ovipositor, which is called the subgenital plate and consists of the eighth sternite. The synovial membranes, especially in the area of the hind and middle coxae, are pale green in females and bright green in males. In the latter they stand in addition to other green areas in the ventral head and the meso- and metasternum in contrast to the red-brown colored sternite edges and the coxae themselves. The bright green coloring of the spines is also typical of the males. Often the folded forewings are dark brown in front and white with brown veins behind. The arrangement of the spines on the mesonotum of the males is particularly species-specific. Between the formation of four spines in front of the base of the forewings found in many species and the pair of long spines in the front part of the mesontum, there is another pair of long spines in Haaniella grayii.

== Distribution, way of life and reproduction ==
The distribution area of Haaniella grayii overlaps almost completely with that of Haaniella saussurei in the west of Borneo. Both species are found in the south-west of the Malaysian state of Sarawak, where H. grayii has been found on Mount Serapi to an altitude of 300 metres (980 ft). In addition, unlike H. saussurei, the species can also be found in central areas of Kalimantan.

The defensive behavior typical of the subfamily, consisting of spreading the held up, spiked hind legs and closing them when touched by an attacker, can also be observed in H. grayii. The hairy eggs have a diagonally cruciform micropylar plate with the micropyle in the lower angle. The female lays them in the ground at night. While the eggs of the Sarawak-derived specimens are about 9.2 millimetres (0.36 in) long, 7 millimetres (0.28 in) high and about 6 millimetres (0.24 in) wide, those of the Kalimantan-derived animals are hardly hairy and averaging 8.3 millimetres (0.33 in) in length, 6.5 millimetres (0.26 in) in height and 5.7 millimetres (0.22 in) width also slightly smaller. The nymphs hatch after 9 to 18 months and are then already 35 millimetres (1.4 in) long. They are adult after about nine months and two months later the females start laying eggs.

== Taxonomy ==
John O. Westwood described the species in 1859 as Heteropteryx grayii and illustrated it with a depiction of a male. The specific name is dedicated to George Robert Gray. Until the description of Haaniella saussurei in 1904, the specimens referred to as H. grayii always included representatives of H. saussurei. This also applies to the five type specimens that are deposited in the Oxford University Museum of Natural History and in the Natural History Museum and are also referred to as "Westwood's types". Of the four specimens deposited at Oxford, only the female lectotype is actually a representative of H. grayii, while the female and two male paralectotypes are H. saussurei. The male from the London Natural History Museum, which also belongs to this series, shows the spines typical of H. grayii and otherwise corresponds to Westwood's illustration contained in the description. William Forsell Kirby established the genus Haaniella in 1904, in which he also transferred Haaniella grayii along with some other species. In addition, he recognized on the basis of some specimens investigated by Henri de Saussure in 1896 that these were not H. grayi, but that these specimens represent a separate species. He described the same in honor of Saussure under the name Haaniella saussurei.

As early as 1896, Kirby described specimens allegedly originating from Australia as Heteropteryx australe. This was recognized in 1944 by Klaus Günther as synonym to Haaniella grayii, whereby the locality is also doubted. Their male lectotype and female paralectotype are also deposited in the Natural History Museum in London.

Sporadically, representatives of the subfamily Heteropteryginae can be found, whose spines are different and which also lack individual spines. Philip Edward Bragg found an adult male in Sarawak, which shows the spine arrangement of Haaniella echinata on the pro- and mesonotum, while it shows the spines of H. grayii on the abdomen. This specimens could be a hybrid of both species. It is deposited in Natural History Museum in London. Since the ranges of both species do not overlap, Bragg assumes that they meet at least at their borders. Some authors see the possible hybridization as an indication that these are not two independent species.

== In terraristics ==
In terrariums Haaniella grayii was first introduced in 1990 by Bragg and Paul Jennings. Further imports were made in 1990 by Bragg and Ian Abercrombie, and in 1996 by Frank H. Hennemann and Oskar V. Conle. The animals were each found on Mount Serapi in north-west Sarawak. The species is listed under PSG number 125 by the Phasmid Study Group. Medium-sized to large terrariums with suitable hiding places are required to keep Haaniella grayii. For laying eggs, the floor of the terrarium should be covered with an 8 to 10 centimetres (3.1 to 3.9 in) thick layer of a suitable, always slightly moist substrate. In addition, high humidity and daytime temperatures of well over 20 °C (68 °F) are necessary for successful keeping. Diet is not a problem, because they eat leaves of bramble, elderberry, ivy, oak, hawthorn and firethorn, eucalyptus, salal and other plants.

== Gallery ==
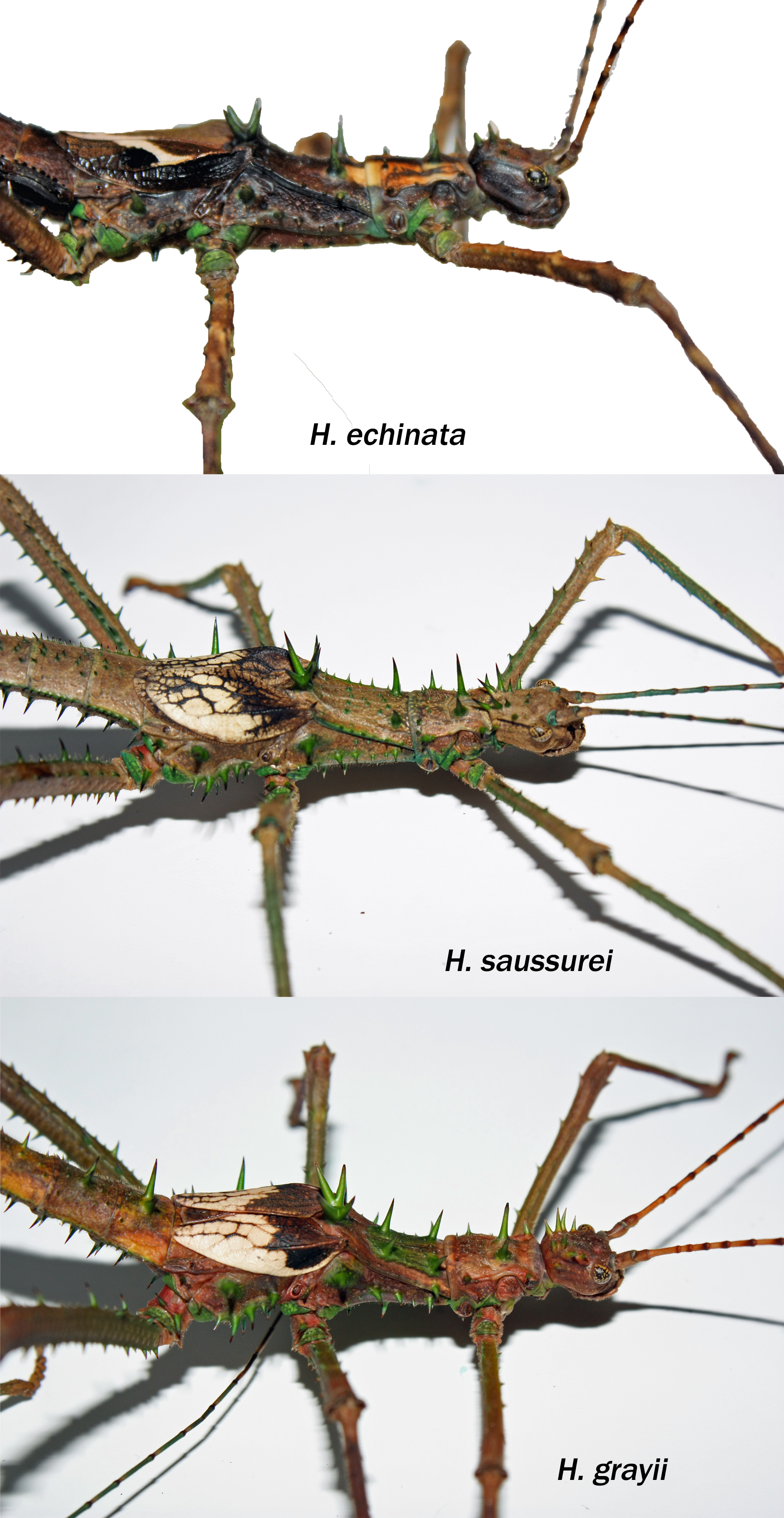
arrangement of the thoracic spines of a male compared to males of H. echinata und H. saussurei

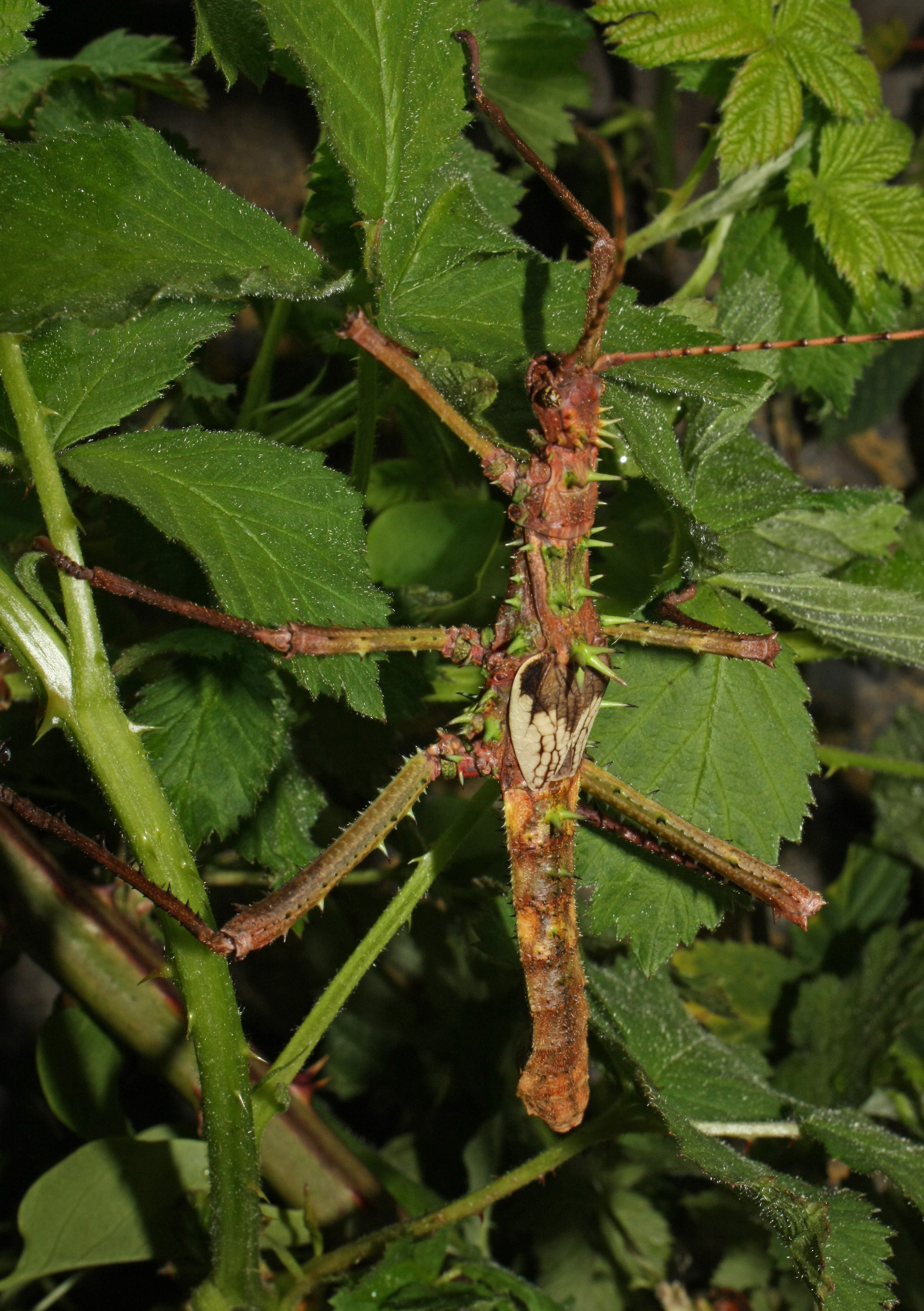
male

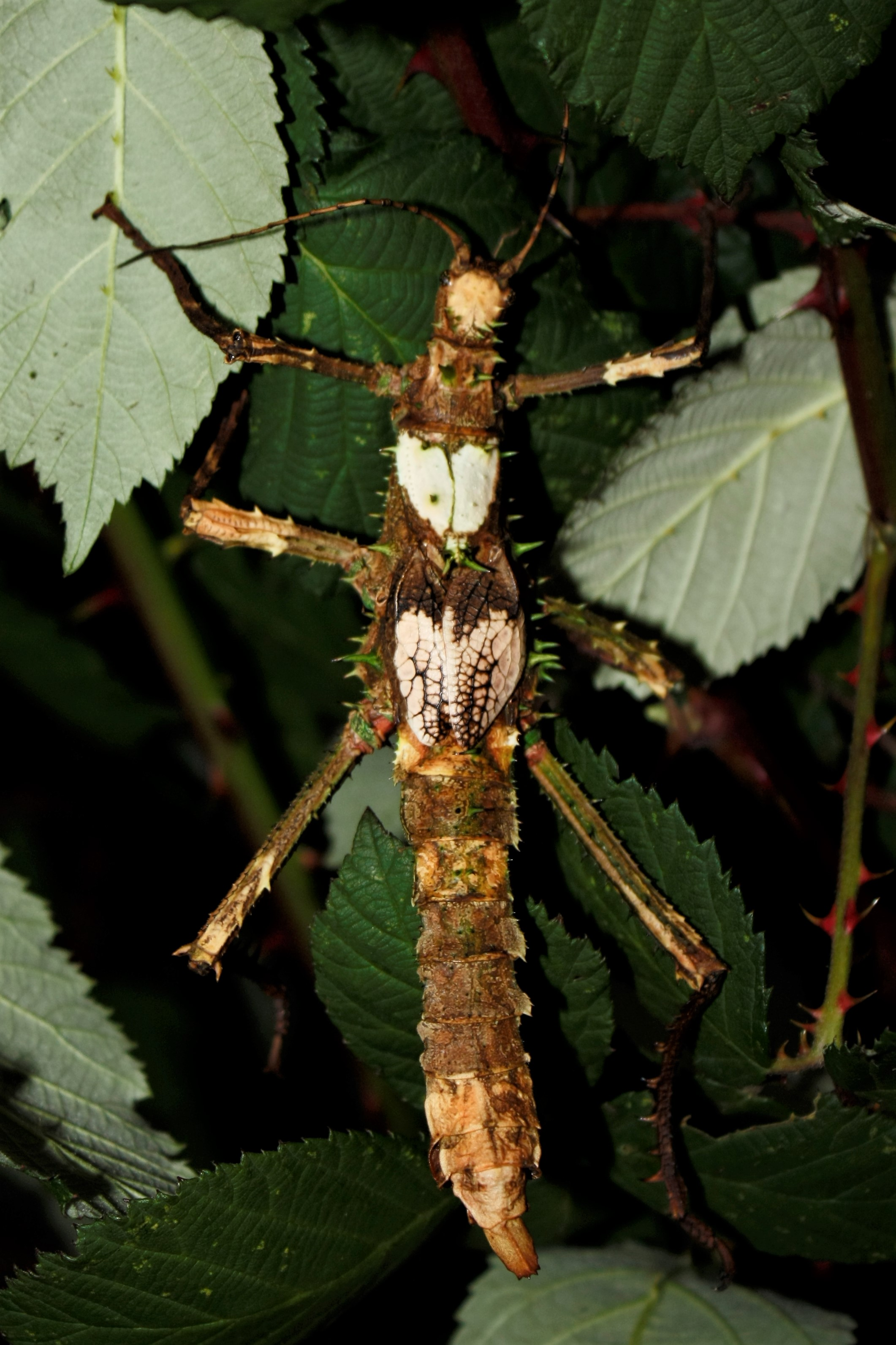
gynandromorph

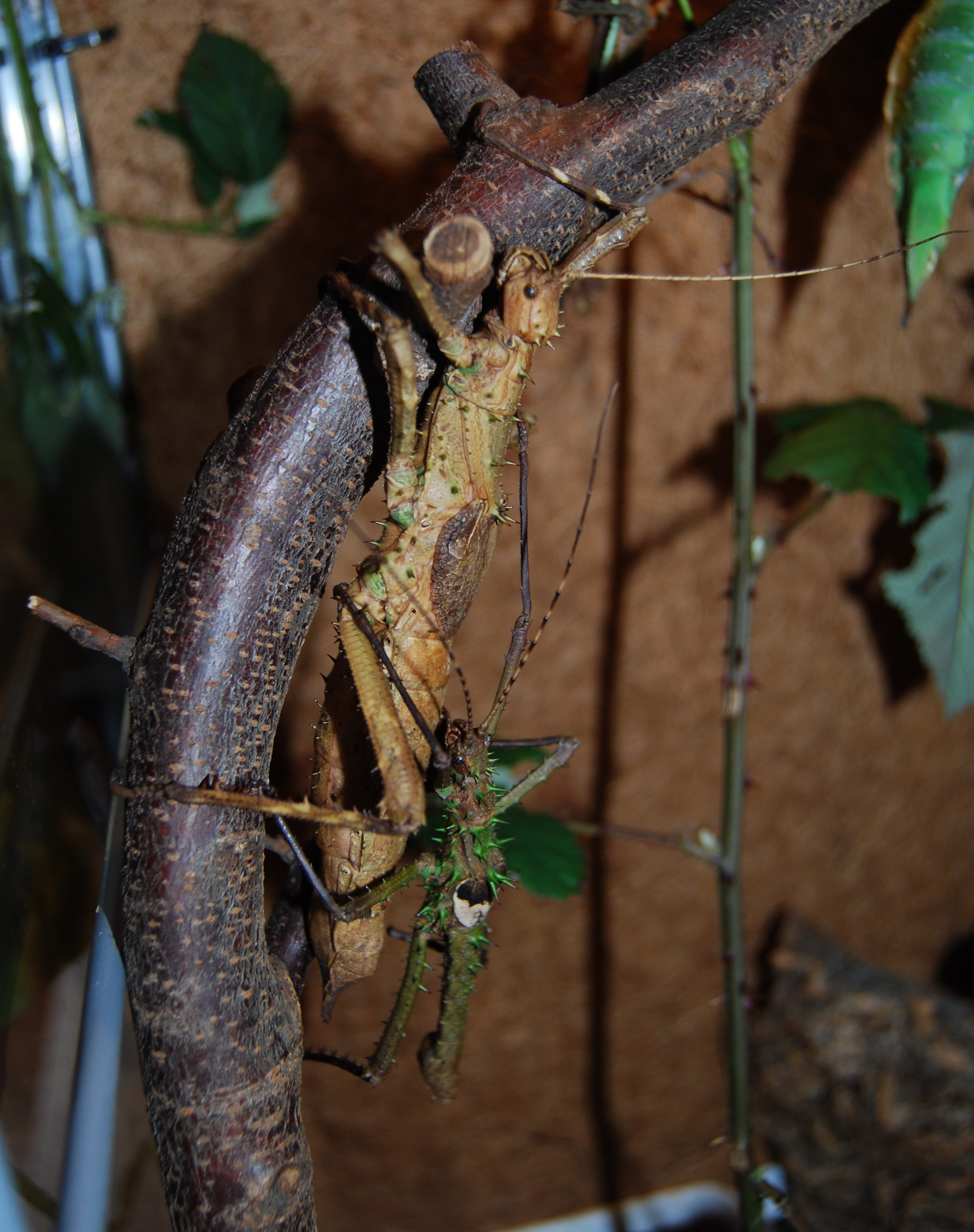
pair

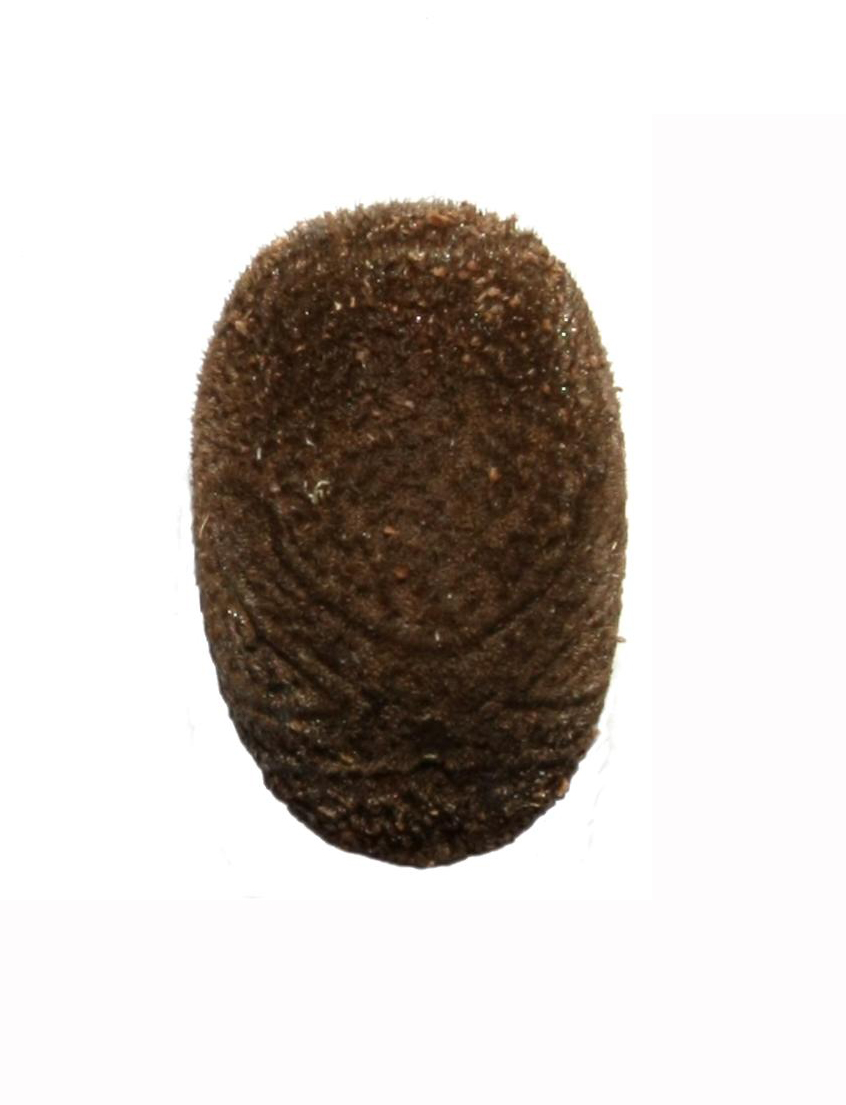
egg

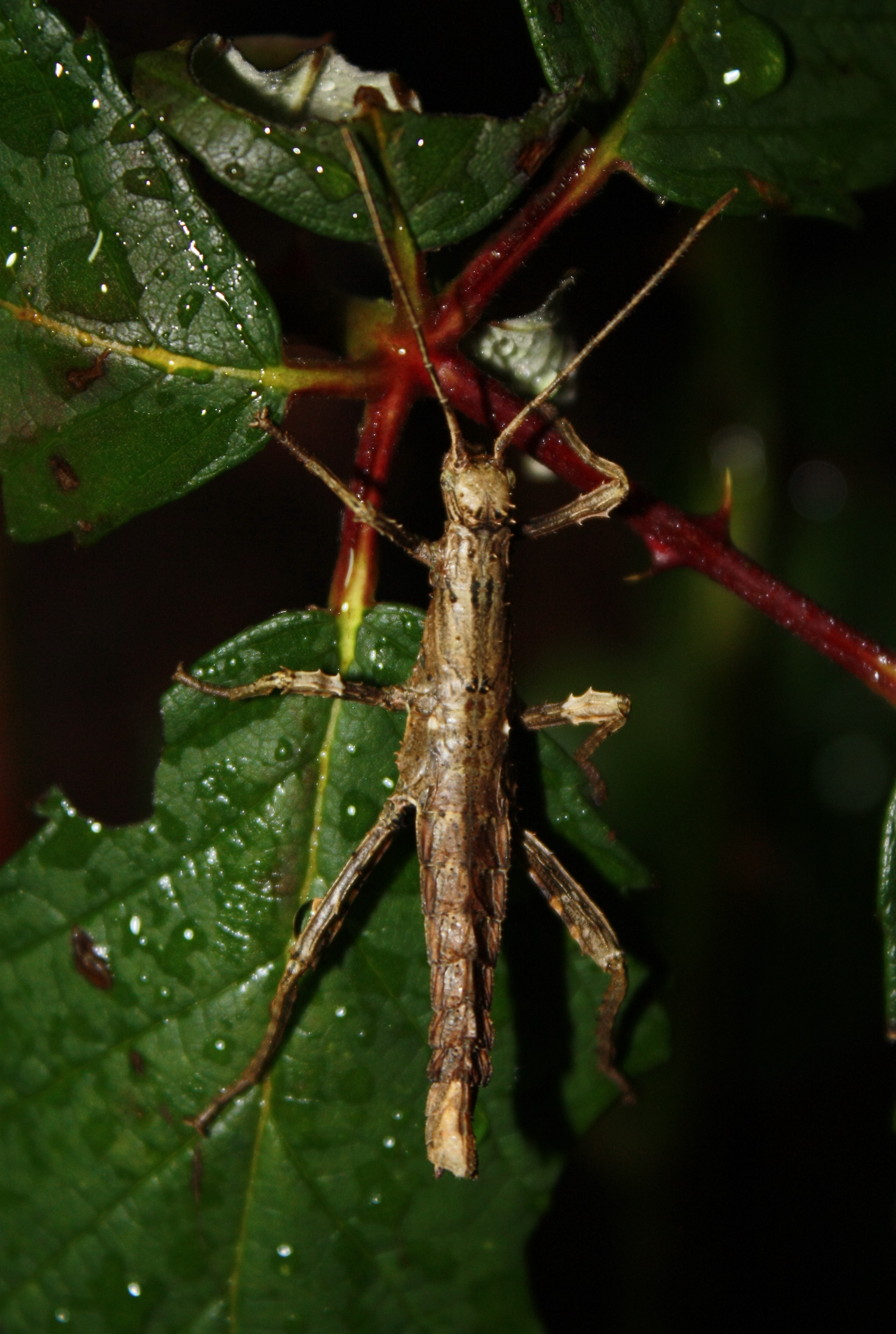
even hatched larva nymph
