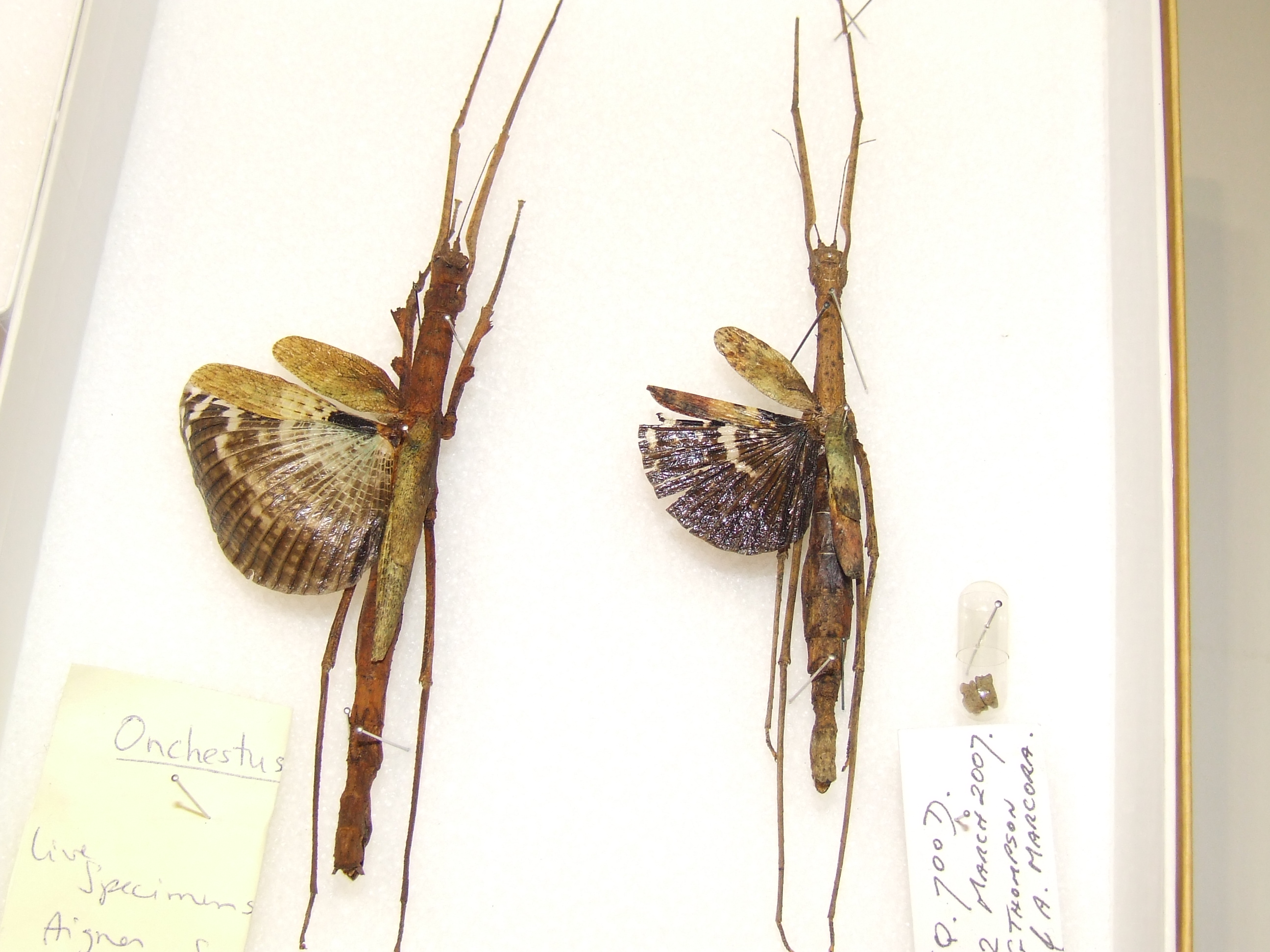
- Onchestus rentzi females

Scientific classification
- Kingdom: Animalia
- Phylum: Arthropoda
- Clade: Pancrustacea
- Class: Insecta
- Order: Phasmatodea
- Family: Phasmatidae
- Genus: Onchestus
- Species: O. rentzi

Binomial name
- Onchestus rentzi Brock & Hasenpusch, 2006

= Onchestus rentzi =

Species of stick insect

Onchestus rentzi is an Australian species of stick insect, commonly named the crowned stick insect, described in 2006. It lives in rainforests along the coast of Queensland and the Northern Territory. It is named after the Australian orthopterist David Rentz.

== Identification ==
Crowned stick insects are dark black-grey and use camouflage to blend in with the surroundings. Adults can reach lengths of 120mm and have a protuberance of the cuticle of the head which resembles a crown in both sexes. The wings of this species are a deep purple in colour.

== Gallery ==
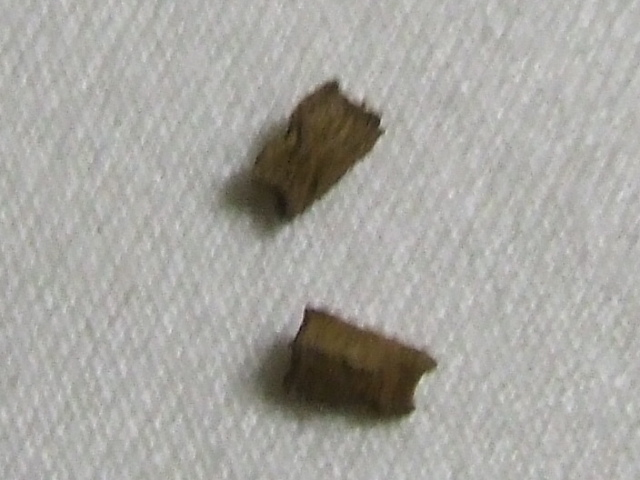
2 eggs from Onchestus rentzi

== See also ==
- List of Australian stick insects and mantids
