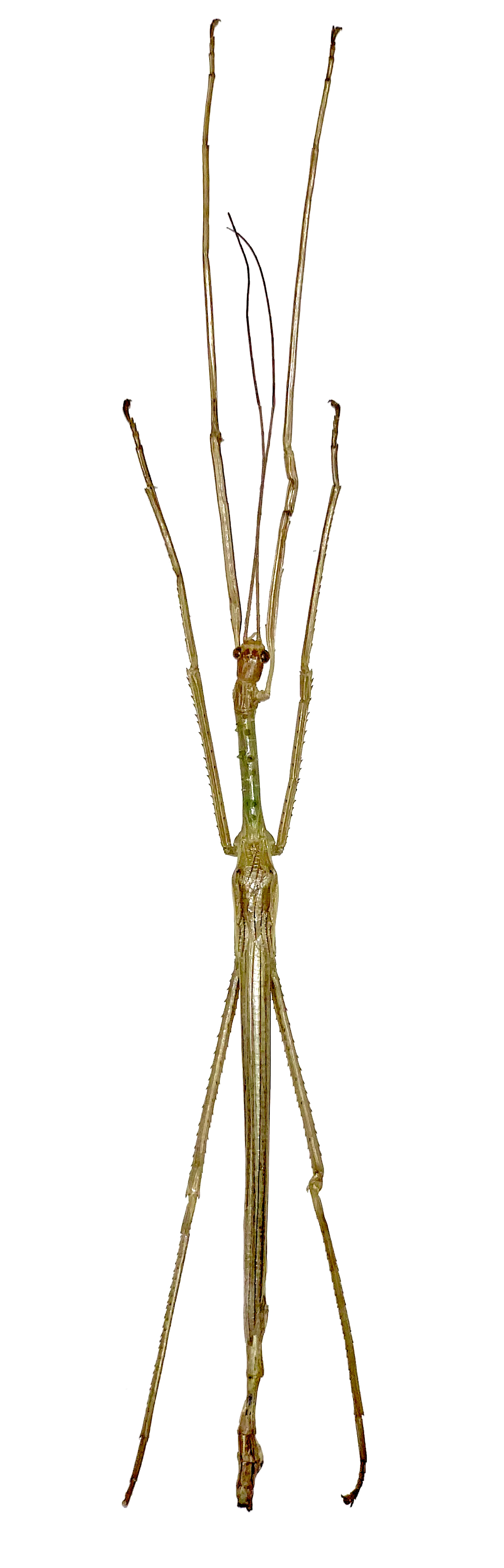
- Acrophylla wuelfingi male specimen

Scientific classification
- Kingdom: Animalia
- Phylum: Arthropoda
- Class: Insecta
- Order: Phasmatodea
- Family: Phasmatidae
- Tribe: Phasmatini
- Genus: Acrophylla; Gray, 1835

Synonyms
- Vetilia Redtenbacher, 1908

= Acrophylla =

Genus of stick insects

Acrophylla is a genus of stick insects in the tribe Phasmatini, erected by George Robert Gray in 1835. Species are found in Sichuan, Australia, New Guinea and surrounding islands such as Tasmania and Larat.

== Species ==
The Phasmida Species File includes:

1. Acrophylla alta Coupland & Emmott, 2025
2. Acrophylla bhaskarai Conle & Hennemann, 2018
3. Acrophylla cookorum Brock & Coupland, 2022
4. Acrophylla enceladus Gray, 1835
5. Acrophylla maindroni (Redtenbacher, 1908)
6. Acrophylla nubilosa Tepper, 1905
7. Acrophylla sichuanensis Chen & He, 2001
8. Acrophylla thoon (Stål, 1877)
9. Acrophylla titan (MacLeay, 1826) - type species (as Phasma titan Macleay)
10. Acrophylla wuelfingi (Redtenbacher, 1908)
