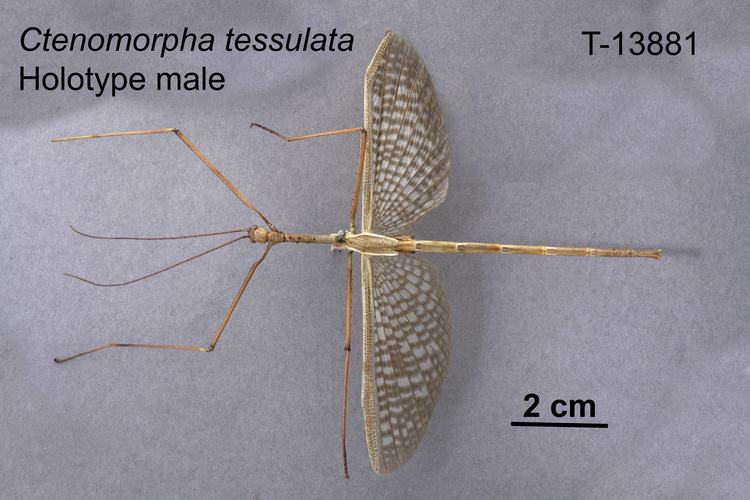
- Male A. austrotessulata

Scientific classification
- Kingdom: Animalia
- Phylum: Arthropoda
- Clade: Pancrustacea
- Class: Insecta
- Order: Phasmatodea
- Family: Phasmatidae
- Subfamily: Phasmatinae
- Tribe: Phasmatini
- Genus: Anchiale
- Species: A. austrotessulata

Binomial name
- Anchiale austrotessulata Brock & Hasenpusch, 2007

Synonyms
- Ctenomorphodes tessulatus Gray, 1835

= Anchiale austrotessulata =

Species of insect

Anchiale austrotessulata (synonyms include Ctenomorphodes tessulatus), the tessellated stick insect, tessellated phasmid or tessulata stick insect, is a medium-sized, stick insect found in the Brisbane area of Australia. Fully grown males in mating season exhibit frenetic behaviour. This species is also parthenogenetic.

The species was first described in 1835 by George Robert Gray as Ctenomorphodes tessulata (later corrected to tessulatus).

== Description ==
Tessellated stick insects are brown grey. Females are about 150 mm (5.9 in) long and males are about 120 mm (4.7 in) long. The name comes from the black and white tessellations in the wings. Females are short winged and flightless, whilst the long-winged males are capable of flight. Eggs are tiny (3 millimetres [0.12 in]), shiny black with a white capitulum.

== Behaviour ==
Females, like many phasmids in Australia, flick their eggs to the ground in order to attract ants to take them to the ant refinery where they hatch over seasons.

== Rearing in captivity ==
Nymphs will hatch if they are in crevices in rock and will not hatch in dry conditions, whilst on sand the eggs will hatch as well. Nymphs when hatching in crevices can use the rock, bark etc. for helping hand to get out of the egg, also while on sand the nymphs can use the sand to emerge without having the egg still attached to rear legs. Cold conditions will hatch the eggs if they were in a non-dry environment, in a crevice, and on sand. Ctenomorphodes tessulatus eggs will not hatch in dry conditions. The presence of sand or litter helps the young phasmatid to completely free its metathoracic legs - if the eggs are placed loosely on the surface the nymph frequently cannot accomplish this and usually dies still attached to the shell.

Females are parthenogenetic so a single egg can start a population, all eggs produced this way will be females. Whilst reaching adulthood the tesselated phasmid needs to keep feeding in order to grow, which can cause significant defoliation. Rearing the nymphs is quick and easy, low maintenance cleaning and when adult, mating is easy and simple.

== See also ==
- List of stick insects and mantids of Australia
