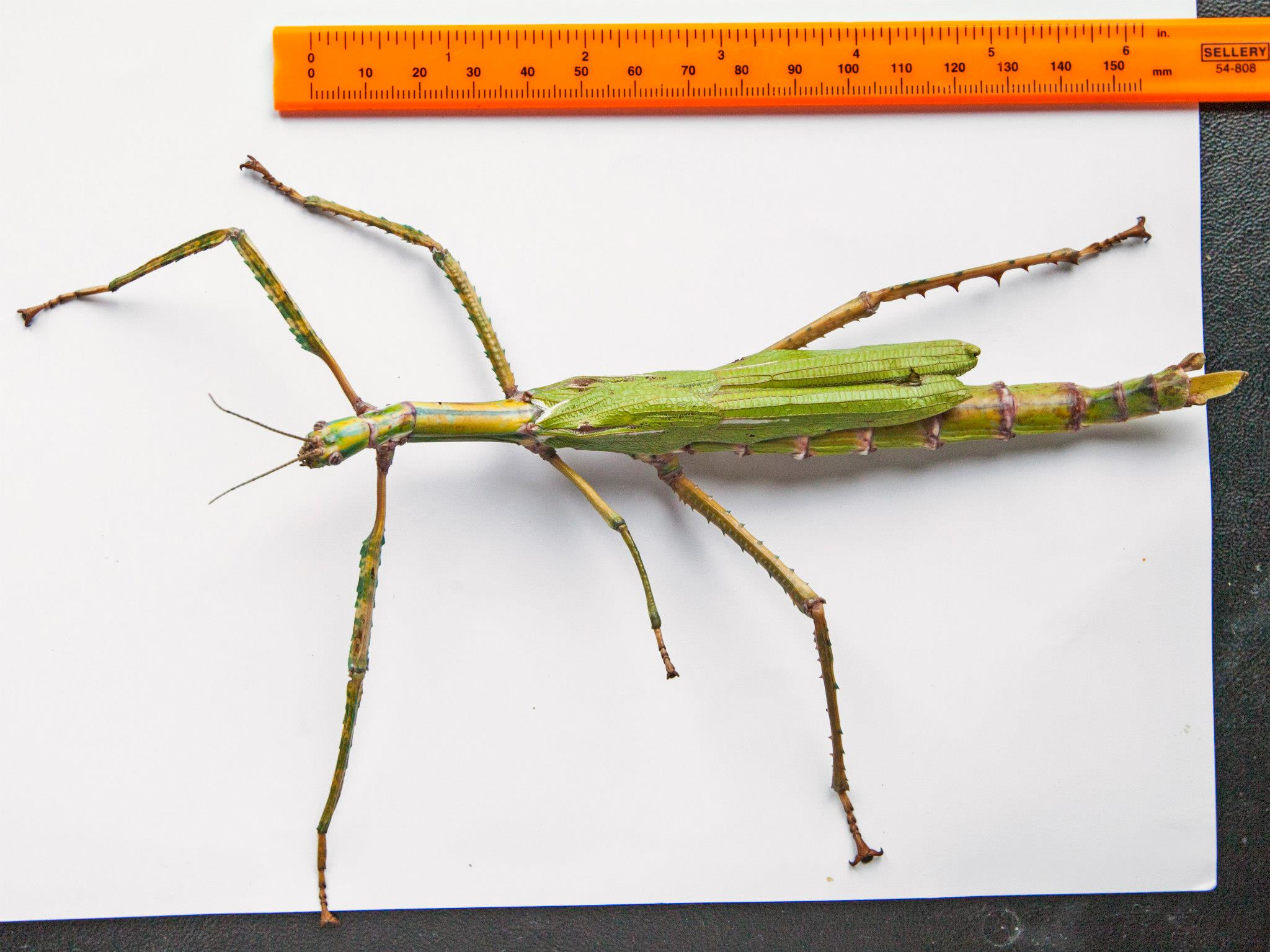
- Adult female E. goliath

Conservation status
- Least Concern (IUCN 3.1)

Scientific classification
- Kingdom: Animalia
- Phylum: Arthropoda
- Clade: Pancrustacea
- Class: Insecta
- Order: Phasmatodea
- Family: Phasmatidae
- Subfamily: Phasmatinae
- Tribe: Phasmatini
- Genus: Eurycnema
- Species: E. goliath

Binomial name
- Eurycnema goliath (Gray, 1834)

Synonyms
- Phasma (Diura) acheron Gray, 1834; Acrophylla goliath Gray, 1835; Clemacantha regale Rainbow, 1897; Cyphocrana goliath (Gray); Brullé, 1835; Cyphocrania goliath (Gray); de Haan, 1842; Cyphocrania herculeana Charpentier, 1841; Diura goliath Gray, 1834; Diura magnifica (Kirby); Günther, 1929; Eurycnema goliath (Gray); Kirby, 1904; Eurycnema magnifica Kirby, 1904; Eurycnema viridissima Kirby, 1904a

= Eurycnema goliath =

Goliath stick insect

Species of stick insect

Eurycnema goliath, commonly known as the goliath stick insect, or the regal stick insect, is a large species of stick insect in the family Phasmatidae, endemic to Australia and considered one of the largest species of stick insects in the country. The species has the Phasmid Study Group number PSG14.

== Taxonomy ==
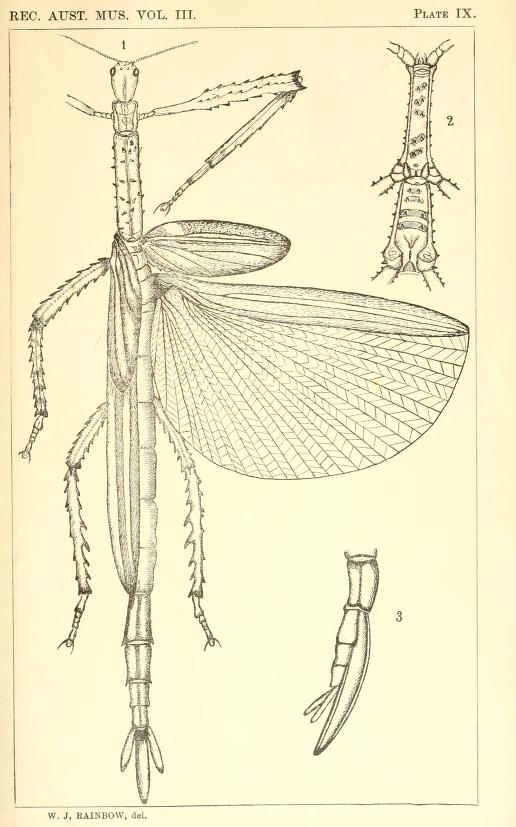
Drawing of a male Eurycnema goliath from the Australian Museum in 1900 by English entomologist William Joseph Rainbow.

E. goliath was first described by English zoologist George Robert Gray in 1834, using two female specimens, one of which came from the collection belonging to British entomologist John Curtis at the Museum of Victoria. The species is named after the biblical giant Goliath from the popular story of David vs Goliath in the Book of Samuel, and refers to the impressive size of the insect.

Gray originally placed the species in the genus Phasma. In 1835, Gray then transferred the insect to the genus Acrophylla. 7 years later in 1842, Dutch zoologist Wilhelm de Haan transferred the goliath to the genus Cyphrocrania. The insect was placed into its present genus Eurycnema by English entomologist William Forsell Kirby in 1904.

Within literature surrounding the Eurycnema goliath, the species has often been confused with the Eurycnema osiris due to the visual similarity between the insects. Key distinguishing features between the two species include differences in spines on the hind legs, forewing length and antennal segments. As a result of this confusion in identification and classification of Australian stick insects, various synonyms have appeared in literature relating to Eurycnema goliath.

== Description ==
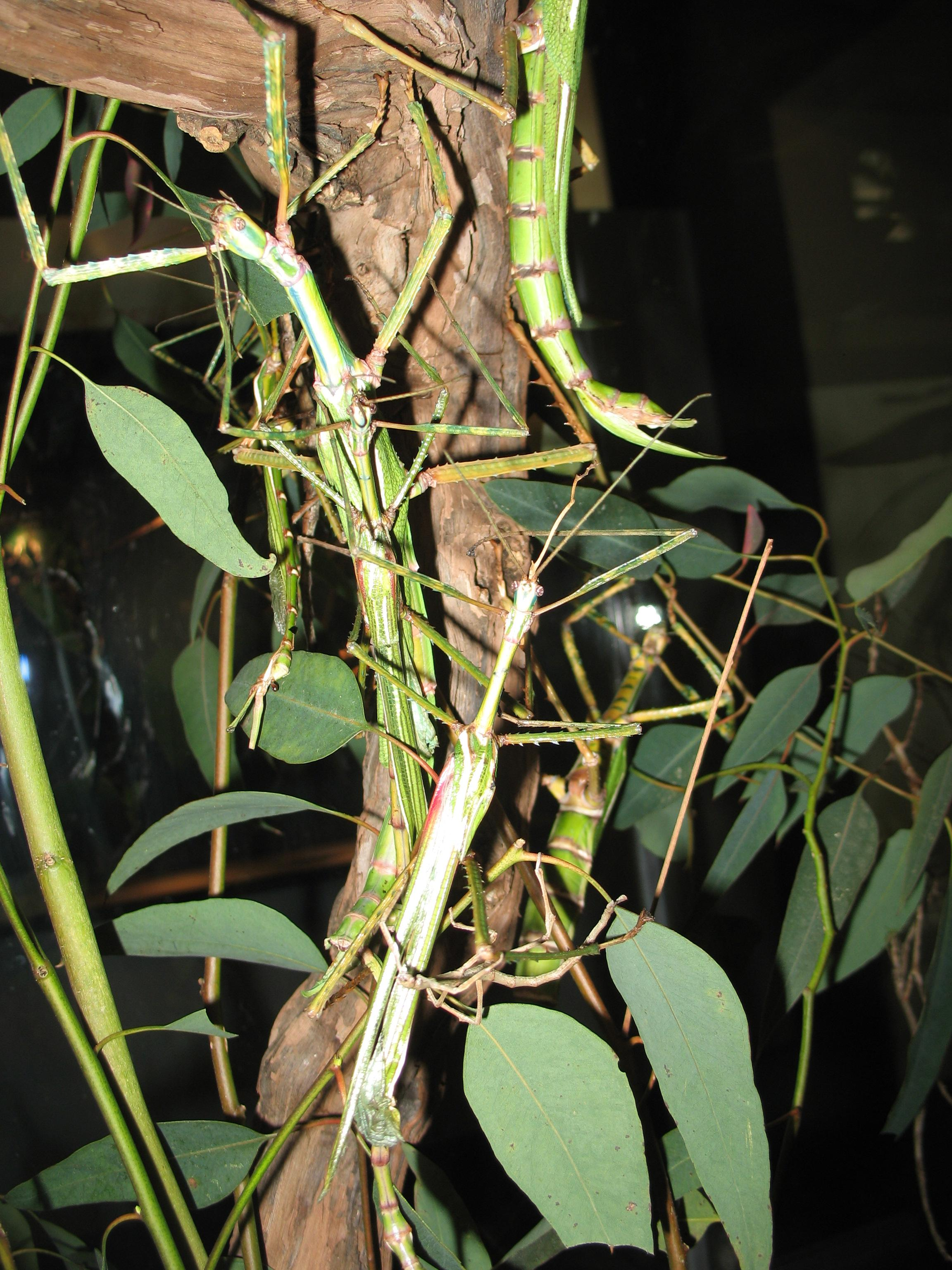
Captive insects: the male abdomen top left shows the characteristically large cerci, in front (centre) is a female showing the longitudinal green bands towards the head.

With an adult body length of 105–146 mm in males, and 155–204 mm in females, Eurycnema goliath is one of the largest species of Phasmida in Australia. General body coloration is apple-green, with yellow banding across the upper body. The mesonotum is smooth and glossy in appearance, it is also three to four times shorter than the pronotum. The mesonotum also has a bluish-green longitudinal median line running down its entire length Tubercles and spines are present on both dorsal and ventral sides of the body, usually accompanied by bluish green colouration. The abdomen is thick and flexible, with the final three segments much shorter than the previous six segments. The operculum structure of females is distinct, extending well beyond the abdomen and tapering to a tip; this forms the 'chute' used for flicking both eggs and frass. Cerci, the paired appendages on the rear of the insect's abdomen, are particularly long: especially in males of E. goliath. Females have simple ovaries with approximately 200 ovarioles in total

The phasmid has a large head coloured yellow with three longitudinal green bands running from the eyes to the back of the head. Three glossy ocelli are on the top of the head in a triangular formation, sitting between two brown compound eyes. Antennae are short (32 mm) with 29 segments in females, while being much longer in males (57 mm), with 27 segments.

The legs of E. goliath are long and slender, with a mottled yellow and green colouration. All legs are lined with serrate spines, with the largest spines occurring on the inside of the hind tibia. In males, these spines are more pronounced, with enlarged spines on both the mid and hind-tibia. E. goliath, like many phasmids, has adhesive pad structures on its legs which allow it to stick to surfaces, enabling ease of movement throughout the trees it inhabits.

Wings of E. goliath are large and run down the majority of the abdomen, two distinct white bands run continuously down the forewing and hindwings. Forewings are the same apple-green as the body, with a vibrant red ventral surface in females. Hindwings are transparent and green veined. Despite being fully winged, females are incapable of flight, this is likely due to their size and weight. Males have larger wings and are significantly smaller than females, enabling strong flight.

== Life cycle ==
Goliath stick insects are hemimetabolous, going through an incomplete metamorphosis with egg, nymph and adult life stages.

The species is parthenogenetic, where females can lay viable eggs without the requirement for male fertilisation, despite this, fertilised reproduction will still occur. E. goliath become sexually mature following their final moult, where they can consistently reproduce throughout the rest of their adult lives. Reproduction can occur throughout the entire year in optimal conditions. In the wild, females lay eggs from summer through to autumn, with eggs hatching in a period of 11–24 months. The body of female goliath stick insects becomes very large during the egg-laying period. When eggs are laid, the female will 'flick' the egg outwards to the ground using her abdomen, this aids in egg dispersal. Egg production may vary based on seasonal conditions and food abundance, with females recorded laying 200–800 eggs.

Eggs are large, dark brown and oval shaped, with a thick bark-like ridged exterior. Eggs resemble plant seeds such as those from Banksia species.

The egg also contains a large yellow capitulum, an edible fleshy structure similar to that of elaiosomes in plant seeds, that serves the purpose of attracting ants to collect and disperse eggs. The fatty acid composition of this capitulum is key to attracting ant species to locate and carry the egg, with a reduction in dispersal rates seen when the capitula is removed. Ants will often bring the egg underground into nests, which protects the egg from the environment and predation. Although numerous species of ants are expected to carry and disperse the eggs, only Rhytidoponera metallica, an ant common within the distribution of the E. goliath, has been recorded undertaking the behaviour.

There are five instar stages prior to becoming an adult, with moulting occurring between each stage. Nymphs usually hatch during the night and can be active immediately, where they will instinctually climb nearby trees just after hatching. The first instar of the E. goliath is dark brown with a very slender body and legs, cerci are prominent and antennae are very short. Following the first moult, the insect will increase in size but no other physical changes are apparent. After the second moult, along with a further increase in size, the nymph will change in colour from the dark brown to a mottled greyish brown colour. This colouration will consist of less brown and more grey in successive moults. Following the third moult, along with changes in size and colour, sexual dimorphism between nymphs becomes visible; this involves both the development of male genitalia as well differences in body dimensions, with larger bodied females, and longer antennae in males. After the fourth moult, there is a further increase in size and spine development on the legs increases. In the fifth and final nymphal moult there is no increase in the body size of the nymph, yet wings will grow considerably during this period. The final moult to become an adult E. goliath takes over an hour, with the development of their distinct bright apple-green colouration and wings unfolding to reach their full size.

== Distribution and habitat ==
The goliath stick insect is widespread throughout Australia's east coast in New South Wales and southern Queensland. Small populations have also been reported in northern Queensland and Tasmania. They can be encountered within bushland, rainforests and in green spaces such as parks and gardens.

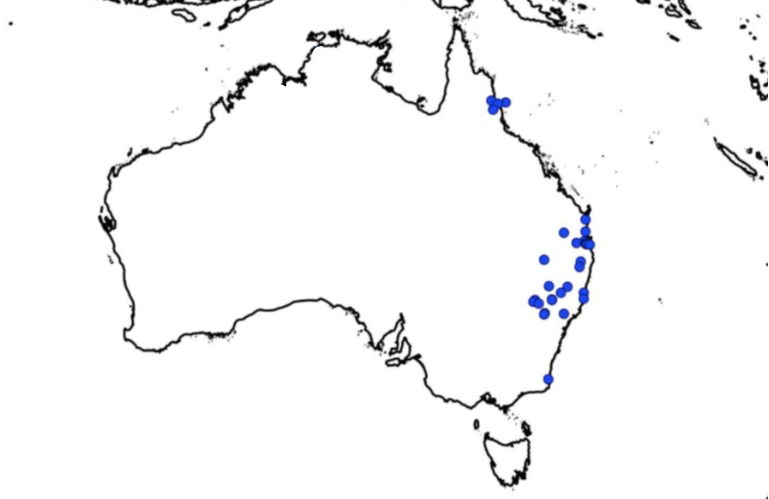
Reported occurrences of Eurycnema goliath according to the Atlas of Living Australia

The insect also has a preference for inhabiting Eucalyptus and broad-leafed Acacia tree species, its primary food plants. E. goliath travels very little, and will spend a large portion, if not all of their life inhabiting a singular tree. The species favors Eucalyptus and Acacia trees as primary hosts, which offer both structural support and nutritional resources essential for its survival.

The number of mature individuals present in the wild, and the population trend is unknown. Despite this, Eurycnema goliath is considered common across its distribution range, and was classified as 'least concern' in the IUCN red list, following a 2016 species assessment.

== Threats ==
Threats facing Eurycnema goliath are primarily in the form of habitat loss, due to the reliance of the insect on eucalyptus and acacia species for both a food source, and for protection from predators.

=== Bushfires ===
Over E. goliath's distribution range, especially in southeastern Australia, large bushfires are extremely frequent. Bushfires in this region causes considerable habitat loss, killing individual insects and potentially leading to ecosystem conversion. The increasing frequency and intensity of bushfires due to climate change further increases the direct impact of these events on the insect, and increases the period needed for habitat recovery. These factors bushfire event are the largest threats to Eurycnema goliath populations. Despite the magnitude of this threat, due to the wide distribution range of the E. goliath, the likelihood of bushfires threatening the overall survival of the species is low.

== Behaviour ==
=== Anti-predator adaptations ===
==== Camouflage ====
In a form of passive camouflage and plant mimicry, the goliath stick insect has evolved to resemble the leaf, or branch of a tree with its coloration and shape. This is accompanied by a swaying body movement from side to side that is thought to mimic the swaying of leaves and branches. This adaptation assists the goliath stick insect in avoiding detection by predators.

==== Startle display ====
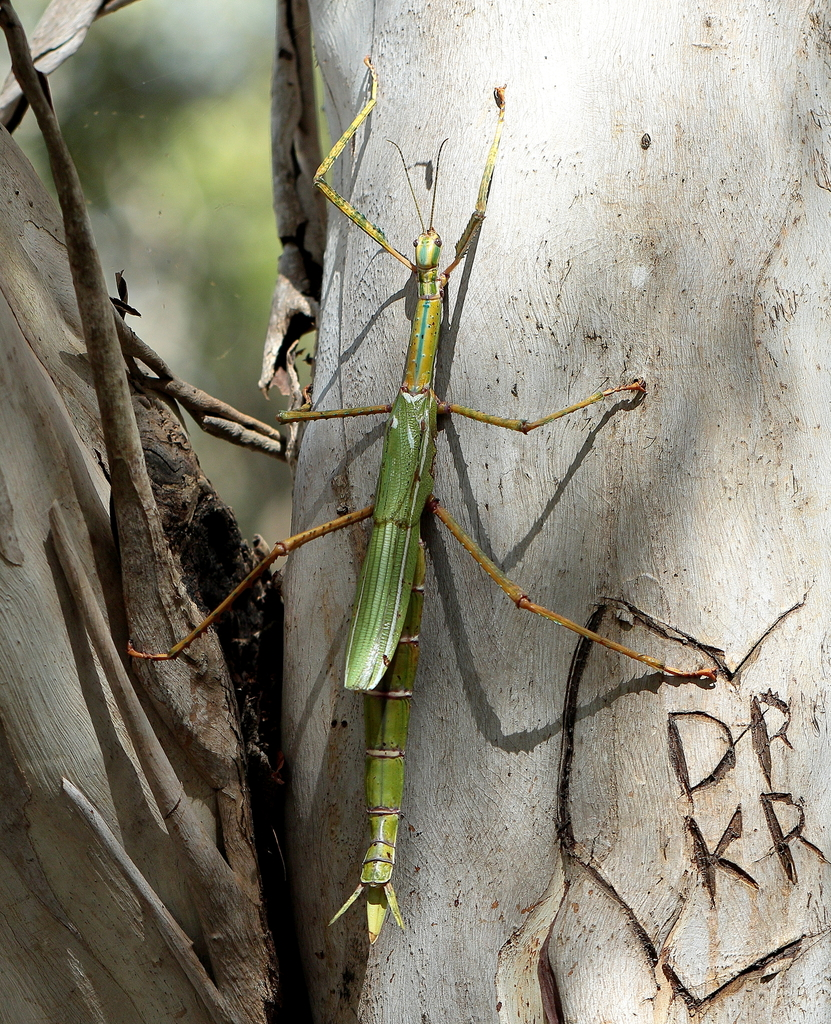
A female Eurycnema goliath on a Eucalyptus tree, a key habitat for the species and one of its primary food sources.

In response to being attacked or disturbed, E. goliath will expose the bright red ventral surface of its wings and spreads out its hind legs, then rapidly strikes them together. Additionally, false eyespots on the metacoxae will be revealed. A "swooshing" sound, made by rubbing the wings together, also accompanies the display. This display is an act of startle or deimatic behavior, performed in an attempt to scare off, startle or distract a predator.

The striking of the heavily spined hind legs also serves as an attack strategy to injure both predators and rival females.

==== Faeces removal ====
When defecating, the E. goliath will catch its frass in its operculum, and using a whole body flicking motion, it will throw them away to the ground. This is said to be an adaptation to avoid predators detecting the location of the insect through seeing nearby frass.

=== Competition ===
There is no recorded instances of competition between the males of E. goliath, however adult females have been witnessed fighting. Females have been recorded fatally injuring each other through squeezing the rival insect's body in the crook of their heavily spined hind legs.

== Diet and predation ==
=== Diet ===
The goliath stick insect is folivorous, and in the wild primarily feeds on the leaves of the Acacia and Eucalyptus species they inhabit. In captivity, the insect has been recorded eating a wider range of foods, such as leaves from Bramble, Oak, Pyracantha and Hawthorn species. Adult insects are said to eat approximately 10 medium-sized leaves per day. In the wild the species primarily feeds at night. Nymphs will tend to eat younger and more tender leaves.

=== Predation ===
Little is known about the predation of the insect in Australia, however, Eurycnema goliath has been recorded being predated on by insectivorous and omnivorous birds, with the insect serving as a key food source for nestlings of species such as Aviceda subcristata and Centropus phasianinus.

== Interaction with humans ==
As they are easy to care for and effectively harmless to humans, the goliath stick insect is commonly kept as an exotic pet and it is particularly popular among children. E. goliath is bred in captivity on a global scale, with nymphs and eggs available to buy at online retailers to be shipped globally. Adults raised in captivity are said to live 6–7 months. The insect is also often used in educational displays at museums and zoos. Due to their size, sightings of wild E. goliath are also often mentioned in local newspapers.

== See also ==
- List of Australian stick insects and mantids
