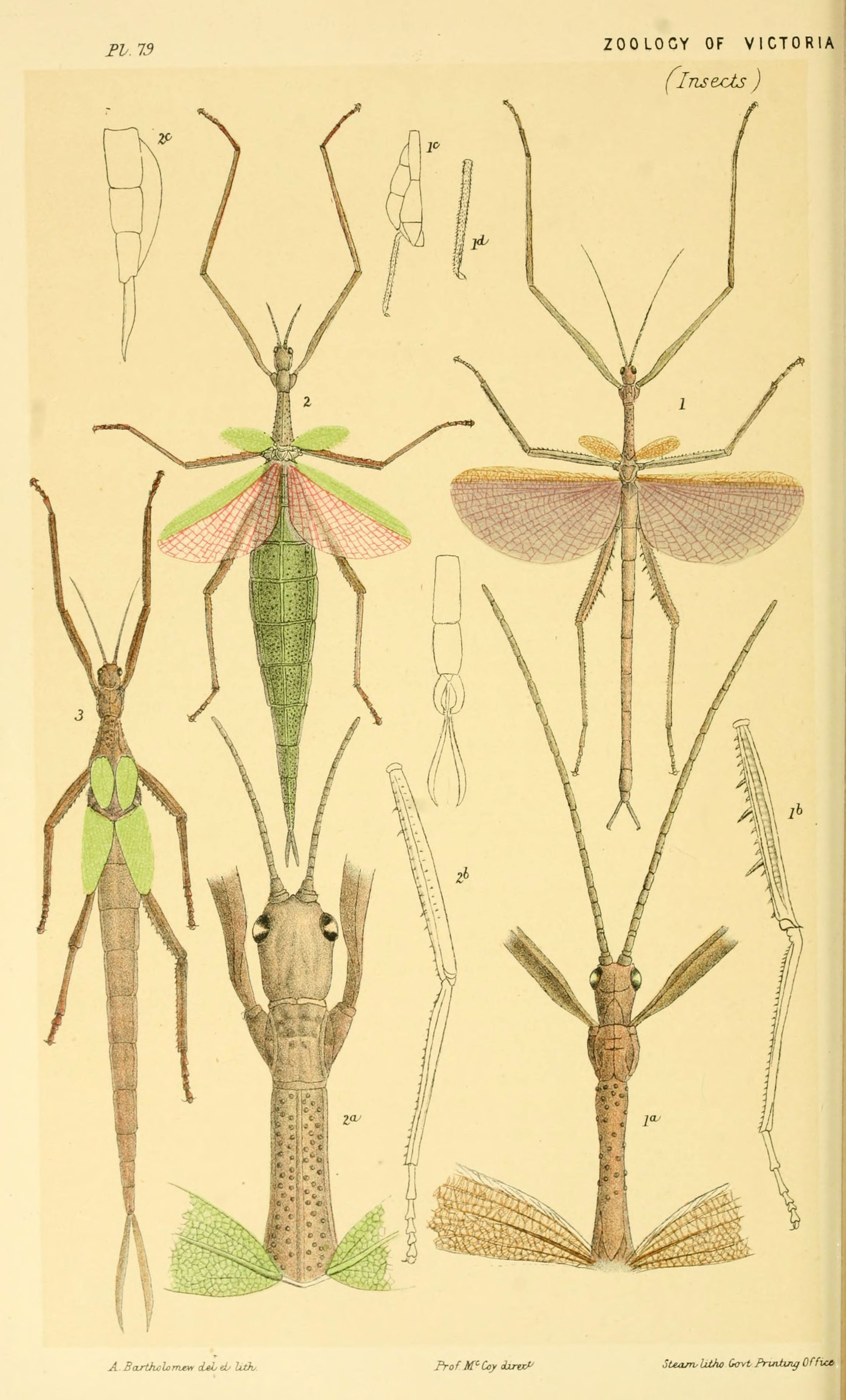
- Female

Scientific classification
- Domain: Eukaryota
- Kingdom: Animalia
- Phylum: Arthropoda
- Class: Insecta
- Order: Phasmatodea
- Family: Phasmatidae
- Genus: Didymuria
- Species: D. violescens

Binomial name
- Didymuria violescens Leach, 1815

= Didymuria violescens =

Species of stick insect

Didymuria violescens, the spur legged phasmid, also known as the violet-winged stick insect, or violet-winged phasma, is a common phasmid native to Australia.

Males have distinct spurs and thicker hind legs (the hind have the spurs) which is where the animal gets its common name, though the spurs are only found on the male. This specific type of stick insect eats Gum (Eucalyptus) leaves, female lay very many eggs as there is a low chance of live hatching from the egg. The female produces eggs that can bear young even if the eggs are not fertilized, though those hatch-lings are only female. This is called parthenogenesis. Newly hatched stick/leaf insects are called nymphs until their final (5th-7th) molt.

== See also ==
- List of Australian stick insects and mantids
