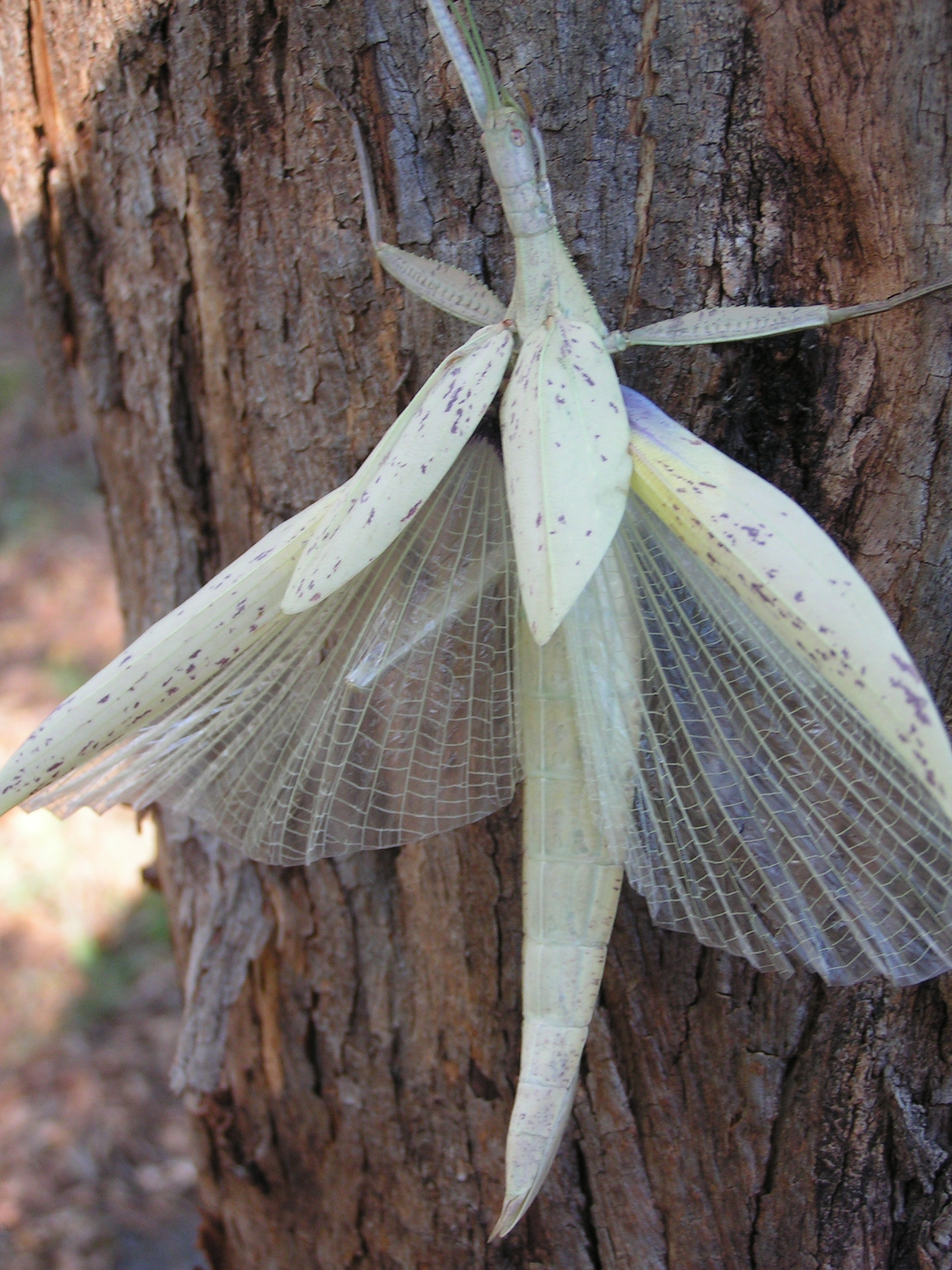

Scientific classification
- Kingdom: Animalia
- Phylum: Arthropoda
- Clade: Pancrustacea
- Class: Insecta
- Order: Phasmatodea
- Family: Phasmatidae
- Genus: Tropidoderus
- Species: T. childrenii

Binomial name
- Tropidoderus childrenii Gray, 1833

= Tropidoderus childrenii =

Species of stick insect

Tropidoderus childrenii, the Children's stick insect, was first described in 1833 by Gray. The species is named after John George Children.

== Description ==
These relatively large stick insects generally measure about 110 millimetres (4.3 in) in length and are native to Eastern Australia.

Generally, the female insect is a medium green color and closely resembles leaves, thus making it difficult to spot in the foliage. A large, dark blue spot can be found on each hindwing at the base of the remigium and anal lobe. This dark spot is usually hidden when the wings are folded down. The nymphs also have a long yellow strip that runs down the center of their bodies, which exactly matches the color of the leaf vein. The males can look very different, usually more slender and reddish-brown in color.

== Life cycle ==
During adulthood the Children's stick insect mates more than once and females lays eggs its whole life as an adult. The males fly between trees in search for the females to mate with. The females are much larger and heavier than the males and tend to not fly very far or very often. Once they mate, the females will lay the small, oval, gray eggs that will drop to the leaf litter. Laying the eggs in winter, the eggs will hatch in autumn.

== Habitat ==
They usually live in areas where eucalyptus trees are prominent, as their main source of food is the leaves of various gum or eucalyptus trees.

== Defense ==
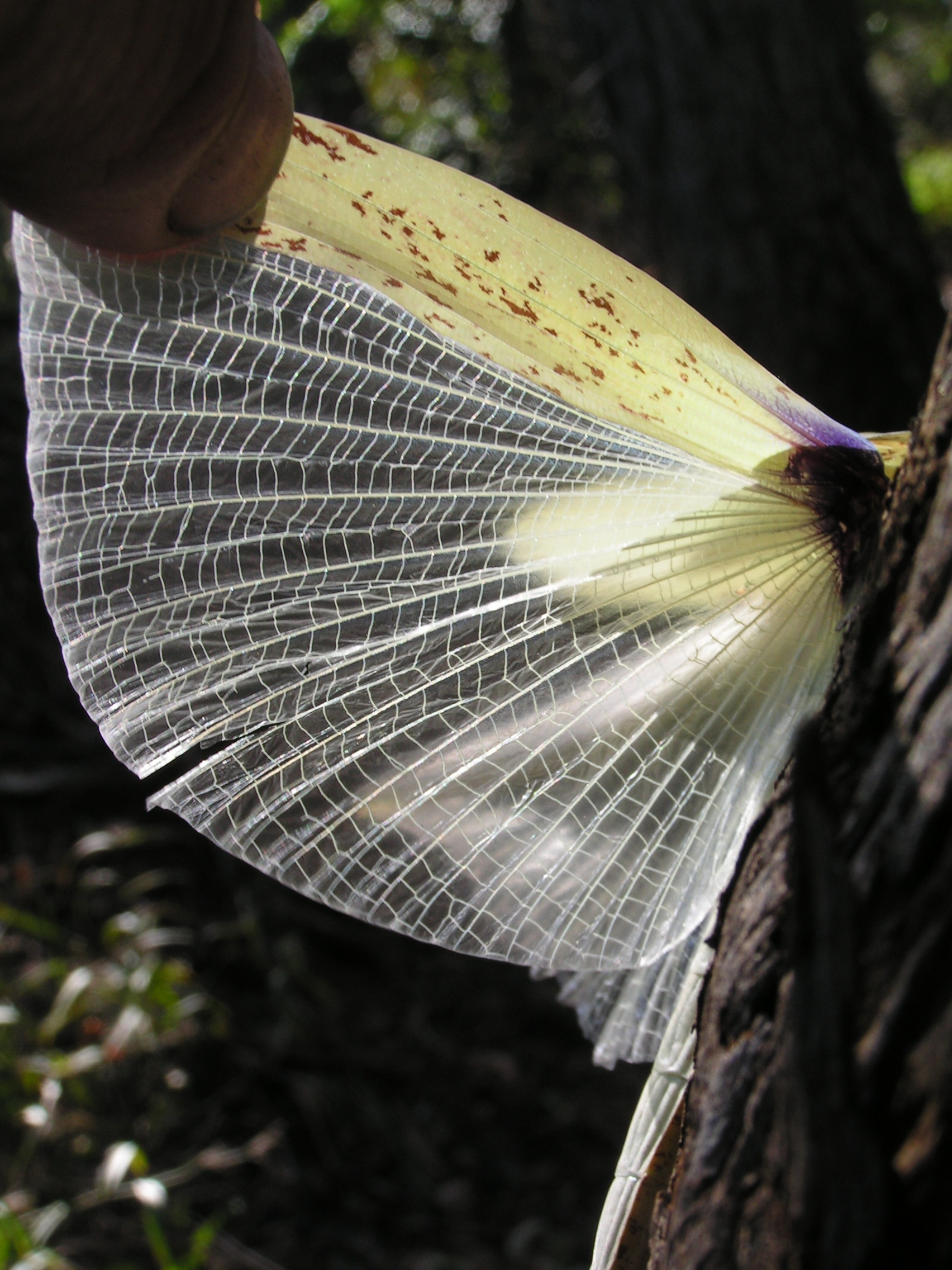
The dark blue spot can be seen on the underside of the wings. Most likely used to startle potential predators.

When disturbed, the Children's stick insect detaches its hind legs from the foliage and repeatedly strikes them together. It flaps its hindwings up and down, flashing the dark blue splotches hidden underneath. It has been shown in mantid species that actions like these can startle predators such as lizards (deimatic behaviour), and it is believed this is the case in the stick insect as well. Furthermore, the Children's stick insect has the ability to drop a limb to escape a predator (autotomy), just as a lizard can drop its tail.

== See also ==
- List of Australian stick insects and mantids
