= Thaumastochilus termitomimus =

Scientific classification
- Kingdom: Animalia
- Phylum: Arthropoda
- Subphylum: Chelicerata
- Class: Arachnida
- Order: Araneae
- Infraorder: Araneomorphae
- Family: Zodariidae
- Genus: Thaumastochilus
- Species: T. termitomimus

Binomial name
- Thaumastochilus termitomimus Jocqué, 1994

Species of spider

Thaumastochilus termitomimus is a species of spider in the family Zodariidae. It is endemic to South Africa. Unlike other members of this genus, which mimic ants, this species mimics termites.

== Etymology ==
The species name "termitomimus" refers to the resemblance of these spiders to termites, particularly the juvenile and subadult stages which show a habitus remarkably similar to Isoptera.

== Distribution ==
Thaumastochilus termitomimus is found in two provinces: Gauteng and KwaZulu-Natal, with records from Kameeldrift, Mkuzi Game Reserve, and Pongola.

== Habitat ==
The species inhabits the Savanna biome at altitudes ranging from 83 to 1,246 m above sea level.

== Description ==
Both sexes of Thaumastochilus termitomimus are known. Males range from 4.48 to 5.76 mm in total length with a uniform dark reddish brown carapace, chelicerae, and anterior legs, all thinly clothed with silvery hairs. Females reach 6.27 mm in total length with a brownish yellow carapace and creamy white abdomen bearing a faint darker central pattern.

== Ecology ==
Thaumastochilus termitomimus are termite mimics that live on trees where they construct silken retreats. The type specimens were found on Acacia tortilis, with some specimens found in silk retreats under bark. They appear to live primarily arboreal lifestyles away from soil.

== Conservation ==
The species is listed as Data Deficient by the IUCN. Despite being known from a small area, more sampling is needed to determine its full range.
