= Asceua foordi =

Foord's Asceua spider

Conservation status
- Least Concern (SANBI Red List)

Scientific classification
- Kingdom: Animalia
- Phylum: Arthropoda
- Subphylum: Chelicerata
- Class: Arachnida
- Order: Araneae
- Infraorder: Araneomorphae
- Family: Zodariidae
- Genus: Asceua
- Species: A. foordi

Binomial name
- Asceua foordi Jocqué & Henrard, 2024

Species of spider

Asceua foordi is a species of spider in the family Zodariidae. It is found in Africa and is commonly known as Foord's Asceua spider.

== Etymology ==
The species is named in memory of South African arachnologist Stefan Hendrik Foord (1971-2023).

== Distribution ==
Asceua foordi occurs in the Democratic Republic of the Congo, Guinea, and South Africa. Within South Africa, the species has been recorded from the Eastern Cape and KwaZulu-Natal provinces, including localities such as Coffee Bay, Kei Mouth, Mazeppa Bay, and several nature reserves.

== Habitat ==
The species occurs at altitudes ranging from 5 to 1,336 metres above sea level. In South Africa, it inhabits coastal forests where it has been collected using various methods including sweeping, litter sifting, and hand collecting.

== Description ==
The species is known from both sexes and is characterized by its ant-mimicking appearance, with a dark coloration and white spots on the abdomen.

== Ecology ==
Asceua foordi are free-living plant and litter-dwellers that mimic small black ants, which they probably prey upon. In tropical Africa, specimens have been collected from forest canopies using fogging techniques.

== Conservation ==
The species is listed as Least Concern by the South African National Biodiversity Institute due to its wide geographical range across Africa. No significant threats have been identified.
