= Melychiopharis cynips =

Scientific classification
- Kingdom: Animalia
- Phylum: Arthropoda
- Subphylum: Chelicerata
- Class: Arachnida
- Order: Araneae
- Infraorder: Araneomorphae
- Family: Araneidae
- Genus: Melychiopharis
- Species: M. cynips

Binomial name
- Melychiopharis cynips Simon, 1895

Species of spider

Melychiopharis cynips is an ant-mimicking spider from Brazil.

It was briefly transferred from the family Araneidae to Theridiidae between 2002 and 2005, based mainly on characteristics of the male palp.
