= Sarinda =

Sarinda may refer to:

- Sarinda, a genus of jumping spiders
- Sarinda, an Indian stringed instrument
