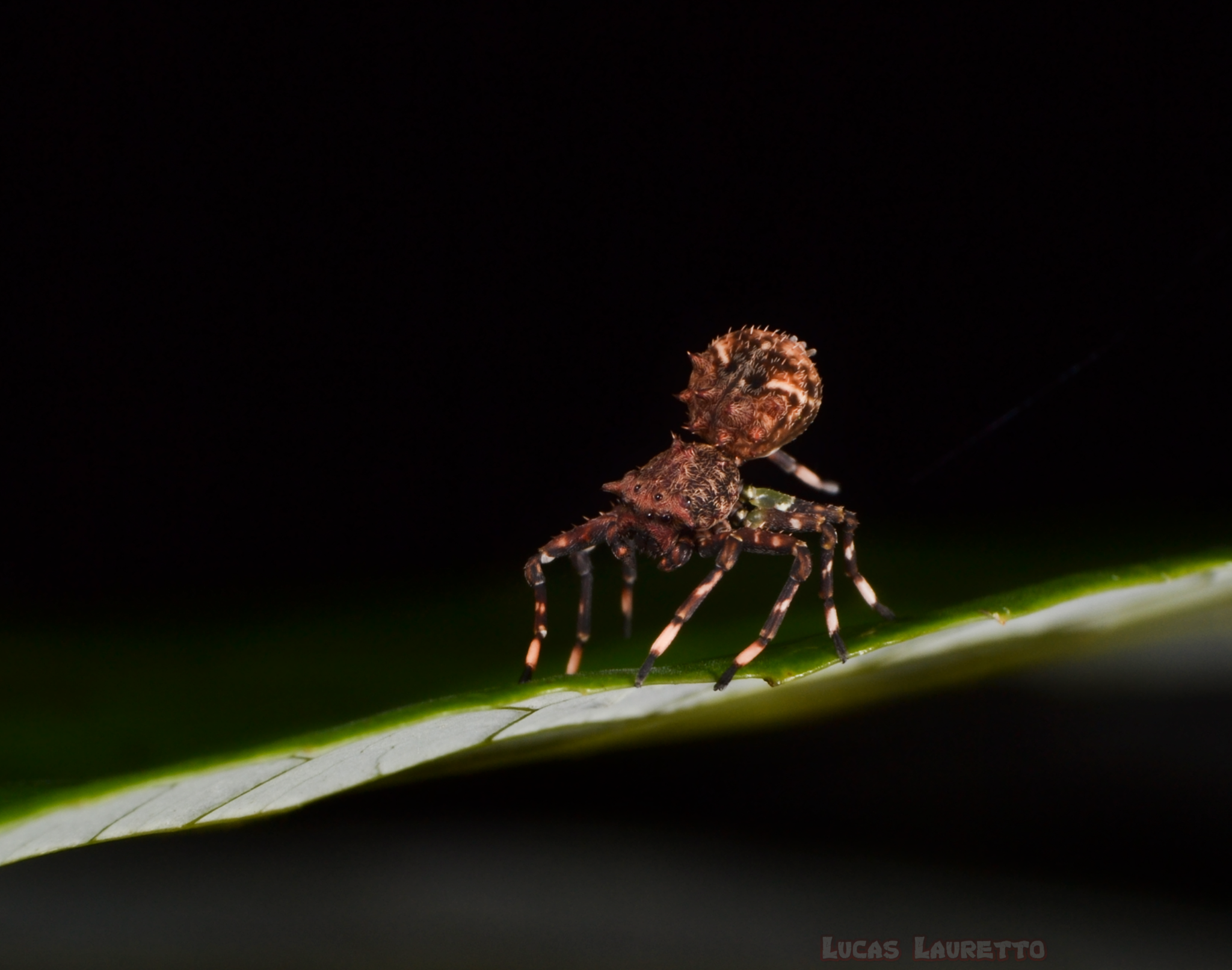

Scientific classification
- Domain: Eukaryota
- Kingdom: Animalia
- Phylum: Arthropoda
- Subphylum: Chelicerata
- Class: Arachnida
- Order: Araneae
- Infraorder: Araneomorphae
- Family: Thomisidae
- Genus: Bucranium
- Species: B. taurifrons

Binomial name
- Bucranium taurifrons O. Pickard-Cambridge, 1881

= Bucranium taurifrons =

Species of spider

Bucranium taurifrons is a species of ant-mimicking crab spiders from South America. It is found in Venezuela, Guyana, Peru, Brazil and Paraguay.

Like the crab spider Aphantochilus, it mimic ants of the genus Cephalotes (probably C. atratus), which are their preferred prey. It also carries dead ants.

== Name ==
Tauros means "bull" in Greek, frons is Latin for "front".
