= Thaumastochilus =

Scientific classification
- Kingdom: Animalia
- Phylum: Arthropoda
- Subphylum: Chelicerata
- Class: Arachnida
- Order: Araneae
- Infraorder: Araneomorphae
- Family: Zodariidae
- Genus: Thaumastochilus; Simon, 1897

Species
- 2, See text

Genus of arachnids

Thaumastochilus is a spider genus of the family Zodariidae, containing two described species endemic to South Africa.

== Species ==
As of September 2025, this genus includes two species:

- Thaumastochilus martini Simon, 1897 type species)
- Thaumastochilus termitomimus Jocqué, 1994
