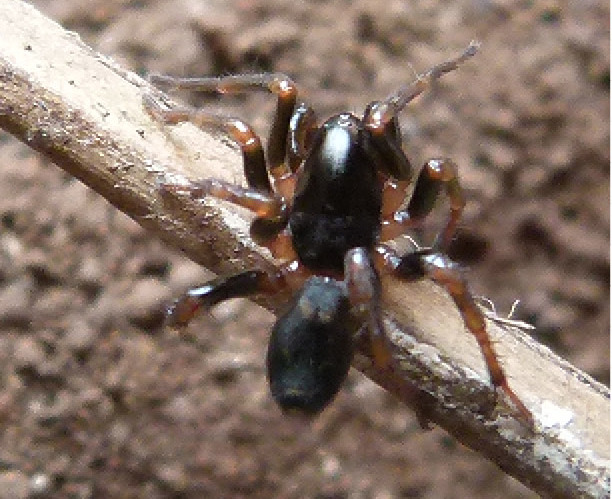
- A. cingulata

Scientific classification
- Kingdom: Animalia
- Phylum: Arthropoda
- Subphylum: Chelicerata
- Class: Arachnida
- Order: Araneae
- Infraorder: Araneomorphae
- Family: Zodariidae
- Genus: Asceua; Thorell, 1887

Type species
- Asceua elegans

Species
- 47, see text

Synonyms
- Doosia; Suffucia

= Asceua =

Genus of spiders

Asceua is a genus of ant spiders first described by Tamerlan Thorell in 1887.

== Species ==
As of September 2025, this genus includes 47 species:

- Asceua adunca B. S. Zhang & F. Zhang, 2018 – Laos
- Asceua amabilis Thorell, 1897 – Myanmar
- Asceua anding B. S. Zhang, F. Zhang & Jia, 2012 – China
- Asceua arborivaga Jocqué & Henrard, 2024 – Guinea
- Asceua banlaoensis H. B. Zhang & F. Zang, 2025 – China
- Asceua bifurca B. S. Zhang & F. Zhang, 2018 – Malaysia (Borneo)
- Asceua calciformis Li, Liu & Peng, 2022 – China
- Asceua chayu Wang, Mu, Lu, Xu & Zhang, 2024 – China
- Asceua cingulata (Simon, 1905) – India
- Asceua curva B. S. Zhang & F. Zhang, 2018 – Malaysia (Borneo)
- Asceua daoxian Yin, 2012 – China
- Asceua dawai Wang, Mu, Lu, Xu & Zhang, 2024 – China
- Asceua digitata Li, Liu & Peng, 2022 – China
- Asceua dispar (Kulczyński, 1911) – Indonesia (Java)
- Asceua elegans Thorell, 1887 – Myanmar (type species)
- Asceua expugnatrix Jocqué, 1995 – Australia (Northern Territory, Queensland)
- Asceua foordi Jocqué & Henrard, 2024 – Guinea, DR Congo, South Africa
- Asceua forcipiformis Li, Liu & Peng, 2022 – China
- Asceua gruezoi Barrion & Litsinger, 1992 – Philippines
- Asceua haocongi Lin & Li, 2023 – China (Hainan)
- Asceua heliophila (Simon, 1893) – Philippines
- Asceua incensa Jocqué & Henrard, 2024 – DR Congo
- Asceua japonica (Bösenberg & Strand, 1906) – Japan
- Asceua jianfeng Song & Kim, 1997 – China
- Asceua kunming Song & Kim, 1997 – China
- Asceua lejeunei Jocqué, 1991 – Guinea, Ivory Coast, Ghana, Nigeria, Ethiopia, DR Congo
- Asceua longji Barrion-Dupo, Barrion & Heong, 2013 – China (Hainan)
- Asceua luki Jocqué & Henrard, 2024 – DR Congo
- Asceua maculosa Logunov, 2010 – Vietnam
- Asceua menglun Song & Kim, 1997 – China
- Asceua nangunhe H. B. Zhang & F. Zang, 2025 – China
- Asceua palustris Jocqué & Henrard, 2024 – DR Congo
- Asceua piperata Ono, 2004 – Laos, Vietnam
- Asceua quadrimaculata B. S. Zhang, F. Zhang & Jia, 2012 – China
- Asceua quinquestrigata (Simon, 1905) – Indonesia (Java)
- Asceua radiosa Jocqué, 1986 – Comoros, Mayotte
- Asceua septemmaculata (Simon, 1893) – Vietnam
- Asceua shuangreni Lin & Li, 2023 – Vietnam
- Asceua similis Song & Kim, 1997 – China
- Asceua tertia Asima, Sankaran & Prasad, 2024 – India
- Asceua thrippalurensis Sankaran, 2023 – India
- Asceua torquata (Simon, 1909) – China, Laos, Vietnam
- Asceua trimaculata B. S. Zhang & F. Zhang, 2018 – Malaysia (peninsula)
- Asceua ventrofigurata Jocqué & Henrard, 2024 – Tanzania
- Asceua wallacei Bosmans & Hillyard, 1990 – Indonesia (Sulawesi)
- Asceua zijin Lin & Li, 2023 – China
- Asceua zodarionina (Simon, 1907) – Guinea-Bissau
