= Asceua elegans =

Scientific classification
- Kingdom: Animalia
- Phylum: Arthropoda
- Subphylum: Chelicerata
- Class: Arachnida
- Order: Araneae
- Infraorder: Araneomorphae
- Family: Zodariidae
- Genus: Asceua
- Species: A. elegans

Binomial name
- Asceua elegans Thorell, 1887

Species of spider

Asceua elegans is a species of spiders in the family Zodariidae. It is the type species of the genus. It is found in Myanmar.
