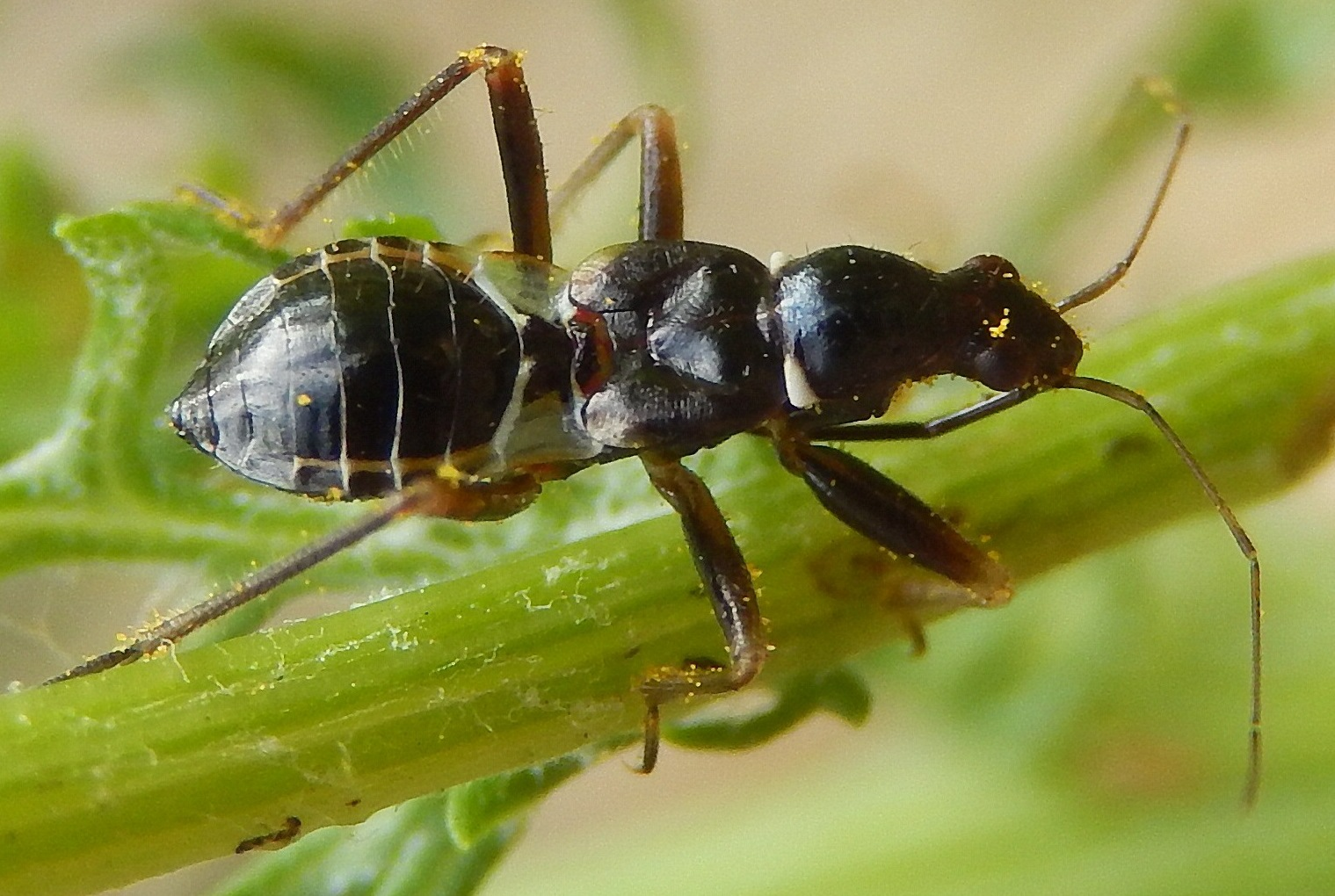

Scientific classification
- Kingdom: Animalia
- Phylum: Arthropoda
- Clade: Pancrustacea
- Class: Insecta
- Order: Hemiptera
- Suborder: Heteroptera
- Family: Miridae
- Subfamily: Mirinae
- Tribe: Stenodemini
- Genus: Myrmecoris; Gorski, 1852
- Species: M. gracilis

Binomial name
- Myrmecoris gracilis (R. Sahlberg, 1848)

Synonyms
- Globiceps gracilis R. Sahlberg, 1848; Miris lituanicus Gorski, 1852; Myrmecoris rubricatus Jakovlev, 1882; Myrmecoris fusca Reuter, 1879; Myrmecoris rufuscula Reuter, 1879

= Myrmecoris =

Genus of true bugs

Myrmecoris gracilis is a species of flightless Hemipteran bug from the family Miridae. The genus Mymecoris is monotypic with one Palaearctic species. It differs in its outward appearance and way of life from other "grass bugs" in the Stenodemini, being predatory and an effective ant mimic.

== Description ==
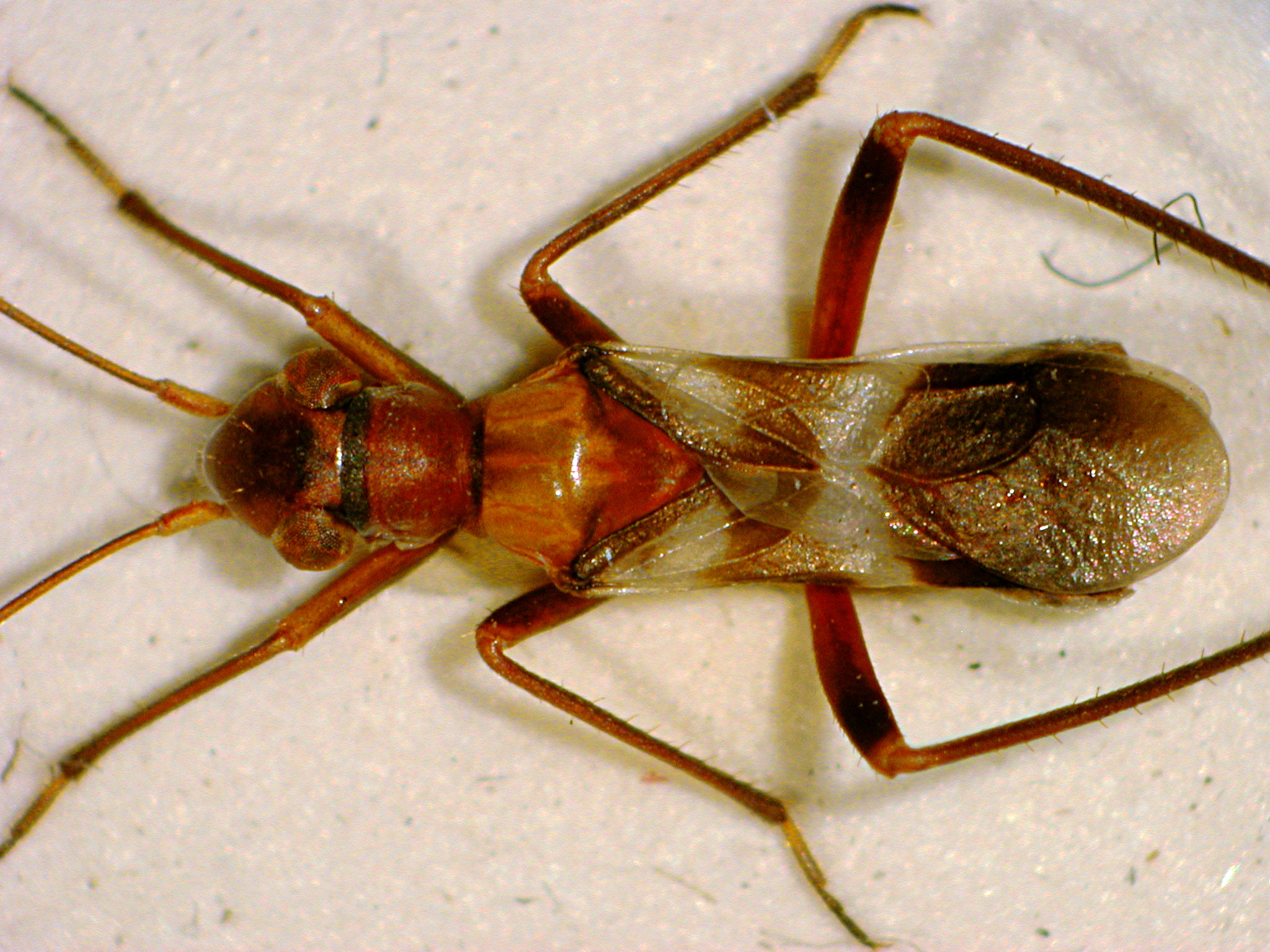
Winged adult

The bugs are four to six millimeters long. The adult insects resemble ants of the genus Formica, the larvae dark Lasius ant species. The appearance of a typical hymenopteran "waist" is created by the paler coloration of the front of the abdomen and the back of the thorax, contrasting with the rest of the body which is mainly black, effectively camouflaging the bug's thick waist. They are often found together with ants, to which they have a convincing but superficial resemblance. The long rostrum is held inconspicuously beneath the head.

The bugs suck plant juices, but feed mainly on aphids, other small insects and insect eggs, sometimes on honeydew, unlike other "grass bugs" (Stenodemini) which are exclusively herbivorous. The larvae hatch in May. The adults can be found from early June to early August. There is one generation a year. The overwintering eggs are buried in older blades of grass. Both sexes are usually flightless but some winged individuals occur.

The generic name is from Ancient Greek: Μύρμηξ, Múrmēx, ant, and κόρῐς, kóris, bug. The specific name is the Latin for slender or graceful.

== Distribution and habitat ==
Myrmecoris gracilis is found across the whole of northern and central Europe, as well as the western part of the northern Mediterranean. To the east it is common in Siberia, China and Korea. The bug lives on dry and warm to moderately damp, grassy open habitats. The adults can be seen climbing on grasses and herbaceous plants in cool damp weather.

The species was formerly classed by the IUCN as "Rare" in its pre-1994 system; in the UK, the species had been recorded in 15 ten-kilometre squares or fewer at that time. It is described as a "not common" inhabitant of dry heathland in Britain, where it is confined to the far south of England in an area bounded by Exeter, Bristol, Oxford, Luton and Eastbourne. In the Avon Gorge it forms 11.1% of the insect visitors to Trinia glauca.

== Sources ==
- M. Chinery: Collins Complete Guide to British Insects. Collins, 2005. Pages 96–97. ISBN 978-0-007-29899-0.
- E. Wachmann, A. Melber, J. Deckert: Cimicomorpha. Microphysidae (Flechtenwanzen), Miridae (Weichwanzen). Goecke & Evers, Keltern 2004. ISBN 3-931-37457-2.
