= Thaumastochilus martini =

Scientific classification
- Kingdom: Animalia
- Phylum: Arthropoda
- Subphylum: Chelicerata
- Class: Arachnida
- Order: Araneae
- Infraorder: Araneomorphae
- Family: Zodariidae
- Genus: Thaumastochilus
- Species: T. martini

Binomial name
- Thaumastochilus martini Simon, 1897

Species of spider

Thaumastochilus martini is a species of spider in the family Zodariidae. It is endemic to KwaZulu-Natal province in South Africa.

== Distribution ==
Thaumastochilus martini is found in KwaZulu-Natal, with records from iSimangaliso Wetland Park (Hell's Gate and Cape Vidal) and Nongoma.

== Habitat ==
The species inhabits the Indian Ocean Coastal Belt and Savanna biomes at altitudes ranging from 7 to 793 m above sea level.

== Description ==
Thaumastochilus martini is known only from females, which reach 9.6 mm in total length. The carapace is dark reddish brown with a paler wedge-shaped mark between the fovea and posterior margin. The chelicerae are dark brown, while the sternum is orange brown. The anterior legs are dark brown except for the femora, of which only the distal quarter is brown. The abdomen displays a dark dorsal pattern on a pale background.

== Ecology ==
Thaumastochilus martini are spiders with elongated bodies that inhabit coastal and savanna regions.

== Conservation ==
The species is listed as Data Deficient by the IUCN for taxonomic reasons. More sampling is needed to collect males and determine the species' full range.
