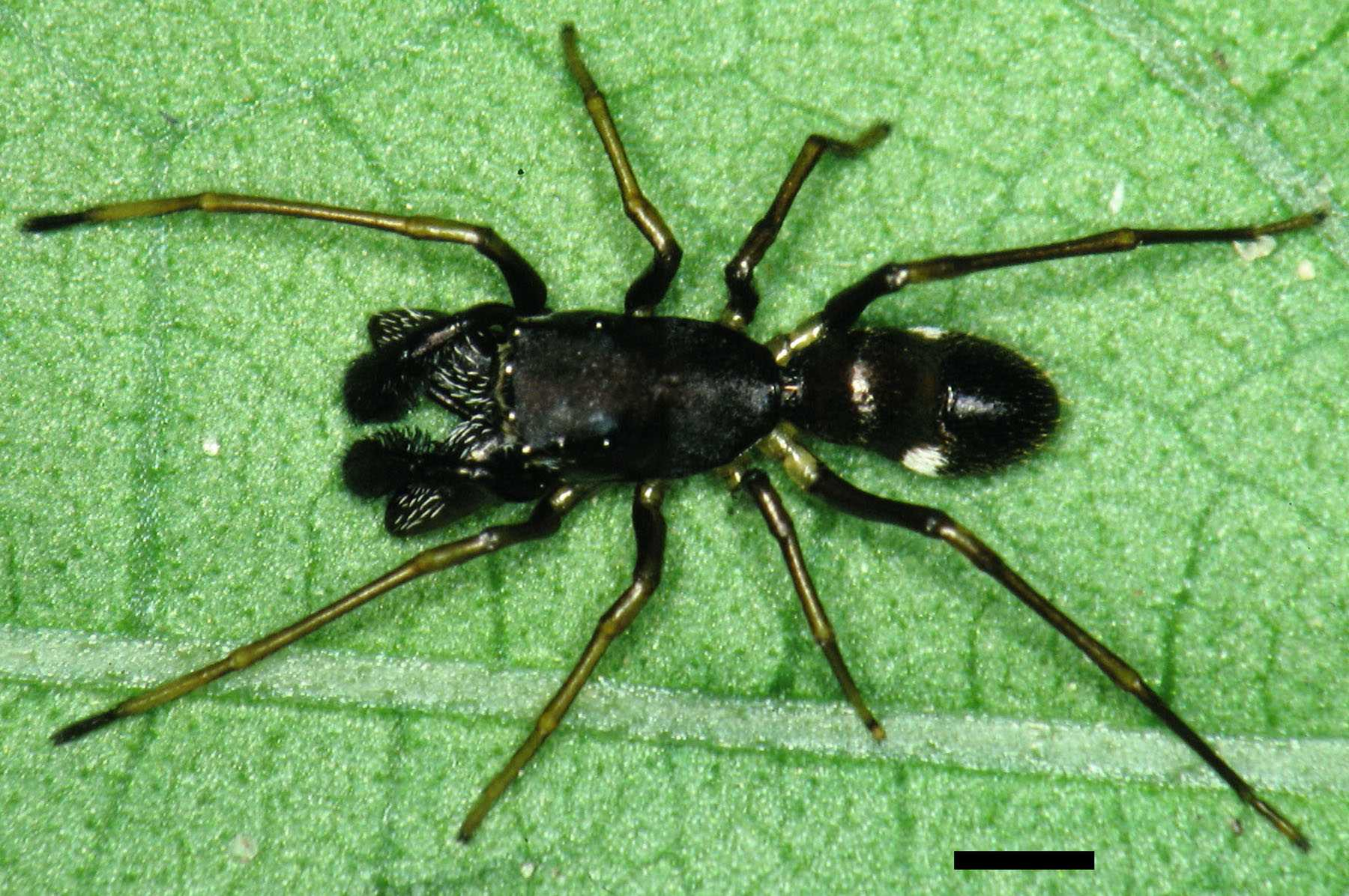
- Male Sarinda hentzi

Scientific classification
- Kingdom: Animalia
- Phylum: Arthropoda
- Subphylum: Chelicerata
- Class: Arachnida
- Order: Araneae
- Infraorder: Araneomorphae
- Family: Salticidae
- Subfamily: Salticinae
- Genus: Sarinda; Peckham & Peckham, 1892

Type species
- S. nigra Peckham & Peckham, 1892

Species
- 17, see text

Synonyms
- Cineas Simon, 1901

= Sarinda (spider) =

Sarinda Temporal range: Neogene– Present

Genus of spiders

Sarinda is a genus of ant mimicking jumping spiders that was first described by George and Elizabeth Peckham in 1892.

== Species ==
As of August 2019 it contains seventeen species, found in the Americas from Argentina to the southern United States and on the Greater Antilles:

- Sarinda armata (Peckham & Peckham, 1892) – Panama to Peru
- Sarinda atrata (Taczanowski, 1871) – French Guiana
- Sarinda capibarae Galiano, 1967 – Brazil
- Sarinda cayennensis (Taczanowski, 1871) – Brazil, French Guiana
- Sarinda chacoensis Galiano, 1996 – Argentina
- Sarinda cutleri (Richman, 1965) – USA, Mexico
- Sarinda exilis (Mello-Leitão, 1943) – Brazil
- Sarinda glabra Franganillo, 1930 – Cuba
- Sarinda hentzi (Banks, 1913) – USA
- Sarinda imitans Galiano, 1965 – Argentina
- Sarinda longula (Taczanowski, 1871) – French Guiana
- Sarinda marcosi Piza, 1937 – Brazil, Argentina
- Sarinda nigra Peckham & Peckham, 1892 (type) – Nicaragua, Brazil, Guyana, Argentina
- Sarinda panamae Galiano, 1965 – Panama
- Sarinda pretiosa Banks, 1909 – Costa Rica
- Sarinda ruficeps (Simon, 1901) – Colombia
- Sarinda silvatica Chickering, 1946 – Panama
