= Melychiopharis =

Scientific classification
- Kingdom: Animalia
- Phylum: Arthropoda
- Subphylum: Chelicerata
- Class: Arachnida
- Order: Araneae
- Infraorder: Araneomorphae
- Family: Araneidae
- Genus: Melychiopharis; Simon, 1895

Type species
- M. cynips Simon, 1895

Species
- 5, See text.

Genus of spiders

Melychiopharis is a genus of South American orb-weaver spiders first described by Eugène Simon in 1895.

== Species ==
As of November 2026 it contains five species.

- Melychiopharis bibendum Brescovit, Santos & Leite, 2011 — Brazil
- Melychiopharis cynips Simon, 1895 — Brazil
- Melychiopharis davincii Dupérré & Tapia, 2024 — Ecuador
- Melychiopharis komischetier Dupérré & Tapia, 2024 — Ecuador
- Melychiopharis peruviana Dupérré & Tapia, 2024 — Peru
