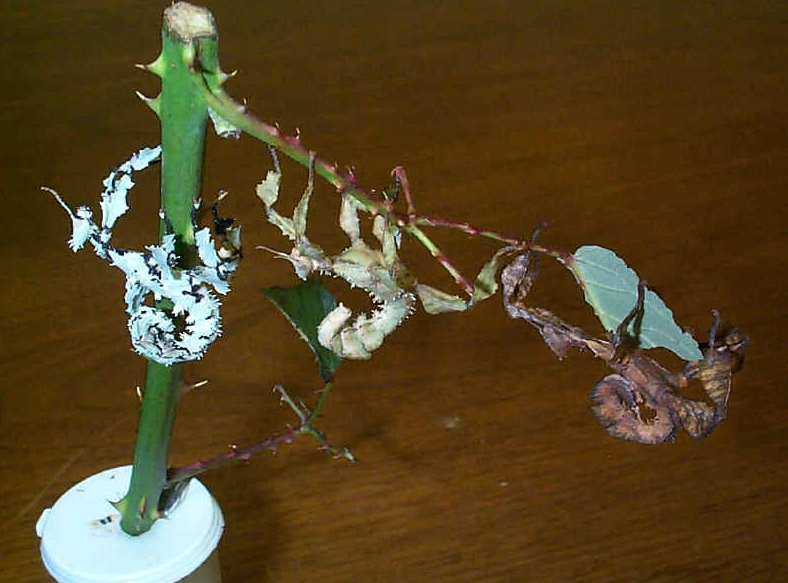
- E. popa carlbergi, E.tiaratum, E. popa popa

Scientific classification
- Kingdom: Animalia
- Phylum: Arthropoda
- Class: Insecta
- Order: Phasmatodea
- Family: Phasmatidae
- Subfamily: Extatosomatinae
- Genus: Extatosoma; Gray, 1833

Synonyms
- Ectatosoma Gray, 1835

= Extatosoma =

Genus of insects

Extatosoma is a genus of phasmids, in the monotypic subfamily Extatosomatinae, with two species. One occurs in Australia, one in New Guinea. Both have a colour morph imitating leaves, and one imitating lichen.

== Name ==
The genus name is derived from Ancient Greek έκστασις "to be outside oneself" and soma "body".

== Species ==
The Phasmida Species File lists:

- Extatosoma popa Stål, 1875 (New Guinea)
- Extatosoma tiaratum (Macleay, 1826) - type species (Australia)
