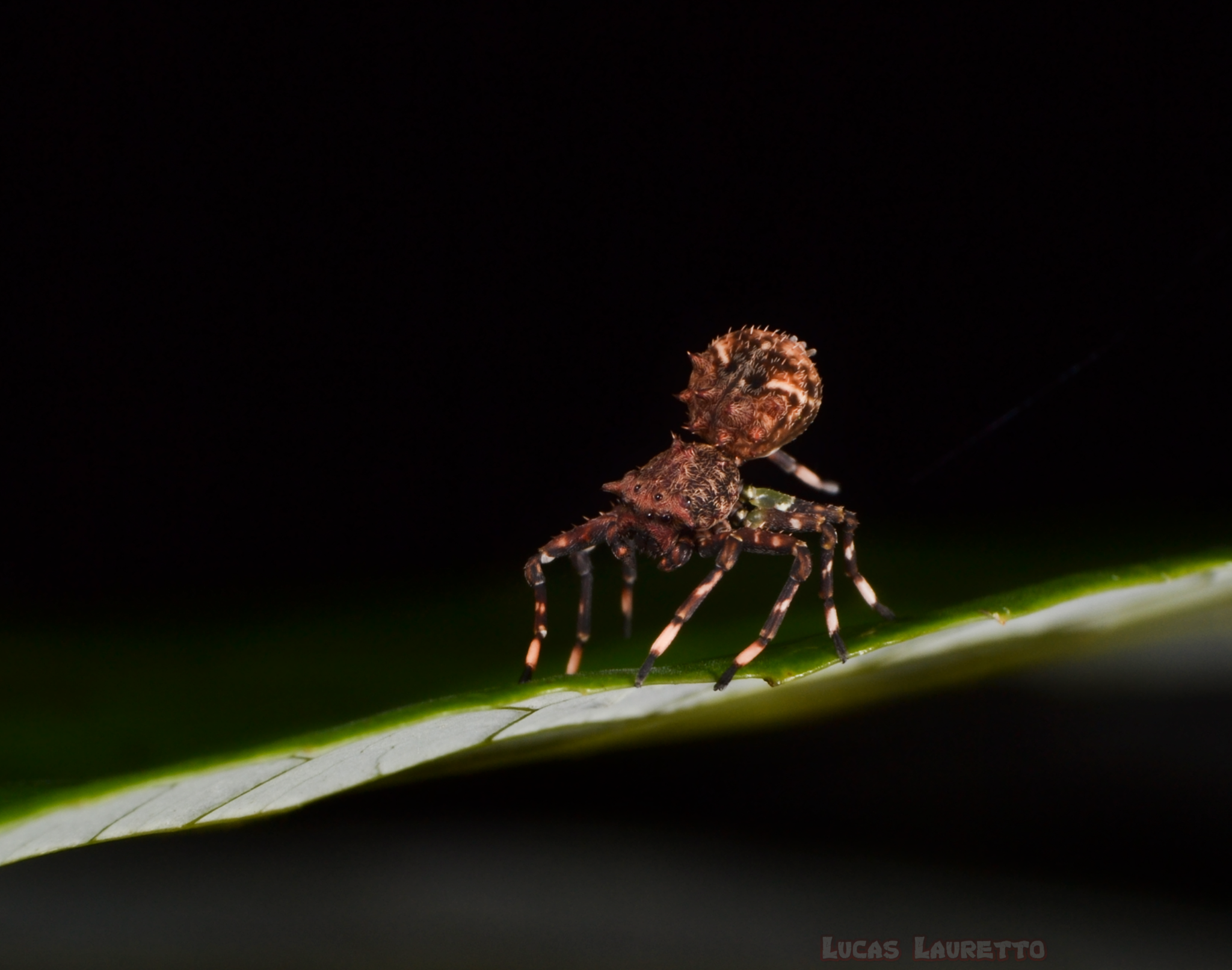
- Bucranium taurifrons

Scientific classification
- Kingdom: Animalia
- Phylum: Arthropoda
- Subphylum: Chelicerata
- Class: Arachnida
- Order: Araneae
- Infraorder: Araneomorphae
- Family: Thomisidae
- Genus: Bucranium; Pickard-Cambridge, 1881

Species
- See text.

= Bucranium (spider) =

Genus of spiders

Bucranium is a genus of spiders in the family Thomisidae.

== Species ==
As of December 2021, the World Spider Catalog accepted the following four extant species:

- Bucranium affine (O. Pickard-Cambridge, 1896) – Mexico
- Bucranium pulchrum (Bryant, 1940) – Cuba
- Bucranium spinigerum O. Pickard-Cambridge, 1891 – Guatemala
- Bucranium taurifrons O. Pickard-Cambridge, 1881 (type species) – Venezuela, Guyana, Peru, Brazil, Paraguay
