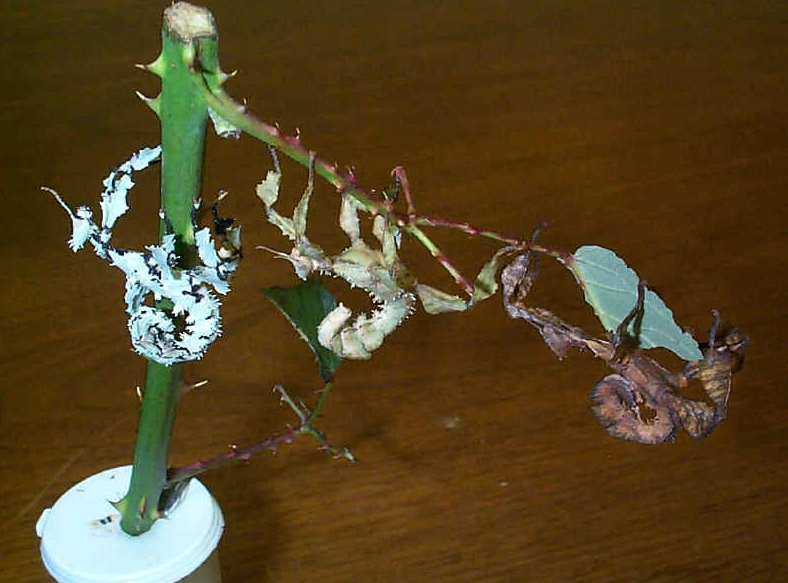

Scientific classification
- Kingdom: Animalia
- Phylum: Arthropoda
- Clade: Pancrustacea
- Class: Insecta
- Order: Phasmatodea
- Family: Phasmatidae
- Genus: Extatosoma
- Species: E. popa

Binomial name
- Extatosoma popa Stål, 1875

= Extatosoma popa =

Species of stick insect

Extatosoma popa is a species of stick insect in the genus Extatosoma from New Guinea. The subspecies: E. popa carlbergi (Beccaloni, 1993) was previously recognised.

== Description ==
The species can grow up to 16 cm (6.3 in) in size, and is a leaf mimic.

== Behaviour ==
E. popa curls its abdomen upwards in order to better camouflage itself as a leaf.
