= Aphantochilus =

- Aphantochilus rogersi, Brazil

Scientific classification
- Kingdom: Animalia
- Phylum: Arthropoda
- Subphylum: Chelicerata
- Class: Arachnida
- Order: Araneae
- Infraorder: Araneomorphae
- Family: Thomisidae
- Genus: Aphantochilus; O. Pickard-Cambridge, 1871

Type species
- A. rogersi O. Pickard-Cambridge, 1871

Species
- A. cambridgei Canals, 1933 – Argentina; A. inermipes Simon, 1929 – Brazil; A. rogersi O. Pickard-Cambridge, 1871 – Panama to Paraguay

Synonyms
- Cryptoceroides Piza, 1937

Genus of spiders

Aphantochilus is a genus of ant-mimicking crab spiders that was first described by Octavius Pickard-Cambridge in 1871. As of June 2020 it contains three species, found in Paraguay, Brazil, Argentina, and Panama: A. cambridgei, A. inermipes, and A. rogersi. It is a senior synonym of Cryptoceroides.

Aphantochilus rogersi is polymorphic.
