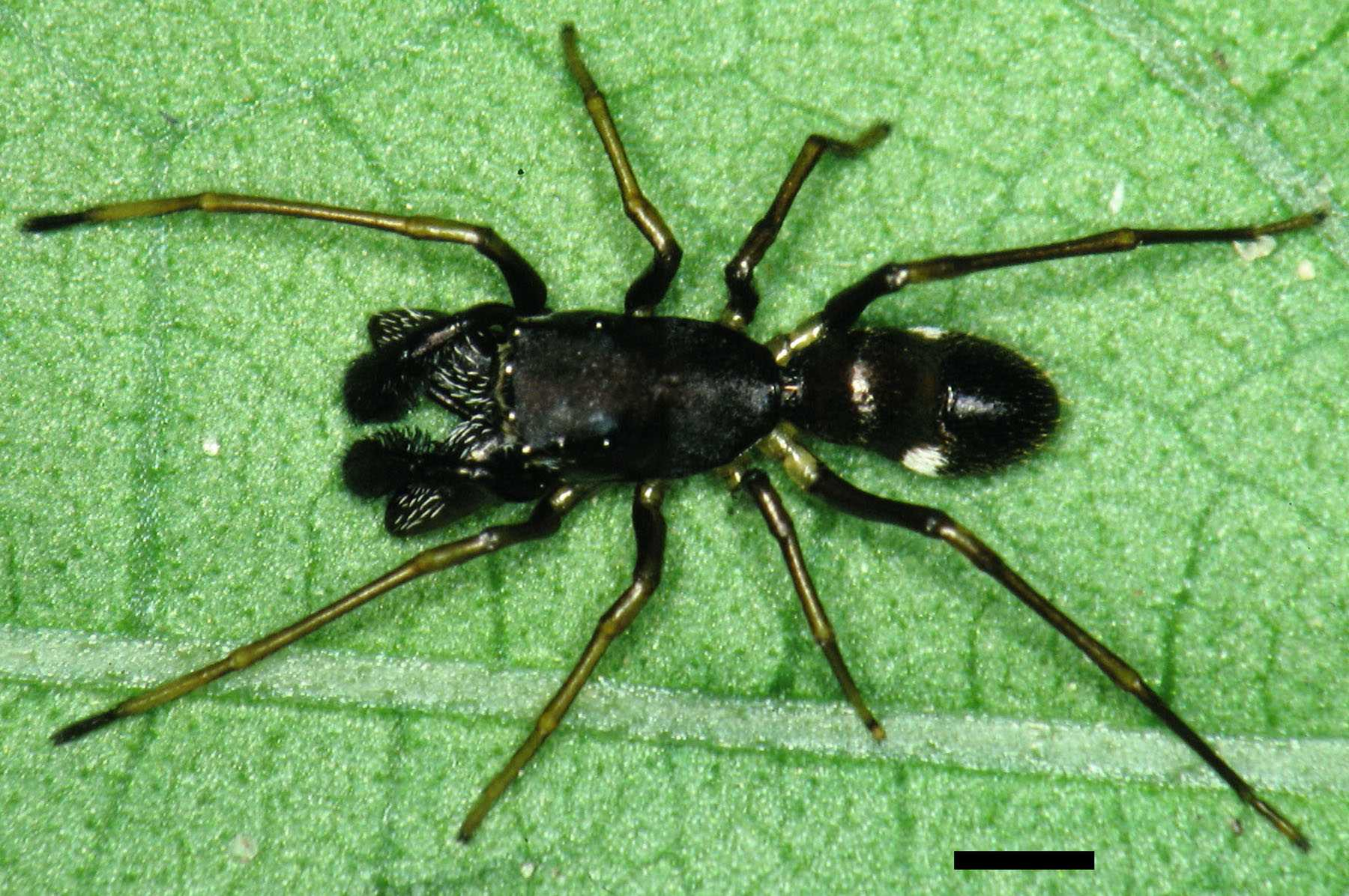
- Male

Scientific classification
- Kingdom: Animalia
- Phylum: Arthropoda
- Subphylum: Chelicerata
- Class: Arachnida
- Order: Araneae
- Infraorder: Araneomorphae
- Family: Salticidae
- Genus: Sarinda
- Species: S. hentzi

Binomial name
- Sarinda hentzi (Banks, 1913)

= Sarinda hentzi =

Species of spider

Sarinda hentzi is a species of jumping spider in the family Salticidae. It is found in the United States.
