= Ant mimicry =

Animals that resemble ants

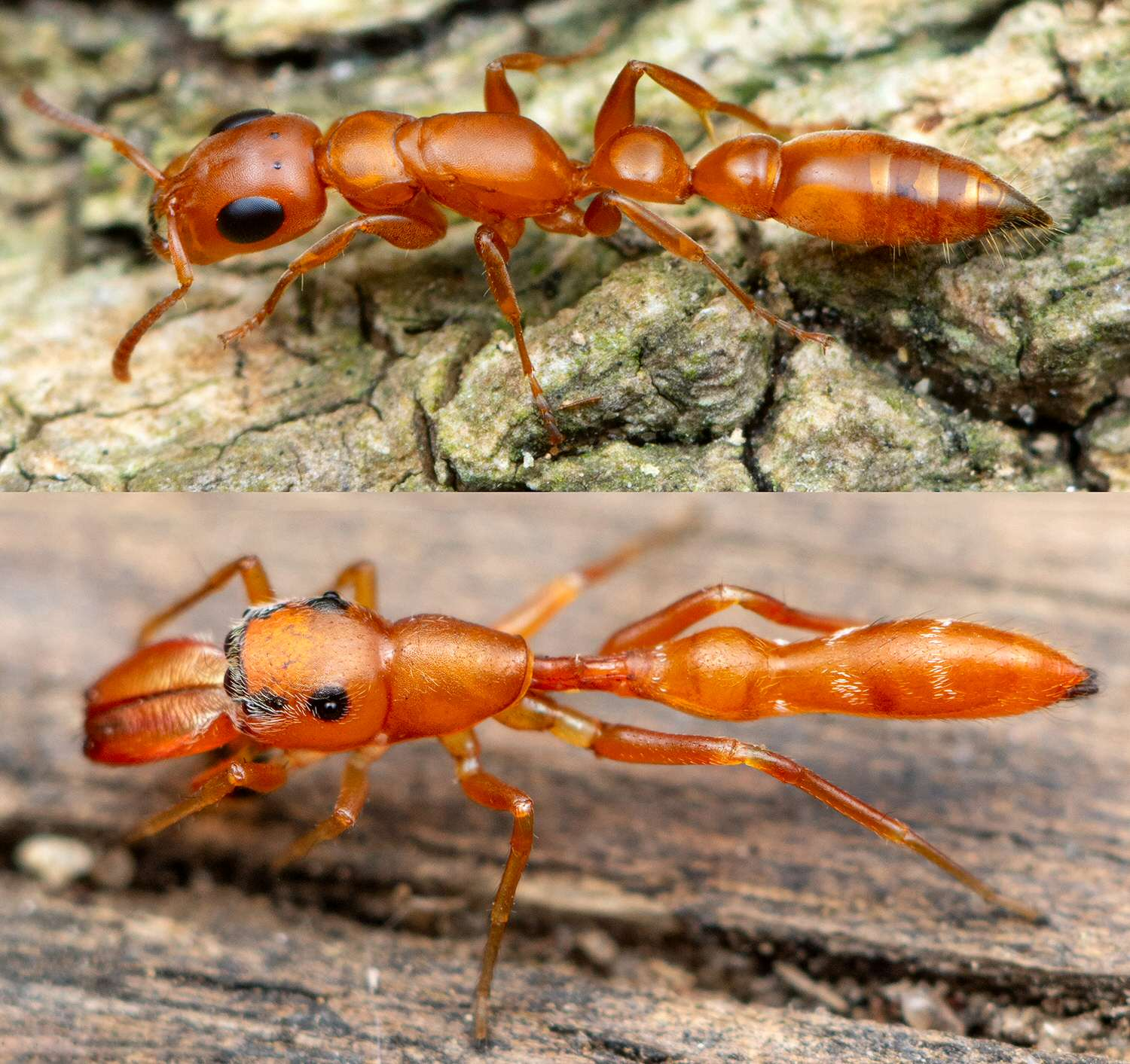
Top: An ant in Mozambique Bottom: An ant-mimicking spider, Myrmarachne

Ant mimicry or myrmecomorphy is mimicry of ants by other organisms, mainly arthropods. It has independently evolved over 70 times in different species. Ants are abundant all over the world, and potential predators that rely on vision to identify their prey, such as birds and wasps, normally avoid them, because they are either unpalatable or aggressive. Some arthropods mimic ants to escape predation (Batesian mimicry), while some predators of ants, especially spiders, mimic them anatomically and behaviourally in aggressive mimicry. Ant mimicry has existed almost as long as ants themselves; the earliest ant mimics in the fossil record appear in the mid-Cretaceous alongside the earliest ants.

Ant mimics can be myrmecophilous, with the mimics and their ant models living commensally together. In the case of ants, the mimic is an inquiline in the ants' nest. Such mimics may in addition be Batesian or aggressive mimics. To overcome ants' powerful defences, mimics may imitate ants chemically with ant-like pheromones, visually, or by imitating an ant's surface microstructure to defeat the ants' tactile inspections.

== Types ==
=== Batesian mimicry ===
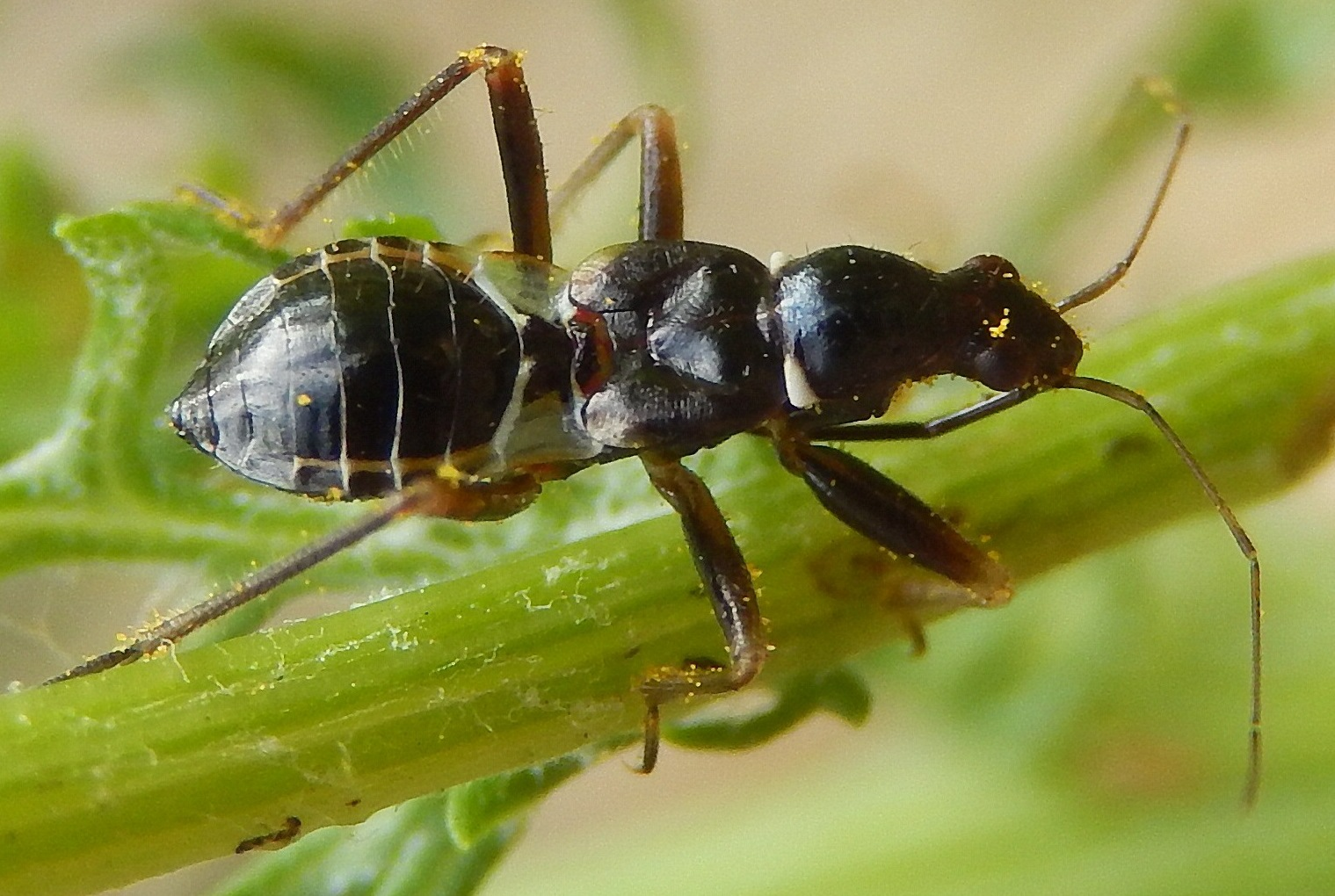
The thick waist of the Mirid ant bug, Myrmecoris gracilis, is camouflaged with white markings.

Batesian mimics lack strong defences of their own, and make use of their resemblance to a well-defended model, in this case ants, to avoid being attacked by their predators. A special case is where the predator is itself an ant, so that only two species are involved. The mimicry can be extremely close: for instance, Dipteran flies in the genus Syringogaster "strikingly" resemble Pseudomyrmex and are hard even for experts to distinguish "until they take flight". Insects that do not share the narrow-waisted body plan of ants are sometimes elaborately camouflaged to improve their resemblance. For example, the thick waist of the Mirid ant bug Myrmecoris gracilis has white markings at the front of its abdomen and the back of its thorax, making it look ant-waisted.

Batesian mimicry versus myrmecophily as other species mimic ants

Over 300 spider species mimic the social behaviours, morphological features and predatory behaviour of ants. Many genera of jumping spiders (Salticidae) mimic ants. Jumping spiders in the genus Myrmarachne are Batesian mimics which resemble the morphological and behavioural properties of ants to near perfection. These spiders mimic the behavioural features of ants such as adopting their zig-zag locomotion pattern. Further, they create an antennal illusion by waving their first or second pair of legs in the air. The slender bodies of these spiders make them more agile, allowing them to easily escape from predators. Studies on this genus have revealed that the major selection force is the avoidance of ants by predators such as spider wasps and other larger jumping spiders. Ant mimicry has a cost, given the body plan of spiders: the body of spider myrmecomorphs is much narrower than non-mimics, reducing the number of eggs per eggsac, compared to non-mimetic spiders of similar size. They seem to compensate by laying more eggsacs over their lifetimes. A study of three species of mantises suggested that they innately avoided ants as prey, and that this aversion extends to ant-mimicking jumping spiders.

Some of the many jumping spiders that are Batesian mimics of ants

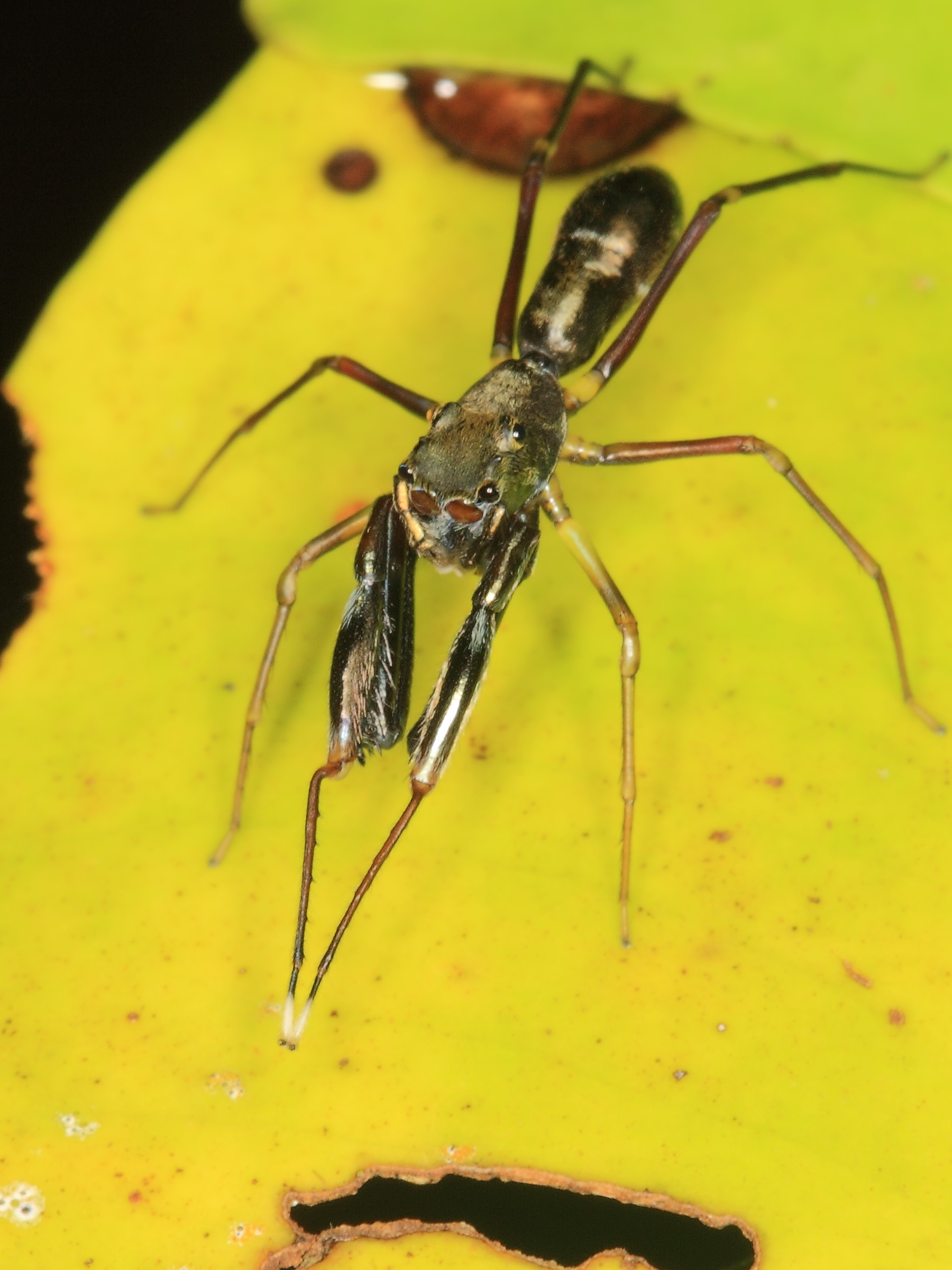
Diolenius phrynoides

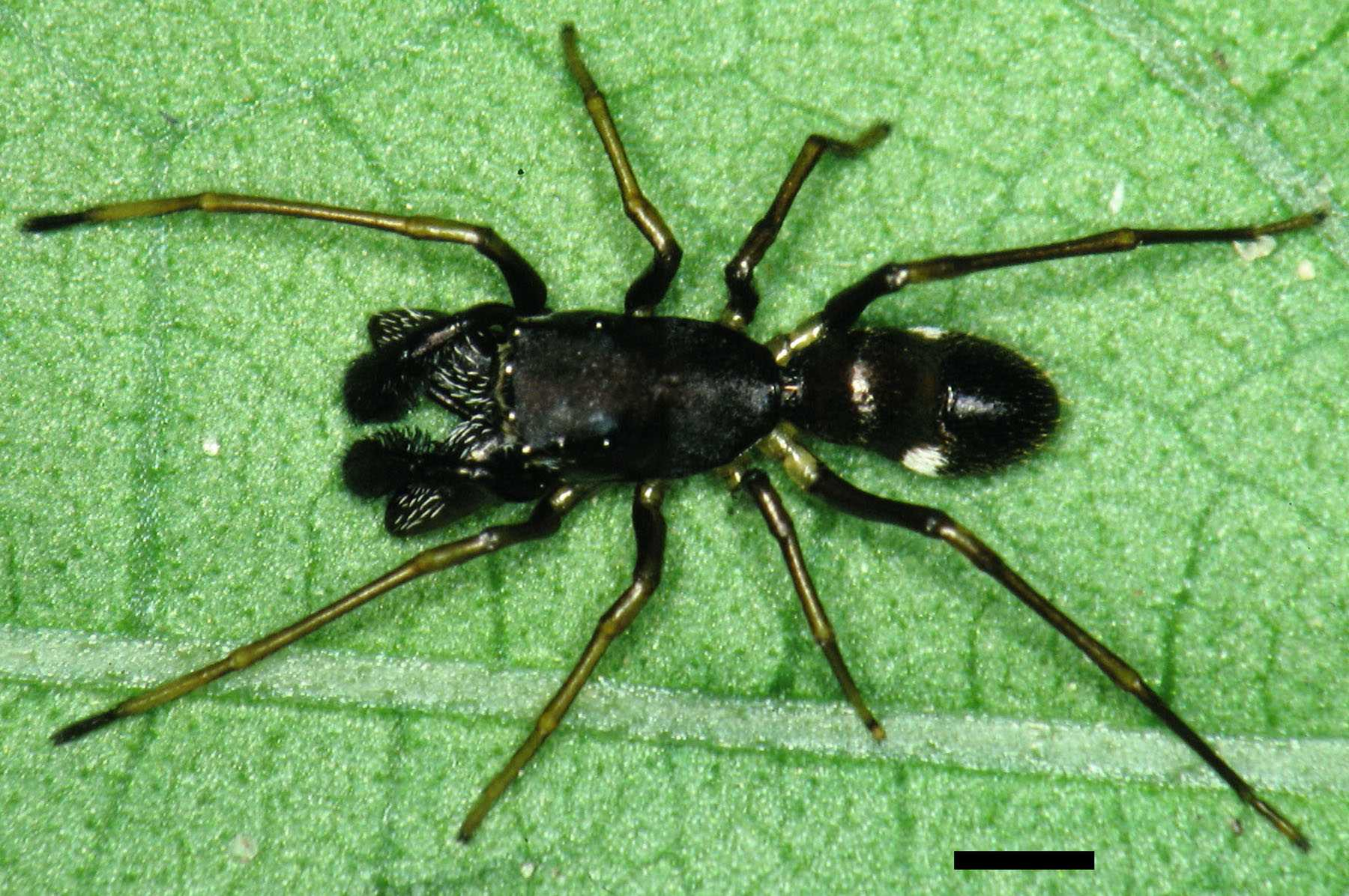
Sarinda hentzi

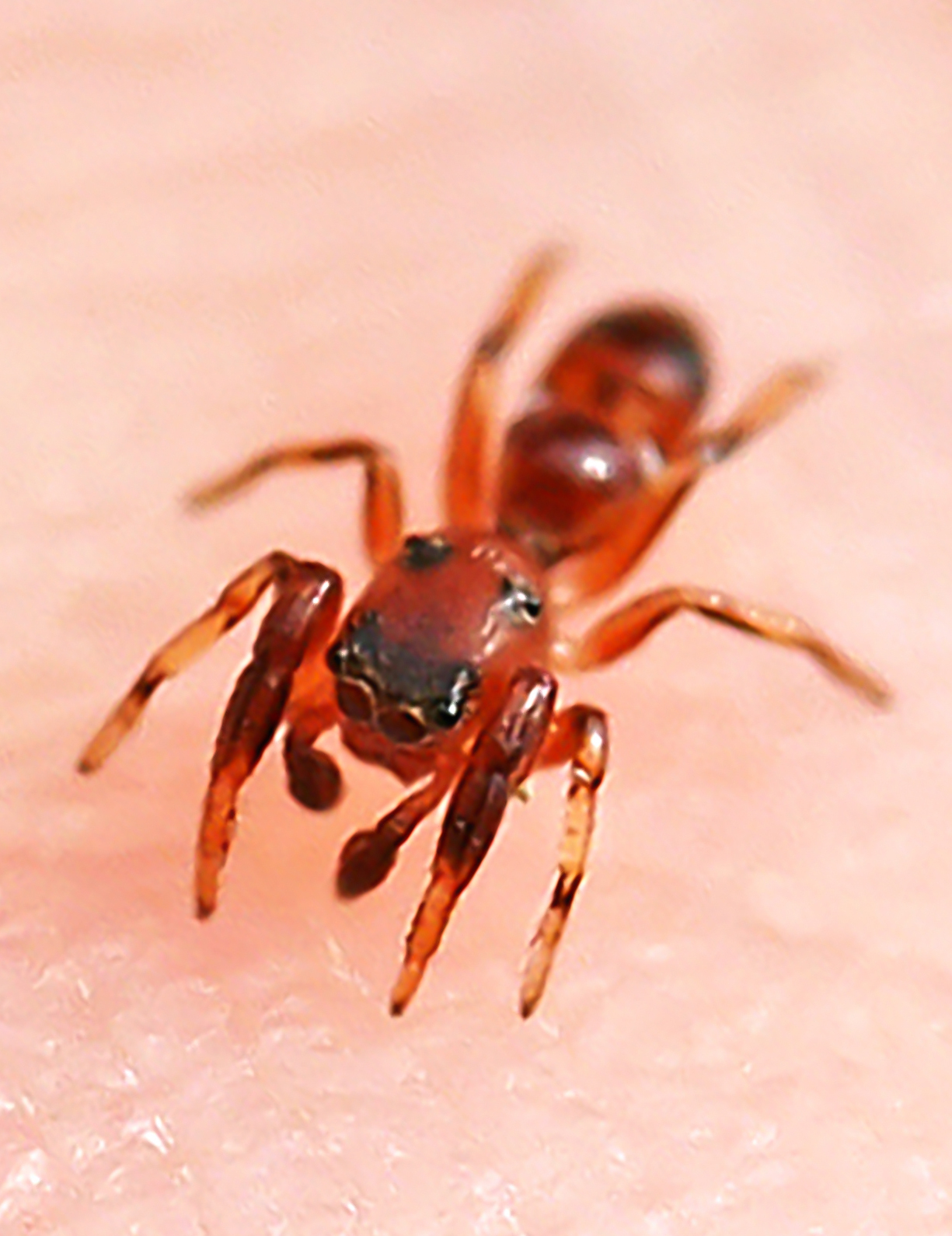
Synageles

Batesian mimicry of ants appears to have evolved even in certain plants, as a visual anti-herbivory strategy. Passiflora flowers of at least 22 species, such as P. incarnata, have dark dots and stripes on their flowers for this purpose.

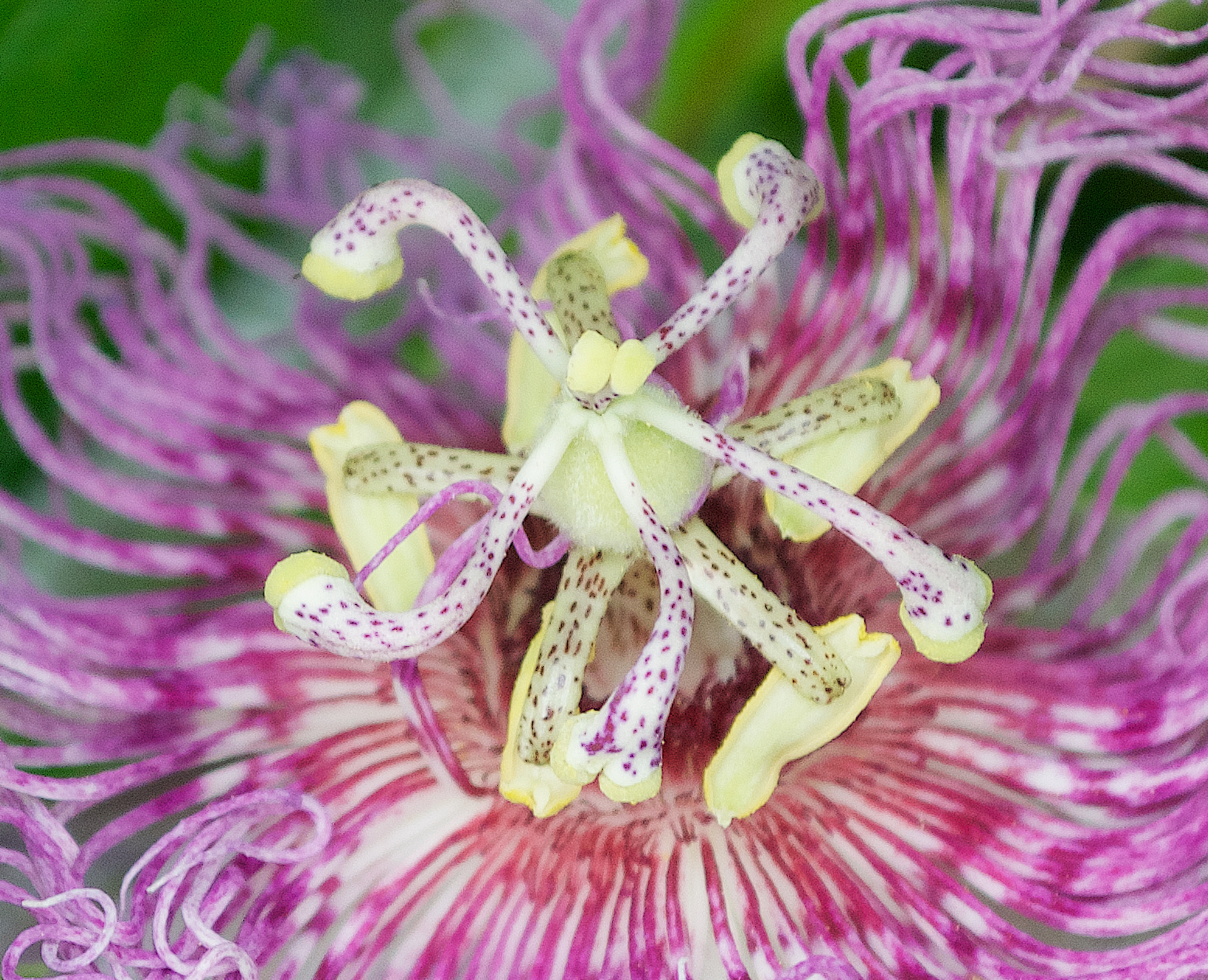
It has been suggested that the elongated spots on the reproductive organs of Passiflora incarnata and related species are ant-mimicking to deter herbivores.

=== Myrmecophily ===
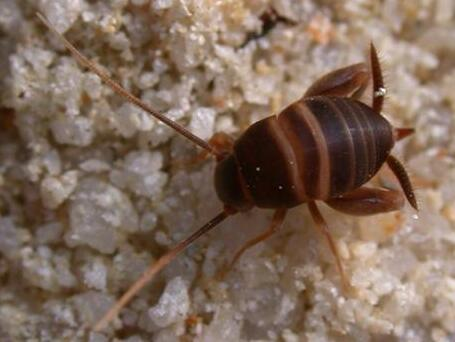
The cricket Myrmecophilus acervorum is a myrmecophile, resembling its ant hosts by touch, or perhaps by pheromones, but not visually.

Some arthropods are myrmecophilic, meaning they live in close association with ant colonies. They are not necessarily visual mimics, but often impersonate ants through non-visual means, including touch, behaviour, and pheromones. The mimicry allows them to live unharmed within ant nests, some beetles even marching with the aggressive Eciton burchellii army ants. The Jesuit priest Erich Wasmann, who discovered ant mimicry, listed 1,177 myrmecophiles in 1894; many more such species have been discovered since then.

The cricket Myrmecophilus acervorum was one of the earliest myrmecophiles to be studied; its relationship with ants was first described by the Italian naturalist Paolo Savi in 1819. It has many ant species as hosts, and occurs in large and small morphs suited to large hosts like Formica and Myrmica, and the small workers of species such as Lasius. On first arriving in an ants' nest, the crickets are attacked by the workers, and are killed if they do not run fast enough. Within a few days, however, they adjust their movements to match those of their hosts, and are then tolerated. Mimicry appears to be achieved by a combination of social releasers (signals), whether by imitating the ants' solicitation (begging) signals with suitable behaviour or ant pheromones with suitable chemicals; Hölldobler and Wilson propose that Wasmannian mimicry, where the mimic lives alongside the model, be redefined to permit any such combination, making it essentially a synonym for myrmecophily.

Mites are among the most speciose mimics of ants, and can occur in large numbers in an ant colony. A single colony of Eciton burchellii army ants may contain some 20,000 inquiline mites. The phoretic mite Planodiscus (Uropodidae) attaches itself to the tibia of its host ant, Eciton hamatum. The cuticular sculpturing of the mite's body as seen under the electron microscope strongly resembles the sculpturing of the ant's leg, as do the arrangements and number of the bristles (setae). Presumably, the effect is that when the ant grooms its leg, the tactile sensation is as it would be in mite-free grooming.

The snail Allopeas myrmekophilos lives in colonies of the army ant Leptogenys distinguenda. The snails live in bivouacs of the ants except when the colony migrates, during which the ants carry along the snails. A. myrmekophilos feeds on the meat of animals killed by the ants.

==== Lycaenid butterflies ====
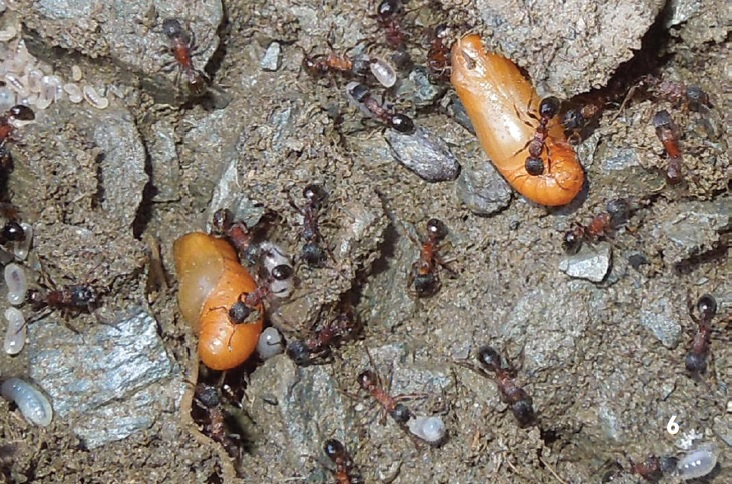
Pupae of the lycaenid butterfly Phengaris rebeli in ant nest

Some 75% of lycaenid butterfly species are myrmecophiles, their larvae and pupae living as social parasites in ant nests. These lycaenids mimic the brood pheromone and the alarm call of ants so they can integrate themselves into the nest. In Aloeides dentatis the tubercles release the mimicking pheromone which deceives its host, the ant Acantholepis caprensis, into caring for the mimics as they would their own brood. In these relationships, worker ants give the same preference to the lycaenids as they do to their own brood, demonstrating that chemical signals produced by the mimic are indistinguishable to the ant. Larvae of the mountain Alcon blue, Phengaris rebeli, similarly mimic Myrmica ants and feed on their brood.

==== Parasitoid wasps ====
The parasitoid wasp Gelis agilis (Ichneumonidae) shares many similarities with the ant Lasius niger. G. agilis is a wingless wasp which exhibits multi-trait mimicry of garden ants, imitating the ant's morphology, behaviour, and surface chemicals that serve as pheromones, cuticular hydrocarbons. When threatened it releases a toxic chemical similar to the ant's alarm pheromone. This multi-trait mimicry serves to protect G. agilis both from ants and (in Batesian mimicry) from ground predators such as wolf spiders.

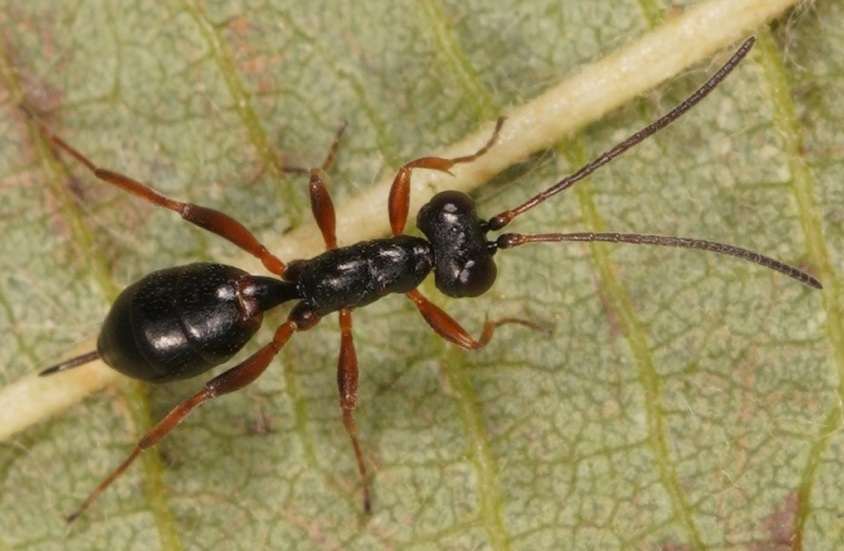
Mimic: Gelis agilis,
a wingless Ichneumonid wasp

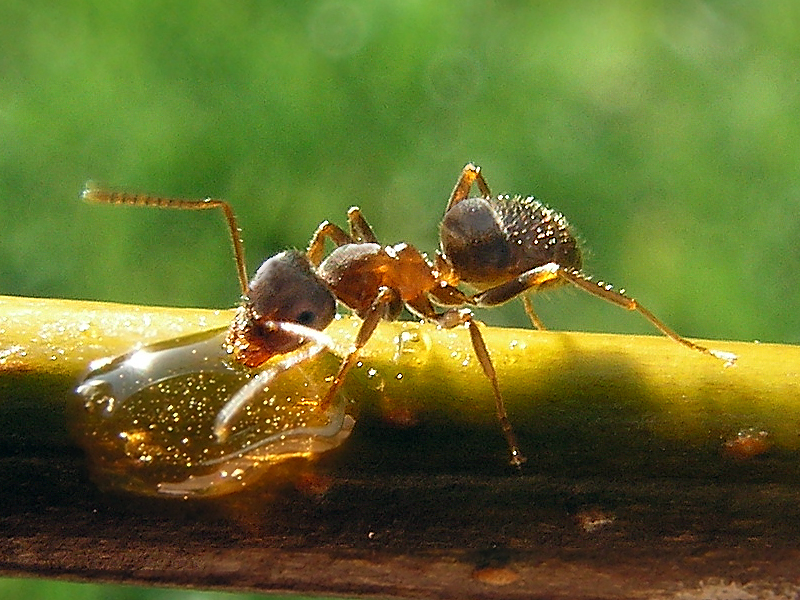
Model: Lasius niger

=== Aggressive mimicry ===
Aggressive mimics are predators which resemble ants sufficiently to be able to approach their prey successfully. Some spiders, such as the Zodariidae and those in the genus Myrmarachne, use their disguise to hunt ants. These ant hunters often do not visually resemble ants very closely. Among the many spiders which are aggressive mimics of ants, Aphantochilus rogersi mimics its sole prey, Cephalotini ants. Like many other ant-mimicking spiders, it is also a Batesian mimic, gaining protection from predators such as spider-hunting wasps.

Aggressive mimicry of ants by spiders. The ant is both the model and the dupe, and it becomes the spider's prey.
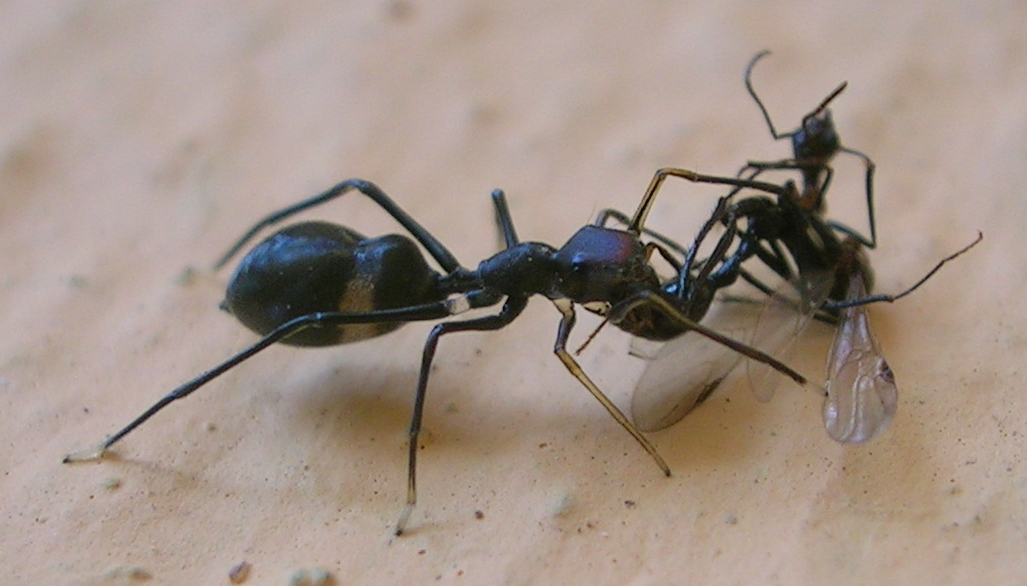
Aggressive mimic with model/dupe/prey:
Myrmarachne spider eating a queen ant

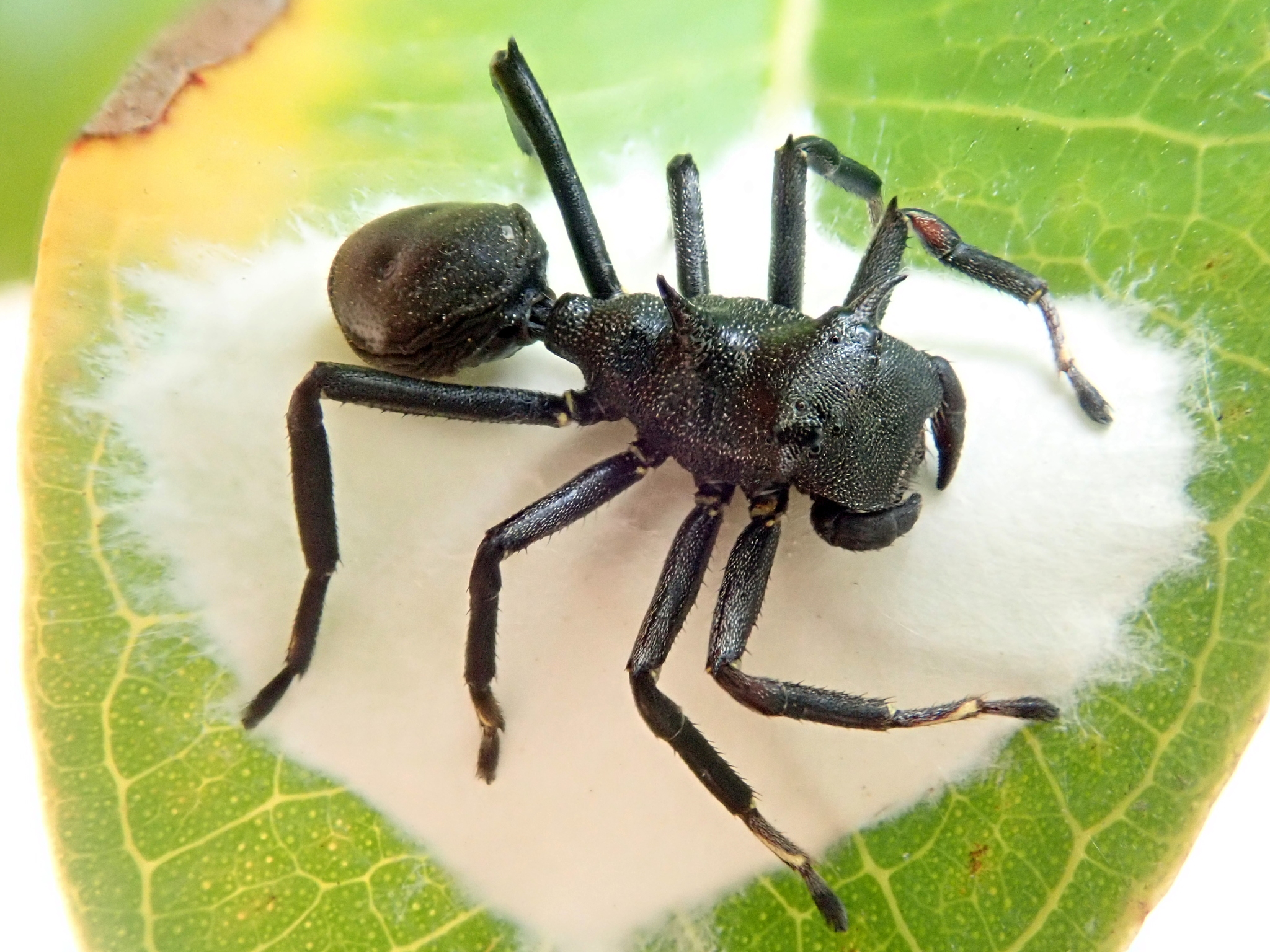
Both aggressive and Batesian mimicry:
Aphantochilus rogersi
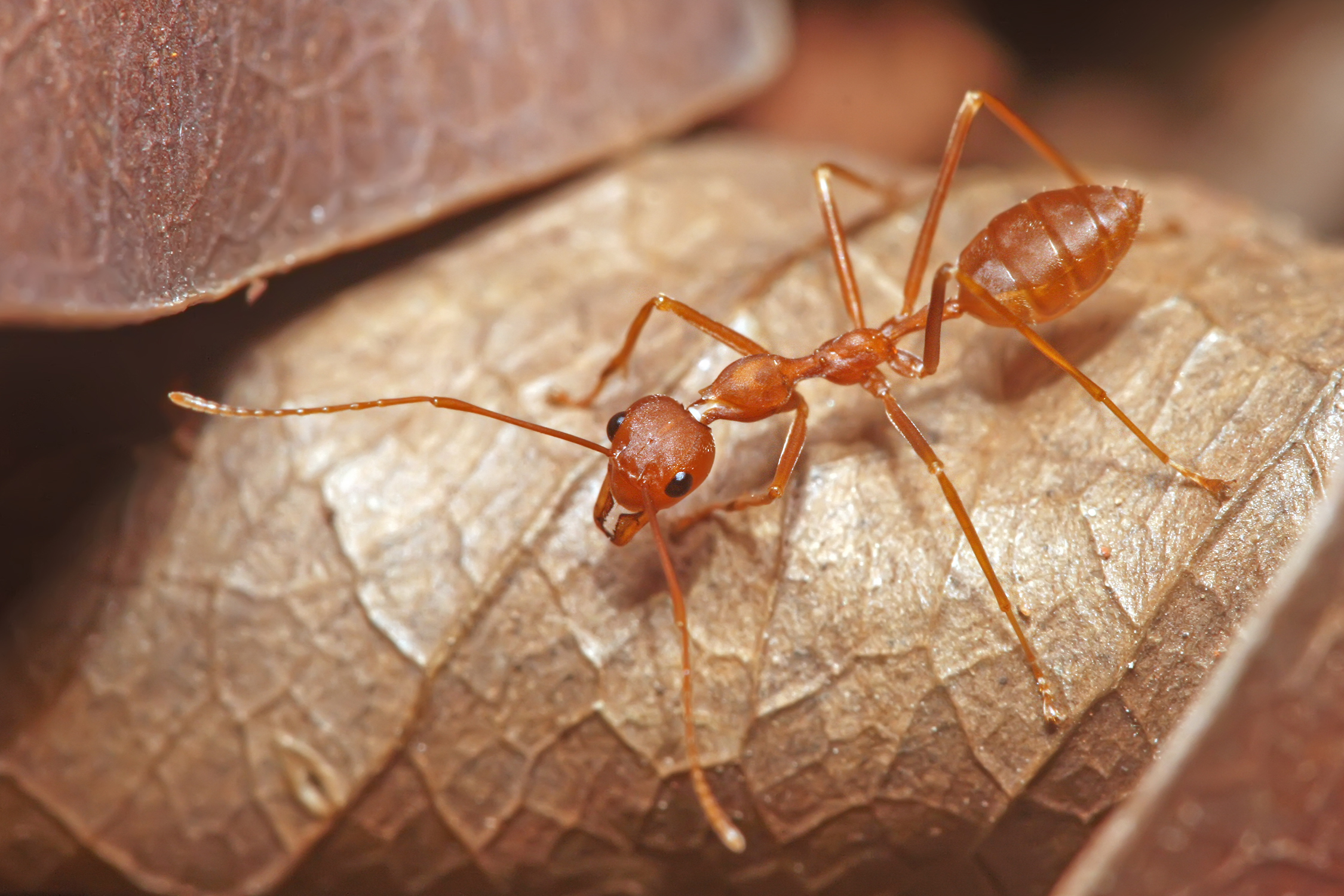
Model: Red weaver ant,
Oecophylla smaragdina

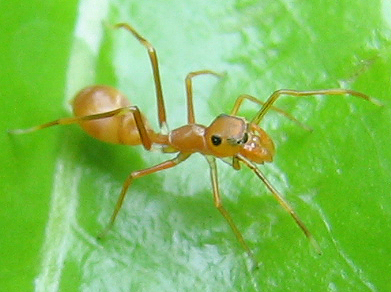
Mimic: Female Myrmarachne plataleoides resembles worker red weaver ant.

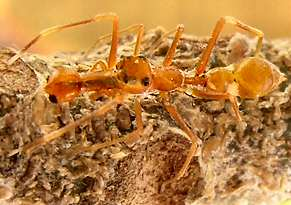
Mimic: Male M. plataleoides resembles one red weaver ant worker carrying another.

=== Special protection for young insects ===
Multiple groups of insects have evolved ant mimicry for their young, while their adults are protected in different ways, either being camouflaged or have conspicuous warning coloration.

The young instars of some mantids, such as Odontomantis pulchra and Tarachodes afzelii are Batesian mimics of ants. Bigger instars and adults of these mantids are not ant mimics, but are well-camouflaged predators, and in the case of Tarachodes, that eat ants.

Young instars of some bush crickets in the genus Macroxiphus, have an "uncanny resemblance" to ants, extending to their black coloration, remarkably perfect antlike shape, and convincingly antlike behaviour. Their long antennae are camouflaged to appear short, being black only at the base, and they are vibrated like ant antennae. Larger instars suddenly change into typical-looking katydids, and are entirely nocturnal, while the adult has bright warning coloration.

The phasmid Extatosoma tiaratum, resembling dried thorny leaves as an adult, hatches from the egg as a replica of a Leptomyrmex ant, with a red head and black body. The long end is curled to make the body shape appear ant-like, and the movement is erratic, while the adults move differently, if at all. In some species the eggs resemble ant-dispersed (myrmecochoric) plant seeds, complete with a mimic oil body (a "capitulum"). These eggs are collected by the ants, deceived in a different way, and taken to their nests. The capitulum is removed and eaten, leaving the eggs viable.

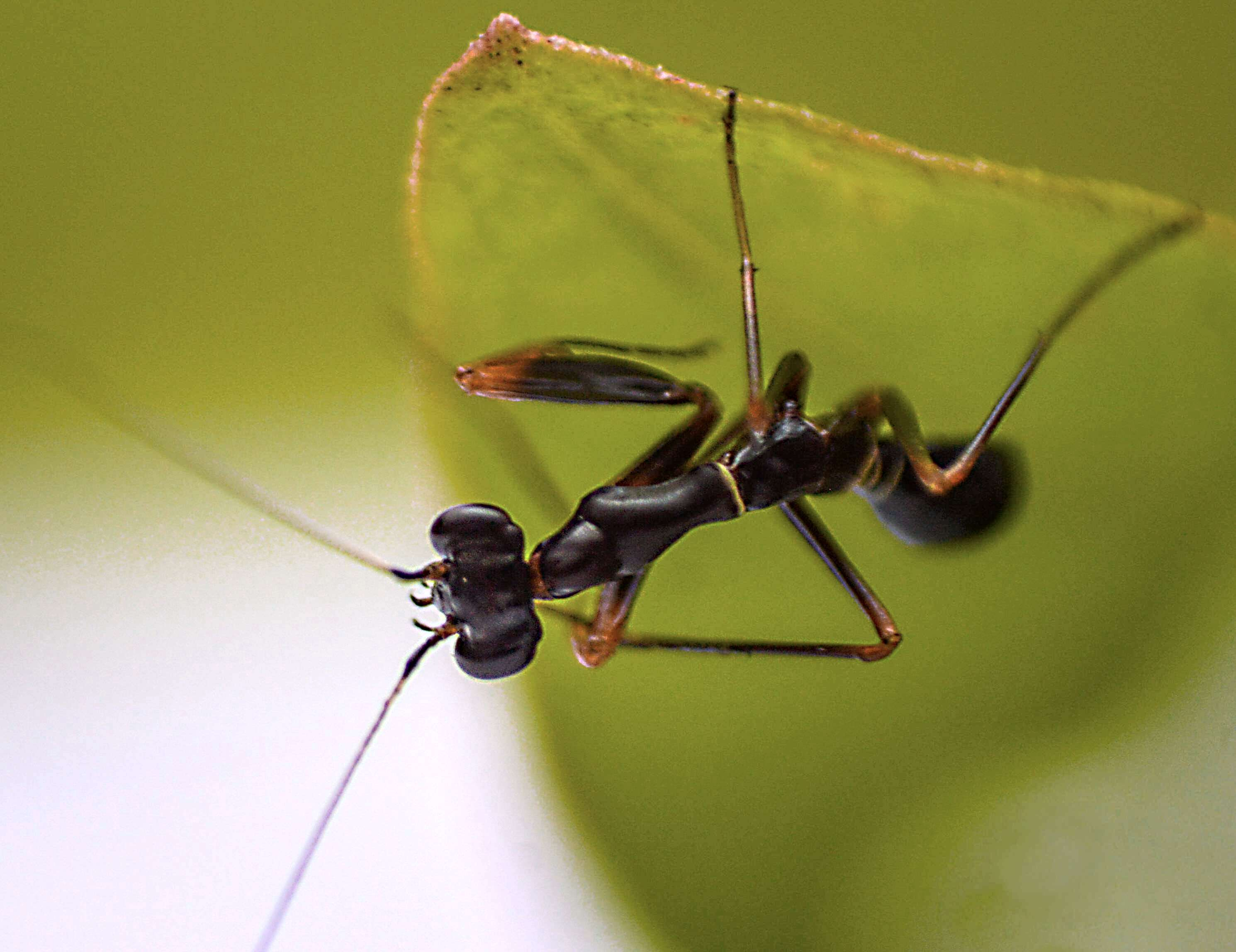
Young mantis Odontomantis pulchra is an ant mimic, unlike the cryptic adult.

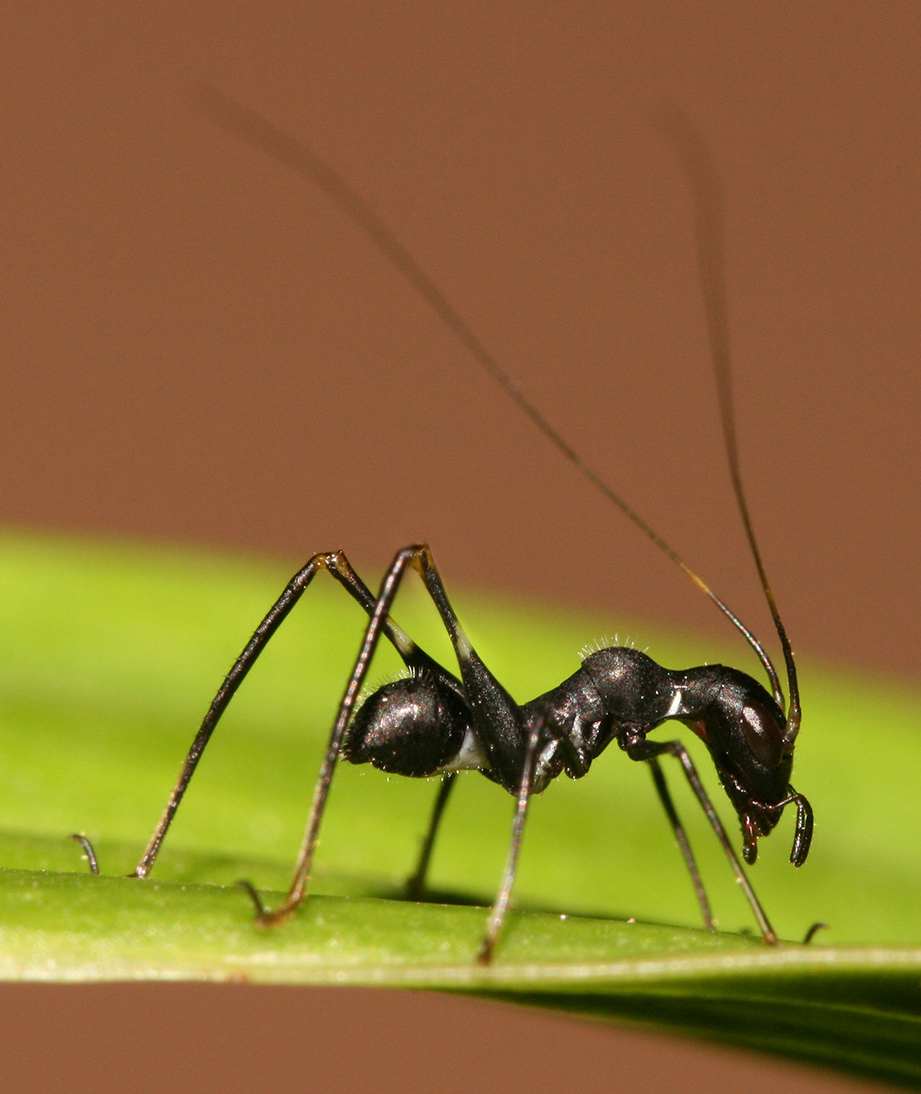
Bush cricket Macroxiphus nymph mimics ants, whereas the adult is aposematic.

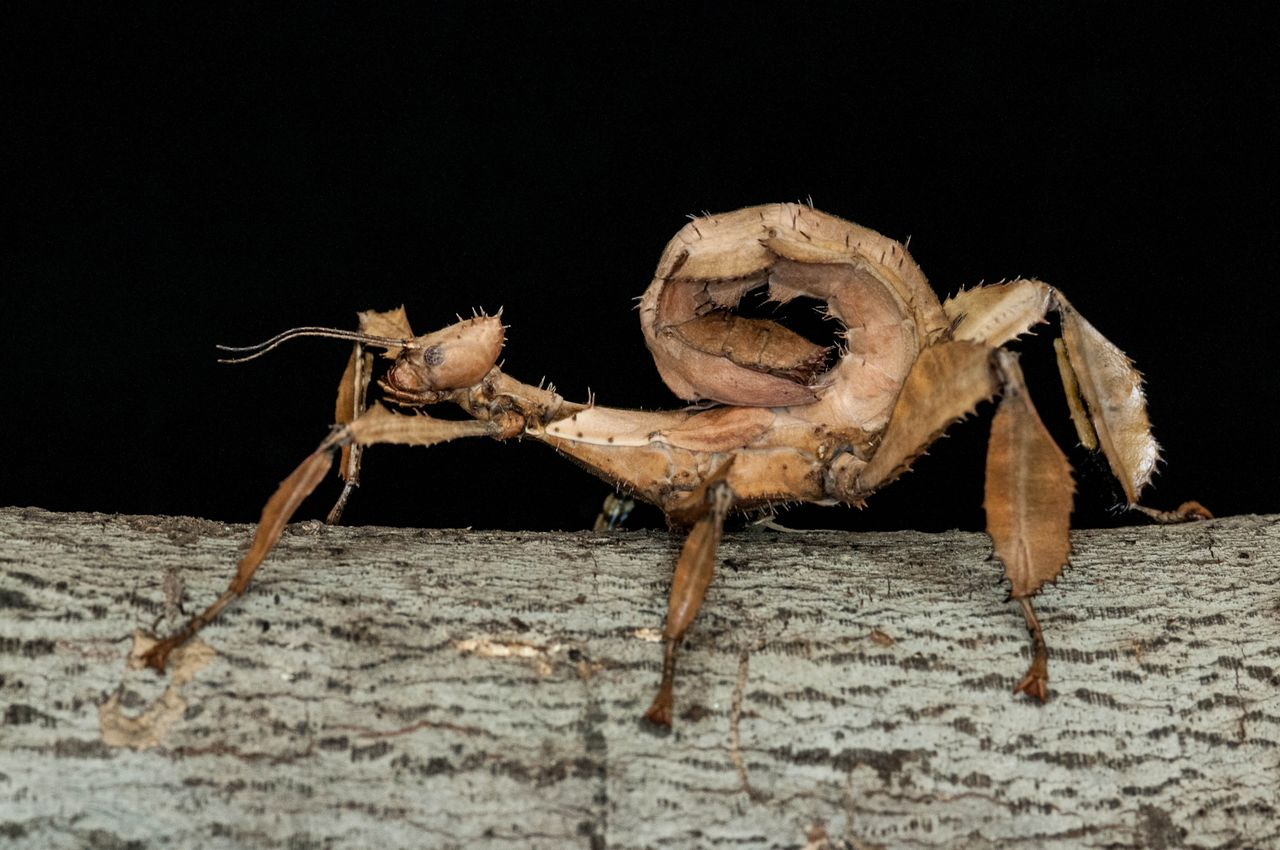
Phasmid Extatosoma tiaratum adult is a well-camouflaged plant mimic.

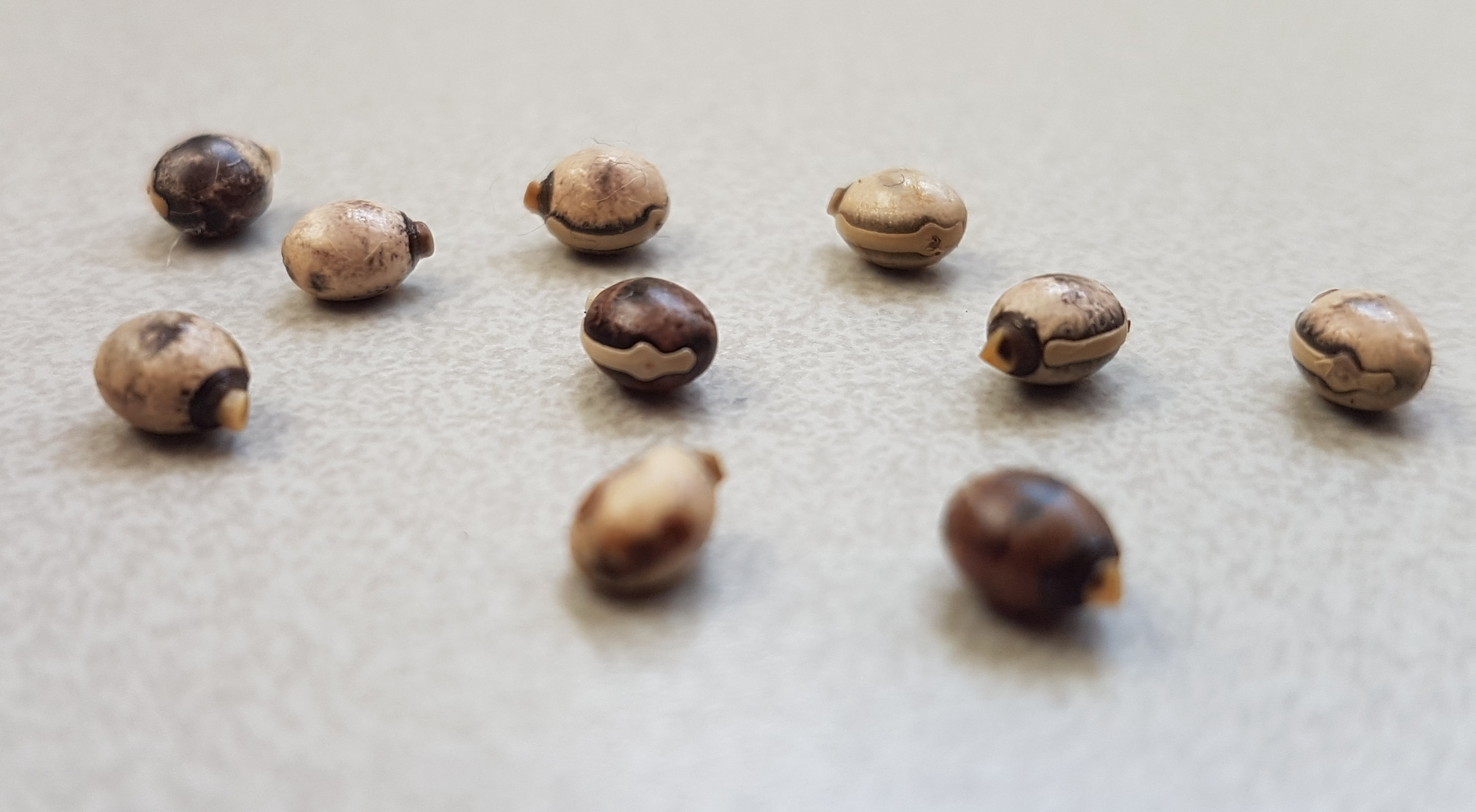
Extatosoma tiaratum eggs, mimicking ant-dispersed (myrmecochoric) plant seeds; ants bring these to their nests, eating the projecting mimic oil body, leaving the eggs viable.

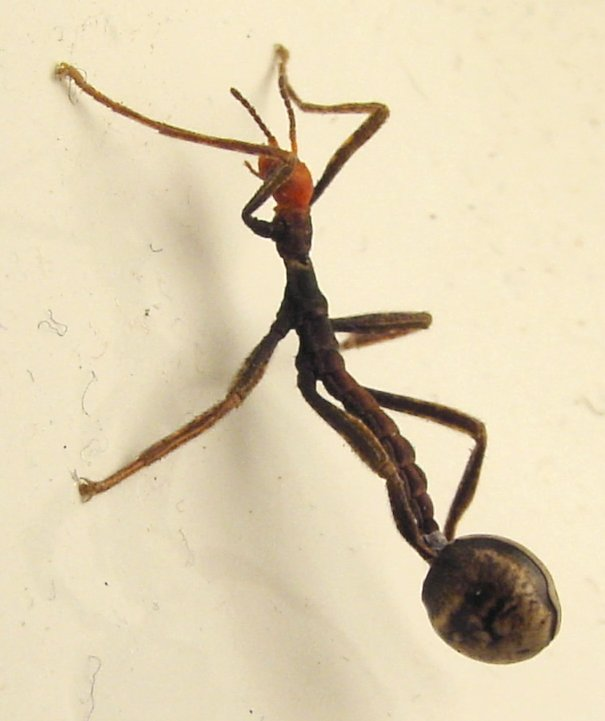
Freshly hatched Extatosoma tiaratum nymph mimics Leptomyrmex ants.

== Taxonomic range ==
Ant mimicry has a wide taxonomic range, including some 2000 species of terrestrial arthropods in more than 200 genera. It has evolved over 70 times, including some 15 clades of spiders, 10 clades of plant-sucking bugs, and 7 clades of staphylinid rove beetles. Outside the arthropods, ant mimics include snails, snakes, and flowering plants.

- Eukaryotes
  - Animals
    - Molluscs
      Snails
    - - Arthropods
        - Arachnida
          - Spiders
          - Mites
        - Mandibulata
          - Millipedes
          - Pancrustaceans
            - Isopods
            - Insects
              - Polyneoptera
                - - Crickets
                  - - Stick insects
                    - Mantises
              - Eumetabola
                - Paraneoptera
                  - True bugs
                  - Thrips
                - Holometabola
                  - - Parasitoid wasps
                    - Beetles
                  - - Butterfly larvae
                    - Flies
      - Vertebrates
        Snakes
  - Plants
    Passiflora
