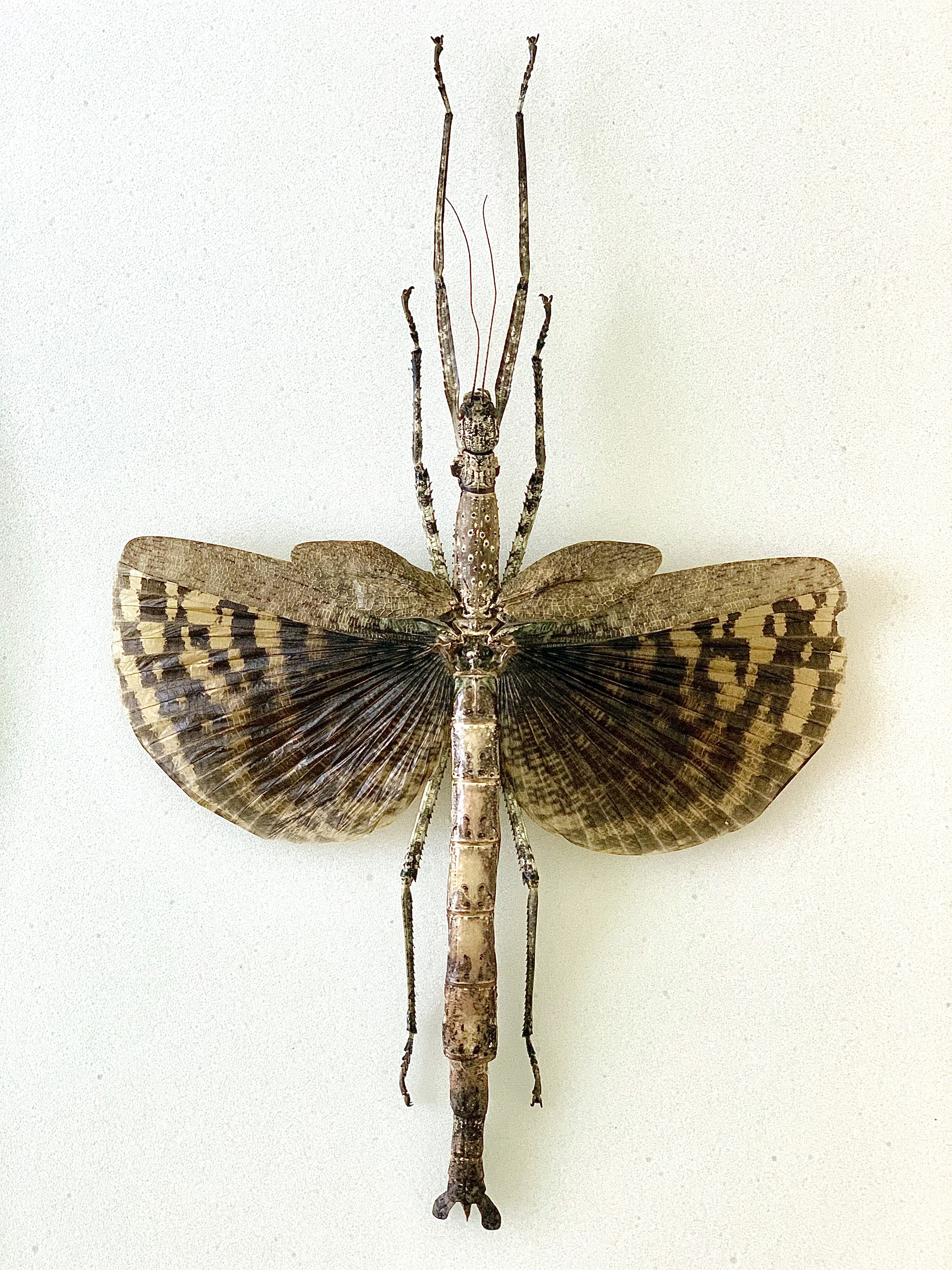

Scientific classification
- Domain: Eukaryota
- Kingdom: Animalia
- Phylum: Arthropoda
- Class: Insecta
- Order: Phasmatodea
- Family: Phasmatidae
- Subfamily: Phasmatinae
- Tribe: Phasmatini
- Genus: Phasma
- Species: P. gigas

Binomial name
- Phasma gigas (Linnaeus, 1758)

Synonyms
- Cyphocrana bauvoisi (Audinet-Serville, 1831); Cyphocrana beauvoisi (Audinet-Serville, 1831); Phasma empusa Lichtenstein, 1796

= Phasma gigas =

Species of insect

Phasma gigas is a large-sized stick insect found in Maluku Islands, Gorong Islands and Kei Islands. It is often believed that Phasma gigas is present on New Guinea, but in fact, all New Guinean records actually refer to Phasma reinwardtii. Furthermore, the historic records from Sulawesi are doubtful and need more evaluation.
