= Anchiale marmorata =

Scientific classification
- Domain: Eukaryota
- Kingdom: Animalia
- Phylum: Arthropoda
- Class: Insecta
- Order: Phasmatodea
- Family: Phasmatidae
- Subfamily: Phasmatinae
- Tribe: Phasmatini
- Genus: Anchiale
- Species: A. marmorata

Binomial name
- Anchiale marmorata (Redtenbacher, 1908)

Species of insect

Anchiale marmorata is a medium-sized stick insect found in Papua New Guinea. This species is very similar to A. modesta but females are smaller in size and have shorter legs.
