= Anchiale simplex =

Scientific classification
- Domain: Eukaryota
- Kingdom: Animalia
- Phylum: Arthropoda
- Class: Insecta
- Order: Phasmatodea
- Family: Phasmatidae
- Subfamily: Phasmatinae
- Tribe: Phasmatini
- Genus: Anchiale
- Species: A. simplex

Binomial name
- Anchiale simplex (Redtenbacher, 1908)

Species of insect

Anchiale simplex is a medium-sized stick insect. The existence of this species is questionable. It was described from a single female from French Polynesia in the Museum of Natural History of Vienna, but close examination by entomologist, Frank Hennemann, of the holotype in the Museo Civico di Storia Naturale revealed this species to be too similar to Anchiale stolli from the Bismarck Archipelago and Solomon Islands. Further research is needed.
