= Anchiale maculata =

Scientific classification
- Domain: Eukaryota
- Kingdom: Animalia
- Phylum: Arthropoda
- Class: Insecta
- Order: Phasmatodea
- Family: Phasmatidae
- Subfamily: Phasmatinae
- Tribe: Phasmatini
- Genus: Anchiale
- Species: A. maculata

Binomial name
- Anchiale maculata (Olivier, 1792)

Synonyms
- Mantis cylindrica (Gmelin, 1789); Phasma naevium (Lichtenstein, 1802); Phasma necydaloides (Stoll, 1813)

Species of insect

Anchiale maculata is a medium-sized stick insect found on the Maluku Islands, Peleng Island and Kei Islands. Anchiale maculata was first described by Oliver in 1792 as Mantis maculata. The genus Anchiale was introduced by Stål (1875) with the type species Anchiale maculata.

== Description ==
Anchiale maculata are geenish-brown in color. Females are 170 mm (6.7 in) - 198 mm (7.8 in) and males are about 120 mm (4.7 in) long. Both sexes have fully developed wings but only males are capable of flying. Anchiale maculata exhibits considerable variations, including size, coloration, and body features, depending on which island it inhabits. For example, a female specimen from Morotai was much darker than those examined from Ambelau, Halmahera, and Seram.
