= Anchiale buruense =

Scientific classification
- Domain: Eukaryota
- Kingdom: Animalia
- Phylum: Arthropoda
- Class: Insecta
- Order: Phasmatodea
- Family: Phasmatidae
- Subfamily: Phasmatinae
- Tribe: Phasmatini
- Genus: Anchiale
- Species: A. buruense

Binomial name
- Anchiale buruense Hennemann, Conle & Suzuki, 2015

Species of insect

Anchiale buruense is a medium-sized stick insect found in Buru of the Maluku Islands, Indonesia.

== Description ==
Anchiale buruense are geenish-brown. Females are about 160 mm (6.3 in) long and males are about 100 mm (3.9 in) long. Both sexes have a pair of wings.
