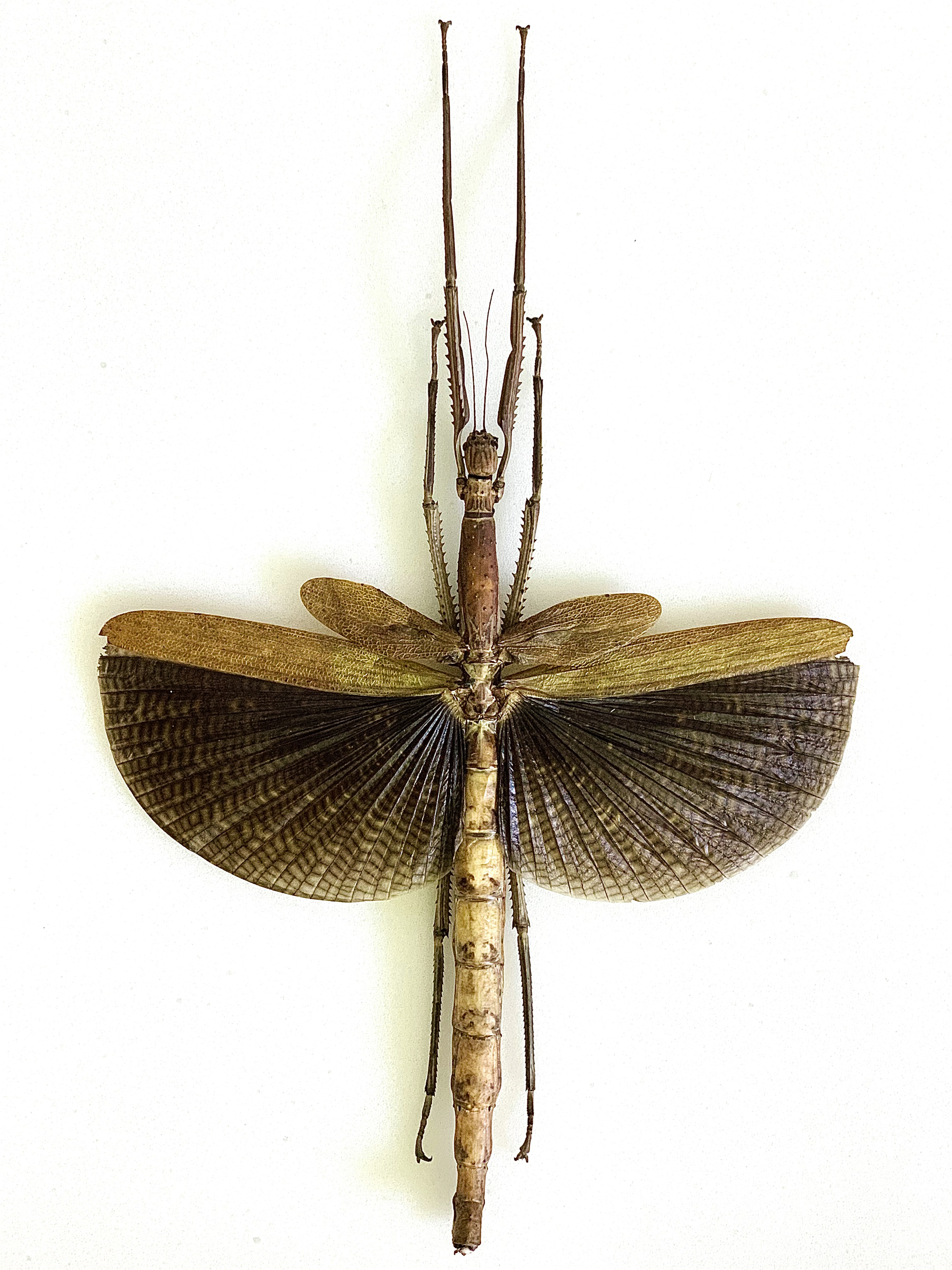
- Anchiale modesta specimen from the private collection of Andrew Markey

Scientific classification
- Kingdom: Animalia
- Phylum: Arthropoda
- Clade: Pancrustacea
- Class: Insecta
- Order: Phasmatodea
- Family: Phasmatidae
- Subfamily: Phasmatinae
- Tribe: Phasmatini
- Genus: Anchiale
- Species: A. modesta

Binomial name
- Anchiale modesta Redtenbacher, 1908

= Anchiale modesta =

Species of insect

Anchiale modesta is a medium-sized stick insect from Papua New Guinea.
