= Blackburn Island =

Island of New South Wales, Australia

Coordinates: 31.535°S 159.060°E

Blackburn Island is to the west of Lord Howe Island

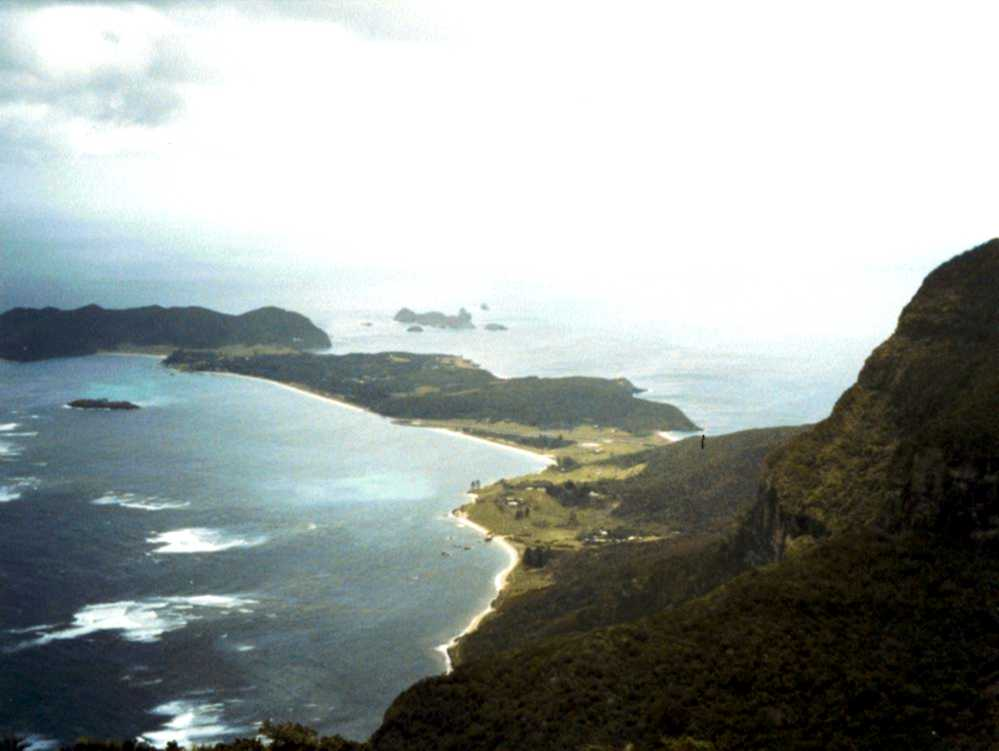
View over Lord Howe from Mount Gower, looking north, with Blackburn Island the islet in the lagoon on the left

Blackburn Island, also known locally as Rabbit Island, is a small uninhabited island in the lagoon of Lord Howe Island in the Tasman Sea. It has an area of 2.4 ha ( 5.94 acres ), a maximum height of 32 m and lies some 700 m off the west coast of Lord Howe within the waters of the Lord Howe Island Marine Park. It is vegetated mainly with grasses, and is extensively covered with the breeding burrows of wedge-tailed shearwaters. It is easily accessible by kayak from Lord Howe.

As of 2023 plans were being made to reintroduce the Lord Howe Island stick insect, which had only survived on Ball's Pyramid, to Blackburn to test the potential for reintroduction to the main island.
