= Land lobster =

Land lobster may mean:

- The Lord Howe Island stick insect: Dryococelus australis
- Bulkier members of the Phasmatodea (stick & leaf insects) in general
- Whip scorpion/vinegaroon: Uropygi
