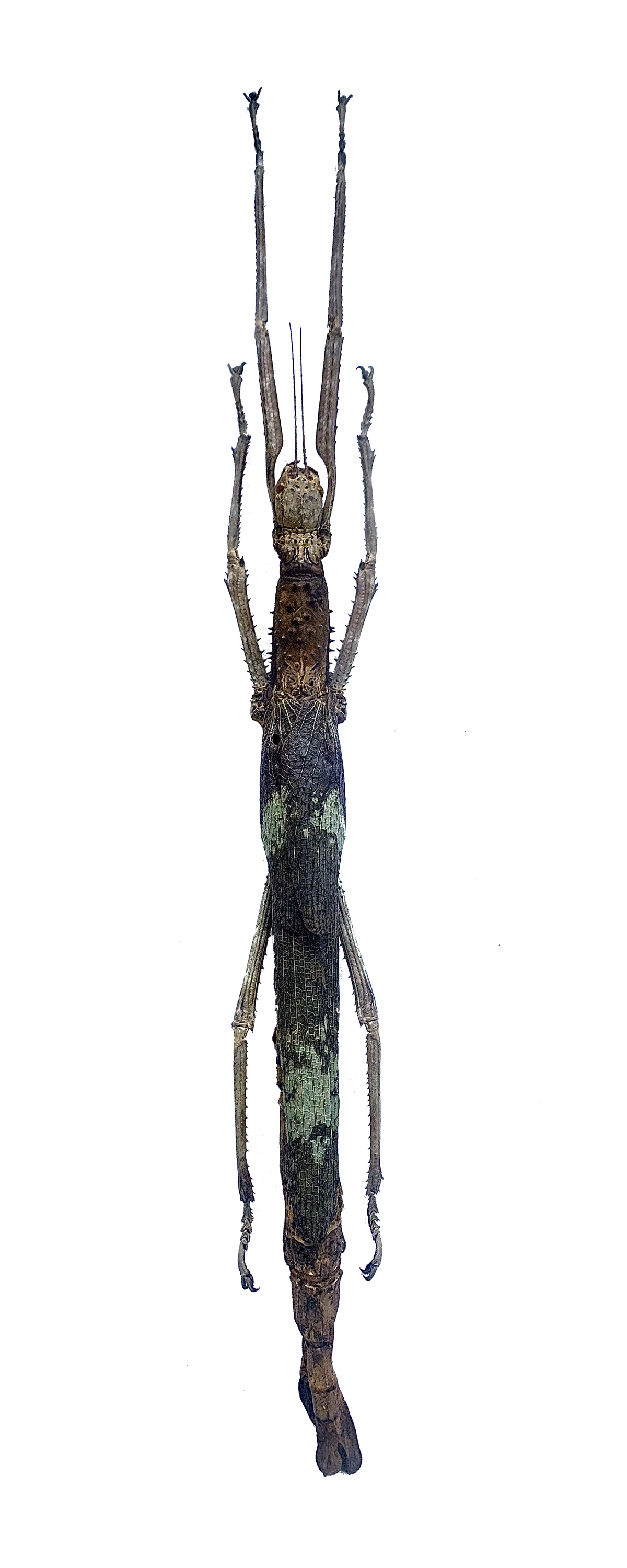
- Phasma reinwardtii specimen from the private collection of Andrew Markey

Scientific classification
- Domain: Eukaryota
- Kingdom: Animalia
- Phylum: Arthropoda
- Class: Insecta
- Order: Phasmatodea
- Family: Phasmatidae
- Subfamily: Phasmatinae
- Tribe: Phasmatini
- Genus: Phasma
- Species: P. reinwardtii

Binomial name
- Phasma reinwardtii de Haan, 1842

Synonyms
- Cyphocrania maclayi (Macleay), 1884); Papuanoidea straeleni (Werner), 1930)

= Phasma reinwardtii =

Species of insect

Phasma reinwardtii is a large stick insect found in West Papua and Papua New Guinea.
