= John Davis (filmmaker) =

John Davis (c. 1944 – 7 November 2015) was an Australian documentary filmmaker, mountaineer, television producer, chemist, and member of the Greens. On 14 February 1965, Davis, together with Bryden Allen, Jack Pettigrew and David Witham, became the first climbers to reach the summit of Ball's Pyramid, the world's tallest volcano stack. Davis made more than 100 twenty minute programs, focusing primarily on chemistry and physics, for the Australian Broadcasting Corporation beginning in 1966. He was also the former producer of the long running Behind the News for approximately two and a half years. He left ABC in 1984 to start an educational video company, Classroom Video, which he and his wife, Felicity, owned and operated until 2005.

== Background and early career ==
Davis received a Bachelor of Science from the University of New South Wales. In 1960, he was hired by CSR Limited, based in Sydney. He researched construction materials and sugar refining at CSR from 1960 until 1966.

In February 1965, he and an Australian team became the first persons to successfully scale Ball's Pyramid, a volcano stack located in the Pacific Ocean.

== Film-making career ==
Davis joined the Australian Broadcasting Corporation (ABC) in 1966 as an education television producer. Between 1966 and 1984, he made more than 100 short television programs, most of which were 20-minute pieces focusing of chemistry and physics. He also produced ABC's news program, Behind The News, for two and a half years. In addition to his work at ABC, Davis was a partner of Expedition Films. The production company made five films covering Papua New Guinea, including director Michael Pearce's People of the Warm Mud Mountains, which won the Sydney Film Festival Documentary Prize. Another of Expedition Films' productions, Cats Among the Coral, which Davis co-directed with Gary Steer, followed a catamaran from Port Douglas, Queensland, to Indonesia. Davis also documented a climb of Ball's Pyramid.

Davis simultaneously remained a chemist, focusing on environmental science, while working at ABC. He commissioned a gas plant and developed a sewage treatment plant in Humphries and Glasgow in 1973. He also set up the Good Oil Company waste oil recycling program in 1975. Davis spent 12-months as a research director in Canada in 1979 researching the extraction of energy from biomass.

In 1984, Davis left ABC. He and his wife, Felicity, established a production company, Classroom Video. They oversaw the production of more than 400 films and videos, and sold more than one million videos to twenty thousand schools. Classroom Video had forty employees with offices in Australia, China, France, New Zealand, the United Kingdom and the United States at the company's height. The Davises sold Classroom Video and its portfolio to Video Education Australia in 2005. They then moved to a new production company called Science Films.

== Latter career ==
Davis stood as a Greens candidate for Davidson in the 2011 New South Wales state election, but was not elected. His wife was also a Green candidate in Pittwater.

On 7 November 2015, John Davis, together with Richard and Carolyn Green, a husband and wife businessman and graphic artist respectively, were killed in a helicopter crash in Watagans National Park near Martinsville in the Hunter Valley. Davis was 71 years old. Reports suggest that the trio, who were active with The Greens, were filming environmental damage surrounding the Whitehaven Coal mine at Werris Creek at the time of the crash.
