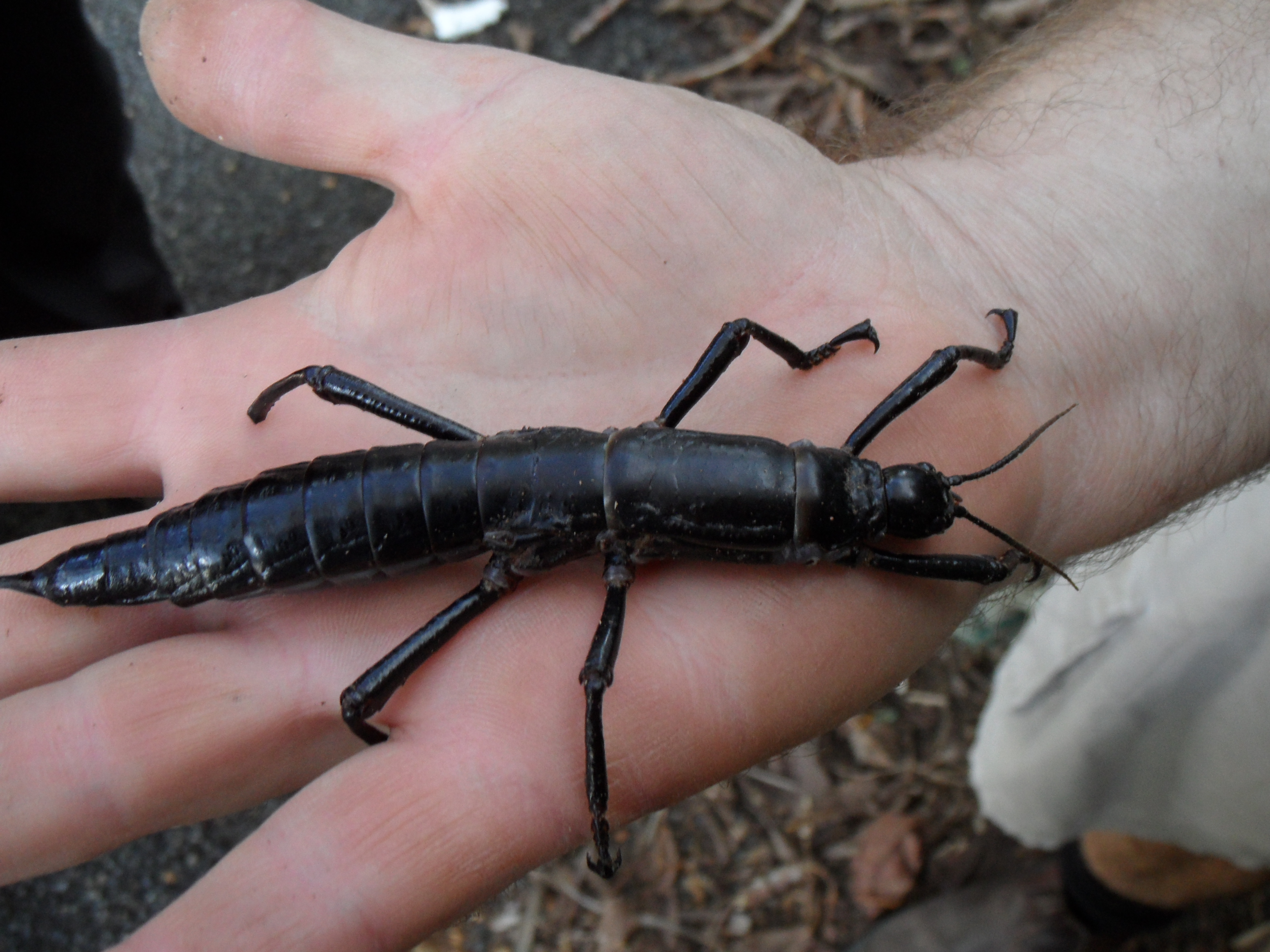
- Live specimen

Conservation status
- Critically Endangered (IUCN 3.1)

Scientific classification
- Kingdom: Animalia
- Phylum: Arthropoda
- Clade: Pancrustacea
- Class: Insecta
- Order: Phasmatodea
- Family: Phasmatidae
- Subfamily: Phasmatinae
- Tribe: Phasmatini
- Genus: Dryococelus; Gurney, 1947
- Species: D. australis

Binomial name
- Dryococelus australis (Montrouzier, 1855)

= Dryococelus =

Dryococelus australis

Species of stick insect

Dryococelus australis, also known as the Lord Howe Island stick insect, Lord Howe Island phasmid or, locally, as the tree lobster, is a species of stick insect that lives in the Lord Howe Island Group. It is the only member of the monotypic genus Dryococelus. Thought to be extinct by 1920, it was rediscovered in 2001. Although it had been extirpated from Lord Howe itself, a remnant population of 24 individuals was rediscovered on the sea stack of Ball's Pyramid. The species has been called "the rarest insect in the world".

== Anatomy and behaviour ==
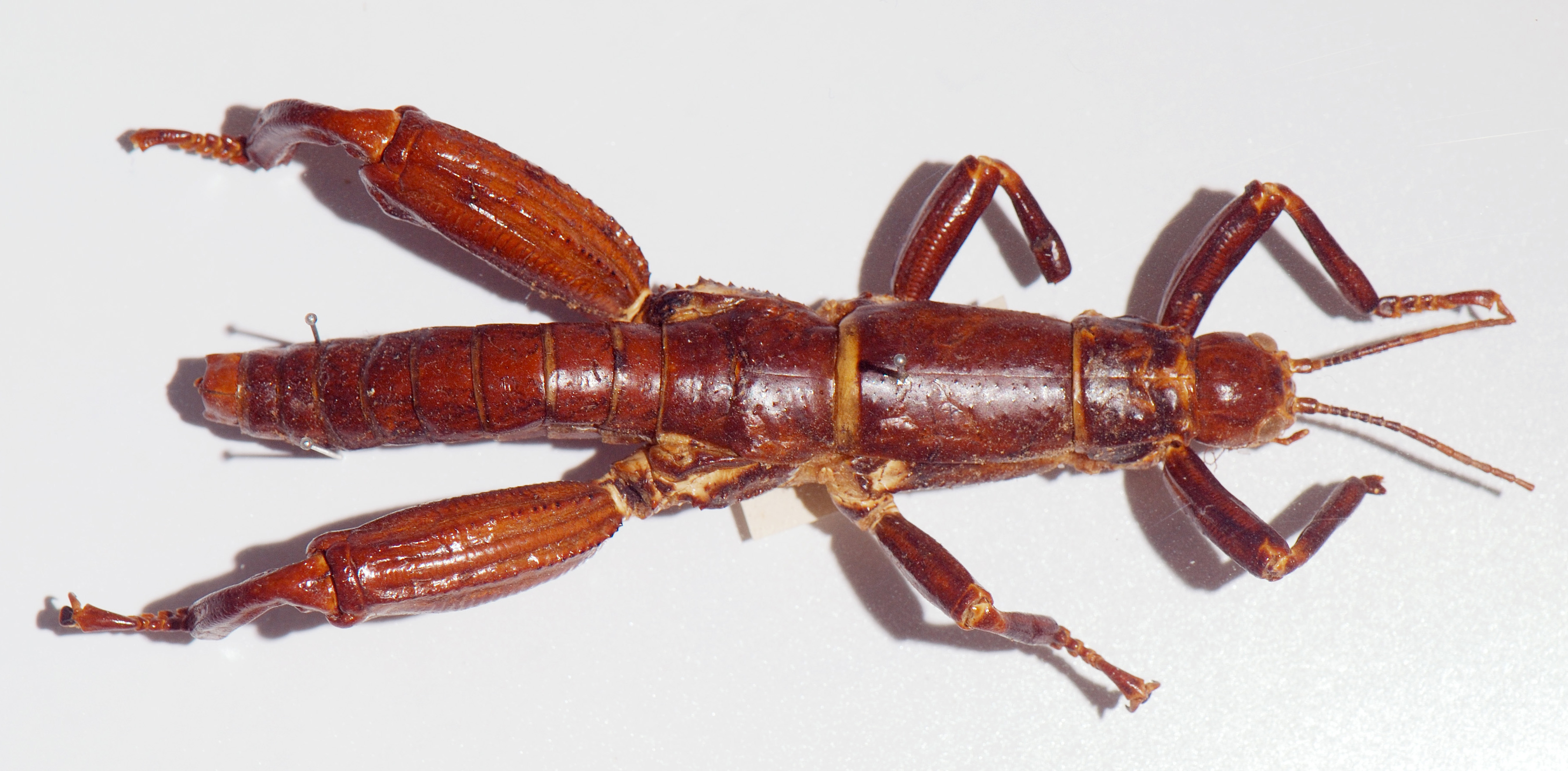
Museum specimen

Adult Lord Howe Island stick insects can measure up to 20 centimetres (8 in) in length and weigh 25 grams (1 oz), with males 25% smaller than females. They are oblong in shape and have sturdy legs. Males have thicker thighs than females. Unlike most phasmida, the insects have no wings.

The behaviour of this stick insect is highly unusual for an insect species, in that the males and females form a bond in some pairs. The females lay eggs while hanging from branches. Hatching can happen up to nine months later. The nymphs are first bright green and active during the day, but as they mature, they turn black and become nocturnal.

Reproduction can happen without the presence of males (parthenogenesis) and this quality has allowed the species to survive when they are low in numbers.

== Extinction ==
The stick insects were once very common on Lord Howe Island, where they were used as bait in fishing. They were believed to have become extinct soon after the supply ship SS Makambo ran aground on the island in 1918, allowing black rats to become established. After 1920, no stick insects could be found. The species was declared extinct.

== Rediscovery ==
In 1964, a team of climbers visiting Ball's Pyramid, a rocky sea stack 23 kilometres (14 mi) south-east of Lord Howe, discovered a dead stick insect. In subsequent years, climbers found a few more fresh carcasses, but expeditions to find live specimens were unsuccessful. In 2001, Australian scientists David Priddel and Nicholas Carlile hypothesised that there was sufficient vegetation on the islet to support a population of the insects, and, with two assistants, travelled there to investigate further. They scaled 120 metres of grassy, low-angled slope, but found only crickets. On their descent, the team discovered large insect droppings under a single Melaleuca shrub growing in a crevice approximately 100 metres above the shoreline. They deduced that they would need to return after dark, when the insects are active, to have the best chance of finding living specimens. Carlile returned with local ranger Dean Hiscox and, with a camera and flashlights, scrambled back up the slopes. They discovered a small population of 24 insects living beneath the Melaleuca shrub amongst a substantial build-up of plant debris.

In 2003, a research team from New South Wales National Parks and Wildlife Service returned to Ball's Pyramid and collected two breeding pairs, one destined for a private breeder in Sydney and the other sent to the Melbourne Zoo.

== Conservation ==
After initial difficulties, the insects were successfully bred in captivity in Melbourne. The ultimate goal was to produce a large population for reintroduction to Lord Howe Island, provided that a project to eradicate the invasive rats was successful. In 2006, the captive population of insects numbered about 50 individuals, with thousands of eggs still to hatch. In 2008, when Jane Goodall visited the zoo, the population had grown to 11,376 eggs and 700 individuals, 20 of which were soon after returned to a special habitat on Lord Howe Island. As of April 2012, the Melbourne Zoo had reportedly bred over 9,000 of the insects, including 1,000 adult insects, plus 20,000 eggs.

In 2012, the Budapest Zoo was the first zoo outside of Australia to reproduce the insects.

In 2014, an unauthorised climbing team sighted live stick insects near the summit of Ball's Pyramid, in a thicket of sedge plants rooted in very thin soils at an altitude of 500 metres, suggesting that the insect's range on the island is more widespread than previously thought, and that its food preferences are not limited to Melaleuca howeana.

By the beginning of 2016, Melbourne Zoo had hatched 13,000 eggs, and had also sent eggs to the Bristol Zoo in England, the San Diego Zoo in the United States, and the Toronto Zoo in Canada, to establish distinct insurance populations.

In 2018, it was announced that the CEO of the Lord Howe Island Board had approved a plan to exterminate the black rat population on Lord Howe Island to protect the island ecology and potentially reintroduce D. australis. As of 2023, plans are being made to reintroduce the insects to Blackburn Island, an islet in the Lord Howe lagoon, to test the potential for reintroduction to the larger island.

In 2025, the Prague Zoo joined the conservation program. The zoo became the sixth institution in the world to create living conditions for D. australis and the third to put them on display. The new "Ball's Pyramid exhibit" also includes greenhouses and garden beds for cultivating the plants used to feed the insects. Prague Zoo has successfully bred the insects for the first time in February 2026.

== Genetics ==
A 2017 study comparing DNA sequences of phasmids originating from Ball's Pyramid with those from museum specimens from Lord Howe Island showed that the Ball's Pyramid sequences differ from those of Lord Howe Island by a degree comparable to variation within the museum specimens, despite some morphological differences between the two groups. This confirms that the two populations represent the same species. The genome was found to be very large in size (over 4 Gb) and is probably hexaploid.

== See also ==
- Giant wētā
- Lazarus taxon
- Threatened fauna of Australia
