= Vision, Touch and Hearing Research Centre =

Australian research centre

Coordinates: 27°29′47″S 153°00′46″E

The Vision Touch and Hearing Research Centre (VTHRC, 1988–2007) was the first Commonwealth Special Research Centre to be awarded to the University of Queensland. Located on the St. Lucia campus of the University of Queensland, Brisbane, Australia, the VTHRC was headed by Prof. Jack Pettigrew FRS, FAAS.

The core research conducted at the VTHRC involved the use of sensory systems as models for understanding brain function and neuronal plasticity. Other major research themes included neuronal death and neuroprotection, the evolution and functional adaptation of sensory systems (sensory ecology) and the brain, the neuronal basis of behaviour (neuroethology), mental health and altered states of consciousness. Throughout its first decade (1988–1998) the VTHRC's activities were centered on four 'units', each encompassing multiple lines of research: the Vision, Touch, Hearing and Comparative Neuroscience units.

In 2005, researchers at the Vision Touch and Hearing Research Centre discovered that deep-sea predators warm up their eyes during hunts which improves their vision.
