= Anchiale stolli =

Scientific classification
- Kingdom: Animalia
- Phylum: Arthropoda
- Class: Insecta
- Order: Phasmatodea
- Family: Phasmatidae
- Subfamily: Phasmatinae
- Tribe: Phasmatini
- Genus: Anchiale
- Species: A. stolli

Binomial name
- Anchiale stolli Sharp, 1898

Synonyms
- Anchiale stollii Tepper, 1903

Species of insect

Anchiale stolli is a medium-sized stick insect found in the Solomon Islands.

== Description ==
Anchiale stolli are geenish-brown in color. Females are about 195 mm (7.7 in) long and males are about 125 mm (4.9 in) long. Both sexes have fully developed wings but only males are capable of flying.
