= Dún Briste =

Sea stack in Ireland

Coordinates: 54.3276°N 9.3482°W

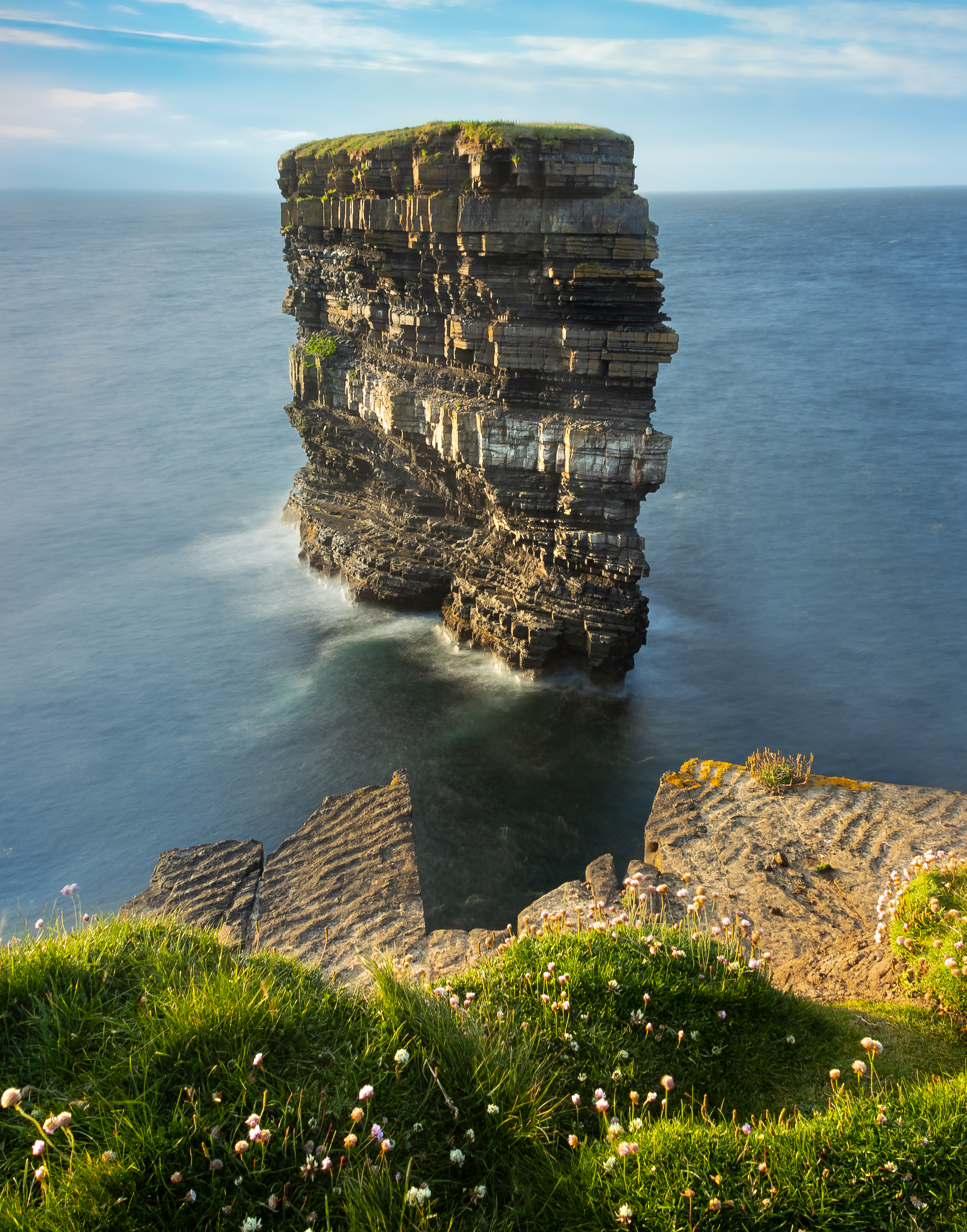
Dún Briste, Downpatrick Head

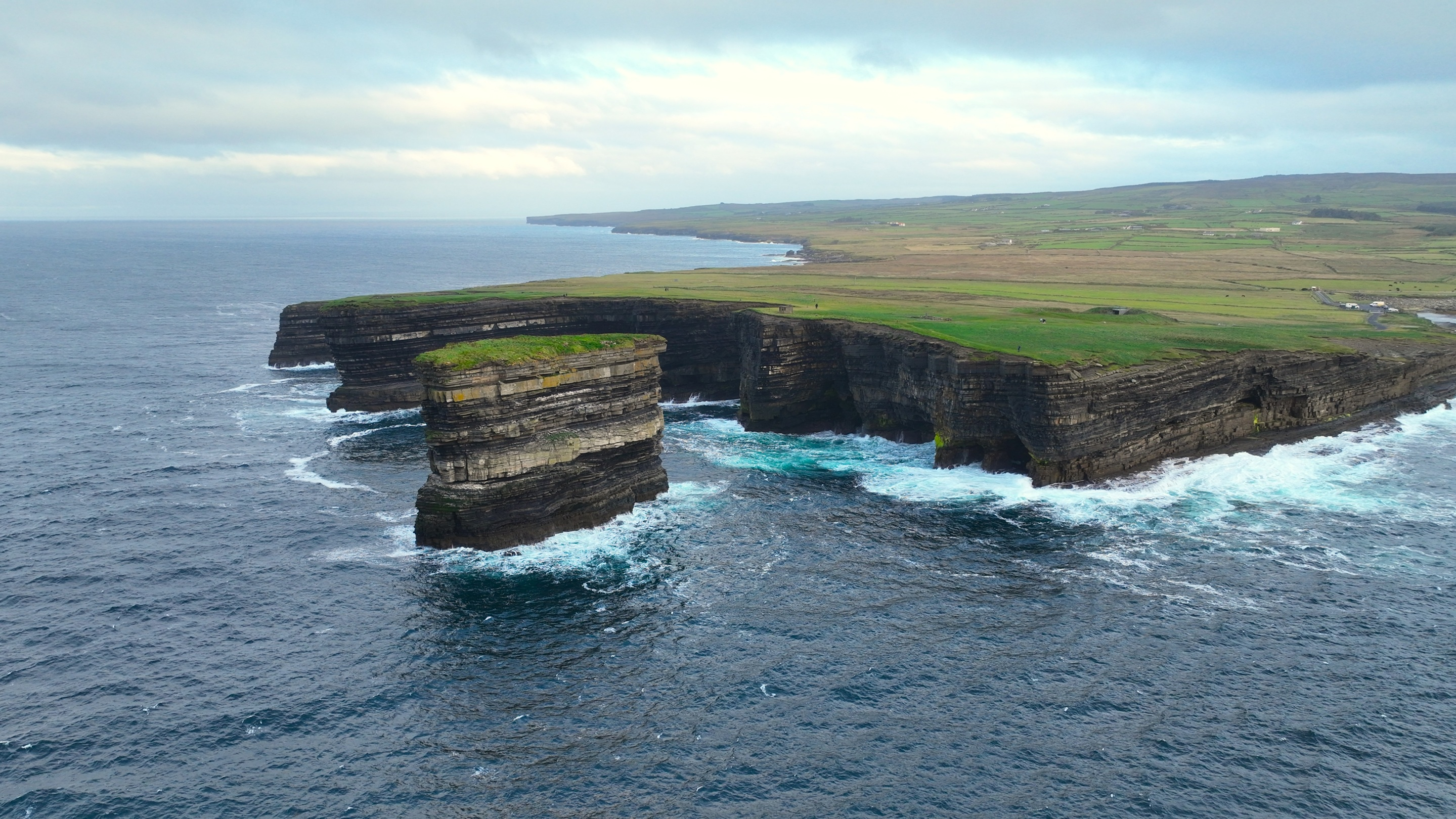
Offshore view

Dún Briste (Irish for 'broken fort') is a natural sea stack or pilaster – in geomorphology called a stack – off the western coast of Ireland in County Mayo. It consists of sedimentary strata that was deposited during the Carboniferous period, possibly Mississippian, approximately 350 million years ago.

== Etymology ==
The name comes from the Irish words dún meaning 'fort' and briste meaning 'broken', reflecting both the structure's appearance and its legendary origins.

== Description ==
The stack lies immediately off the peninsula of Downpatrick Head, six kilometres north-northeast of the town of Ballycastle. It is 45 metres high, 63 metres long, and 23 metres wide.

The stack is primarily composed of layered sedimentary rocks, including limestone, sandstone, and shale. Formed roughly 350 million years ago during the Carboniferous period, these horizontal, multi-colored strata represent ancient seabed deposits.

== History ==
According to legend, before Dún Briste was separated from its neighbouring peninsula, Downpatrick Head, Saint Patrick built one of Ireland's first churches there. The legend continues that when a local druid, Crom Dubh, refused to convert to Christianity, the angry Patrick struck the ground with his staff and cut the stack from the mainland, condemning the druid to die there in solitude. The stack is believed to have broken off from the mainland in 1393, when the arch leading to it collapsed during rough sea conditions.

During World War II the nearby house served as a lookout post for the Marine and Coastwatching Service.

Evidence that it was once part of the mainland was presented in 1980 by researchers who landed on it by helicopter and carried out surveys, where they found stone buildings and remains of sheep crossings.
