= Jack Pettigrew =

Australian neuroscientist (1943–2019)

John Douglas "Jack" Pettigrew
- Born: 2 October 1943; Wagga Wagga, Australia
- Died: 7 May 2019 (aged 75); Kempton, Tasmania, Australia
- Education: University of Sydney (MBBS)
- Spouse: Rona (m. 1968)
- Children: 3

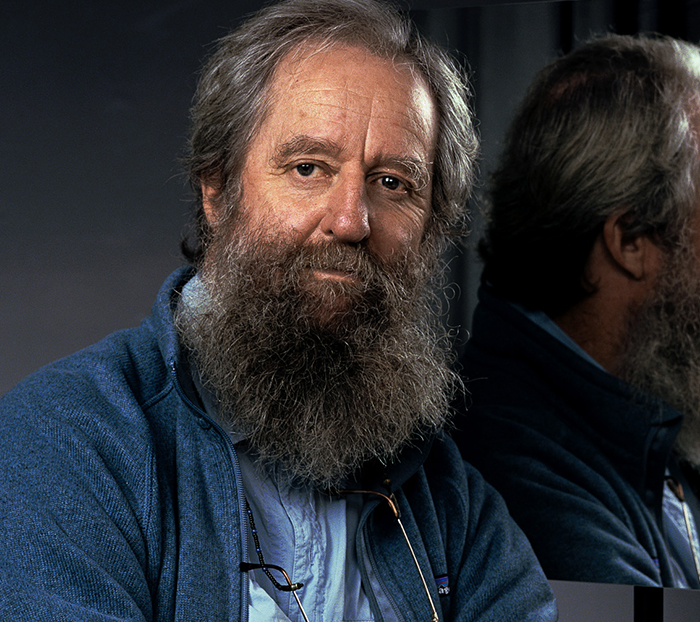

John Douglas "Jack" Pettigrew (2 October 1943 – 7 May 2019) was an Australian neuroscientist. He was an Emeritus Professor at the University of Queensland in Australia.

== Research ==
He was the chief proponent of the flying primate hypothesis, which was based on the similarity between the brains of megabats and primates.

== Honours and awards ==
Pettigrew's scientific work was recognised by several honours and awards, including becoming a Fellow of the Royal Society of London (FRS) in 1987, becoming a Fellow of the Australian Academy of Science (FAA) in the same year, and being awarded the Centenary Medal in 2001 for service to Australian society and science in phylogeny.

== Other notable activity ==
In the 1960s and 1970s, Pettigrew was an accomplished rock climber. His most notable climb came in 1965 when together with Bryden Allen, John Davis, and David Witham he was the first to climb the 562 m (1,844 ft) high Ball's Pyramid, the tallest volcanic stack in the world.
