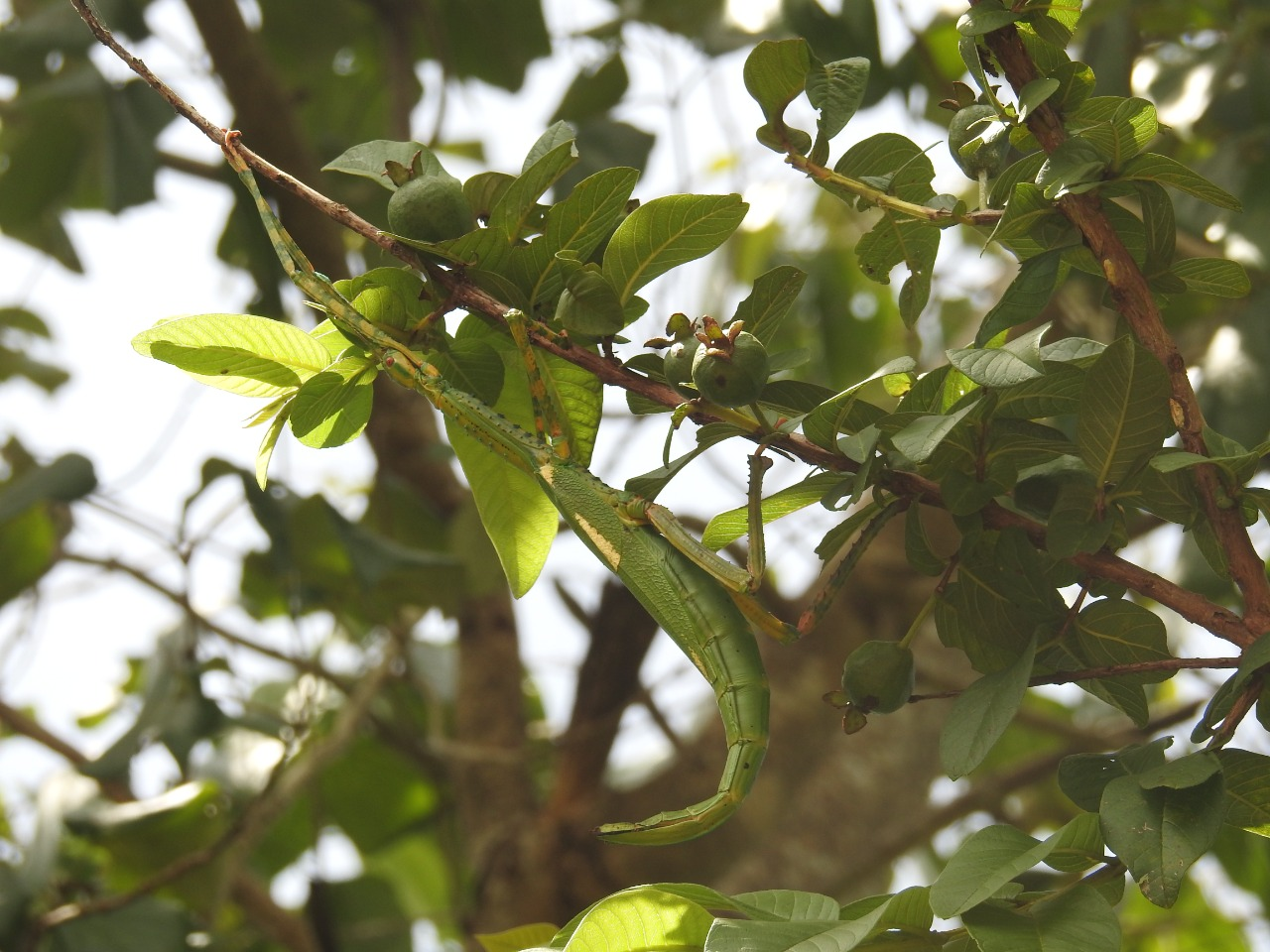
- Adult Female from West Timor

Scientific classification
- Kingdom: Animalia
- Phylum: Arthropoda
- Class: Insecta
- Order: Phasmatodea
- Family: Phasmatidae
- Genus: Eurycnema
- Species: E. versirubra

Binomial name
- Eurycnema versirubra (Audinet-Serville, 1838)

Synonyms
- Cyphocrania hanitschi (Sharp, 1898); Cyphocrania herculeana (Charpentier, 1845); Cyphocrania (Eurycnema) versifasciata (Audinet-Serville, 1838)

= Eurycnema versirubra =

Species of stick insect

Eurycnema versirubra, the red-winged green giant stick insect/Timor Giant Stick Insect, is a species of stick insect from Timor, Solor, and Wetar, The original habitat of Eurycnema versirubra might be Timor and / or closeby islands. They were most likely brought from there to Java and Malaysia, where they are known from captive bred cultures only (no known wild-caught specimens). In Timor, the Timorese greatly fear the species because they consider it to be highly poisonous. As a result, the insects are often killed by the Timorese. Contrary to common belief, the Timor Giant Stick Insect is not dangerous.

== Description ==
Females are large, winged, and green in color. They measure up to 270 mm (11 in) in body length. Males range between 130 mm (5.1 in) to 160 mm (6.3 in). Both sexes from Timor have a striking red coloration on the inside costal region of the hindwings and forewings. The largest wild female specimen ever found was from Nekamese, West Timor with a length of 280 mm (11 in) found by Davis Damaledo.

== Diet ==
In the wild this species has been recorded eating Psidium guajava, Acacia, Vachellia leucophloea, & Ziziphus mauritiana. Adult females have also been recorded eating Tamarindus indica but the specimens found on Tamarind trees are smaller in size, apparently this is not a good food plant for them. Timorese people also say that this species also eats Eucalyptus alba, although not a single specimen has been found on this tree, but it seems this information is correct because specimens in captivity in West Timor apparently also accept Eucalyptus alba & Eucalyptus urophylla as a food plant.

== Additional images ==
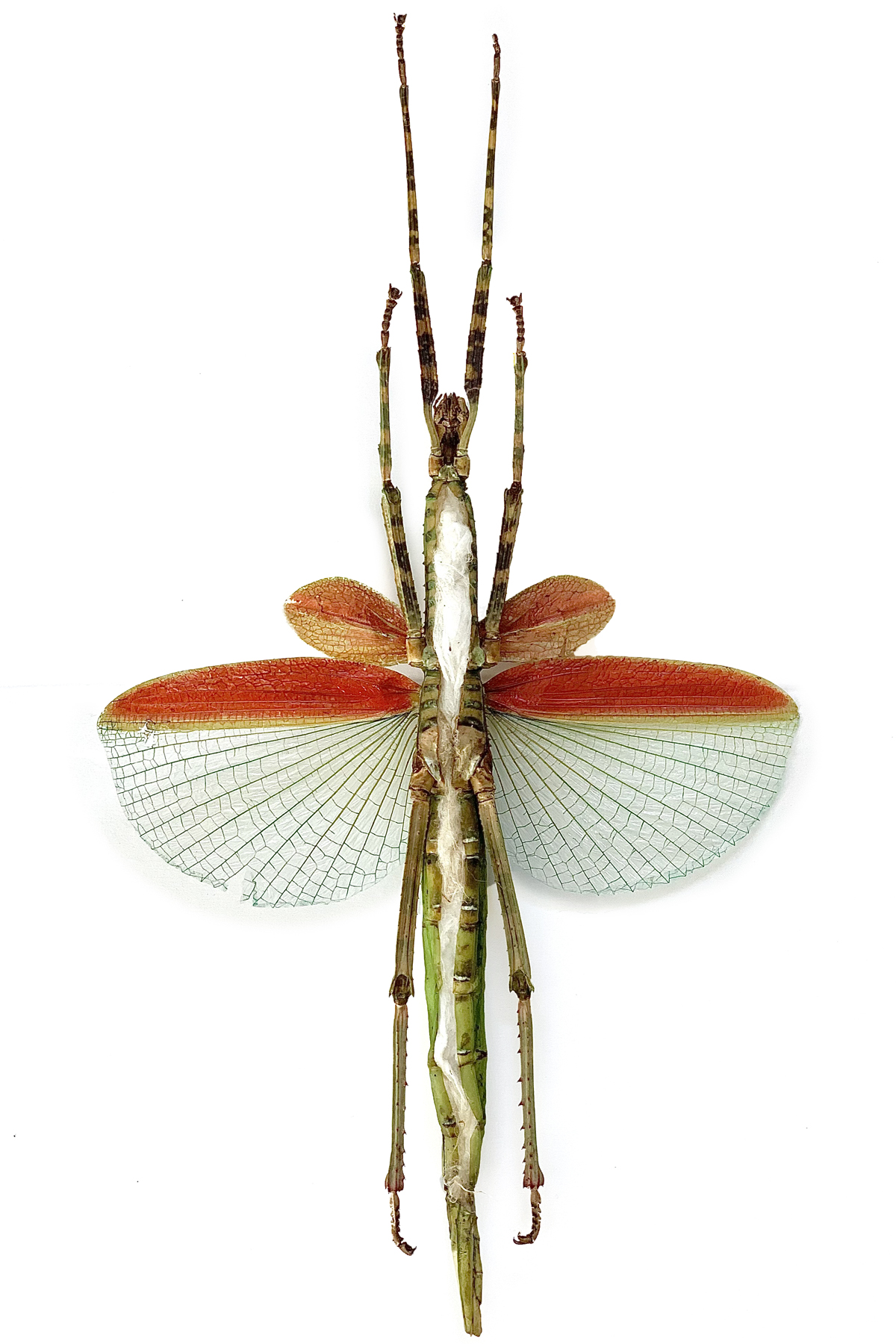
Eurycnema versirubra specimen from Timor with red inside coloration
