= Flying primate hypothesis =

Theory in evolutionary biology

In evolutionary biology, the flying primate hypothesis is that megabats, a subgroup of Chiroptera (also known as flying foxes), form an evolutionary sister group of primates. The hypothesis began with Carl Linnaeus in 1758, and was again advanced by J.D. Smith in 1980. It was proposed in its modern form by Australian neuroscientist Jack Pettigrew in 1986 after he discovered that the connections between the retina and the superior colliculus (a region of the midbrain) in the megabat Pteropus were organized in the same way found in primates, and purportedly different from all other mammals. This was followed up by a longer study published in 1989, in which this was supported by the analysis of many other brain and body characteristics. Pettigrew suggested that flying foxes, colugos, and primates were all descendants of the same group of early arboreal mammals. The megabat flight and the colugo gliding could be both seen as locomotory adaptations to a life high above the ground.

The flying primate hypothesis met resistance from many zoologists. Its biggest challenges were not centered on the argument that megabats and primates are evolutionarily related, which reflects earlier ideas (such as the grouping of primates, tree shrews, colugos, and bats under the same taxonomic group, the Superorder Archonta). Rather, many biologists resisted the implication that megabats and microbats (or echolocating bats) formed distinct branches of mammalian evolution, with flight having evolved twice. This implication was borne out of the fact that microbats do not resemble primates in any of the neural characteristics studied by Pettigrew, instead resembling primitive mammals such as Insectivora in these respects. The advanced brain characters demonstrated in Pteropus could not, therefore, be generalized to imply that all bats are similar to primates.

More recently, the flying primate hypothesis was soundly rejected when scientists compared the DNA of bats to that of primates. These genetic studies support the monophyly of bats.

== Neurological studies ==
Soon after Pettigrew's study, work on another genus of megabat (Rousettus) disputed the existence of an advanced pattern of connections between the retina and the superior colliculus. However, this conclusion was later criticised on methodological grounds. Later studies have sought further evidence of unique characteristics linking the megabat and primate brains. These studies have had limited success in identifying unique links between megabats and present-day primates, instead concluding that the megabat brain has characteristics that may resemble those likely to have existed in primitive primate brains. Nonetheless, modern neuroanatomical studies have repeatedly supported the existence of very significant differences between the brains of megabats and microbats, which is one of the anchors of the "flying primate" hypothesis.

== Biochemical studies ==
The implication that bats are diphyletic has been fiercely disputed by many zoologists, not only based on the unlikelihood that wings would have evolved twice in mammals, but also on biochemical studies of molecular evolution, which indicate that bats are monophyletic. However, other studies have disputed the validity of these conclusions. In particular, Pettigrew argued incorrectly that phylogenies based solely on DNA data can be subject to an artifact named the "base-compositional bias" Further studies did not find base-compositional bias sufficient to discount support for the monophyly of bats.

== See also ==
- Winged monkeys
