= Breeding pair =

Bonded animals which cooperate to produce offspring

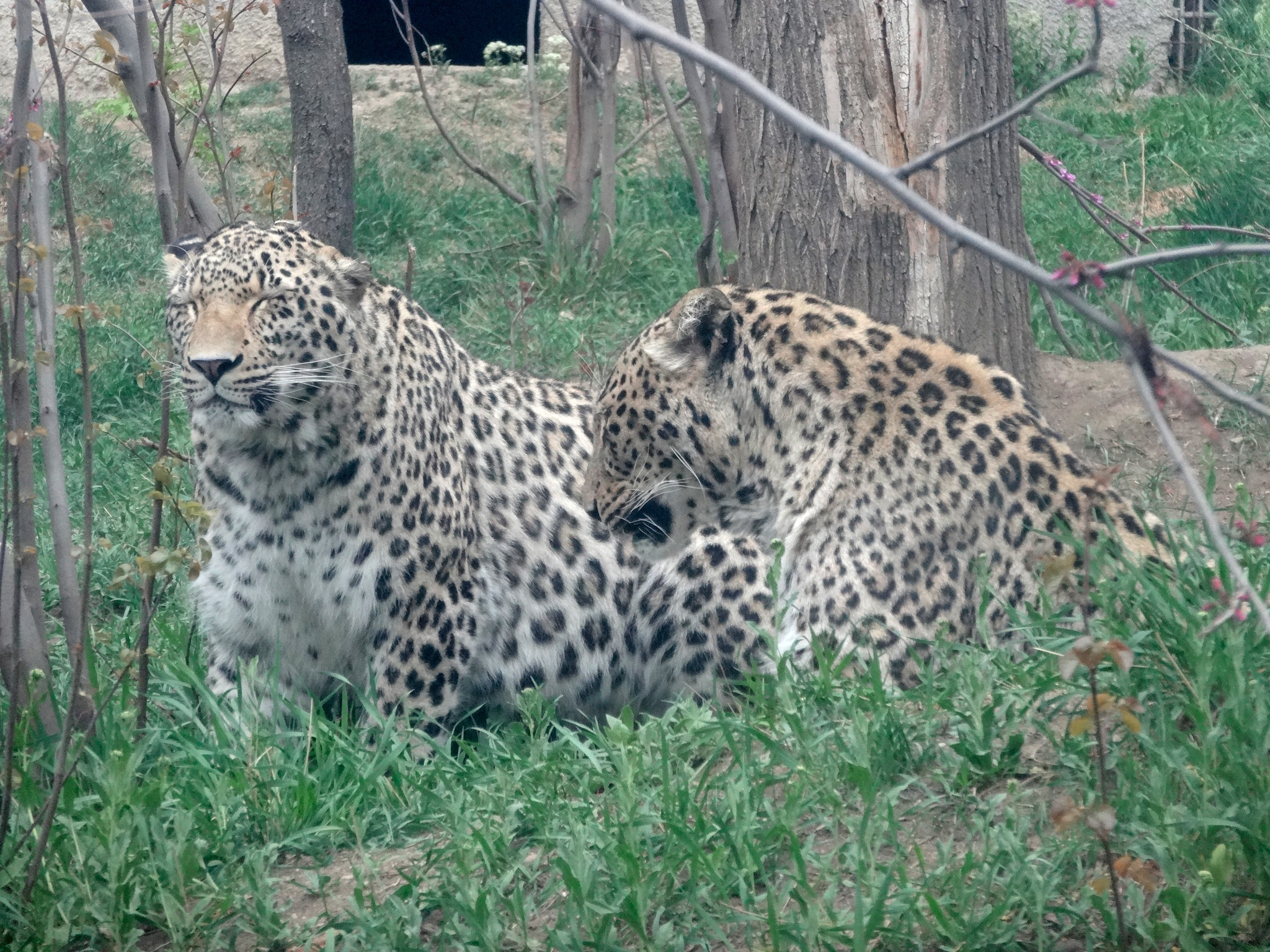
A breeding pair of Persian leopards

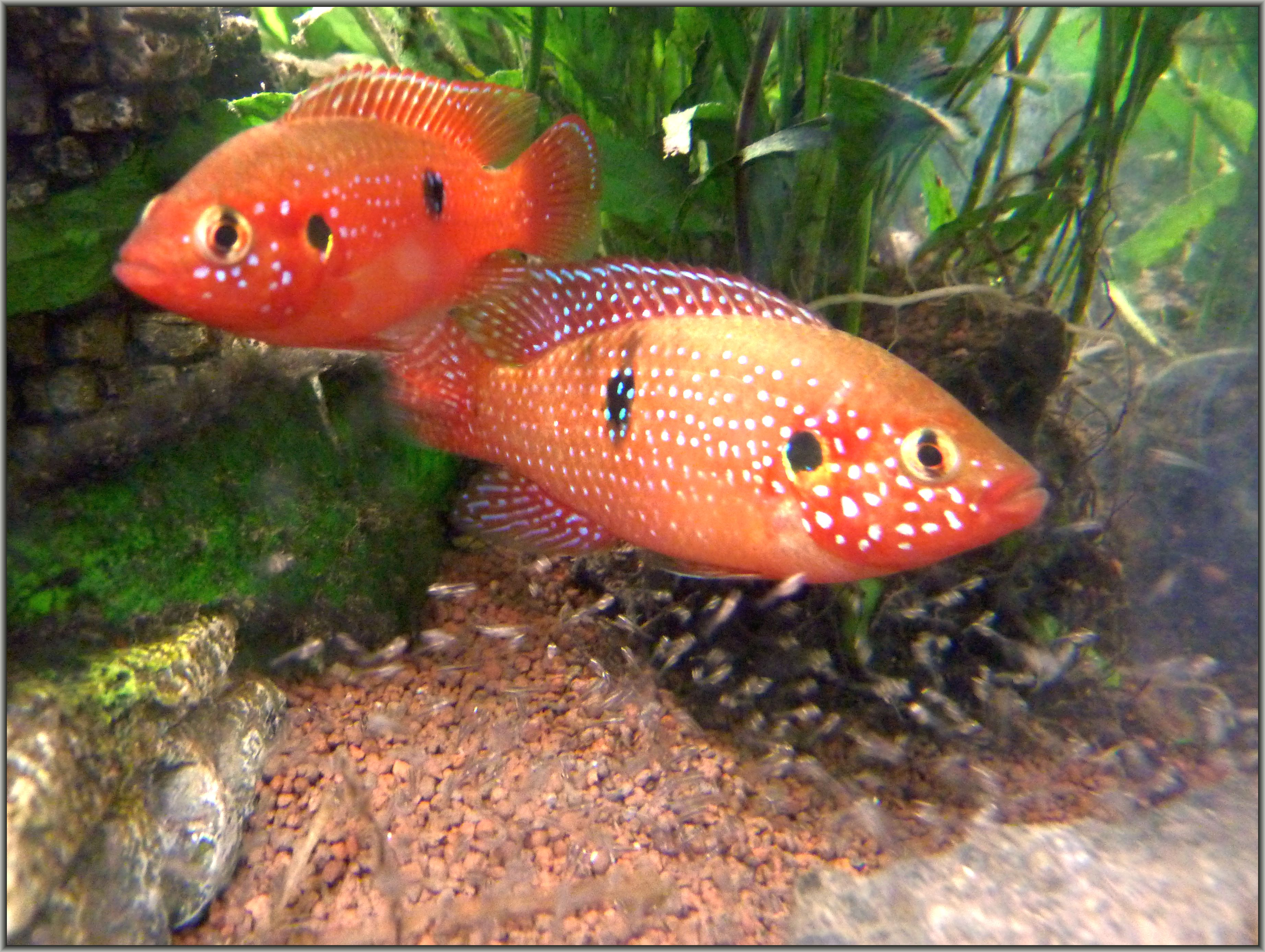
A breeding pair of Jewel cichlids with fry.

Breeding pair is a pair of animals which cooperate over time to produce offspring with some form of a bond between the individuals. For example, many birds mate for a breeding season or sometimes for life. They may share some or all of the tasks involved: for example, a breeding pair of birds may split building a nest, incubating the eggs and feeding and protecting the young. The term is not generally used when a male has a harem of females, such as with mountain gorillas.

True breeding pairs are usually found only in vertebrates, but there are notable exceptions, such as the Lord Howe Island stick insect. True breeding pairs are rare in amphibians or reptiles, although the Australian Shingleback is one exception with long-term pair-bonds. Some fish form short term pairs and the French angelfish is thought to pair-bond over a long term. True breeding pairs are quite common in birds. Breeding pair arrangements are rare in mammals, where the prevailing patterns are either that the male and female only meet for copulation (e.g. brown bear) or that dominant males have a harem of females (e.g. walrus).

== See also ==
- Pair bond
- Monogamous pairing in animals
