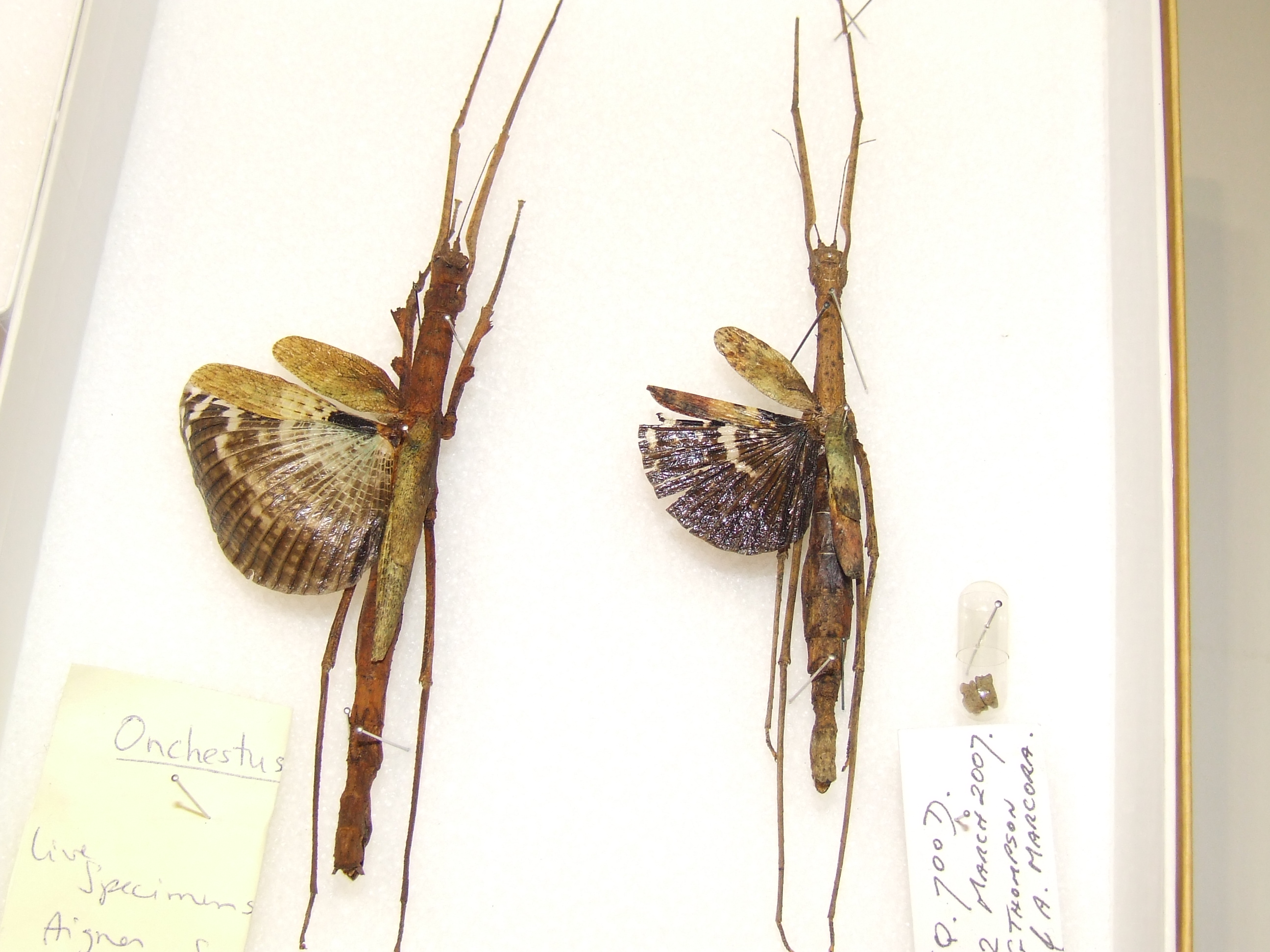
- Onchestus rentzi

Scientific classification
- Kingdom: Animalia
- Phylum: Arthropoda
- Clade: Pancrustacea
- Class: Insecta
- Order: Phasmatodea
- Family: Phasmatidae
- Subfamily: Phasmatinae
- Tribe: Phasmatini
- Genus: Onchestus; Stål, 1877

= Onchestus (phasmid) =

Genus of stick insects

Onchestus is a genus of stick insects in the tribe Phasmatini.

== Genera ==
- Onchestus gorgus (Westwood, 1859)
- Onchestus rentzi Brock & Hasenpusch, 2006
- Onchestus ripperae Brock & Hasenpusch, 2022
