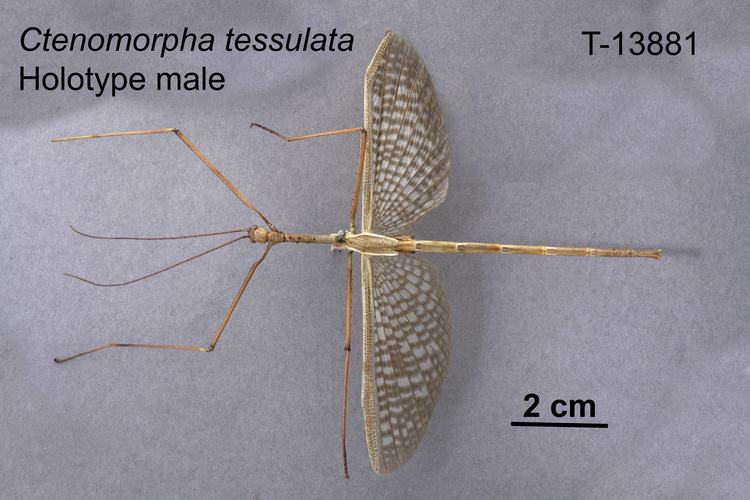
- Anchiale austrotessulata male

Scientific classification
- Kingdom: Animalia
- Phylum: Arthropoda
- Clade: Pancrustacea
- Class: Insecta
- Order: Phasmatodea
- Family: Phasmatidae
- Subfamily: Phasmatinae
- Tribe: Phasmatini
- Genus: Anchiale; Stål, 1875

Synonyms
- Ctenomorphodes Karny, 1923

= Anchiale (phasmid) =

Genus of insects

Anchiale is a genus of stick insects in the family Phasmatidae and tribe Phasmatini. Species have a known distribution from Australasia. The type species, A. maculata, was originally thought to be a Mantis.

== Species ==
Anchiale includes the following species:

1. Anchiale austrotessulata Brock & Hasenpusch, 2007
2. Anchiale briareus (Gray, 1834)
3. Anchiale buruense Hennemann, Conle & Suzuki, 2015
4. Anchiale caesarea (Redtenbacher, 1908)
5. Anchiale confusa Sharp, 1898
6. Anchiale grayi (Montrouzier, 1855)
7. Anchiale insularis Kirby, 1904
8. Anchiale longipennis (Montrouzier, 1855)
9. Anchiale mabiensis Coupland & Emmott, 2026
10. Anchiale maculata (Olivier, 1792) - type species (as Mantis maculata Olivier, AG)
11. Anchiale marmorata (Redtenbacher, 1908)
12. Anchiale modesta Redtenbacher, 1908
13. Anchiale reticulata (Palisot de Beauvois, 1805)
14. Anchiale robusta (Brock & Jones, 2026)
15. Anchiale simplex Redtenbacher, 1908
16. Anchiale spinicollis (Gray, 1833)
17. Anchiale stolli Sharp, 1898
18. Anchiale tessulata (Goeze, 1778)
