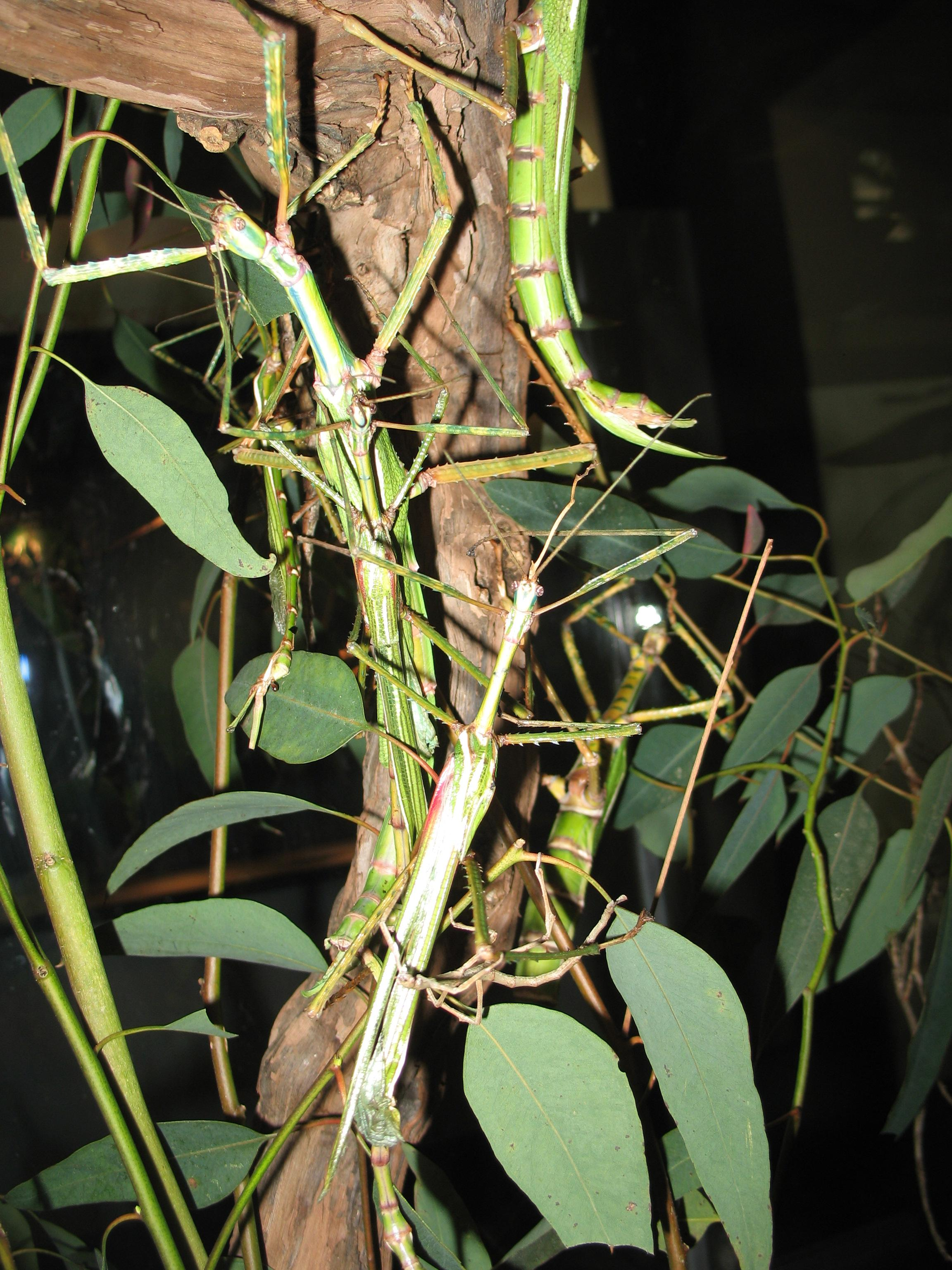
- adults of E. goliath

Scientific classification
- Kingdom: Animalia
- Phylum: Arthropoda
- Class: Insecta
- Order: Phasmatodea
- Family: Phasmatidae
- Subfamily: Phasmatinae
- Tribe: Phasmatini
- Genus: Eurycnema; Audinet-Serville, 1838

Synonyms
- Clemacantha Rainbow, 1897

= Eurycnema =

Genus of insects

Eurycnema is a genus of stick insects in the family Phasmatidae and tribe Phasmatini. Species have a known distribution from Australia, New Guinea, Kei islands, Timor, Wetar & Solor.

== Species ==
Eurycnema includes the following species:

1. Eurycnema goliath (Gray, 1834)
2. Eurycnema nigrospinosa Redtenbacher, 1908
3. Eurycnema osiris (Gray, 1834)
4. Eurycnema versirubra (Audinet-Serville, 1838) - type species (as Cyphocrania versirubra Audinet-Serville, by subsequent designation)
