= Ball's Pyramid =

Island in the Pacific Ocean

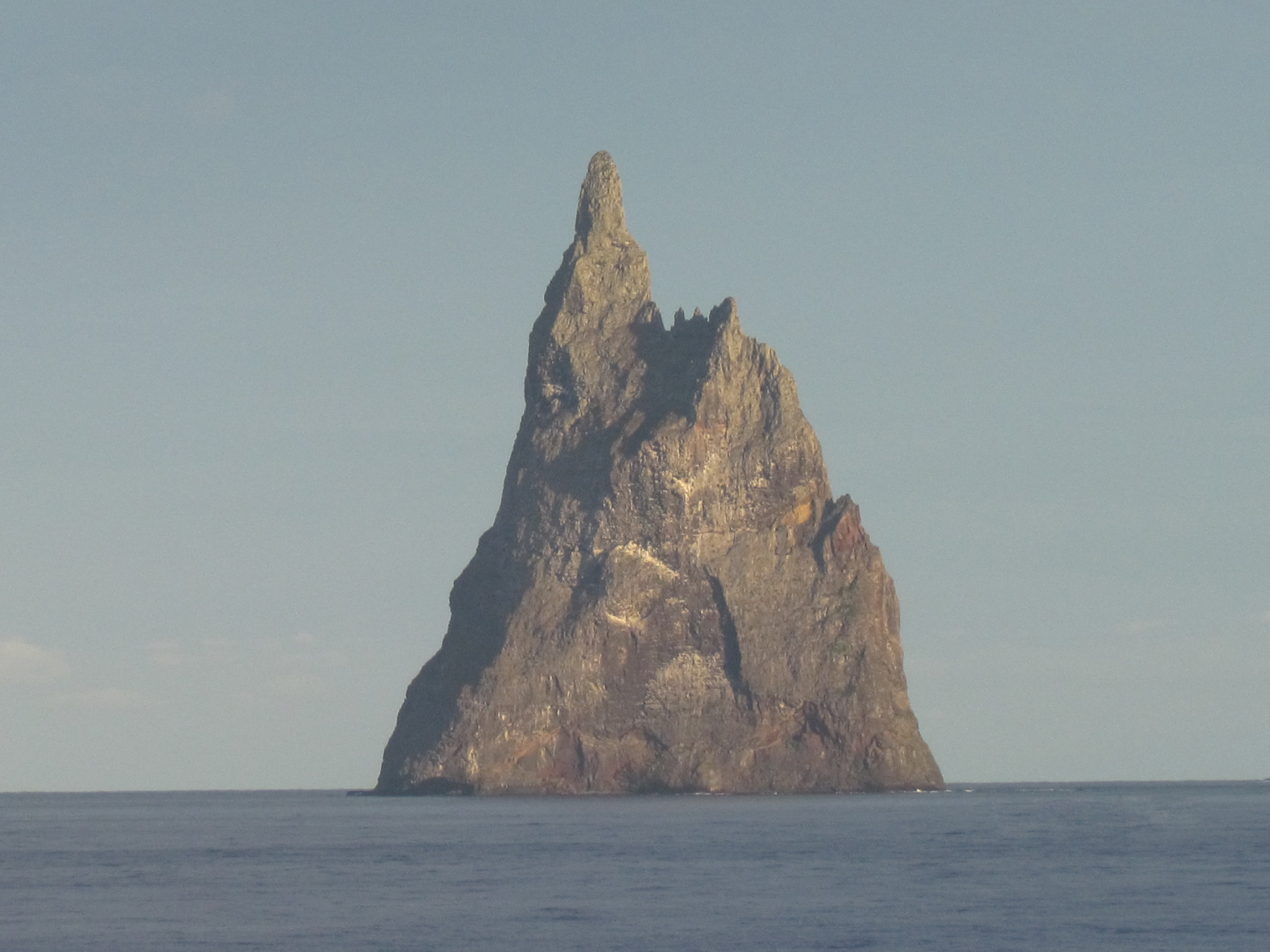
- Ball's Pyramid seen from the surrounding waters

- Ball's Pyramid is to the southeast of Lord Howe Island

- Location within Oceania

Geography
- Location: Pacific Ocean
- Coordinates: 31°45′15″S 159°15′06″E
- Length: 1,100 m (3600 ft)
- Width: 300 m (1000 ft)
- Highest elevation: 572 m (1877 ft)

Administration
- Australia
- State: New South Wales

Ball's Pyramid is an uninhabited islet in the Pacific Ocean located 20 kilometres (12 mi; 11 nmi) southeast of Lord Howe Island, between Australia and New Zealand. The steep rocky basalt outcrop is the eroded plug of a shield volcano and caldera that formed 6.4 million years ago. It is 572 metres (1,877 ft) high, 1,100 metres (3,609 ft) long and only 300 metres (984 ft) across, making it the tallest volcanic stack in the world.

Ball's Pyramid, which is part of Australia's Lord Howe Island Marine Park, is positioned in the centre of a submarine shelf surrounded by rough seas, which makes any approach difficult. The pyramid is home to the only remaining wild population of the giant Lord Howe Island stick insect, thought to be extinct since 1920 until their rediscovery in 2001.

== History ==
=== Discovery ===
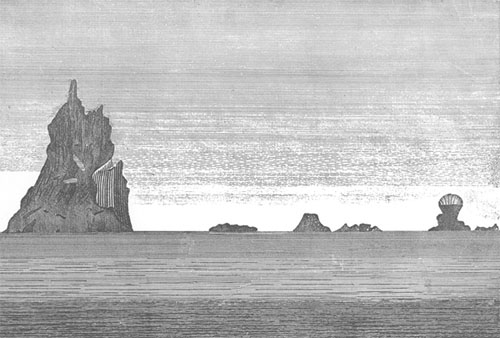
Illustration of Ball's Pyramid (on the farthest left) that accompanied Arthur Phillip's description

The pyramid is named after Royal Navy Lieutenant Henry Lidgbird Ball, who reported finding it in 1788. On the same voyage, Ball also discovered Lord Howe Island, Ball's Pyramid's nearest landmass.

In The Voyage of Governor Phillip to Botany Bay with an Account of the Establishment of the Colonies of Port Jackson and Norfolk Island (1789), Arthur Phillip gives this description of the area around Ball's Pyramid before describing Lord Howe Island:

There lies about four miles from the south-west part of the pyramid, a dangerous rock, which shows itself a little above the surface of the water, and appears not to be larger than a boat. Lieutenant Ball had no opportunity of examining whether there is a safe passage between them or not.

=== Survey and exploration ===
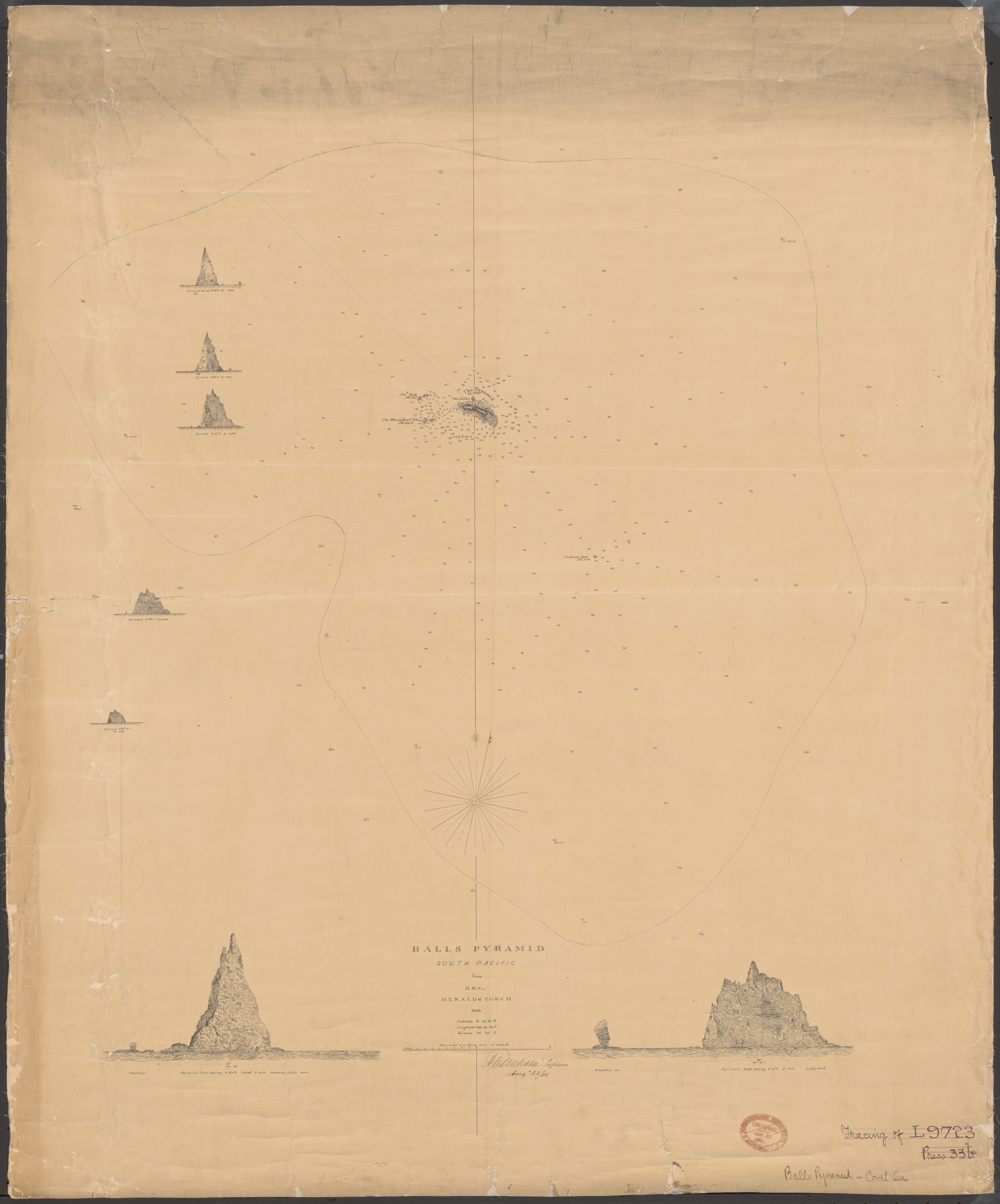
Denham's 1853 chart of Ball's Pyramid

In June 1822 the Russian naval sloop Apollon, under the command of a Lieutenant Krushchev, reconnoitered and recorded the location of Ball's Pyramid.

In May 1853, Henry Mangles Denham with HMS Herald and HMS Torch surveyed the area around Lord Howe Island including Ball's Pyramid, producing the first chart of the pyramid.

The first recorded person to go ashore is believed to have been Henry Wilkinson, a geologist at the New South Wales Department of Mines, in 1882.

In 1964, a team from Sydney attempted to climb to the summit of the pyramid. However, the climbers were forced to turn back on the fifth day as they ran short of food and water. The expedition was the idea of Australian adventurer Dick Smith, who was a member of Rover Scouts at the time. The expedition also involved other members of the Scouting movement and other people. Smith went on the expedition, but did not attempt the climb due to an unexpected medical operation two weeks before the expedition.

Ball's Pyramid was first climbed on 14 February 1965 by Bryden Allen, John Davis, Jack Pettigrew and David Witham of the Sydney Rock Climbing Club. Jack Hill of New Zealand then climbed to the summit with Pettigrew on the following day. Don Willcox and Ben Sandilands were part of the support team.

In 1979, Smith returned to the pyramid, together with climbers John Worrall and Hugh Ward. They successfully reached the summit and unfurled a flag of New South Wales provided to them by Premier Neville Wran.

Climbing was banned in 1982 under amendments to the Lord Howe Island Act, and in 1986, all access to the island was banned by the Lord Howe Island Board. In 1990, the policy was relaxed to allow some climbing under strict conditions, which in recent years has required an application to the relevant state minister.

== Geography ==
Like Lord Howe Island and the Lord Howe Seamount Chain, Ball's Pyramid is based on the Lord Howe Rise, part of the submerged continent of Zealandia. Ball's Pyramid has a few satellite islets. Observatory Rock and Wheatsheaf Islet lie about 800 metres (2,600 ft) west-northwest and west-southwest respectively, of the western extremity of Ball's Pyramid. Southeast Rock is a pinnacle located about 3.5 kilometres (2.2 mi) southeast of Ball's Pyramid.

The shelf is 20 kilometres (12 mi) in length and averages 10 kilometres (6.2 mi) in width and lies under an average depth of 50 metres (160 ft) of water. It is separated by a 500-metre-deep (1,600 ft) submarine canyon from another shelf on which Lord Howe Island is located. The cliffs of the stack continue under the water surface to the level of the shelf.

== Flora and fauna ==
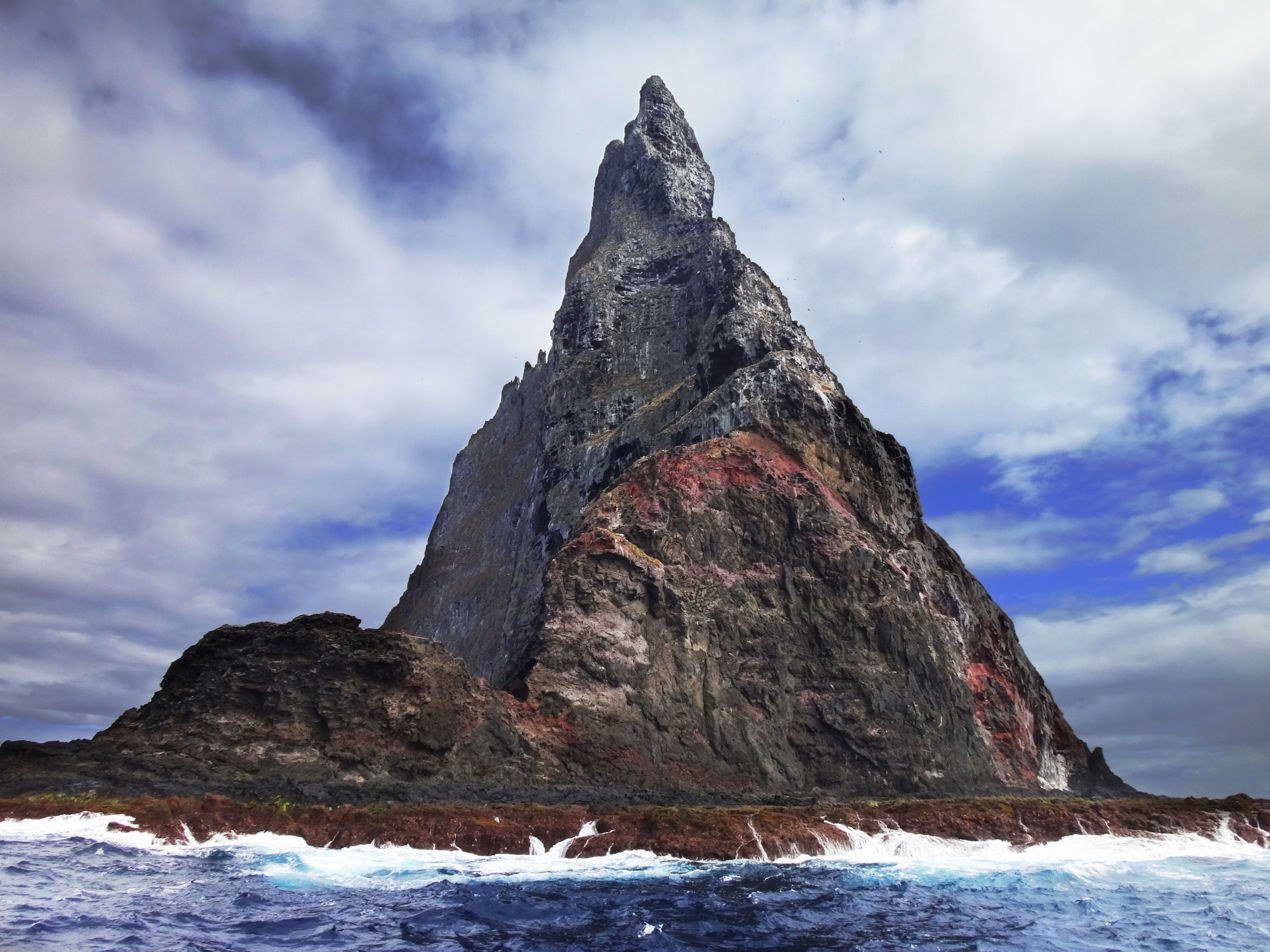
A closer view of the island

=== Lord Howe Island stick insect ===
Ball's Pyramid supports the last known wild population of the Lord Howe Island stick insect (Dryococelus australis).

Following the last sighting of the Lord Howe Island stick insect on Lord Howe Island in 1920, the species was presumed extinct. Evidence of continued survival on Ball's Pyramid was discovered during the 1964 climb when a dead specimen was found and photographed. Throughout the following years, several more dead specimens were discovered, but attempts to find live specimens were unsuccessful.

In 2001, a team of entomologists and conservationists landed on Ball's Pyramid to chart its flora and fauna. As they had hoped, they discovered a population of the Lord Howe Island stick insect living in an area of 6 by 30 metres (20 by 100 ft), at a height of 100 metres (330 ft) above the shoreline, under a single Melaleuca howeana shrub. The population was extremely small, with only 24 individuals. Two pairs were brought to mainland Australia, and new populations have been successfully bred with the ultimate goal of reintroduction to Lord Howe Island.

In 2014, an unauthorised climbing team sighted live stick insects in an exposed position 65 metres (213 ft) below the summit of Ball's Pyramid in a thicket of sedge plants, suggesting that the insect's range on Ball's Pyramid is more widespread than previously held, and that its food preferences are not limited to Melaleuca howeana.

=== Melaleuca howeana ===
A Melaleuca howeana shrub was found growing on Ball's Pyramid. The bush was growing in a small crevice where water was seeping through cracks in the underlying rocks. This moisture supported relatively lush plant growth which had, over time, resulted in a buildup of plant debris several metres deep.

=== Ballina angelfish ===
Chaetodontoplus ballinae, the Ballina angelfish, is a species of marine ray-finned fish, a marine angelfish, belonging to the family Pomacanthidae. It is endemic to eastern Australia. It inhabits subtropical waters at depths ranging from 15 to 120 metres (49 to 394 feet). It is typically found on deep offshore coastal reefs and around seamounts. The species is relatively common near Ball’s Pyramid, off Lord Howe Island, where it can be observed in deep habitats featuring large boulders, rock piles, peaks, caves, and crevices. Ball’s Pyramid is one of the few locations where the Ballina angelfish has ever been photographed. Despite these sightings, little is known about its biology; individuals are usually seen alone or in pairs.

== See also ==
- List of volcanoes in Australia
- Lot's Wife (crag)
- Rockall
- Stac Lee
- Stac an Armin
- Twelve Apostles Marine National Park
