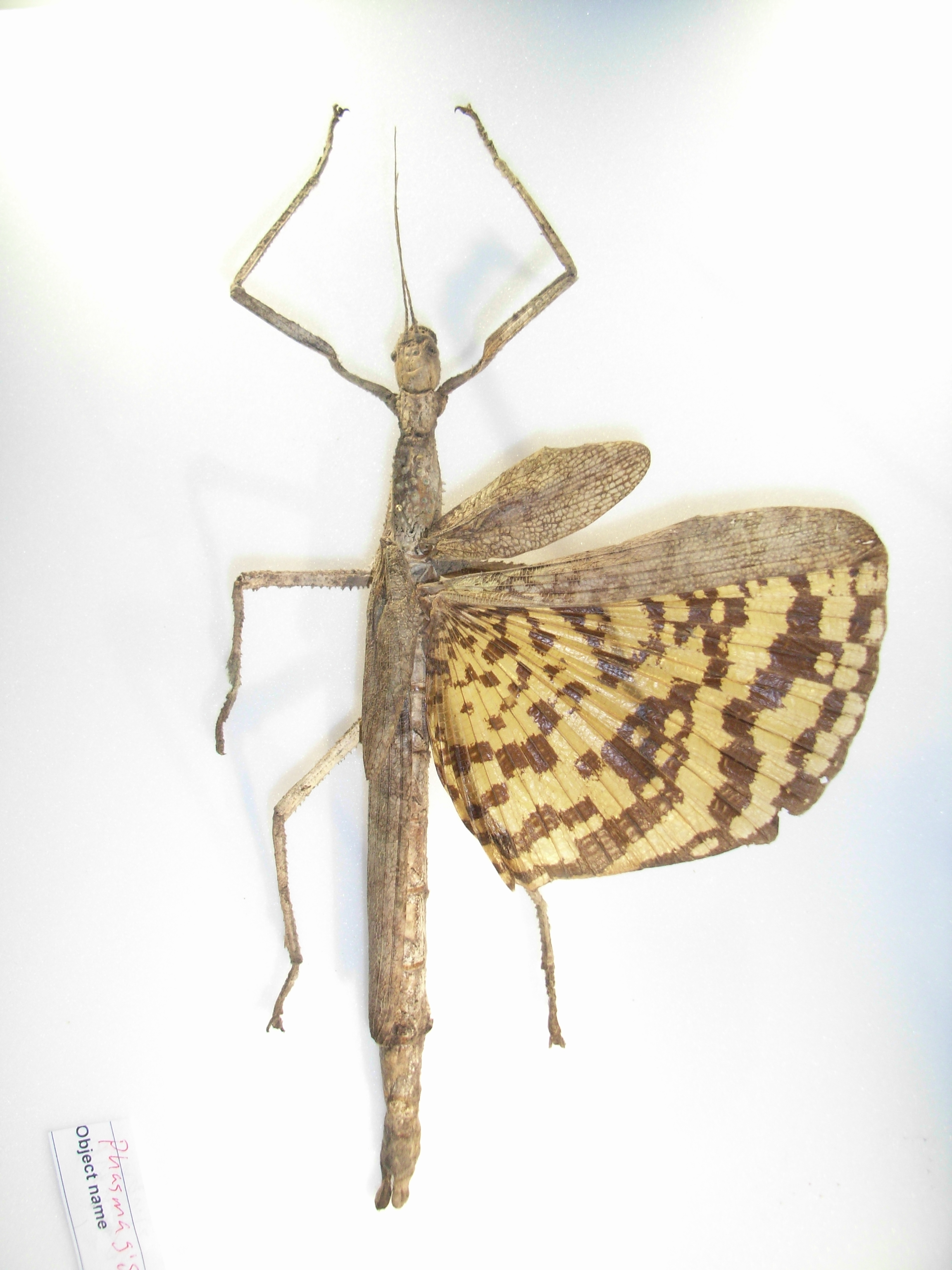
- Phasma gigas

Scientific classification
- Kingdom: Animalia
- Phylum: Arthropoda
- Class: Insecta
- Order: Phasmatodea
- Family: Phasmatidae
- Tribe: Phasmatini
- Genus: Phasma; Lichtenstein, 1796

Synonyms
- Cyphocrana Peletier de Saint Fargeau & Audinet-Serville, 1828; Cyphocrania Burmeister, 1838

= Phasma =

Genus of stick insects

Phasma is a genus of stick insects in the family Phasmatidae, subfamily Phasmatinae and tribe Phasmatini. It is found in Wallacea & New Guinea.

== Species ==
The Catalogue of Life lists:

- Phasma gigas (Linnaeus, 1758) – type species (as Phasma empusa Lichtenstein)
- Phasma marosense Hennemann, 1998
- Phasma reinwardtii Haan, 1842

== Additional images ==
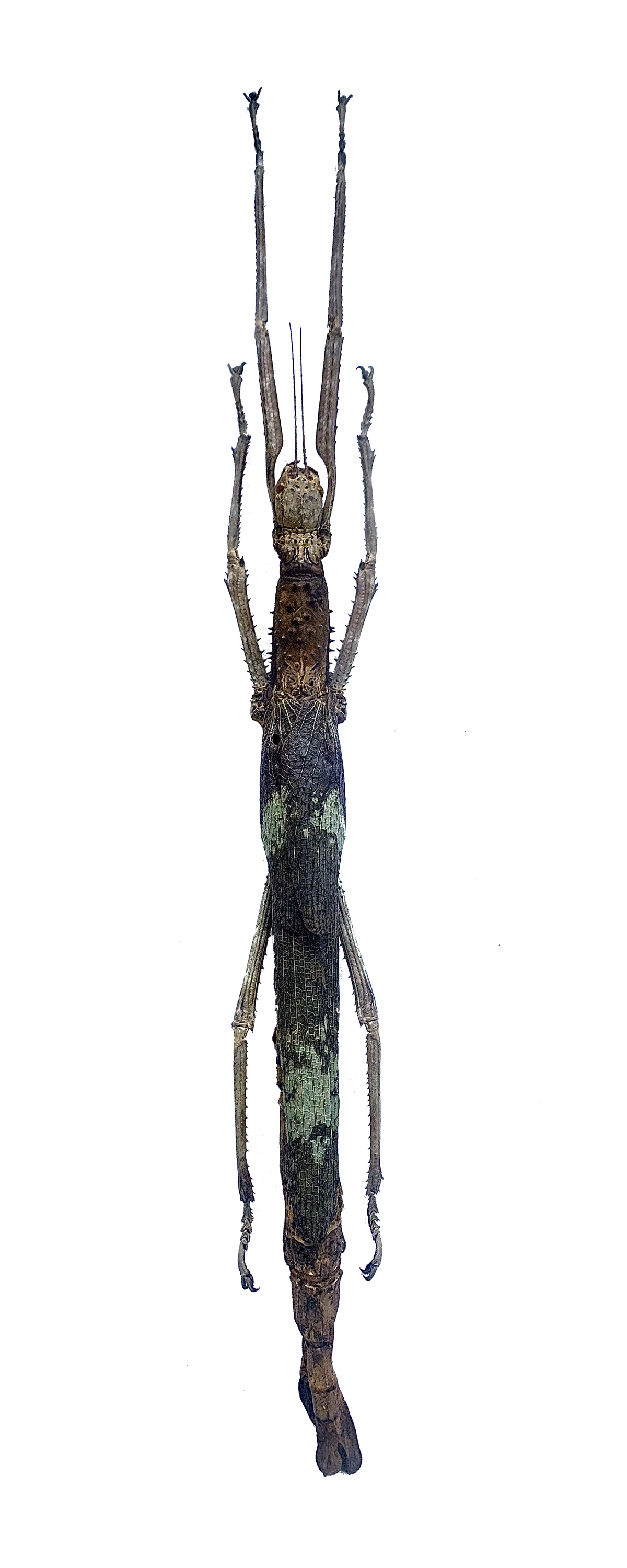
Adult female Phasma reinwardtii specimen
