= Stack (geology) =

Geological landform consisting of a steep and often vertical column or columns of rock

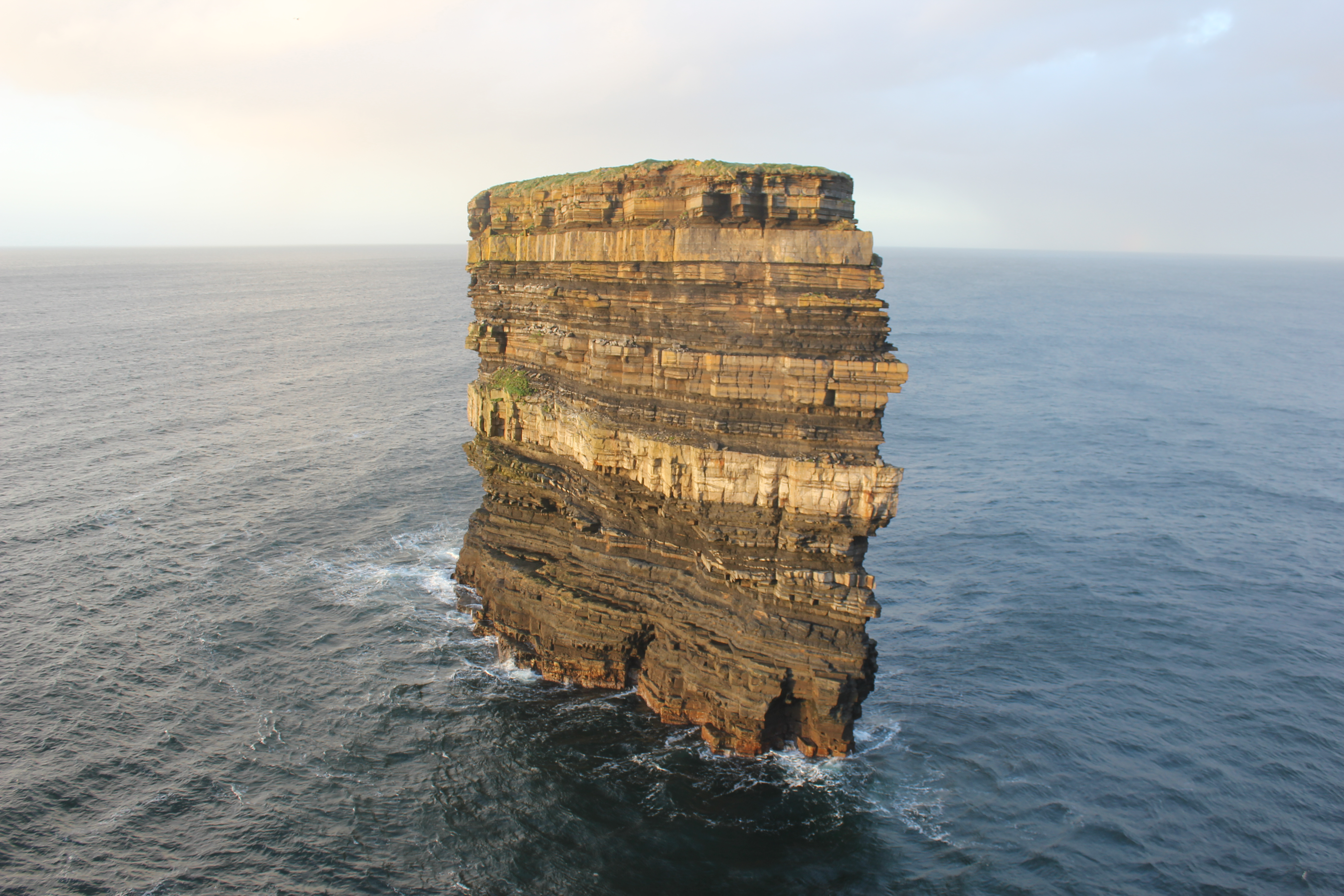
Downpatrick Head Dún Briste, County Mayo, Ireland. Clear horizontal bedding is visible, exposing 350 million years of geological history.

A stack or sea stack is a coastal geological landform consisting of a steep and often vertical column or columns of rock in the sea near a coast, formed by wave erosion. Stacks are formed over time by wind and water, processes of coastal geomorphology.

Stacks form when a headland is progressively eroded by hydraulic action and abrasion. The force of the sea exploits structural weaknesses in the rock, such as joints, bedding planes, and faults, causing cracks to expand into caves and eventually collapse into free-standing pillars. Coastal stacks provide critical predator-free nesting sites for seabirds, and many are prominent destinations for rock climbing.

Isolated, steep-sided oceanic islets typically of volcanic origin are also loosely referred to as "stacks" or "volcanic stacks".

== Formation ==
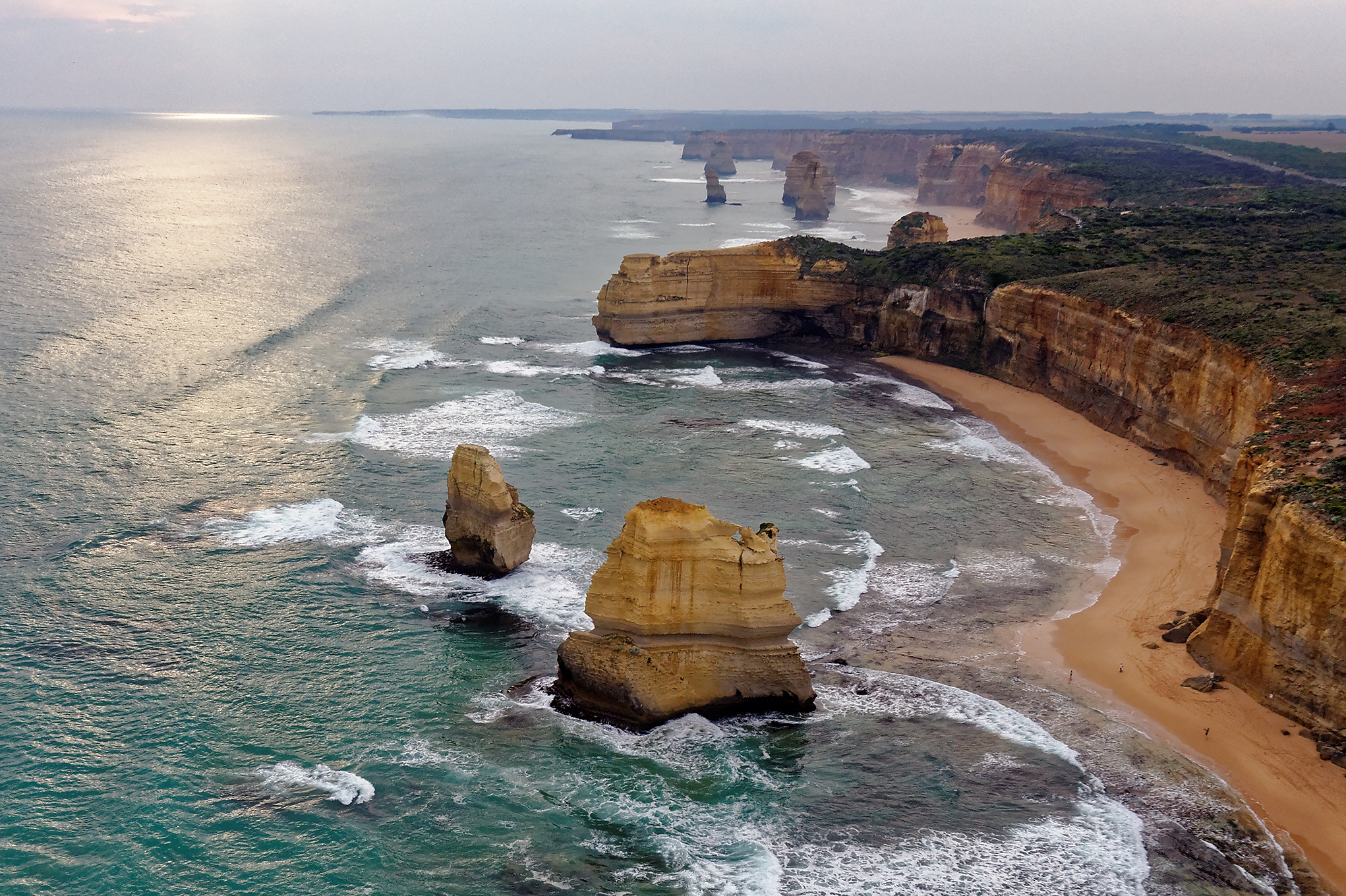
The Twelve Apostles stacks in Victoria, Australia

Stacks typically form in horizontally bedded sedimentary or volcanic rocks, particularly on limestone and chalk cliffs. The medium hardness and compressive strength of these rocks provide moderate resistance to marine erosion, while a harder overlying layer may act as a protective capstone. Cliffs made of weaker materials, such as claystone or heavily fractured rock, tend to slump and erode too rapidly to maintain vertical pillars, whereas harder rocks such as granite erode through different structural mechanisms.

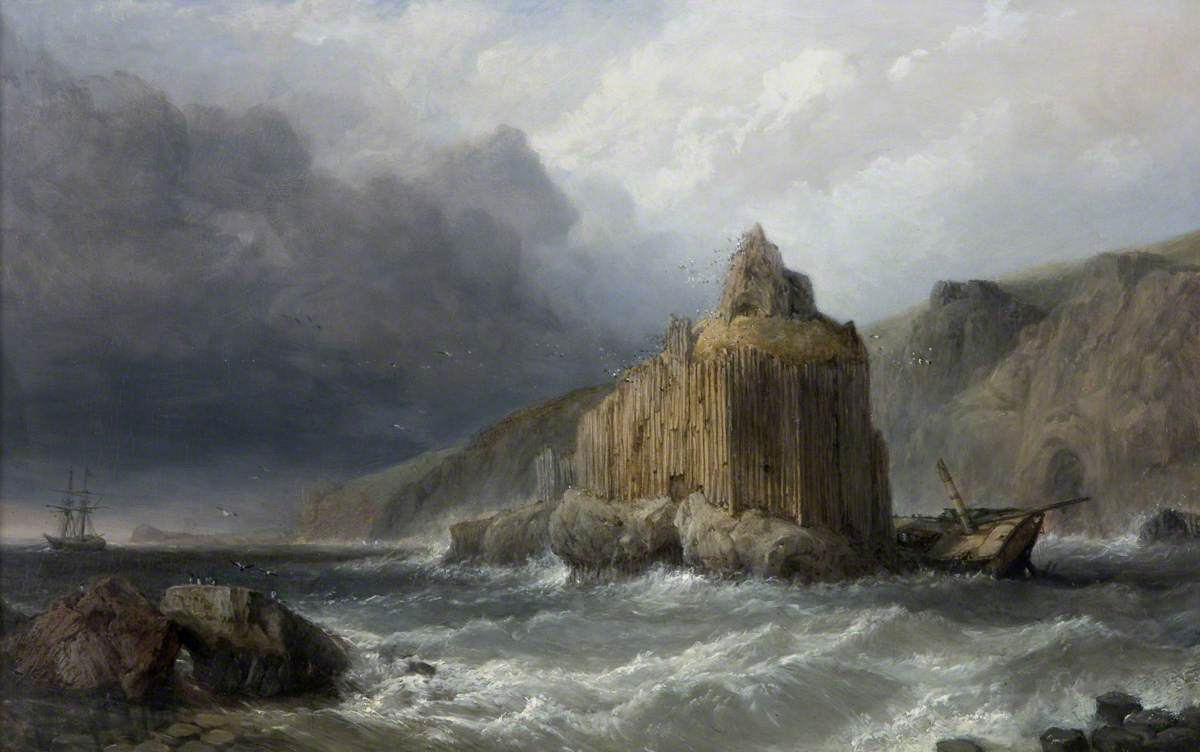
Stack Rock, County Antrim by Clarkson Stanfield, 1861

The formation process follows a sequence of coastal landform progression:

1. Fissure exploitation: The formation process usually begins when the sea attacks structural weaknesses, such as steep joints or small fault zones in a cliff face.
2. Cave and arch creation: Cracks gradually expand into sea caves. If a cave erodes completely through a headland, a natural arch is formed.
3. Arch collapse: Further erosion (through freeze-thaw action, biological weathering) weakens the roof of the arch while wave action undercuts its legs. Gravity eventually causes the arch roof to collapse, isolating a vertical pillar of rock and forming a stack.
4. Stump degradation: Continuous wave attack at sea level undercuts the stack until it collapses, leaving behind a low-lying stump. This then usually forms a small rock island, low enough for a high tide to submerge.

On geological timescales, sea stacks are temporary landforms; continued marine erosion causes them to degrade, providing a visual record of headland retreat.

== Regional terminology ==
In different geographical regions, stacks are known by local names:

- Rauk – Used in Sweden, particularly around the island of Gotland, referring to limestone stacks formed during the post-glacial uplift.
- Faraglioni – Italian terminology applied to stacks found along the Mediterranean coastlines, such as those off Capri.
- Needles or Pinnacles – Common descriptive terms throughout the British Isles and Pacific Northwest of North America.

== Notable examples ==
- Ball's Pyramid (Australia) – The tallest sea stack in the world at 562 metres, formed from a remnant volcanic neck.
- Rock of Raouché (Lebanon) – Two limestone formations, the larger containing a natural arch, long serving as an offshore Beirut landmark.
- Old Man of Hoy (Scotland) – 137-metre Old Red Sandstone stack in Orkney, famous in the history of sea-stack climbing.
- The Twelve Apostles (Australia) – Renowned group of limestone stacks along the Great Ocean Road.
- Dún Briste (Ireland) – Prominent 50-metre vertical sea stack said to have severed from Downpatrick Head in 1393.
- Kicker Rock (Ecuador) – 148-metre volcanic cone remnant in the Galápagos Islands.
- St Michael's Arch (Australia) – Landmark stack formed by a collapsed natural arch in 1867, prior to its own collapse in 1959.

== See also ==
- List of sea stacks
- Coastal erosion
- Wave-cut platform
