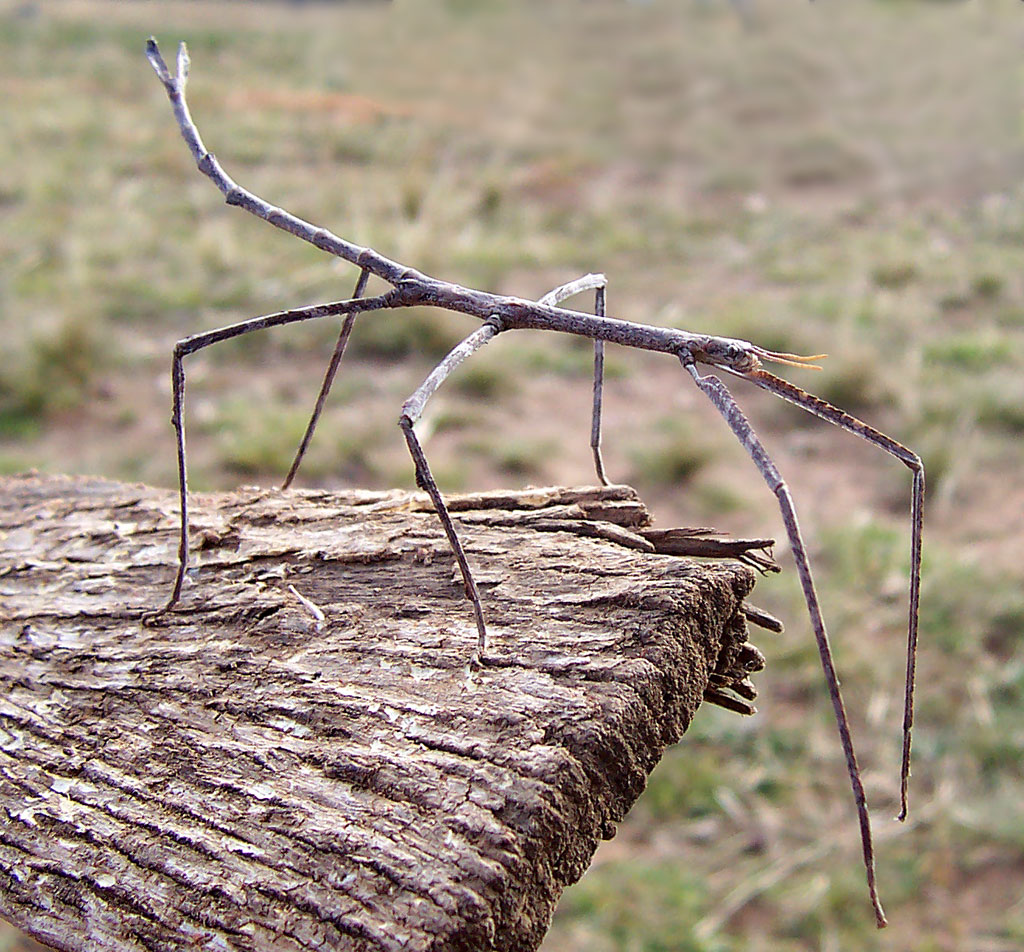
- Ctenomorpha marginipennis

Scientific classification
- Kingdom: Animalia
- Phylum: Arthropoda
- Clade: Pancrustacea
- Class: Insecta
- Order: Phasmatodea
- Family: Phasmatidae
- Subfamily: Phasmatinae
- Tribe: Phasmatini; Leach, 1815

= Phasmatini =

Tribe of stick insects

Phasmatini is a tribe of stick insects in the family Phasmatidae. There are more than 40 described species, found in Australasia, and Asia.

== Genera ==
The Phasmida species file includes:

1. Acrophylla Gray, 1835
2. Anchiale Stål, 1875
3. Cigarrophasma Brock & Hasenpusch, 2001 (monotypic Cigarrophasma tessellatum)
4. Clemacantha Rainbow, 1897
5. Ctenomorpha Gray, 1833
6. Dryococelus Gurney, 1947 (monotypic)
7. Eurycnema Serville, 1838
8. Onchestus Stål, 1877
9. Paractenomorpha Hennemann & Conle, 2004 (monotypic Paractenomorpha baehri)
10. Paracyphocrania Redtenbacher, 1908
11. Paronchestus Redtenbacher, 1908
12. Peloriana Uvarov, 1940 (monotypic Peloriana lobiceps)
13. Phasma Lichtenstein, 1796
