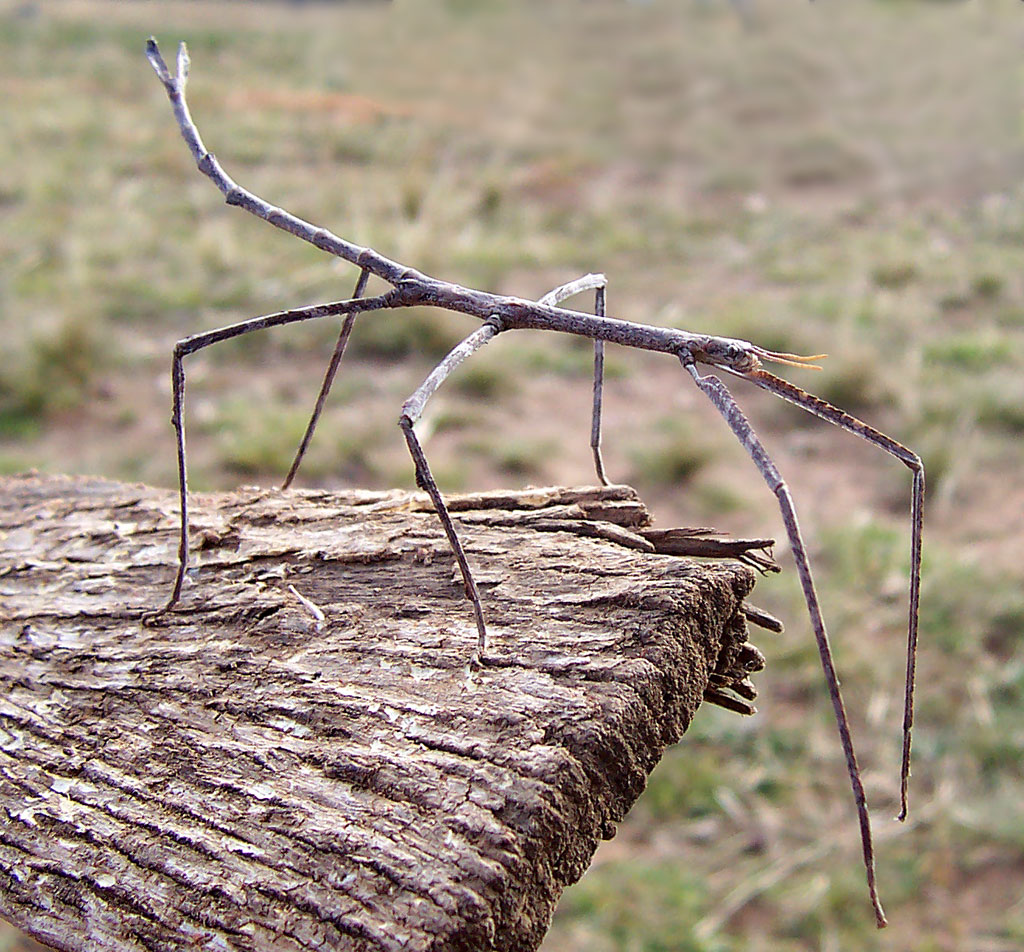
- Ctenomorpha chronus (Phasmatini)

Scientific classification
- Kingdom: Animalia
- Phylum: Arthropoda
- Clade: Pancrustacea
- Class: Insecta
- Order: Phasmatodea
- Suborder: Euphasmatodea
- Infraorder: Anareolatae
- Family: Phasmatidae
- Subfamily: Phasmatinae; Leach, 1815

Tribes
- See text

Synonyms
- Acrophyllini Redtenbacher, 1908; Phasminae Leach, 1815; Phasminae Karny, 1923

= Phasmatinae =

Subfamily of stick insects

The Phasmatinae are a subfamily of stick insects in the family Phasmatidae. They contain at least three tribes; Bradley and Galil corrected the spelling to "Phasmatinae" and provides a key to tribes.

== Tribes and genera ==
The Phasmida Species File lists three tribes:

=== Acanthomimini ===
Authority: Günther, 1953; distribution Australasia

- Acanthomima Kirby, 1904
- Anophelepis Westwood, 1859
- Arphax Stål, 1875
- Echetlus (phasmid) Stål, 1875
- Mauritiophasma Cliquennois & Brock, 2004
- Vasilissa Kirby, 1896

=== Acanthoxylini ===
Authority: Bradley & Galil, 1977

- Acanthoxyla Uvarov, 1944
- Argosarchus Hutton, 1898
- Clitarchus Stål, 1875
- Pseudoclitarchus Salmon, 1991
- Tepakiphasma Buckley & Bradler, 2010

=== Phasmatini ===
Selected genera (mostly from Australasia and SE Asia):

- Acrophylla Gray, 1835
- Anchiale Stål, 1875
- Eurycnema Audinet-Serville, 1838
- Onchestus Stål, 1877
- Phasma Lichtenstein, 1796

=== Inclusion of Other Tribes ===
Some treatments include up to seven tribes in this subfamily. The Clitumnini and Pharnaciini are here separated in a distinct subfamily Clitumninae, and while the Achriopterini and Stephanacridini have also been placed in the Phasmatinae, other authors treat them as tribes incertae sedis among the Phasmatidae as is done here.
