= Women's Museum of California =

Nonprofit museum in San Diego, California

Coordinates: 32.739°N 117.214°W

- Abbreviation: WMC
- Formation: 1983
- Founder: Mary Maschal
- Founded at: Golden Hill, San Diego
- Type: Non governmental organization
- Location: Balboa Park, San Diego
- Website: https://sandiegohistory.org/womens-history/
- Formerly called: Women's History Reclamation Project, Women's History Museum & Educational Center

The Women's Museum of California (WMC) was a nonprofit museum in Balboa Park in San Diego, California, dedicated to women's history. It was founded in 1983. It was first organized under the names the Women's History Reclamation Project and then the Women's History Museum and Educational Center.

In addition to exhibits and programs offered, the WMC also co-founded and hosts the San Diego County Women's Hall of Fame; it was located at Liberty Station and had exhibit space, archives, a library, and a store that features items made exclusively by women. Other museum offerings included speakers and monthly lecture series.

== History ==
The museum had its roots with the women's rights activist, Mary B. Maschal who collected items from women's history in her home. The home had formally belonged to a suffragist, Veronica Burke. Maschal had been collecting artifacts relating to women's history since the 1970s. She finally opened her collection to the public in 1983, naming it the Women's History Reclamation Project (WHRP). Maschal felt a passion for collecting artifacts because of her "own disappointment over the lack of knowledge about women's history among the younger generation." Maschal also received a grant in 1984 in order to conduct and collect oral history interviews.

The initial success of Mary Maschal was sparked by the Women's History Reclamation Project. In addition to taking part in UN conferences, Maschal joined the National Organization for Women as a public member while also honing the skills necessary to work well with others in business. To preserve the legacy of past-generational leaders, she started a museum educating others on second-wave feminism. The Women's Museum of California continues to preserve her legacy towards the newer generation.

Maschal moved her collection to the Art Union Building in Golden Hill in 1997. Maschal died in 1998, and Cindy Stankowski and Sue Gonda took over leadership of the museum. In 2000, the museum sponsored a Women's History Poetry contest, which was held at the same time as an exhibit titled In Our Own Voice: women's History through Women's Poetry. The museum co-created the San Diego County Women's Hall of Fame in 2001. In 2003, the Project changed its name to the Women's History Museum and Educational Center (WHMEC).

The Women's History Museum and Educational Center changed its name again in 2011, this time to the Women's Museum of California (WMofC). They concurrently updated the museum logo. WMC also moved to the Liberty Station Promenade in Point Loma in 2012. The new location was three times larger than their former location at Golden Hill.

In 2025 The Women's Museum of California announced that it merged with the San Diego History Center and it is now called the Center for Women's History, a program of the San Diego History Center. As the Center for Women's History it continues the research, exhibits, and programs of the Women's Museum of California.

== Helen Hawkins Memorial Library and Research Archive ==
Part of the museum is a library and archive. The Helen Hawkins Memorial Library and Research Archive includes books and several special collections. Part of the special collections is the Alice Park Archive which collects artifacts from the women's suffrage movement from the late 19th century and early 20th century. The special collections also include papers documenting the career of Lucy Killea, a collection of materials relating to the UN Conference on the Status of Women and the Neff-LeClair Collection of period women's clothing dating from the 18th century on.

The Women's Museum of California collections and archives is now part of the San Diego History Center.

== Film Festival ==
The Women's Museum of California offers a Film Festival that showcases women who have worked in the film industry to show their film creations and share their experiences with others. The film festival includes a panel that consists of activists and filmmakers that discuss the representation and roles of women in the film industry environment.

After eight years, the Women's Film Festival ended in 2021 due to the impact of the COVID-19 pandemic. The following year, the Women's Museum began sponsoring a "Women's Series" under the umbrella of the San Diego International Film Festival.

== San Diego County Women's Hall of Fame ==
The Hall of Fame was created in 2001, partly through the WMofC and other organizations. Some organizations that have partnered with WMofC for the hall of fame include the Girl Scouts, MANA, A National Latina Organization and Executive Women International. Co-Hosts of the HOF include the Museum, the San Diego County Commission on the Status of Women, San Diego State University's Women's Studies Department, and the Women's Center of the University of California, San Diego. Inductions into the hall of fame take place in March during Women's History Month. Each year about five women are inducted.

The San Diego County Women's Hall of Fame mission is "to acknowledge and honor women who have significantly contributed to the quality of life and who have made outstanding volunteer contributions in San Diego County."

=== List of inductees ===
San Diego County Women's Hall of Fame Inductees
Name	Image	Birth–Death	Year	Area of achievement	Ref(s)
Anne S. Bautista			2024	Activist	
Raye Clendening			2024	Empowerer	
Olga Diaz			2024	Trailblazer	
Anne L. Evans		(1932–)	2024	Empowerer	
DJ Kuttin Kandi			2024	Spirit of the Hall of Fame	
Yolanda López		(1942–2021)	2024	Cultural Bridge Builder	
Andrea Naversen			2024	Historian	
Huma Ahmed-Ghosh		(1956–)	2023	Anthropologist	
Norma Chávez-Peterson		(1974–)	2023	Executive director of the ACLU of San Diego and Imperial counties,	
Amy Forsythe			2023	U.S. Navy Reserves as a public affairs officer; Military journalism, U.S. Marine in Iraq and Afghanistan	
Juana Machado		(1814–1901)	2023	Cultural bridge builder	
Patricia A. McQuater		(1951–)	2023	Trailblazer, community service	
Planned Parenthood			2023	Planned Parenthood of the Pacific Southwest	
Mary Salas	Mary Salas at Clinton Rally	(1948–)	2023	Political office holder	
Holly Smithson		(1970–)	2023	Chief executive officer of Athena advocacy group for women	
Marie M. Herney		(1908–1984)	2022	First San Diego woman to practice in Federal Court, and the first local woman to practice in the Supreme Court	
Tamila Ipema		(1956–)	2022	Judge of the California Superior Court in San Diego	
Rosalia Salinas		(1944–)	2022	Advocate for bilingual education	
Josephine Talamantez		(1951–)	2022	Co-founderd Chicano Park in 1970, helped develop it into a cultural National Historic Landmark	
Francine Foster Williams		(1950–2021)	2022	Administrator for the San Diego Unified School District	
Susan Jester		(1943–)	2021	Empowerer	
Margaret Iwanaga Penrose		(1944–)	2021	Cultural Bridge Builder	
Niki de Saint Phalle	Niki de Saint Phalle 1984, by Erling Mandelmann	(1930– 2002)	2021	Sculptor	
Rosalie Schwartz		(1936–2023)	2021	Historian	
Randa Trapp		(1954–)	2021	Court Judge	
Geneviéve Jones-Wright	Geneviéve Jones-Wright, American lawyer from California		2021	San Diego County as a public defender	
Kathi Anderson			2020	Co-founder of Survivors of Torture, International (SURVIVORS)	
Lupe Buell			2020	Bridging the gap between Spanish speaking individuals and the English language	
Nola Butler Byrd		(1956–)	2020	Activist - SDSU's School of Education	
Susan Davis	Representative Susan Davis Official Portrait	(1944–)	2020	U.S. Representative for California's 53rd congressional district	
Iris Engstrand	FFaculty photo of Iris H. Wilson (Iris Higbie Wilson Engstrand) from the 1963 Long Beach City College Yearbook	(1935–)	2020	Historian	
Sue Gonda			2020	Historian and founder of San Diego County Women's Hall of Fame	
Olivia Puentes Reynolds		(1949–)	2020	Civic leader and founder of San Diego County Women's Hall of Fame	
Lilia Garcia			2019	San Diego County Deputy District Attorney and co-founder of the group "Latinas in the Law."	
Colleen O'Harra			2019	Founding Executive Director of the Oceanside Women's Resource Center	
Ruth Goldschmiedova Sax		(1928–2018)	2019	Survivor of three Nazi concentration camps	
Dorothy Smith		(1939–2022)	2019	First African American woman elected to public office in San Diego County	
Bridget Wilson			2019	LGBT military veteran worked within the Obama administration	
Dede Alpert		(1945–)	2018	Served in both houses of the California legislature	
Nellie Andrade		(1942–)	2018	Community activist in the Latino community	
Fahari Jeffers		(1954–2019)	2018	Labor leader, United Domestic Workers of America	
Carol Jahnkow		(1948–)	2018	Bridge Builder	
Jerrilyn Malana		(1963–)	2018	Past president of the San Diego County bar association and Pan Asian Lawyers of San Diego	
Janice Martinelli		(1952–)	2018	Historic preservationist	
Dilkhwaz Ahmed			2017	Bridge Builder	
Carol Rowell Council		(1948–)	2017	Empowerer	
Darlene Davies		(1939–2022)	2017	Historian	
Irma Gonzalez	Judge Irma Gonzalez	(1948–)	2017	Trailblazer	
Joyce Nower		(1932–2010)	2017	Empowerer	
Lilia Velasquez		(1953–)	2017	Activist	
Sally Wong Avery		(1952–)	2016	Cultural Competent Bridge Builder	
Maria Garcia			2016	Historian	
Christine Kehoe	Christine T. Kehoe	(1950–)	2016	Trailblazer	
Elizabeth Lou			2016	Empowerer	
Evonne Seron Schulze		(1934–)	2016	Activist	
Viviana Enrique Acosta			2015	Historian	
Anita Figueredo		(1916–2010)	2015	Trailblazer	
Natasha Josefowitz		(1926–2023)	2015	Empowerment	
Lee Ann Kim	Lee Ann Kim at White Sands, New Mexico	(1970–)	2015	Spirit Of The Women's Hall Of Fame	
Starla Lewis			2015	Cultural Competent Bridge Builder	
Sarah Moser			2015	Activist	
Dianne (Dee) Aker			2014	Trailblazer	
Lorraine Boyce		(1927–)	2014	Empowerer	
Sonia Lopez			2014	Cultural guardian	
Rachael Ortiz			2014	Activist	
Deborah Szekely	Deborah Szekely	(1922–)	2014	Cultural Competent Bridge Builder	
Bree Walker		(1953–)	2014	Spirit Of The Women's Hall Of Fame	
Betty Evans Boone		(1928–2023)	2013	Empowerer	
Constance Carroll		(1945–)	2013	Trailblazer	
Irma Castro			2013	Activist	
Aurora Soriano Cudal			2013	Cultural Competent Bridge Builder	
Dorothy Hom		(1932–1999)	2013	Cultural guardian	
Jane Booth		(1912–2008)	2012	Historian	
Barbara Bry	San Diego City Councilmember Barbara Bry	(1949–)	2012	Empowerer	
Makeda Dread Cheatom		(1942–)	2012	Cultural Competent Bridge Builder.	
Ingrid Croce		(1947–)	2012	Spirit Of The Women's Hall Of Fame	
Anne Hoiberg		(1937–)	2012	Activist	
Lynn Schenk	Lynn Schenk, former Congresswoman from California	(1945–)	2012	Trailblazer	
Margaret Costanza		(1932–2010)	2011	Trailblazer	
Judy Forman			2011	Empowerer	
Donna Frye		(1952–)	2011	Spirit Of The Women's Hall Of Fame	
Clara M. Harris		(1931–)	2011	Cultural Competent Bridge Builder	
Martha Longenecker		(1920–2013)	2011	Historian	
Rita Sanchez		(1937–)	2011	Activist	
Gloria Harris		(1938–)	2010	Empowerer	
Judith McConnell		(1944–)	2010	Trailblazer	
Vivian Reznik		(1950–)	2010	Activist	
Laura Rodriguez		(1909–1994)	2010	Cultural Competent Bridge Builder	
Anna Prieto Sandoval		(1934–2010)	2010	Historian	
Charlotte Baker		(1855–1937)	2009	Empowerer	
Li-Rong Cheng			2009	Historian	
Joan Craigwell		(1937–)	2009	Trailblazer	
Edith Dabbs		(1918–2009)	2009	Cultural Competent Bridge Builder.	
Monique Henderson		(1983–)	2009	Spirit Of The Women's Hall Of Fame	
Marisa Ugarte		(1947–)	2009	Activist	
Kate Yavenditti		(1945–)	2009	Activist	
Bonnie Dumanis		(1951–)	2008	Spirit Of The Women's Hall Of Fame	
Sylvia Hampton			2008	Activist	
Marianne McDonald		(1937–)	2008	Empowerer	
Judith Munk		(1925–2006)	2008	Historian	
Elizabeth Riggs		(1941–)	2008	Trailblazer	
Karen Vigneault		(1958–2019)	2008	Cultural Competent Bridge Builder.	
Belle Benchley		(1882–1972)	2007	Trailblazer	
Clara Breed		(1906–1994)	2007	Cultural Competent Bridge Builder	
Joan Embrey		(1949–)	2007	Spirit Of The Women's Hall Of Fame	
Ellen Scripps		(1836–1932)	2007	Empowerer	
Patricia Shaffer		(1928–)	2007	Empowerer	
Sara Vasquez		(1910–2008)	2007	Historian	
Tanja Winter		(1927–2014)	2007	Activist	
Nona Canon			2006	Trailblazer	
Jeri Dilno		(1936–2024)	2006	Activist	
Lucy Gonzales			2006	Cultural Competent Bridge Builder	
Deborah Lindholm		(1949–)	2006	Empowerer	
Sally Ride		(1951–2012)	2006	Spirit Of The Women's Hall Of Fame	
Kate Sessions		(1857–1940)	2006	Trailblazer	
Ashley Walker		(1948–)	2006	Cultural Competent Bridge Builder	
Evelyn Clarke		(1917–2008)	2005	Historian	
Alyce Smith-Cooper		(1940–)	2005	Cultural Competent Bridge Builder	
Anne Ewing		(1930–2011)	2005	Activist	
Helen S. Hawkins		(1930–1989)	2005	Empowerer	
Ruth Heifetz		(1934–)	2005	Trailblazer	
Alice Hohlmayer		(1925–2017)	2005	Spirit Of The Women's Hall Of Fame	
Rulette Armstead		(1950–2020)	2004	Activist	
Herminia Enrique		(1919–2009)	2004	Historian	
Doris Howell		(1923–2019)	2004	Trailblazer	
Joan Kroc		(1928–2003)	2004	Cultural Competent Bridge Builder	
Mary Maschal		(1924–1998)	2004	Historian	
Gloria McClellan		(1925–2002)	2004	Activist	
Jean Stern		(1918–2011)	2004	Trailblazer	
Alice Barnes		(1907–2003)	2003	Activist	
E. Margaret Burbidge		(1919–2020)	2003	Trailblazer	
Gloria Johnson		(1937–2013)	2003	Activist	
Ardelia McClure		(1933–2013)	2003	Cultural Competent Bridge Builder	
Lilia Moreno de Lopez		(1928–)	2003	Empowerer	
Midge Neff-LeClair		(1926–2020)	2003	History	
Nancy Reeves			2003	Trailblazer	
Beverly Yip		(1932–1991)	2003	Activist	
Madge Bradley		(1904–2000)	2002	Trailblazer	
Alemi Daba		(1953–)	2002	Empowerer	
Jane Dumas		(1924–2014)	2002	Historian	
Lucy Killea	Portrait of San Diego City Council member Lucy Killea	(1922–2017)	2002	Activist	
Gracia Molina de Pick		(1928–2019)	2002	Cultural Competent Bridge Builder. Founder of IMPACT, a grass-roots civil rights organization, and of Comision Femenil Mexicana Nacional	

== Additional sources ==
- Russo, Stacy Shotsberger (2008). The Library as Place in California. McFarland & Company, Inc. ISBN 9780786431946.
