= San Diego Zoo Wildlife Alliance =

Nonprofit organization in the U.S.

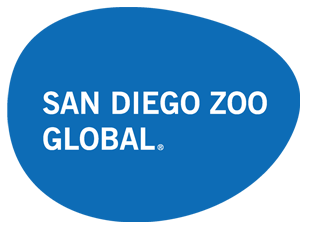
- The organization's logo, adopted in 2021
- Formerly: San Diego Zoo Global (2011–2021)
- Industry: Zoo, wildlife conservation
- Founded: December 11, 1916; 109 years ago in San Diego, California, United States
- Founders: Fred Baker; Frank Stephens; Joseph Cheesman Thompson; Harry M. Wegeforth; Paul Wegeforth
- Headquarters: San Diego, California, United States
- Areas served: Worldwide, primarily Southern California
- Revenue: 288,305,459 United States dollar (2016)
- Total assets: 870,891,979 United States dollar (2022)
- Website: sandiegozoowildlifealliance.org

The San Diego Zoo Wildlife Alliance is a nonprofit organization headquartered in San Diego, California, that operates the San Diego Zoo and the San Diego Zoo Safari Park. Founded in 1916 as the Zoological Society of San Diego under the leadership of Harry M. Wegeforth, the organization claims the largest zoological society membership in the world, with more than 250,000 member households and 130,000 child memberships, representing more than half a million people. The San Diego Zoo and San Diego Zoo Safari Park feature a combined 15,000 animals of 750 species, not all of which are displayed publicly.

In its first few decades, the Zoological Society of San Diego worked to establish and build up the San Diego Zoo. Members of the organization formed groups that later became the Association of Zoos and Aquariums (AZA) and American Association of Zoo Keepers (AAZK). In the early 1970s the society established the San Diego Wild Animal Park and the Center for Reproduction of Endangered Species (CRES). The organization changed its name to San Diego Zoo Global in 2010 as part of a rebranding that also saw the Wild Animal Park renamed to the San Diego Zoo Safari Park. The name of the organization was changed again in March 2021, to the San Diego Zoo Wildlife Alliance.

The organization's mission is to save species worldwide by uniting their expertise in animal care and conservation science with their dedication to inspiring passion for nature. It is classified as a 501(c)(3) nonprofit, and is funded by a combination of grants, donations, membership revenues, revenues from the Zoo and Safari Park, and property taxes collected by the City of San Diego. Its lands, facilities, and animals are legally owned by the city, but are exclusively managed and maintained by the San Diego Zoo Wildlife Alliance. The organization and its institutions are accredited by the AZA and the American Alliance of Museums (AAM), and have received many awards for their habitats, breeding programs, and wildlife conservation efforts.

== History ==
=== Formation ===
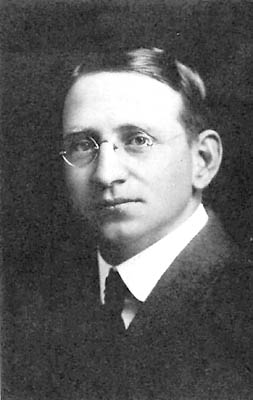
Except for a five-month absence in 1918 to serve in the Army during World War I, Dr. Harry Wegeforth was President of the Zoological Society of San Diego from its founding in 1916 until his death in 1941.

Dr. Harry M. Wegeforth, a San Diego physician, founded the Zoological Society of San Diego in 1916 with the intention of starting a zoo in the city's Balboa Park area using abandoned exotic animal exhibitions from the Isthmus portion of the 1915–16 Panama–California Exposition. Wegeforth had served on the board of directors for the Exposition in 1916, and he and his brother Paul, also a physician and surgeon, had served as surgeons for the event. By his own account, Harry Wegeforth was inspired to start a zoo after hearing the roar of a lion from one of the Exposition's exhibits:

On September 16, 1916, as I was returning to my office after performing an operation at the St. Joseph Hospital, I drove down Sixth Avenue and heard the roaring of the lions in the cages at the Exposition then being held in Balboa Park. I turned to my brother, Paul, who was riding with me, and half jokingly, half wishfully, said "Wouldn't it be splendid if San Diego had a zoo! You know...I think I'll start one." Taking me at my word, he replied that he would be glad to help me but added dubiously that he did not see how such a project could be put over on the heels of an Exposition not very successful in its second year. I had long nurtured the thought of a San Diego Zoo and now—suddenly—I decided to try to establish one.

Later that month,^{[I]} in an article in the San Diego Union, the brothers announced a call for interested parties to join them in forming a society to develop and support a zoological garden. They specifically called for local physician Fred Baker, who had co-founded the Marine Biological Institution (which later became the Scripps Institution of Oceanography), and Joseph Cheesman Thompson, a Navy neurosurgeon with an interest in entomology and herpetology:

SAN DIEGO ZOO
PLAN OF ANIMAL LIFE STUDENTS
May form Society to Support Large Collection.

Drs. Harry M. and Paul Wegeforth are interested in the promotion of a zoological society for San Diego, which will have for its object the development and support of a zoological garden to be maintained out of the funds that the society will raise through dues and subscriptions.
There are a number of physicians and scientists such as Drs. Baker, Thompson, Gregg, and Archie Talboy in this city and county, who are interested in the study of animal life and it is proposed to combine them in a nucleus which will later be developed into an efficient organization.
"We already have a good start", said Dr. Harry Wegeforth, "in the collection we have at the Exhibition. The cost of maintaining these animals is not large.
"There are tons of animals from Mexico, Central, and South America coming through our port and being distributed among cities like Chicago, New York, and San Francisco. These animals are gifts. Why can't we keep some of them here? The zoological societies trade animals with each other and we can do the same thing here when we get a surplus of any one species."

— article in the San Diego Union, September 1916

Baker and Thompson responded, and helped convince naturalist Frank Stephens, a member of the board of directors of the Natural History Society, to join as well. The five men held the first organizational meeting of the Zoological Society of San Diego on October 2, 1916, with Harry Wegeforth serving as the founding president, Thompson as vice-president, Baker as treasurer, and Paul Wegeforth as secretary. Using the by-laws and constitution of the New York Zoological Society as a model, Harry Wegeforth, Thompson, and Stephens drew up the Articles of Incorporation and by-laws for the Zoological Society of San Diego, which were submitted to Mayor Edwin M. Capps, Park Commission President George Marston, and the state and executed on December 11, 1916. The group had already received one of its first animals that November: "Caesar", a female Kodiak bear that had been kept as a mascot and pet by the crew of the USS Nanshan; having grown too large and unruly to remain aboard the ship, the bear was lent to the fledgling zoo by Captain W. D. Prideaux. By the end of the year the Zoological Society had grown to 120 members, and had raised $1,000 in four days by selling lifetime memberships at $200 apiece.

=== Establishing the San Diego Zoo ===
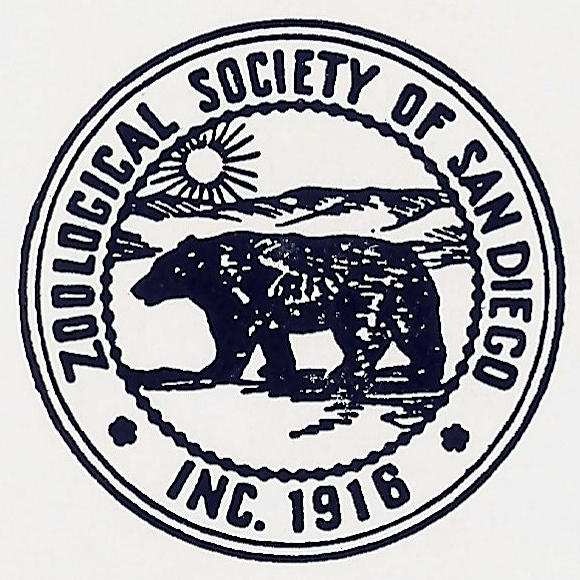
The Zoological Society's first official seal, used from 1917 to 1955, featured an image of a grizzly bear, and was replaced in response to the grizzly being declared extinct in California.

The Zoological Society's initial efforts focused on the creation of the San Diego Zoo. In January 1917 the Balboa Park Board agreed to furnish quarters in the park to establish a zoo, and to assist the society with maintenance. The Zoo began as a long row of animal homes along Park Boulevard ("little more than Menagerie Row", according to Wegeforth) for animals that had been rented for the Panama–California Exposition from a menagerie at the Wonderland Amusement Park in nearby Ocean Beach; Wonderland had gone out of business during the Exposition, and the animals were held jointly by the society, the Park Department, and the Mission Bay Corporation. Additional animals left over from the Exposition and scattered throughout Balboa Park included buffalo, deer, a pair of bears, ducks, and herds of Panama deer and elk; supervision of most of these animals was turned over to the new Zoo by the Park Department. Other early animals acquired by or donated to the Zoo included a badger, two lynxes, a gray fox, a coyote, two golden eagles, two rails, a whip snake, and a white goose. Stephens served as the active director of the Zoo during this time. The Zoological Society's first official seal was created, featuring an image of a grizzly bear (the animal depicted on the Flag of California).

I cannot remember a time in the early days of the Zoo when we were not in financial straits, and every so often these reached hazardous peaks [...] It was only by a sort of careful prestidigitation that we could meet our maintenance costs, and there was little or nothing left for the purchase of animals. To many of the people donating them we gave yearly memberships.

— Harry Wegeforth

The society faced financial challenges in maintaining the growing number of animals in their care. W. H. Porterfield of the San Diego Sun had long been interested in establishing a zoo in Balboa Park, and offered to use his newspaper to publicize the Zoo and campaign for funds. At his suggestion, the society's board of directors contacted school authorities, asking them to stimulate children to approach their parents about supporting the Zoo. Porterfield ran a contest in the Sun in conjunction with an upcoming circus, in which the newspaper gave prizes to the best children's stories about animals. He also arranged for the circus to charge children a $0.50 admission fee which would include a membership to the Junior Zoological Society; $0.12 of each admission would go to the circus, and the remaining $0.38 to the Zoological Society. Within two months the society had raised enough money to purchase the Wonderland animals from the Mission Bay Corporation. Carl H. Heilbron and David Charles Collier were also instrumental in helping the Zoo acquire the Wonderland animals.

Joseph Thompson planned much of the Zoo's education program, which included guidebooks, textbooks, and free lectures; the first such lecture was about bears, in response to Caesar's arrival. However, in April 1917 he was called away on new orders from the Navy following American entry into World War I, and resigned from the society's board of directors; he was replaced by Joseph Sefton, Jr. Paul Wegeforth resigned in mid-1917 to accept a commission in the United States Army, and was replaced by Thomas N. Faulconer. By October 1917 the society had again run out of funds, and Wegeforth organized a track and field meet between the Navy and Marine Corps, generating enough revenue from ticket sales to maintain the society through the end of the year. Another source of income was the sale of lion cubs, born to the Zoo's lionesses, to other zoos; 30 cubs were sold during the Zoo's first four years, at prices ranging from $150 to $1,500. By this time the Zoological Society was selling annual memberships at $5 apiece.

The Zoological Society struggled to find a permanent location for the Zoo within Balboa Park, negotiating with the Park Commission and promising "to furnish the best collection of animals and reptiles on the Pacific Coast" as well as to provide professional staff, scientific and descriptive labels for the animals, and free public lectures about the collection and natural history. Following a suggestion made by the city attorney, a resolution was adopted in 1918: In return for a building in Balboa Park and an as-yet-undesignated plot of ground set aside for the Zoo and for research work, the society would sell ownership of all its wildlife, equipment, and property to the Board of Park Commissioners of the City of San Diego; thus the Zoo and all its future assets would belong to the city, but would be managed and maintained by the Zoological Society, who would have jurisdiction over the permanent zoo site. "Then the Zoological Society would not legally own either the land or the animals but would be the administrative body for the Zoo," wrote Wegeforth, "retaining the right to sell or trade whatever surplus animals we deemed unnecessary for exhibition." The City Council agreed, and pledged additional funds to aid the Zoo's maintenance. In July 1918 Harry Wegeforth resigned from the board of directors to accept a commission with the Army Medical Corps, and Sefton was appointed president for almost five months before Wegeforth resumed the position, which he would retain until his death in 1941. Upon his return Wegeforth began the construction of reptile cages and started trading with and selling animals to other zoos, exchanging two brown bear cubs for a polar bear.

By late 1919 a permanent location for the Zoo had still not been secured, but sturdier housing was needed for the bears. The society set about building its first open-air, cageless exhibit along what is now Zoo Drive: a bear pit that housed Caesar, the polar bear, and a black bear, with the species separated by wire fencing. The planned concrete floor was omitted due to insufficient funds, and Caesar tunneled under the wall the first night, damaging the enclosure. Ellen Browning Scripps made the first monetary donation to the society, providing funds to improve the exhibit. The resulting design, a grotto with the floor built up to place the animals at eye level with visitors, separated from them by a moat and a low wall, became a prototype for many of the Zoo's early exhibits. The Zoological Society's first organized membership campaign was carried out during the final months of 1920.

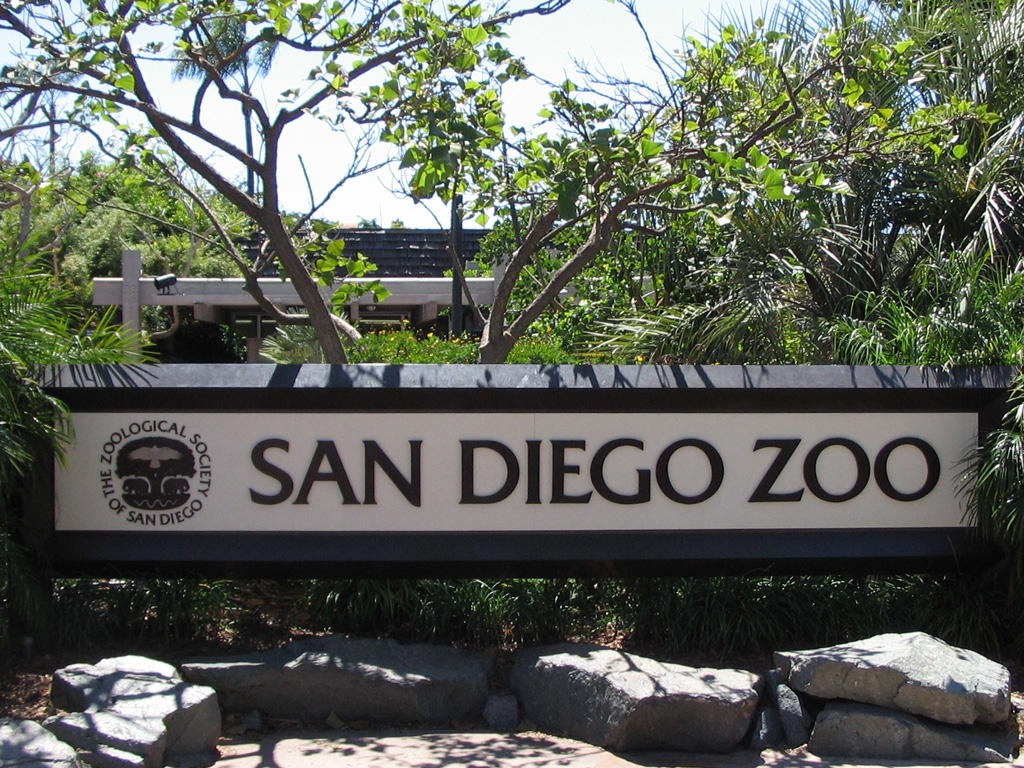
Entrance sign for the San Diego Zoo in 2005, featuring the Zoological Society of San Diego's "Tree of Life" logo used from 1974 to 2010

By 1921 the City Council appropriated $5,000 for maintenance and improvements to the Zoo, and the Zoo's current site, an area of 140 acres, was approved that fall as its permanent location. City planner Nathanial Slaymaker drew up the initial plans for the site. Wegeforth convinced many notable San Diegans to help fund the Zoo's construction, including Scripps, John D. Spreckels, George Marston, and Ralph Granger (of Granger Hall). Scripps donated $9,000 for a fence around the property, which for the first time enabled the Zoo to charge an admission fee. A formal dedication of the property was held, and much of 1922 was spent hiring staff, building exhibits and pools, and acquiring new animals, including the first live Guadalupe fur seals to be brought into the United States. Fred Baker remained on the society's board of directors until June 13, 1922.

The San Diego Zoo's grand opening occurred on January 1, 1923. The original entrance was through the Reptile House, which had been converted from the Panama–California Exposition's International Harvester Building by Louis John Gill. Admission was free for children and members of the Zoological Society (adult admission for non-members was $0.10). The San Diego Zoo now houses over 3,700 rare and endangered animals representing more than 650 species and subspecies, and a botanical collection of more than 700,000 exotic plants.

=== 1920s–1930s ===
In the decades after the San Diego Zoo's opening, the Zoological Society of San Diego focused on expanding the Zoo and its reputation. Zoonooz first appeared as a column in the San Diego Sun in 1924, written by W.B. France; in 1926 he granted the palindrome title to the society, who expanded it into a bi-monthly magazine that was free to Society members. To this day, membership in the San Diego Zoo Wildlife Alliance includes a subscription to the member magazine, which has now expanded to digital distribution as well as print and has been renamed the San Diego Zoo Wildlife Alliance Journal. In April 1924 Wegeforth created the National Association of Zoological Executives (NAZE), an affiliate of the American Institute of Park Directors, to bring together zoo directors from around the country to exchange information and animals so they would not have to go through animal dealers. "It seemed preposterous to me", he wrote, "that a group of intelligent zoo directors could not get together and work out a plan whereby they would all know what surplus stock each had available. This thought blossomed in my mind: to have them contact foreign zoos for their mutual benefit, relative to importing such animals as they wanted. And that led me logically to the hope that a number of zoos would collaborate on expeditions, prorating the animals among them [...] In addition to saving affiliated zoos tidy sums by eliminating the middlemen, the discussions and exchange of experiences proved of inestimable value." In 1966 NAZE became the American Association of Zoological Parks and Aquariums (AAZPA), a branch of the National Recreation and Park Association, and later became the Association of Zoos and Aquariums.

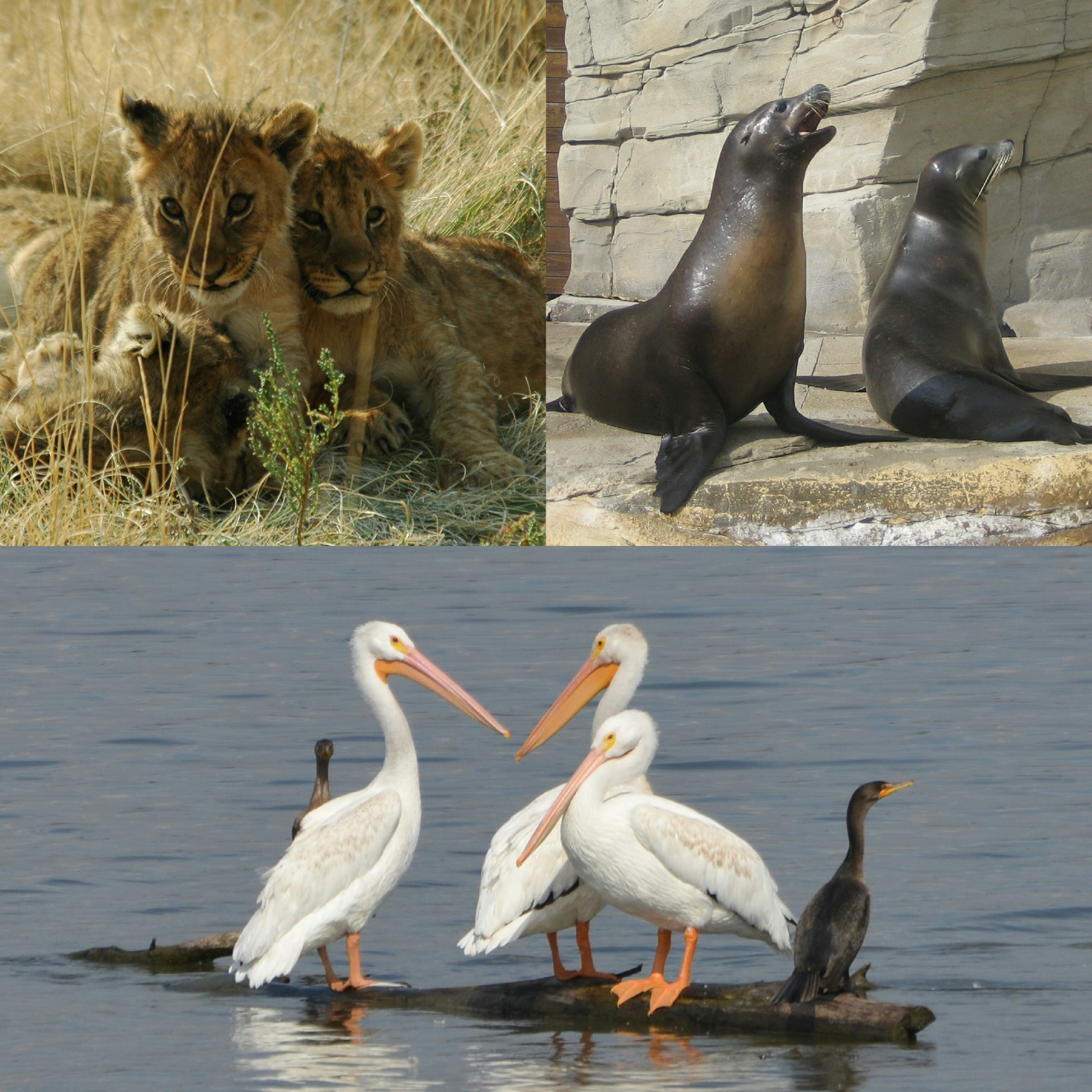
The sale and trading of lion cubs (upper left), California sea lions (upper right), and American white pelicans (bottom) was a significant source of income and animals for the Zoological Society in its early years.

The society came into conflict with two of its board members, P.F. O'Rourke and Dr. W. H. Raymenton, in 1926: Three years earlier, O'Rourke and his wife had purchased the Nevada State Building, left over from the Exposition, and paid to move it and the Standard Oil Building onto the Zoo's grounds for use as the Children's Education Center and Junior Zoological Society departments; Raymonton was appointed head of the latter. In 1926 O'Rourke resigned from the board of directors, denied his gift of the Nevada building to the society, and incorporated his own O'Rourke Institute as an educational institution, with Raymenton in possession of the building. In a 1928 issue of Zoonooz, the society accused Raymenton of plotting "to seize the organization and exploit it as his own" and O'Rourke of attempting to split the junior and senior branches of the society. The society argued that the 1918 resolution gave them jurisdiction and control over the Zoo grounds, including any buildings within; city authorities agreed, and returned control of the building to the society in 1939.

In 1926 Ellen Browning Scripps donated $50,000 to the society to build a Hospital and Biological Research Institute, which opened the following year. After several unsuccessful attempts to hire a satisfactory director or superintendent for the Zoo, the board of directors decided to adopt an operating practice used by the London Zoo, appointing an Executive Secretary to work under them, whom they could train to manage the Zoo's day-to-day operations. Belle Benchley, who had started working for the Zoo as a temporary bookkeeper in 1925, was appointed to the position; her title was soon changed to Director, making her the only woman director of a zoo in the world, a position she held until her retirement in 1953. She also served as president of the AAZPA from 1949 to 1950. Remarking on the role of the society in relation to the Zoo in 1934, she stated "The chief function of the Zoological Society is to maintain public interest in the Zoo at all times and to prevent its being used as a political cat's paw by unscrupulous politicians." In order to stave off anti-captivity protests, three members of San Diego Humane Society were admitted to the Zoological Society to handle animal welfare complaints, conduct weekly inspections, and make recommendations. Humane Society State President Daniel Wray was made a member of the Zoological Society's board of directors, but resigned the position due to complaints of conflict of interest.

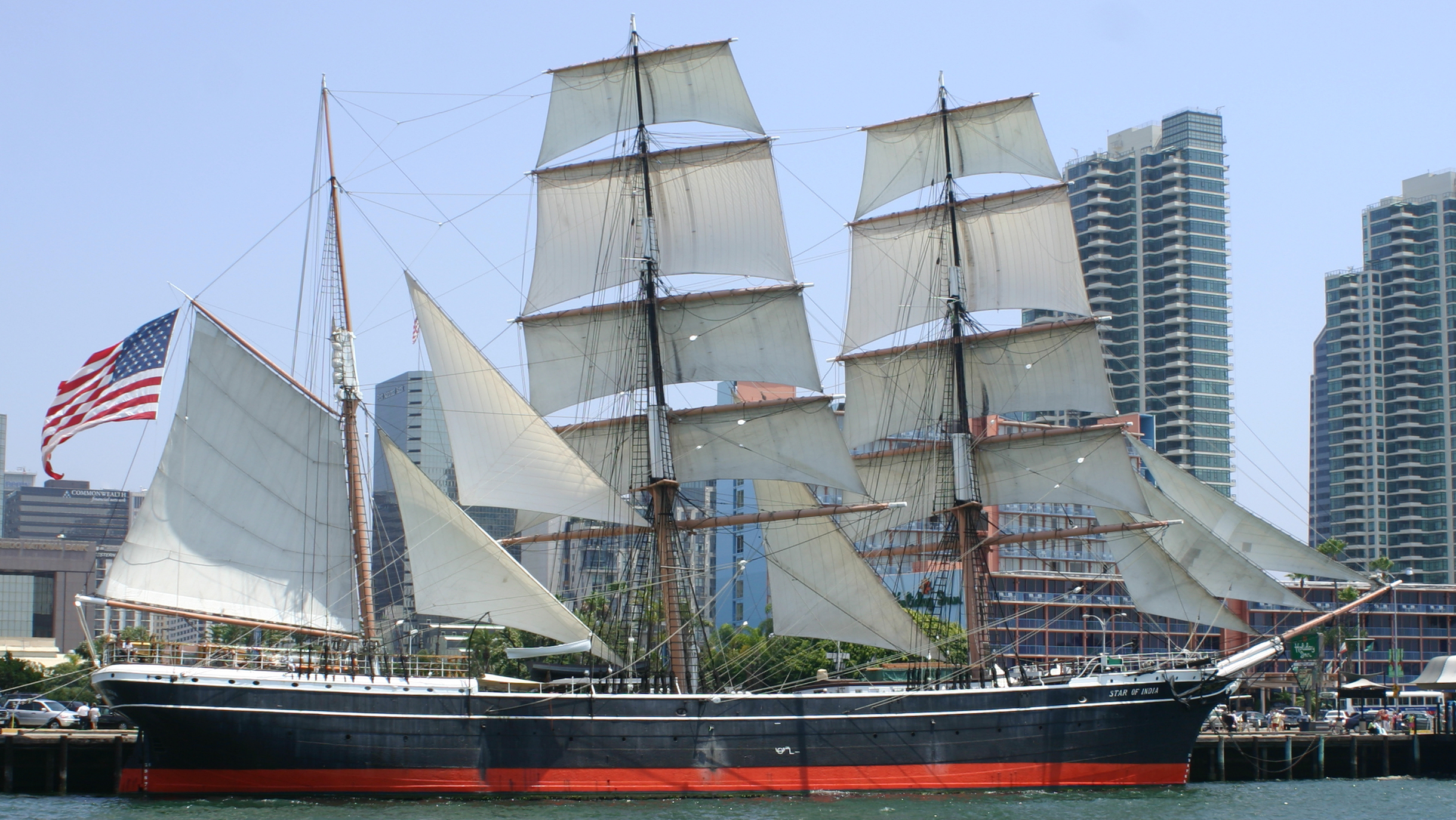
The sailing ship Star of India was donated to the society in 1927 for a proposed aquarium and maritime museum that never materialized.

In 1927 the sailing ship Star of India was donated to the Zoological Society for a maritime museum and first unit of a proposed aquarium. Plans were made for a site on San Diego Bay at the Marina, with the ship to be set in concrete in the midst of a seal pool adjacent to a raised-relief map of California and a series of aquariums. Donations were promised to fund the project, but the society could not reach an agreement with city officials on a suitable location; the Star of India eventually became part of the Maritime Museum of San Diego. The Zoological Society continued to secure finances to expand the Zoo, adding new animals and habitats and financing collection expeditions to Australia, the Galápagos Islands, and Guadalupe Island. A significant source of income for the society at this time was the sale of California sea lions, captured by local fishermen, to other zoos and circuses around the country; this also led to the Zoo hiring an animal trainer and beginning sea lion shows in 1928, and the sea lion soon became the society's most lucrative animal. American white pelicans, collected from a rookery in the Salton Sea, were also traded to other zoos in exchange for new bird species.

Personally, I think the struggle to finance the Zoo is one of the most exciting features of our growth; certainly, it is the keynote to the history of the Zoo's existence [...] Our main reservoir, of course, was donations from well-to-do and public-spirited persons [...] Only during the late thirties was the Zoo able to avoid large debts. This financial security was due largely to the increased attendance as the fame of the Zoo spread and to the special tax voted by the people of San Diego toward the support of the Zoo.

— Harry Wegeforth

During the 1920s and early 1930s the Zoological Society proposed several ballot measures aimed at securing the Zoo's real estate and finances, since both were still uncertain. Two ballot propositions were voted on in 1925: one to designate the grounds exclusively for Zoo purposes, the other requesting that $0.02 from every $100 collected in property taxes by the City of San Diego be given to the Zoo; both failed to pass. The issues were raised again in 1927 as three propositions: one for the tax, one for permanent granting of the grounds, and another asking that jurisdiction of the land be transferred from the Board of Park Commissioners to the Zoological Society; all three passed, but were not implemented because they had not been published within the requisite number of days prior to the election. In 1929 only the tax amendment was proposed; it passed, but was omitted when San Diego switched from a mayor–council government to a council–manager government. In 1934 the society made a concerted effort to pass the tax amendment, using Zoonooz to promote their cause, having Benchley present their case at over 200 meetings, and circulating a petition to put the proposition on the ballot. It passed, and has been in force ever since.

=== 1940s–1960s ===
The corporate seal of the society from 1955 to 1974 depicted a northern elephant seal.

Wegeforth, the last of the Zoological Society's founders to remain on its board of directors, died in June 1941; he was succeeded as president by Lester T. Olmstead. Following the attack on Pearl Harbor and the United States' entry into World War II, the Zoological Society focused on managing the Zoo through the difficult war years. "That the Zoo survived the first, hysterical months after Pearl Harbor—economically and personnel-wise—was due to careful planning and organization and strong leadership", wrote San Diego author and journalist Neil Morgan. "Zoos and parks throughout the West Coast were hard-hit by the war scare, and some others were closed." Though attendance at the Zoo dropped after the outbreak of the war, it rose dramatically through the rest of the decade, averaging 500,000–600,000 visitors annually as San Diego's population boomed due to the presence of many military installations and defense manufacturers, and topping 800,000 by 1948. A visit to the Zoo by officials of the New York Zoological Society in 1944 earned praise from its president, Henry Fairfield Osborn, Jr., particularly for the Biological Research Institute and Zoological Hospital. Following the war, the Ellen Browning Scripps Foundation gave a grant to the society for the Research Institute and Hospital to conduct research in the fields of bacteriology, parasitology, and pathology.

By 1951, annual attendance at the Zoo exceeded one million visitors. Then-President of the Zoological Society Laurence Monroe Klauber retired that year, and was succeeded by Robert J. Sullivan. In 1955, in response to the grizzly bear being declared extinct in California, the society changed its corporate seal to one depicting a northern elephant seal. The organization was granted membership in the International Union for Conservation of Nature in 1957. In 1963 the society worked with the government of the Malagasy Republic to establish a conservation program for lemurs at the San Diego Zoo. In 1966, its fiftieth year, the society hosted the first international conference on "The Role of Zoos in International Conservation of Wild Animals", and presented its first conservation awards. The following year, seven zookeepers from the San Diego Zoo formed the San Diego Zoo Keepers' Association, which later became the American Association of Zoo Keepers.

=== Establishing the Wild Animal Park ===
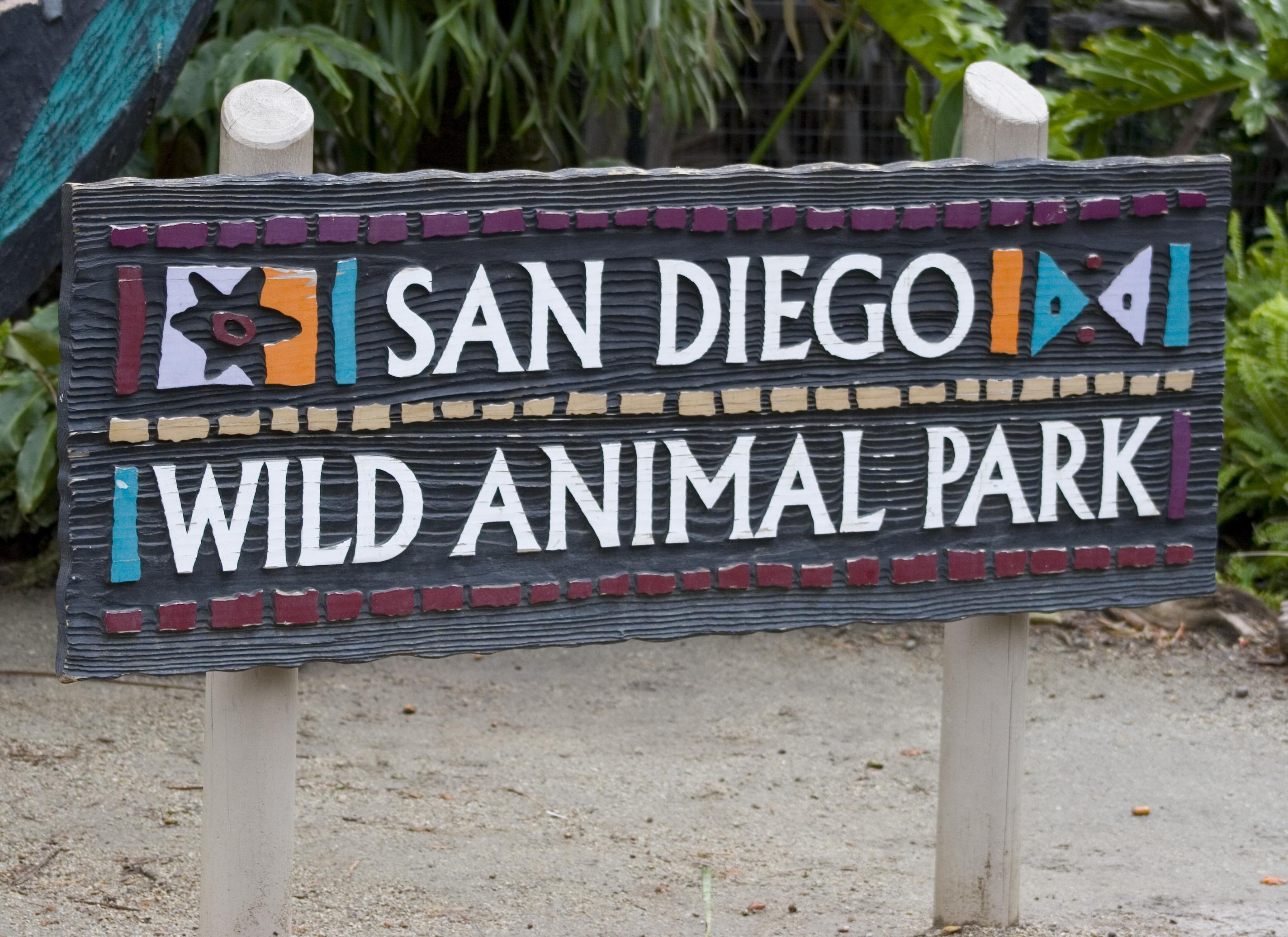
Entrance sign for the Wild Animal Park in 2008

In the late 1950s, Dr. Charles Schroeder, who had replaced Belle Benchley as Director of the San Diego Zoo after her retirement, had the idea to develop a "country zoo", an expansive animal farm where rare and endangered animals could be relocated from the somewhat-crowded Zoo and have space to roam, which would encourage breeding. He began searching for a suitable location in 1959, envisioning a facility with few public amenities and estimating the cost of construction at $1 million. The Zoological Society's board of directors opposed the idea, saying it would be too costly, and some even threatened to fire Schroeder if he did not drop the subject. Schroeder persisted, however, and a site in San Diego's San Pasqual Valley, about 30 miles northeast of the Zoo, was chosen in 1962. In May 1969 then-Society president Anderson Borthwick signed an agreement with Mayor Francis Earl Curran to establish a wildlife preserve and "natural environment zoo" on the site, and ground was broken on 1,800 acres of land leased by the Zoo from the city. The new facility received its first animals—South African sable antelope, greater kudu, and gemsbok—in January 1970. A ballot measure was voted on that November, proposing a $6 million municipal bond through which the city of San Diego would assist the society in "the acquisition, construction, and completion of facilities to provide recreational, educational, scientific, ecological, and research facilities in harmony with the open space concept of the valley". The measure passed with 75.9% support from San Diego voters, and the society repaid the bond in full, plus interest, in subsequent years. Over $10 million was spent to construct the park, with the remainder coming from the society's funds.

Schroeder himself staked out the route for the Wgasa Bush Line, a monorail-type people mover tram that took visitors on a 5-mile, 50-minute tour of the park. A grant from the William H. Donner Foundation enabled the park to purchase ten adult South African cheetahs from southwest Africa and build two 5-acre enclosures for a cheetah reproductive behavior research project. Eighteen southern white rhinoceros, eight born at the San Diego Zoo and ten purchased through Ian Player, chief conservator of the Republic of South Africa, were added to the park in February 1971, as were thirty ostriches donated by the president of a local car dealership. The San Diego Wild Animal Park (later renamed the San Diego Zoo Wild Animal Park) opened to the public May 10, 1972, receiving 3,000 visitors on its first day. As with the San Diego Zoo, admission to the Wild Animal Park was free to Zoological Society members and to children 15 years and younger. Schroeder retired as Zoo Director later the same month. That fall the Park had its first white rhinoceros calf birth, and added a herd of six Arabian oryx. The Park's first hatching of an Abyssinian ground hornbill also occurred that year, for which the Park received the Edward H. Bean Award from the AAZPA for "a truly significant captive propagation effort that clearly enhances the conservation of the species" in 1974.

The Wild Animal Park (now named the San Diego Zoo Safari Park; see #Rebranding below) now houses over 2,600 animals representing more than 300 species, and a botanical collection of 1.5 million specimens representing 3,500 plant species. Over half of the park's 1,800 acres (730 hectares) is set aside as protected native species habitat for the California coastal sage and chaparral ecoregion.

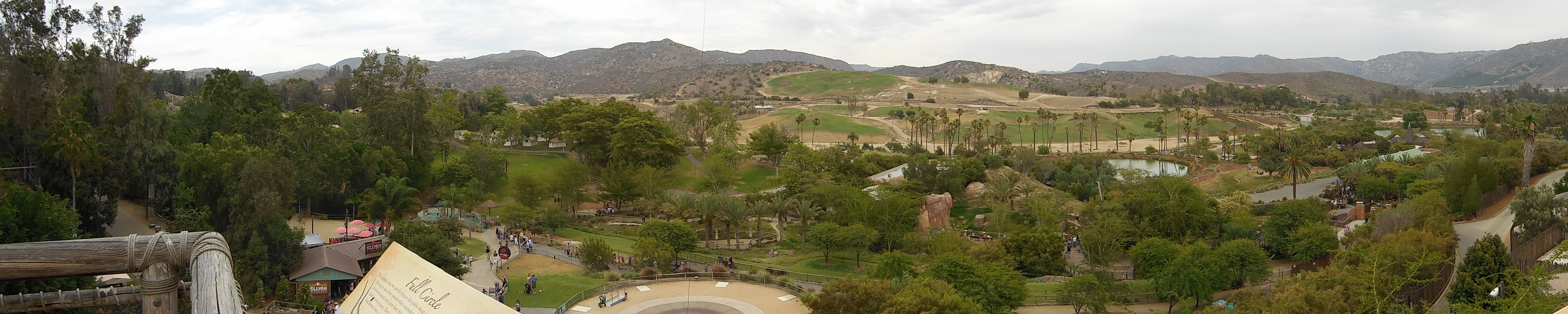
A portion of the San Diego Zoo Safari Park in 2015. The image description page includes labels of various attractions.

=== Conservation Science ===
In the early 1970s, Dr. Kurt Benirschke, a Professor of Reproductive Medicine and Pathology at the University of California, San Diego, became chairman of the university's advisory committee to the Zoological Society dealing with research and animal reproduction. He organized the committee to prepare a white paper describing the need for in-house research to examine the problems of breeding and sustaining endangered species populations in managed care. In 1975 Benirschke and then-San Diego Zoo Director Charles Bieler established a new research department at the Zoo with Benirschke as its director. Originally based in the Zoo's Biological Research Institute built 49 years prior, the department eventually expanded under the leadership of Dr. Allison Alberts to eight research- and education-centered divisions—Recovery Ecology, Plant Conservation, Population Sustainability, Conservation Genetics, Reproductive Sciences, Disease Investigations, Community Engagement, and Biodiversity Banking—employing over 200 scientists participating in more than 160 conservation studies and projects in 35 countries.

In 1965 Benirschke had started collecting and freezing fibroblast cells from a wide variety of animals. This project was institutionalized and expanded into an extensive collection of genetic material from endangered species, stored in liquid nitrogen for use in genetic research and future propagation of the species, and the term "frozen zoo" was coined. The collection, now known as the Wildlife Biodiversity Bank, includes sperm, ova, and embryos from over 300 species, the largest such collection in the world.

The San Diego Zoo Wildlife Alliance has partnered with the United States Fish and Wildlife Service (USFWS) on many projects, beginning in the 1980s with the effort to recover the California condor population, which had been reduced to 22 individuals and been declared critically endangered (see California condor#Recovery plan). A condor breeding center and program was set up at the Wild Animal Park, and the remaining wild condors were captured and brought to the Wild Animal Park and the Los Angeles Zoo, with the last known wild specimen brought to the Wild Animal Park on April 19, 1987. Through breeding and reintroduction to the wild, the California condor population had increased to 425 by October 2014, with 219 in the wild and 206 in zoos.

In 1982, conservation scientists from the San Diego Zoo Wildlife Alliance and scientists from the University of California, Berkeley collaborated to isolate DNA from 150-year-old quagga skin. A polymerase chain reaction was first used by the organization's scientists to amplify DNA in 1988. Their work also contributed to reproductive successes with cheetahs, Indian rhinoceros, southern white rhinoceros, and Przewalski's horses during the 1980s. In 1990 researchers produced the first pheasant hatched from artificial insemination with frozen semen. In 1996 the organization received six Jamaican iguanas, joining five other American zoos as an off-site breeding colony for the species, which had been thought to be extinct but was rediscovered in 1990. The organization's pathology department opened the first zoo-based molecular diagnostics laboratory in 1999. The following year, the San Diego Zoo Wildlife Alliance added twelve post-doctoral fellowships and hosted an international conference on "Genetic Resources for the New Century".

Also in 2000 the society received a $7.5 million grant, the largest in its history, from the Arnold and Mabel Beckman Foundation to build a new conservation science complex on the Wild Animal Park property. "Because the [conservation science] staff and projects have increased significantly since the [department] was founded 25 years ago, we desperately need new research facilities", said Benirschke, who was then president of the Zoological Society. "The generous Beckman Foundation grant is an incredible beginning to building our new facility and will enable us to continue leading the world in research and wildlife conservation efforts." The $22 million, 50,000 square foot Arnold and Mabel Beckman Center for Reproduction of Endangered Species opened in November 2004 as a second phase of the $20 million, 64,000 square foot Paul Harter Veterinary Medical Center, which had opened in 2001 on the Wild Animal Park property.

In the 2000s, San Diego Zoo Wildlife Alliance conservation scientists made further strides in the field of genetics. In 2003, skin cells from the organization's Wildlife Biodiversity Bank were used to clone a healthy male banteng (the animal went to live at the San Diego Zoo the following year). In 2005 the conservation scientists successfully cultured cells of the poʻouli, a critically endangered and possibly extinct Hawaiian bird, for storage in the Wildlife Biodiversity Bank. That same year, the San Diego Zoo Wildlife Alliance joined the National Zoological Park, Fossil Rim Wildlife Center, White Oak Conservation Center, and The Wilds to form Conservation Centers for Species Survival. The organization hosted the first State of Endangered Species Symposium in 2006, and began an effort to rescue the endangered California mountain yellow-legged frog. 2007 saw the San Diego Zoo Wildlife Alliance partner with the Gary and Jerri-Ann Jacobs High Tech High Charter School, and the formation of a new Plant Conservation Division which partnered with San Diego Botanic Garden to start a seed bank for native species. Another partnership with USFWS, begun in 2009, saw the San Diego Zoo Wildlife Alliance and USWFS assume operations of the Desert Tortoise Conservation Center in Las Vegas, which relocated 36 desert tortoises to the wild near Las Vegas in 2011.

=== 1970s–2000s ===
The "Tree of Life" insignia was used by the society from 1974 to 2010.

During the 1970s and 1980s the Zoological Society turned much of its attention to breeding and wildlife conservation efforts, establishing a number of conservation projects at the Zoo and Wild Animal Park. In 1974 the society adopted a new official seal, the "Tree of Life" insignia featuring images of a bird, a snake, a tree, and two elephants. The Jennings Center for Zoological Medicine was opened at the San Diego Zoo the following year, adding a clinical building to the animal hospital. In 1985 the society approved the first long-range strategic plan in its 69-year history; the plan included establishing an Internal Conservation Committee, and rebuilding areas of the Zoo in "bio-climate" zones with multi-species enclosures that integrate plants and animals from specific regions to more closely resemble native habitats. The 67th annual AAZPA conference was hosted by the Zoological Society in 1991. In 1993 the society was one of only five zoological institutions in the United States to receive American Museum Accreditation. 1998 saw the adoption of a new strategic plan involving renovating older exhibits and building new ones.

The society hosted the second annual Animal Behavior Management Conference in 2002, and was named San Diego's "Recycler of the Year" in 2004. In 2006 the society established a new foundation for its key fundraising efforts. The following year the society adopted a new strategic plan, which included new master plans for the Zoo and Wild Animal Park.

In 2008 the society found a need to rethink its business model. Despite an operating profit of $13 million in the face of the 2008 financial crisis, attendance at the Zoo and Wild Animal Park was not rising as fast as the organization's costs, and the parks' revenues and donations would no longer be sufficient to fund the society's conservation research and educational initiatives. Hiring Jump Associates, a consulting firm, the society sought to identify new revenue streams to fund its conservation efforts, and to develop a sustainable growth strategy. To build its strengths and credibility, the society began hosting more environmental conferences and forming new partnerships to share its in-house knowledge with other organizations, including a partnership with Polar Bears International to form a Conservation Alliance to protect polar bears, and hosting the first annual Biomimicry / Bioinspiration Conference; the 2009 Biomimicry Symposium, a partnership with Point Loma Nazarene University, was a sold-out event. The society also sought to connect with younger consumers by increasing its online content, and to appeal to ecotourism seekers by adding new attractions at its parks, such as a zip-line experience at the Wild Animal Park. The society also expanded its consulting business, partnering with the Al Ain Zoo and Aquarium Public Institution to assist in the creation of a 2,000-acre wildlife park in Abu Dhabi, and started using its facilities to showcase sustainable products and technologies to visitors. A formal program for volunteer interpreters at the Zoo and Wild Animal Park was also started.

=== Rebranding ===
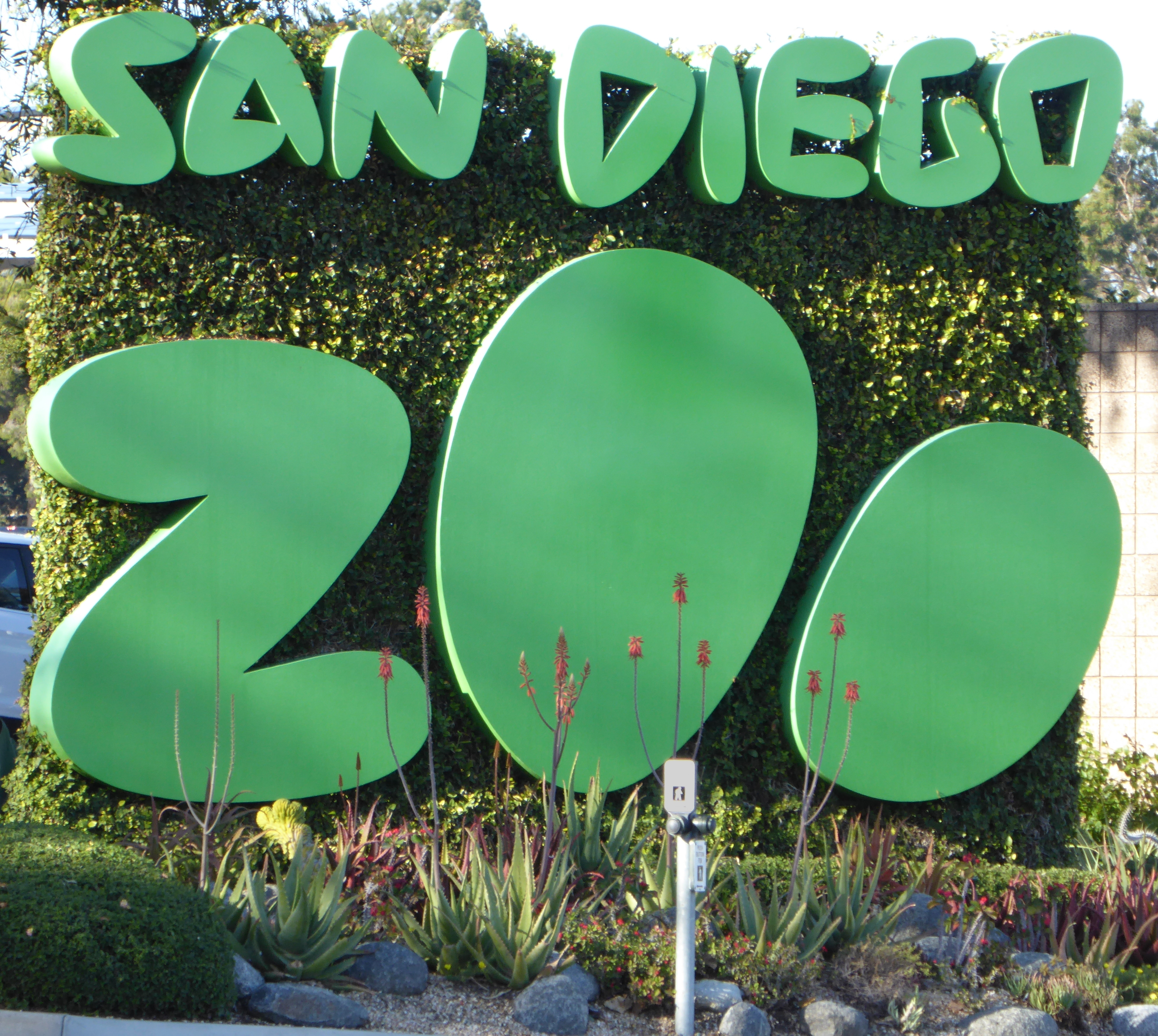

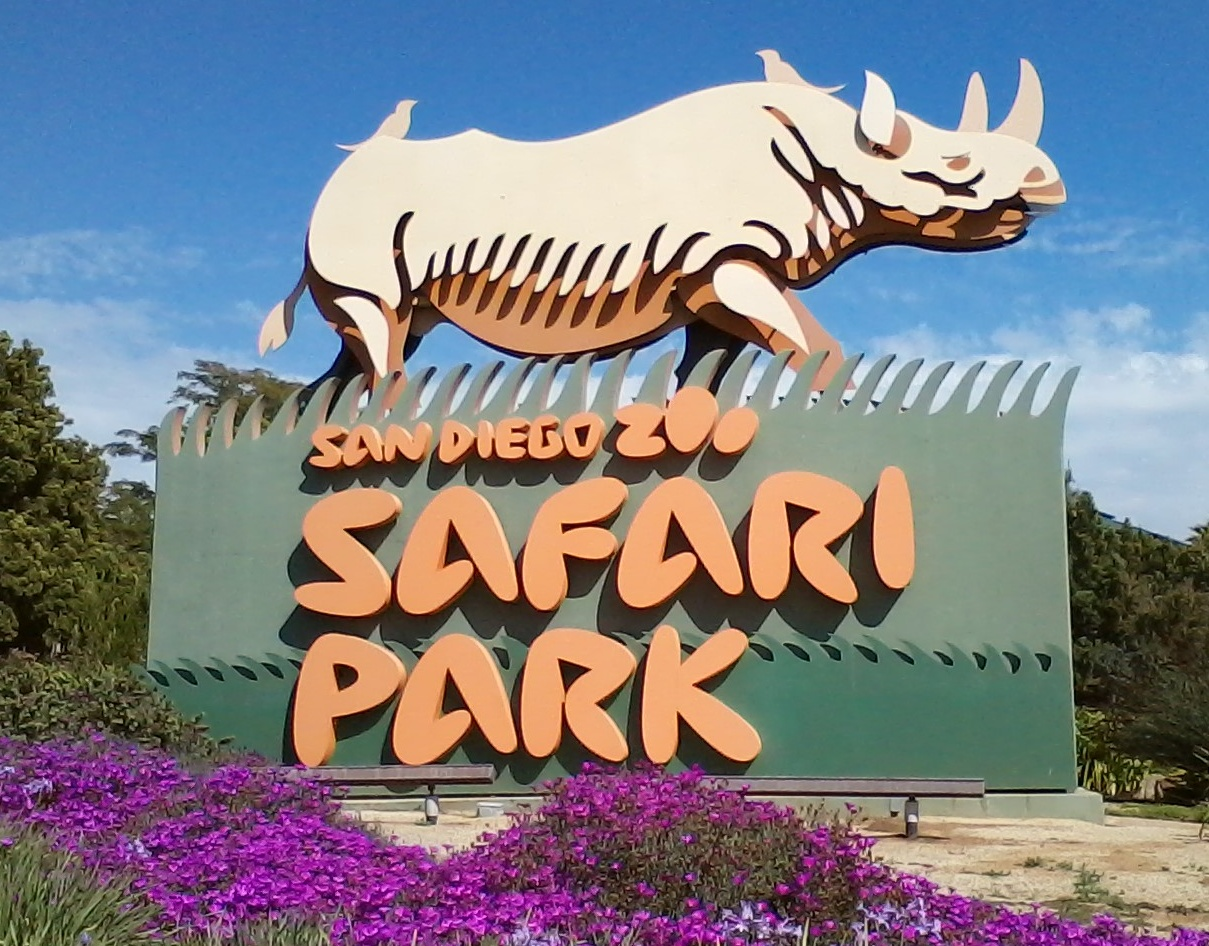
The (in 2016) street entrance signs for the San Diego Zoo (top) and (in 2014) San Diego Zoo Safari Park (bottom) placed after the rebranding, displaying the parks' new branding and logos

Beginning in its 93rd year, the Zoological Society of San Diego underwent a rebranding, with all branches of the organization being renamed with the exception of the San Diego Zoo, and all receiving new logos. In June 2010 the society's board of trustees approved rebranding the rest of the organization's facilities. The San Diego Zoo Wild Animal Park became the San Diego Zoo Safari Park: "This allows us to more easily communicate the differences between the Zoo and the Safari Park", said Debra Erickson, Director of Communications and Interpretation for the society. "People outside of San Diego County didn't understand what a Wild Animal Park was and why, if they visited the world-famous San Diego Zoo, they needed to visit the Wild Animal Park. 'Safari Park' says it all: You go to the Safari Park to take one of a variety of safaris." The Zoological Society of San Diego was renamed San Diego Zoo Global, the umbrella title for the entire organization: "Individuals had an impossible time remembering the corporate name of the organization", said Erickson. "'San Diego Zoo Global' connotes that we are a zoo that works around the world."

Summary of the rebranding name changes:

- Zoological Society of San Diego → San Diego Zoo Global
- San Diego Zoo → San Diego Zoo (no change)
- San Diego Zoo Wild Animal Park → San Diego Zoo Safari Park

The rebranding also created a new program, the San Diego Zoo Global Wildlife Conservancy, intended to unify and raise the profile of the conservation efforts pursued by the Zoo, Safari Park, and the conservation science department. According to Erickson, the Conservancy "helps us communicate that we are more than a zoo; we are a wildlife conservation organization." One of the Conservancy's first initiatives was a partnership with Nature and Culture International, begun in 2011, to assume operation of the Cocha Cashu Biological Station in Peru's Manu National Park. The following year the Conservancy collaborated with the University of Sydney and James Cook University to use whole genome sequencing to better understand the genetic fitness of koala populations.

=== 2010s ===
In 2010, San Diego Zoo Global hosted a conference of world experts to discuss "The Future of Zoos". For 2011 the organization reported its number of card-carrying members at 530,740, and combined attendance for the Zoo and Safari Park at nearly 5 million. In 2012 the organization partnered with the Autonomous University of Baja California's school of veterinary medicine to aid the California Condor Recovery Program in Mexico. The San Diego Zoo Academy, an internet-based training program for animal care staff worldwide, was launched that year. San Diego Zoo Global celebrated its centennial in 2016, with themed events at the Zoo and Balboa Park.

=== 2020s ===
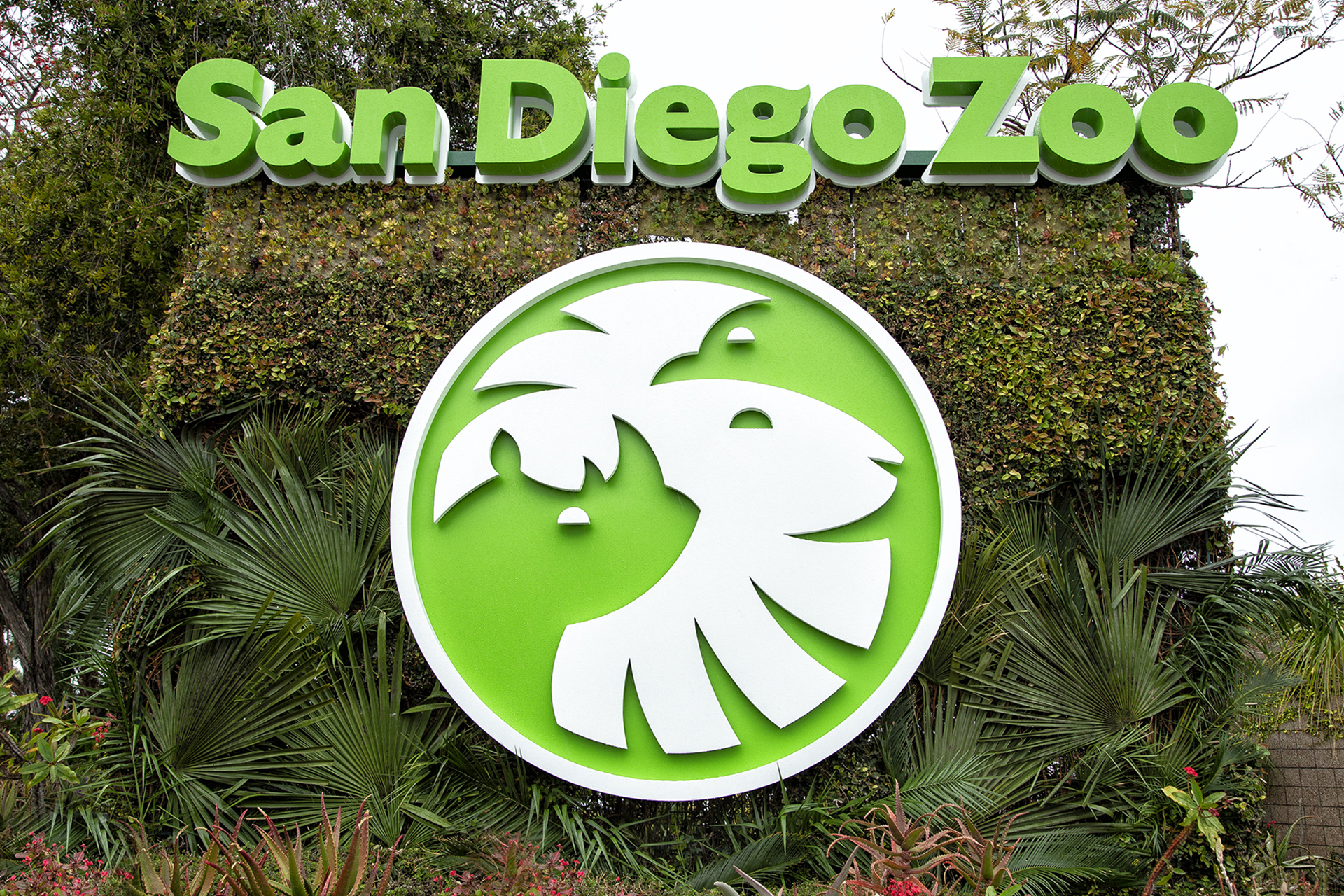
Updated sign on Park Boulevard

In March 2021 the organization changed its name from San Diego Zoo Global to the San Diego Zoo Wildlife Alliance. Former CEO Paul Baribault said the new name better reflects the nonprofit group's focus on conservation and the interconnectedness of animal and human health. While it is best known for its two conservation parks, the organization also supports wildlife conservation and research projects around the world. The rebrand coincided with a new visual identity that incorporated three animals that represent the San Diego Zoo Wildlife Alliance century-long conservation efforts: the lion, the California condor and the white rhino.

== Funding ==
The San Diego Zoo Wildlife Alliance is a nonprofit organization classified as 501(c)(3), making it tax-exempt according to the Internal Revenue Service. The organization is funded through grants, membership revenue, and from sales of tickets, merchandise, and food at the Zoo and Safari Park. Additionally, the San Diego Zoo Wildlife Alliance receives revenues from property taxes collected by the City of San Diego, the result of a proposition passed in 1934 that allows the organization to receive $0.02 from every $100 collected in property taxes, to be used for maintenance of zoological exhibits at the San Diego Zoo. By 2015 this amounted to approximately $12 million a year, out of the organization's total annual earnings of almost $270 million. The largest grant in the organization's history came in 2000: $7.5 million from the Arnold and Mabel Beckman Foundation, which went toward the construction of the Arnold and Mabel Beckman Center for Conservation Research on the Wild Animal Park property. The largest individual donation to the organization came in 2004: $10 million from the estate of Joan Kroc, which was used in part to finance a renovation project at the Zoo which included a new habitat, Joan B. Kroc's Monkey Trails and Forest Tales, named in Kroc's honor.

Charity Navigator, an independent nonprofit corporation that evaluates charities in the United States, has given the San Diego Zoo Wildlife Alliance an overall rating of four stars, its highest rating. For the 2022 fiscal year (the most recent period examined), Charity Navigator gave the San Diego Zoo Wildlife Alliance a score of 100 out of 100 for 'Accountability & Finance', reporting the organization's total revenues at $392,443,880 and its expenses at $352,421,424, resulting in an excess of $40,022,456. The report indicated that 89.9% of its expenses went toward operating its programs, 7.3% to administration, and 2.8% to fundraising.

== Awards ==
The San Diego Zoo Wildlife Alliance has received many awards for its exhibits, programs, and conservation efforts. This list includes only awards given to the parent organization, not to the institutions it operates; for those, see San Diego Zoo#Awards and San Diego Zoo Safari Park#Awards.

| Year | Awarding body | Award | Notes |
|---|---|---|---|
| 1993 | American Association of Zoological Parks and Aquariums (AAZPA) | Significant Achievement Award | For conservation of the San Clemente loggerhead shrike |
| 1993 | American Association of Zoological Parks and Aquariums (AAZPA) | Conservation Endowment Fund Award | For wild canid reproductive strategies (shared with 9 recipients) |
| 1995 | Association of Zoos and Aquariums (AZA) | Conservation Endowment Fund Award | For Species Survival Plan for tree-kangaroo |
| 1995 | Association of Zoos and Aquariums (AZA) | Conservation Endowment Fund Award | For Avian Tuberculosis Research Project (shared with Woodland Park Zoo) |
| 2002 | AZA | Top Honors in North American Conservation | For Hawai'i Endangered Bird Conservation Program |
| 2002 | AZA | Top Honors in International Conservation | For Tree Kangaroo Conservation Program (shared with Roger Williams Park Zoo, Calgary Zoological Society, Columbus Zoo and Aquarium, Gladys Porter Zoo, Kangaroo Conservation Center, Miami MetroZoo, Milwaukee County Zoo, Oregon Zoo, Philadelphia Zoo, Pittsburgh Zoo & PPG Aquarium, Riverbanks Zoo and Garden, San Antonio Zoo and Aquarium, Santa Fe Community Teaching College, and Woodland Park Zoo) |
| 2004 | Institute of Museum and Library Services (IMLS) | National Award for Museum Service | For educational programs |
| 2004 | City of San Diego | Recycler of the Year | |
| 2012 | AZA | Significant Achievement in North American Conservation | For Light-footed clapper rail recovery program (shared with SeaWorld San Diego) |
| 2012 | AZA | Top Honors in International Conservation | For Scientific Approaches to Conservation of Giant Pandas and their Habitat program (shared with Smithsonian National Zoological Park, Memphis Zoo, and Zoo Atlanta) |
| 2012 | AZA | Significant Achievement in International Conservation | For Grévy's Zebra Trust and AZA: A Model of Collaborative Endangered Species Collaboration (shared with Saint Louis Zoo, Brevard Zoo, Cheyenne Mountain Zoo, Chicago Zoological Society, Cleveland Zoo, Dallas Zoo, Denver Zoo, Detroit Zoo, Disney Worldwide Conservation Fund and Rapid Relief Fund, Fresno Chaffee Zoo, White Oak Conservation Center, Jackson Zoo, Jacksonville Zoo, Los Angeles Zoo, Living Desert, Oklahoma City Zoo, Oregon Zoo, Phoenix Zoo, Reid Park Zoo's Zoo Teens Program, Riverbanks Zoo, Sacramento Zoo, Safari West, SeaWorld / Busch Gardens, Sedgwick County Zoo, Toronto Zoo, and Utah's Hogle Zoo) |
| 2014 | AZA | Top Honors for Excellence in Marketing | For Welcome to Koalafornia: The New Australian Outback marketing campaign |

== Gold Conservation Medal ==
In 1966, during the Zoological Society of San Diego's golden jubilee, the organization created the Gold Conservation Medal as an award given to outside parties. Nine medals were awarded that year, and it has since been customary to award two each year, one to an international figure and one to a regional figure. In 1971 the society established a set of criteria for selecting recipients, declaring that the medals should be awarded to "individuals who, through research and publication, have furthered knowledge of the habits and habitats of wildlife, [...] who have been active in the preservation of endangered and other species of animals through breeding programs, research, and the establishment of game and wildlife preserves, [... and] who have furthered the cause of conservation through continued financial support and through their influence and publicity." In 2008 the Conservation Award was expanded to include four categories: Lifetime Achievement, Conservation in Action, Conservation Advocate, and Young Conservationist. Several Conservation Medals have been awarded posthumously. Recipients include:

| Year | Recipient(s) |
|---|---|
| 1966 | Jean Théodore Delacour – Director Emeritus of Los Angeles County Museum of Natural History, founder of Cleres Sanctuary; Edward Hallstrom – Executive Director of Taronga Zoo; Henry Fairfield Osborn, Jr. – President of New York Zoological Society; Harold Jefferson Coolidge, Jr., Ph.D. – President of International Union for Conservation of Nature and Natural Resources (IUCN); Maj. Ian B. Grimwood – Wildlife Adviser for the British Ministry of Overseas Development to the government of Peru; Dr. Boonsong Lekagul – Secretary-General of Association for Conservation of Wildlife, Thailand; Perez Olindo – Director of National Parks, Kenya; Ian Player – Chief Conservator of Natal Parks Game and Fish Preservation Board; Peter Scott – Director of Wildfowl Trust, Vice President of World Wildlife Fund (WWF), Chairman of IUCN Survival Service Commission |
| 1967–69 | no medals awarded |
| 1970 | Carl Leavitt Hubbs, Ph.D. – Professor at the Scripps Institution of Oceanography, Vice President of Zoological Society of San Diego; George Schaller, Ph.D. – Research Associate at Institute for Research in Animal Behavior, New York Zoological Society and Rockefeller University |
| 1971 | Carl W. Kenyon – Biologist of Wildlife Research for United States Fish and Wildlife Service (USFWS); Charles Shaw – Asst. Director and Reptile Curator at the San Diego Zoo (posthumously); Lewis W. Walker – Asst. Director Emeritus of Arizona-Sonora Desert Museum (posthumously) |
| 1972 | Philip L. Boyd – Founder of Deep Canyon Desert Research Center in Palm Desert, California; Col. Mervyn Cowie – Founder of Kenya National Parks System |
| 1973 | Gerald Durrell – Founder and Director of Jersey Wildlife Preservation Trust; Margaret Owings – conservationist, Founder of Friends of the Sea Otter |
| 1974 | Jane Goodall, Ph.D. – Director of Gombe Stream Research Center, Tanzania; Prof. Dr. Heini Hediger – Director Emeritus of Zürich Zoologischer Garten |
| 1975 | Prof. Dr. h.c. Bernhard Grzimek – Director Emeritus of Frankfurt Zoological Garden; Roland Lindemann – Catskill Game Farm |
| 1976 | Kenton C. Lint – Curator of San Diego Zoo; Charles Schroeder, D.V.M. – Director Emeritus of San Diego Zoo |
| 1977 | Prof. Dr. Ernst M. Lang – Director of Zoo Basel; Maurice A. Machris – Shikar-Safari Club, Founder of World Herd of Arabian Oryx |
| 1978 | no medals awarded |
| 1979 | William G. Conway – General Director of Bronx Zoo; Ray C. Erickson, Ph.D. – Asst. Director for Endangered Wildlife Research at Patuxent Wildlife Research Center; Craig C. McFarland, Ph.D. – Head of Wildlands Management Unit in Turrialba, Costa Rica |
| 1980 | no medals awarded |
| 1981 | Kenhelm W. Stott, Jr. – General Curator Emeritus of San Diego Zoo, author, explorer; Prof. Dr. Heinrich Dathe – Director of Tierpark Berlin |
| 1982 | no medals awarded |
| 1983 | HRH Prince Philip, Duke of Edinburgh – President of WWF, patron of Zoological Society of London |
| 1984 | no medals awarded |
| 1985 | Prof. Dr. Heinz-Georg Klos – General Director of Berlin Zoological Garden and Aquarium Berlin |
| 1986 | Sir David Attenborough – filmmaker, British naturalist |
| 1987 | Dr. Russell Mittermeier, Ph.D. – conservationist, primatologist, Director of WWF's Species Conservation Program |
| 1988 | no medals awarded |
| 1989 | Norman Myers, Ph.D. – conservationist; author; consultant in environment and development for Smithsonian Institution, WWF, World Bank, and IUCN |
| 1990 | Dr. Gilbert Melville Grosvenor – president and chairman of the board of National Geographic Society |
| 1991 | Michael Werikhe – rhinoceros conservationist known as "The Rhino Man" |
| 1992 | Noel F. R. Snyder, Ph.D. – research biologist for Endangered Wildlife Research Program (USFWS), Director of Parrot Programs for Wildlife Preservation Trust International |
| 1993 | Jared Diamond, Ph.D. – Professor of Physiology at UCLA School of Medicine, author of The Third Chimpanzee |
| 1994 | Mark Plotkin, Ph.D. – Vice President of Ethnobotany for Conservation International, author of Tales of a Shaman's Apprentice |
| 1995 | Dr. Kurt Benirschke – Founder of Center for Reproduction of Endangered Species (CRES), President of Zoological Society of San Diego, Professor Emeritus of Pathology at University of California, San Diego, author of Primates: The Road to Self-Sustaining Populations and One Medicine |
| 1996 | Prof. Pan Wenshi – Dean of Environmental Biology and Bio-Ecology Department at Peking University, conservationist, biologist, giant panda researcher; Frank Sturtevant Todd – Executive Director of Eco Cepts International, ornithologist, former Curator of Birds at Los Angeles Zoo, Vice President of Aviculture and Research at SeaWorld San Diego |
| 1997 | David Western, Ph.D. – conservationist, Director of Kenya Wildlife Service |
| 1998 | E.O. Wilson, Ph.D. – Professor Emeritus of Entomology at Harvard University; naturalist; author of The Ants, Biophilia, Biodiversity, Consilience, The Diversity of Life, and other books |
| 1999 | Dr. George Rabb, Ph.D. – Director of Brookfield Zoo, former Chairman of IUCN's Species Survival Commission |
| 2000 | Dr. Marilyn Renfree, Ph.D. – Chair of Zoology Department at University of Melbourne, marsupial specialist; John Aspinall – Founder and Director of Howletts Wild Animal Park and Port Lympne Wild Animal Park |
| 2001 | Dr. Peter H. Raven, Ph.D. – Director of Missouri Botanical Garden |
| 2002 | Dr. Richard H. Goodwin, Ph.D – Professor Emeritus at Connecticut College, Founder and Honorary Trustee of The Nature Conservancy; Dr. Jeremy Mallinson, Ph.D – Professor Emeritus of Durrell Wildlife Conservation Trust; Dr. Ulysses S. Seal, Ph.D – Founder of International Species Information System, Chairman of Captive Breeding Specialist Group |
| 2003 | Dr. Arnold Orville Beckman, Ph.D. – Founder and Chairman Emeritus of Beckman Coulter, philanthropist |
| 2004 | John and Becky Moores – San Diego philanthropists |
| 2005 | Dr. George W. Archibald – co-founder of International Crane Foundation |
| 2006 | Thomas Cade – The Peregrine Fund; Dr. William Burnham – The Peregrine Fund (posthumously); Paxson Offield – philanthropist |
| 2007 | Michael E. Soulé, Ph.D. – Research Professor Emeritus of Environmental Studies at University of California, Santa Cruz, co-founder of Society for Conservation Biology; Rolf Benirschke – San Diego philanthropist |
| 2008 | Lifetime Achievement: Dr. Laurie Marker – Founder and Executive Director of Cheetah Conservation Fund (CCF); Conservation Advocate: Richard Louv – journalist, author of Last Child in the Woods; Conservation in Action: Gladys Kalema-Zikusoka – veterinarian, Founder of Conservation Through Public Health |
| 2009 | Lifetime Achievement: J. Michael Fay – ecologist and conservationist; Conservation in Action: Serge Dedina, Ph.D. – co-founder and Executive Director of Wildcoast; Special Achievement: Ken Goddard – author; Conservation Advocate: Gordon Moore, Ph.D. – co-founder and Chairman Emeritus of Intel, co-founder of Gordon and Betty Moore Foundation, former Director of Conservation International |
| 2010 | Ivan Gayler – Founder and Chairman of Nature and Culture International |
| 2011 | Joan Embery – Trustee of Morris Animal Foundation, co-founder of American Association of Zoo Keepers, goodwill ambassador to Zoological Society of San Diego; Duane Pillsbury – artist, husband to Embery; Young Conservationists: Luca Banks, Mason McGhee, and Nathan Tallman |
| 2012 | Conservation in Action: Edgardo Griffith and Heidi Ross of El Valle Amphibian Conservation Center in Panama |

== Notes ==
I Wegeforth gave the date as September 17, 1916, but other sources give a date of September 27.
