= Anita Figueredo =

Costa Rican-American surgeon and philanthropist

Anita Figueredo

Anita V. Figueredo (August 24, 1916 – February 19, 2010) was an American surgeon and philanthropist, the first woman medical doctor from Costa Rica and the first woman surgeon to practice in San Diego, California. She was posthumously inducted into the San Diego Women's Hall of Fame in 2015.

== Early life and education ==
Figueredo was born in Costa Rica, the daughter of Roberto Figueredo, a well-known Cuban-born soccer player. She was raised by her mother, Sarita Villegas, in Spanish Harlem after they immigrated in 1921. There were no medical schools in Costa Rica, so Figueredo and her mother moved to New York. She enrolled at Manhattanville College of the Sacred Heart at age 15 with a full scholarship, and graduated in 1936. She was one of four women admitted to Long Island Medical College in her year.

Anita Figueredo was one of the first two women surgical residents at Memorial Hospital for Cancer in New York, during World War II when many male medical students were serving in the military. She was the first woman from Costa Rica to earn a medical degree.

== Career ==
While she was a young doctor on staff at Memorial in New York, Figueredo was one of the Pan-American women delegates to formulate a declaration of human rights for the Paris Treaty process in 1946. Figueredo presented the group's resolutions for approval, which was unanimous.

Figueredo spent most of her career as a surgical oncologist at Scripps Memorial Hospital in southern California. She was the first woman surgeon in San Diego. She was known for standing on a stool to perform surgery, as she was under five feet in height.

As a philanthropist, Figueredo co-founded Friends of the Poor in 1982, a charity to bring food, clothing and medical care to underserved places, initially in Baja California; the organization later maintained projects on three continents. In the 1950s she began a long and close association with Mother Teresa. She was also a founding board member of the San Diego College for Women, and a backer of the San Diego Women's Bank.

In 1954, Figueredo was honored by Pope Pius XII with a papal medal, the Pro Ecclesia et Pontifice, for her service work. Figueredo was a trustee of the La Jolla Town Council from 1956 to 1968. In 2009 she won Scripps Memorial Hospital's Lifetime Achievement Award. A biography of Figueredo, written by her oldest daughter Sarita Eastman, was published in 2009.

== Personal life ==
Anita Figueredo married fellow doctor William J. Doyle in 1942. They were married 58 years until she was widowed in 1999. They had nine children, six of whom survived her.

Anita Figueredo died on Friday February 19th, in 2010, at age 93, at home in La Jolla, California, after a cerebral hemorrhage. She was posthumously inducted into the San Diego Women's Hall of Fame in 2015.

She passed away February 19th, 2010.
