= Marilyn J. Boxer =

American historian

Marilyn J. Boxer (born 1930) is a historian in the field of women's studies, one of the earliest in that field. She served as chair of the women's studies program at San Diego State University, the first program of its kind in the U.S., and later in various academic and administrative leadership roles there and at San Francisco State University.

She was born in Kansas City, Missouri, and attended Wellesley College on a scholarship but dropped out before graduating. In the 1950s and '60s she led a family life, marrying twice and raising three children. During this time, she read the influential feminist works The Second Sex by Simone de Beauvoir and The Feminine Mystique by Betty Friedan, and resolved to complete her degree. She re-entered at the University of Redlands and earned a bachelor's in history in 1965. She became a high school teacher, but felt that her intellectual needs remained unsatisfied, and in 1970, despite financial insecurity due to a recent divorce, entered the doctoral program in history at the University of California, Riverside. She had retained an interest in feminism and women's history, influenced by Time's 1970 cover story on Kate Millett and a meeting of the National Organization for Women, and resolved that her dissertation topic be related to these interests. She received her Ph.D. in 1975.

As a graduate student, she taught "Women in History" at San Bernardino Valley College, which she later characterized as her first "women's studies" course. She was hired at San Diego State University in 1974 and appointed chair of the women's studies program, which had been founded in 1970. She later described the recently founded program as troubled by internal and external conflict, with an uncertain future. Under her leadership, the program expanded enrollment 40 percent, hired additional faculty, and officially adopted the name "Department of Women's Studies".

In the 1980s, she moved into administrative roles at San Diego State, serving as associate dean of the College of Arts and Letters from 1984 to 1985, and dean from 1985 to 1989. She moved to San Francisco State University in 1989, serving as vice-president for academic affairs from 1989 to 1996 and professor of history until 2003, when she became emeritus. She was a lecturer and scholar at the Institute for Research on Women and Gender at Stanford University, which acquired her papers in 2014. She received the 2004 Helen Hawkins Feminist Activist Award for Betterment of Women's Lives.

== Bibliography ==
Boxer is the author of When Women Ask the Questions: Creating Women's Studies in America (1998), a history of the field of women's studies. Reviewers called it "a major contribution" and "enormously valuable as a history of the first twenty-five years of women's studies."

She is co-editor of:

- The Socialist Women’s Secretary: Clara Zetkin in National and International Contexts (London: Socialist History Society, 2012), ed. with John S. Partington
- Connecting Spheres: European Women in a Globalizing World, 1500 to the Present, second edition, (New York: Oxford University Press, 1987), ed. with Jean H. Quataert
- Socialist Women: European Socialist Feminism in the Nineteenth and Early Twentieth Centuries (New York: Elsevier, 1978), ed. with Jean H. Quataert
