= Madge Bradley =

American judge (1904–2000)

- Born: November 14, 1904; Ukiah, California, U.S.
- Died: March 21, 2000 (aged 95); Scripps Mercy Hospital, San Diego, California, U.S.
- Occupations: Attorney, judge
- Awards: "Women's Museum of California" Hall of Fame (2002)

Madge Bradley (November 14, 1904 – March 21, 2000) was an American attorney and judge. Bradley served as San Diego's first female judge and was the first and only woman to serve on the bench in San Diego during her long career.

== Early life ==
On November 14, 1904, Bradley was born in Ukiah, California. Bradley's parents operated a wine grape farm. She was the second-oldest of four children. When she was six years old, her parents moved to Oceanside, California, where her mother was from. She graduated from Oceanside-Carlsbad Union High School in 1922.

== Education ==
Bradley took law school correspondence courses from La Salle Extension University in Chicago. In 1933, she passed the California Bar Exam but did not work as a lawyer until 1940 due to the Great Depression.

== Career ==
After high school, Bradley worked at the Union Trust Insurance and the Trust Company in San Diego, California.

=== Legal ===
In 1942, Bradley opened her own practice that specialized in adoptions, domestic relations, probate, and guardianship work. Her interest and enthusiasm for this kind of work led her to chair the Community Welfare Council's Adoption Study Committee which served as an important tool for changing California's adoption laws and gave San Diego County the first license to run an adoption agency. She served as director of the San Diego County Bar Association for two years in the late 1940s.

In October 1952, Bradley was appointed by Judge Arthur L. Mundo to sit as a superior court judge temporary for a single trial, placing her as the first woman judge in San Diego, California. In 1953, Bradley was officially appointed to the bench in San Diego County by Governor Goodwin J. Knight, the first woman to serve in this capacity.

Bradley served this position until her retirement in 1971. During this time, she was re-elected for her position on three separate occasions, winning each election easily.

Bradley was given many awards because of her contributions to San Diego. In 1953, the year she was appointed as a judge, she was named San Diego Woman of the Year. She also received several awards from religious groups, service organizations, and the legal community. In 2002, she was inducted into the "Women's Museum of California" Hall of Fame.

== Personal life ==
On March 21, 2000, Bradley died at Scripps Mercy Hospital in San Diego, California. She was 95 years old.

=== Legacy ===
In 1995, the Madge Bradley Building, where domestic and probate cases are heard, was named in her honor. In December 2017, the Madge Bradley Courthouse was permanently closed, when all court operations were transferred to the new Central Courthouse at 1100 Union Street.

== See also ==
- List of first women lawyers and judges in California
