= Gloria Johnson =

Gloria Johnson may refer to:

- Gloria Johnson (activist) (1937–2013), San Diego LGBT activist
- Gloria Johnson (politician) (born 1962), Tennessee politician
- Gloria T. Johnson (1927–2013), American labor unionist
- Gloria Johnson-Powell (1936–2017), child psychologist
