= Charlotte Johnson Baker =

American physician

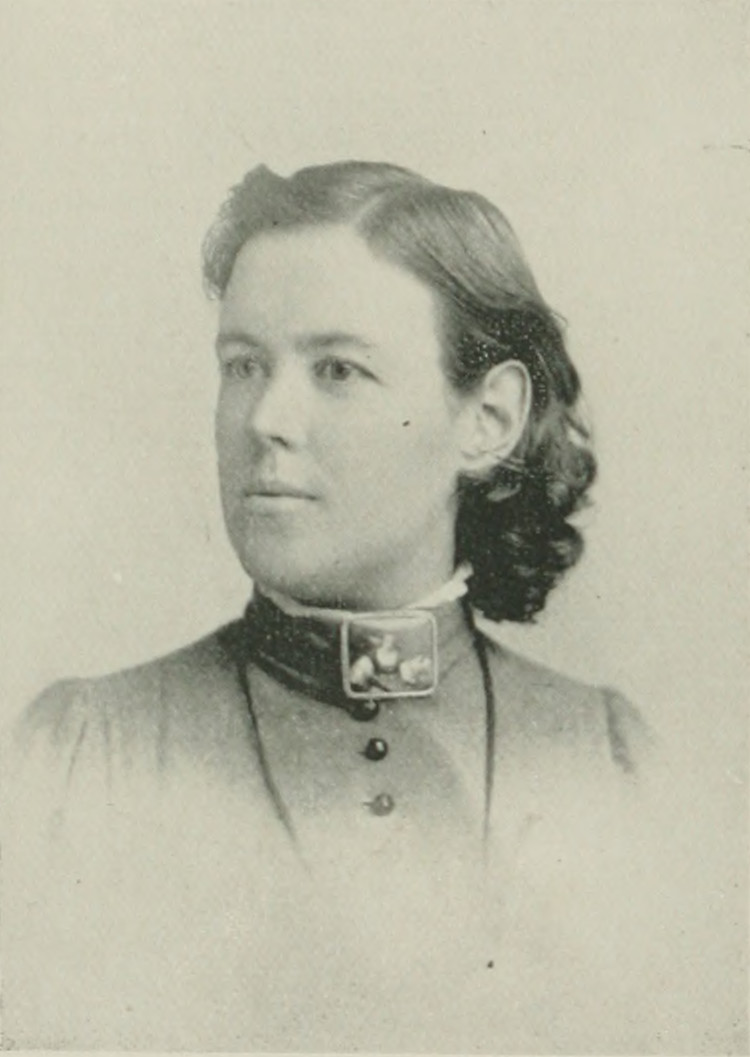
- "A Woman of the Century"
- Born: March 30, 1855; Newburyport, Massachusetts, U.S.
- Died: October 31, 1937 (aged 82); San Diego, California, U.S.
- Education: Vassar College; University of Michigan
- Scientific career
- Workplaces: St. Joseph's Hospital

Charlotte Johnson Baker (March 30, 1855 – October 31, 1937) was an American physician who was the first woman to practice medicine in San Diego, California. She practiced obstetrics and gynecology at St. Joseph's Hospital, where her husband, Fred Baker, MD, was a general practitioner. The Bakers were the first husband-and-wife physicians in San Diego.

== Early life and education ==
Baker was born Charlotte Le Breton Johnson in Newburyport, Massachusetts on March 30, 1855. She graduated from Newburyport High School in 1872, and spent a year teaching before enrolling in Vassar College in 1873. During this time, she was an instructor in gymnastics.

Baker earned a Bachelor of Arts degree from Vassar in 1877. In the fall of 1879, she enrolled in medical school at the University of Michigan. She earned her Doctor of Medicine in 1881.

== Medical Career ==
After earning her doctorate, Baker returned home to Newburyport and married Dr. Frederick "Fred" Baker (January 29, 1854 – May 16, 1938) on March 30, 1882. The same year, the couple moved to Akron, Ohio, where they practiced medicine, before moving to Socorro, New Mexico, where their two children, Mary Caroline, and Robert Henry, were born.

In January 1888, the family moved to San Diego, California, where Baker and her husband became successful physicians, settling in Roseville in the Point Loma area. Also in 1888, Baker earned a Master of Arts from Vassar College for her special work in optics and ophthalmology done after graduation. She was the first woman elected president of the San Diego County Medical Society.

== Political Activism ==
Baker was a noted suffragist and one of two women who spearheaded the San Diego Women's Vote Amendment campaign. She worked to eliminate prostitution and advocated a shorter workweek for laborers. She supported women's suffrage, and identified herself with Woman's Christian Temperance Union, as well as other movements for advancing women individually, socially and politically. Baker also served as president of the San Diego Equal Suffrage Association.

For the San Diego Women's Vote Amendment campaign, Baker and other supporters campaigned at Allen's decorated automobile for a tour of San Diego's back country. They spoke from benches while the people ate their lunches, in Oceanside. They made their way through Escondido, Fallbrook, and Ramona, while presenting their views and distributing literature. The group believed that women would feel valued if they knew their opinions were valued. When the nineteenth amendment came to a vote in the state of California, many thought it was unlikely to pass. When reporters asked Baker for her opinion on the outlook of the amendment, she replied:

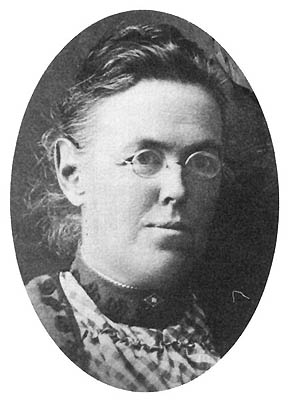
Charlotte Baker

"I haven't lost hope, but I'm not going down to register in the morning. I am very much gratified at the showing made by San Diego both city and county. Indeed the city surpassed my most sanguine expectations. The result here is far better than what it was in the election of fifteen years ago. The returns from the state at large have afforded many surprises. In some cases, I have been agreeably disappointed; in others, quite the reverse. Thus, while I am a little disappointed made by the showing of Los Angeles, I am surprised that San Francisco did not do worse. Again, while I thought that we would carry Santa Barbara, I did not expect that we would get a majority in Fresno. At all events, I am not giving up at this hour by any means. The vote so far announced has been mostly from the larger communities, while our greatest strength seems to lie in the rural regions. The lead against us is not so great but that it may be overcome."

On October 16, almost one week after the election, Baker received a phone call from the City Clerk telling her to go ahead and register. She did so and had herself and three other women sworn in as deputies so they could begin registering others.

=== Positions held ===
- President of the Equal Suffrage Association
- First woman President, San Diego County Medical Society, 1898
- Vice president of the Southern California Medical Society
- President of the San Diego County Women's Christian Temperance Union
- Co-founder of the San Diego Y.W.C.A. and president for three years
- Legislative chairman of League of Social Workers.
- Member of the Anti-Tuberculosis Society, the Children's Home, Associated Charities, and the Joint Commission for Welfare of Working Women and Girls.
- President of Point Loma Assembly (woman's club).

== Recognition ==
Baker was inducted into the San Diego Women's Hall of Fame in 2009, hosted by the Women's Museum of California, Commission on the Status of Women, University of California, San Diego Women's Center, and San Diego State University Women's Studies.

Her diaries and papers are maintained in the document collections of the San Diego History Center.
