= Fred Baker (physician) =

American physician and civic activist (1854–1938)

- Born: Frederick Baker; January 29, 1854; Norwalk, Ohio
- Died: May 16, 1938 (aged 84); San Diego, California
- Education: University of Michigan
- Occupation: Physician
- Known for: Civic activist, co-founder of San Diego Zoo, co-founder of Scripps Institution of Oceanography

Frederick Baker (January 29, 1854 – May 16, 1938) was an American physician and civic activist in San Diego, California. He was the prime mover in founding the Marine Biological Institution, which became the Scripps Institution of Oceanography. He was also a co-founder of the Zoological Society of San Diego and thus of the San Diego Zoo. He was a naturalist and an amateur malacologist.

== Early life and education ==
Baker was born January 29, 1854, in Norwalk, Ohio. He earned a civil engineering degree from Cornell University in 1870, then joined a four-year scientific expedition in Central and South America. Returning to the United States, he earned an M.D. degree from the University of Michigan in 1880. He married Charlotte LeBreton Johnson, a physician and influential suffragist, in 1881. They moved to San Diego in 1888.

== Medical career ==
Baker set up a general practice with an eye, ear, nose, and throat specialty at St. Joseph's Hospital in San Diego, a forerunner of Scripps Mercy Hospital. His wife was an obstetrician-gynecologist at the same hospital. They were the first husband-and-wife physicians in San Diego. Both served as president of the San Diego County Medical Society, Fred in 1891, Charlotte in 1898.

== Civic activism ==
Fred Baker served on the San Diego City Council, including a term as president of the council. He served as a member of the Board of Education of the San Diego City Schools and as its president. He sat on the board of trustees of the State Normal School, which later became San Diego State University.

=== San Diego Zoo ===
In 1916 another physician, Dr. Harry Wegeforth, conceived a plan to develop a zoo in San Diego, using animals left over from the Panama–California Exposition. He invited Fred Baker to become one of the founders. Fred and Charlotte hosted the first meeting of the Zoological Society of San Diego in their home, and Fred Baker was a founding director of the organization, serving as its treasurer. He remained a member of the board of directors until 1922.

=== Scripps Institution of Oceanography ===
Baker was a serious amateur naturalist, particularly interested in the study of conchs. In 1902 he and two colleagues – H. P. Wood, secretary of the Chamber of Commerce, and Fred R. Burnham, another San Diego physician – formed a "biological committee" of the Chamber of Commerce. Their goal was to establish a marine biology laboratory in or near San Diego under the auspices of the University of California. He had earlier met William E. Ritter, a zoology professor at the University of California; now he encouraged Ritter to bring an expedition to study the marine life of San Diego. Baker arranged for the Hotel del Coronado to donate its boathouse as a headquarters and laboratory for the expedition, and collected funds to support the project from San Diego philanthropists including E. W. Scripps, Ellen Browning Scripps, and Elisha Babcock. The expedition in the summer of 1903 was a success, and in September 1903 the Marine Biological Association was incorporated, with Baker as its secretary. The Association's goal was to create a permanent, professionally staffed, scientifically oriented marine biology institute, including an aquarium-museum. After another season in Coronado, the institution moved to La Jolla, where it obtained a permanent campus in 1907. The University of California took over operation of the institution in 1912.

== Scientific legacy ==
Baker was an avid collector of marine specimens, particularly shellfish. He was part of the Stanford Brazil Expedition in 1911, discovering 35 new species of mollusk. Throughout his life he traveled widely to collect both extant and fossil specimens. He published many papers, particularly on the marine fauna and ecology of the North American Pacific Coast and of Brazil. He identified and named several new species including Solaropsis cearana (1914), Segmentina paparyensis (1914), and Neptunea kelseyi (1923). The Scripps Institution of Oceanography named him its Honorary Curator of Mollusks. He donated parts of his extensive shell collection to the San Diego Natural History Museum, to the Scripps Institution of Oceanography, and to the Smithsonian Institutions.

=== Partial bibliography ===
- Baker, F. (1913). The land and fresh-water mollusks of the Stanford Expedition to Brazil. Proceedings of the Academy of Natural Sciences of Philadelphia 65(3) pp. 618–672 + 7 plates.
- Baker, F. (1914) "The land and fresh-water mollusks of the Stanford Expedition to Brazil".
- Baker, F. (1924) "Vogdesella: A New Genus-name for a Peleozoic Crustacean". Proceedings of the California Academy of Sciences 13(11).
- Baker, F. (1928). "Fresh Water Mollusca of Wisconsin". Bulletin of the Wisconsin Geological and Natural History Survey 70.
- Baker, F., Hanna, G.D., and Strong, A.M. (1938) "Columbellidae from Western Mexico". Proceedings of the California Academy of Sciences 23(16).

=== Society memberships ===
- Fellow of the California Academy of Sciences
- Honorary life member of the Pacific Geographical Society, in recognition of his extensive travels around the Pacific Basin and the rest of the world
- Life member ("for services rendered") of the San Diego Society of Natural History
- Charter and life member of the San Diego Museum Association
- Member of the American Malacological Society

== Recognition ==
Baker Elementary School in San Diego is named for him.
