= John Bardis =

American politician

- Education: University of Arizona (B.S in Business)
- Occupation: Assistant Secretary of Administration for the U.S. Department of Health
- Known for: Founder of Medassets

John Bardis is a former Assistant Secretary of Administration (ASA) for the U.S. Department of Health & Human Services. He is also the founder of Medassets, a US healthcare company.

== Education and career ==
Bardis completed his undergraduate studies at the University of Arizona, where he received a Bachelor of Science degree in business.

Bardis worked at American Hospital Supply before becoming vice president of the Baxter Operating Room Division as well as general manager for the Eastern Zone at Baxter International from 1984 to 1987.

Beginning in 1987, Bardis worked at Kinetic Concepts, a U.S.’ specialty bed and medical equipment rental company. At the time of his departure in 1992, Bardis was working as the company’s president.

After Kinetic Concepts, Bardis served as CEO and President of TheraTx, a nursing facilities operator and rehabilitation services provider, from 1992 to 1997. For his efforts, INC. Magazine named Bardis Entrepreneur of the Year in 1995. The same year, Ernst & Young named Bardis Healthcare Entrepreneur of the Year, Southeast National Finalist. TheraTx was also the second-fastest growing public company in the U.S., with revenue growing from $15 million to more than $500 million in five years.

Following his time at TheraTx, Bardis founded MedAssets in 1999. MedAssets became one of the foremost healthcare financial improvement companies in America, with four out of five hospitals and over 100,000 healthcare providers signed up as clients. Until his retirement in 2015, Bardis served in multiple roles, such as chairman, president, and CEO. For his work at MedAssets, Bardis was recognized by Modern Healthcare as one of the “Top 100 Most Influential Leaders in Healthcare” from 2011 to 2014. He was also named Technology Entrepreneur of the Year in the Southeast by Ernst & Young in 2012.

The U.S. Department of Health & Human Services (HHS) appointed Bardis as the HHS' Assistant Secretary for Administration in March 2017.
