= Gracia Molina de Pick =

Gracia Molina Enriquez de Pick
- Born: 21 March 1928; Morelia, Michoacán, Mexico
- Died: 11 August 2019 (aged 91); Tequisquiapan, Querétaro, Mexico
- Education: San Diego State University, University of California, San Diego, University of Southern California
- Occupations: Professor, Activist
- Known for: Founding member of Association of Mexican-American Educators; advocate for bilingual education; Chicana feminist leader
- Spouse: Richard Pick

Gracia Molina Enriquez de Pick (March 21, 1928 – August 11, 2019) was a Mexican-American professor and activist.

== Early life ==
Molina was born on March 21, 1928, in Morelia, Michoacán, Mexico. Her grandfather was Andrés Molina Enríquez, an activist in the Mexican Revolution. Her family was politically active and she often travelled with her aunt to visit the artists Diego Rivera and Frida Kahlo. She helped to found the political party Partido Popular when she was sixteen, which advocated for women's suffrage. She often stood on crates at outdoor markets in Mexico City to encourage others to join the party and advocate for the right to vote. When she was eighteen, Molina traveled to Paris to attend the 1946 founding congress of the International Union of Socialist Youth and then to Yugoslavia to assist with rebuilding railroads.

After moving to Mexico City in the 1950s, she met the American Richard Pick, a Sears executive and real estate investor. She moved with him to San Diego, California, and converted to Judaism before their marriage in 1957.

== Career ==
Molina de Pick graduated from San Diego State University with bachelor and Master of Arts degrees in Spanish language. She studied for her doctorate in education administration at the University of California, San Diego (UC San Diego) and the University of Southern California. She began teaching at a middle school in National City, where many of her Mexican-American students were in special education as English-language learners. She worked with local parents to promote bilingual education. This reform effort culminated in Molina de Pick becoming a founder member of the Association of Mexican-American Educators and president of the San Diego chapter.

In the 1960s, Molina de Pick became a faculty member at Mesa College, where she helped to create the first associate degree in Chicano studies in the country. After joining UC San Diego, she helped to found Third College (now Thurgood Marshall College), which was established with a multi-cultural focus. In 1971, Molina de Pick joined the Democratic Party. She was active in anti-war protests and worked closely with the Mexican American Youth Association. She was a founder of IMPACT, a civil rights organization, and Comision Femenil Mexicana Nacional, a feminist organization. Molina de Pick was the Chicana caucus chair for the National Women's Political Caucus, a vice president of Veteran Feminists of America and a leader with the National Council of La Raza.

In 1975, Molina de Pick was appointed to the California Postsecondary Education Commission. She was a member of the Human Relations Commission for the City of San Diego. With Carmen Lugo, she published the book Mujeres en la Historia/Historias de Mujeres in 2008.

== Death and legacy ==
Molina de Pick died on August 11, 2019, in Tequisquiapan, Querétaro, Mexico, at the age of 91. Mesa College named an art gallery, the Gracia Molina de Pick Glass Gallery, after her. Chicano Park, San Diego State University, San Diego Mesa College, Balboa Park and UC San Diego and the Women's Museum of California held celebrations of her life in 2019.
