= Scripps Health =

Health care system in California, US

- Scripps Health Logo
- Type: Non-profit
- Genre: Health Care
- Founded: 1924
- Founder: Ellen Browning Scripps
- Headquarters: San Diego, California, U.S.
- Revenue: 2,436,344,431 United States dollar (2011)
- Total assets: 2,852,085,000 United States dollar (2011)
- Number of employees: over 13,000
- Website: www.scripps.org

Scripps Health is a nonprofit health care system based in San Diego, California. The system includes five hospital campuses and 30 outpatient centers and clinics, and treats more than 600,000 patients annually through 3,000 affiliated physicians. The system also includes clinical research and medical education programs.

The Scripps name dates to 1924 when philanthropist Ellen Browning Scripps established Scripps Memorial Hospital and the Scripps Metabolic Clinic in La Jolla, California. Scripps Mercy Hospital joined the system in 1995, and was founded in 1890, making it San Diego's oldest hospital. Other facilities are Scripps Green Hospital, Scripps Memorial Hospital Encinitas, Scripps Mercy Hospital Chula Vista, the Scripps Clinic, Scripps Coastal Medical Center, and the Prebys Cardiovascular Institute.

In 2002, Scripps Health switched its hospital buying agent from Novation to MedAssets. Scripps Health had issues with fees that Novation had collected from medical supply companies. Scripps estimated that the agreement with MedAssets would save $20 to $25 million per year of the $212 million the hospital network spent annually on supplies.

The company was ranked 100th by Forbes magazine on its 2024 list of the "100 Best Companies to Work For", citing the company's caring mission and high employee engagement marks.

== History ==
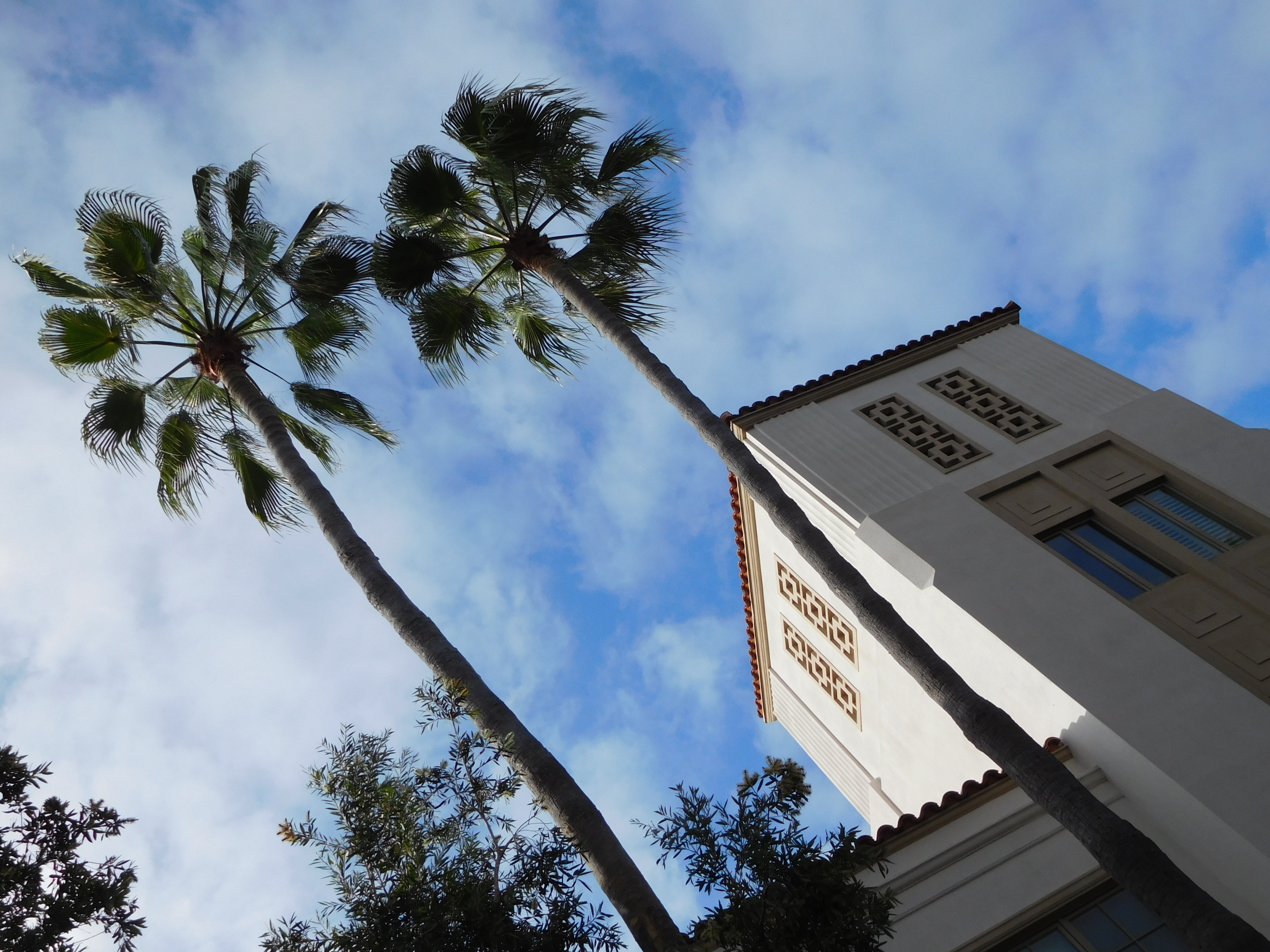
Building of the former Scripps Memorial Hospital at Prospect Street, La Jolla

Scripps Health is one of the many organizations that grew out of Ellen Browning Scripps’ philanthropic efforts. While the organization was formally founded in 1924, the initiative to improve public health in San Diego began in 1917, when Scripps funded the construction of a new sanitarium, La Jolla Sanitarium, since the health center at the time, Kline House, was too small and poorly equipped. After opening in 1918, the La Jolla Sanitarium provided local residents with a reliable health center that helped treat patients during the Spanish flu pandemic later that year.

Seeing the positive impact that the La Jolla Sanitarium had on her community, Scripps later funded a larger, fireproof hospital on Prospect Street that yielded even more space, equipment, and departments. The larger hospital, now known as Scripps Memorial Hospital, opened in 1924 and grew until 1964, when it was relocated to its present site on Genesee Avenue. The La Jolla Sanitarium became the site of the Scripps Metabolic Clinic in 1924, which eventually split to become The Scripps Research Institute and Scripps Clinic.

Mercy Hospital, San Diego’s longest-established hospital and only Catholic health care facility, joined Scripps Health in 1995. Scripps Mercy Hospital now features campuses in San Diego and Chula Vista.

Scripps Health’s facilities and services continue to grow, and now include clinical research, medical education, comprehensive cancer care and genomic medicine programs.

In March 2020, Scripps Health agreed to form a home health joint venture with Cornerstone Healthcare. The joint venture will be managed by a Cornerstone affiliate, which will help launch the partnership and provide home health services to San Diego patients.

== Major programs and centers ==
There are a number of notable specialty programs within Scripps Health, including

- Scripps Center for Organ and Cell Transplantation
- Comprehensive cancer care at Scripps Cancer Center
- Integrative (complementary) medicine at Scripps Center for Integrative Medicine
- Scripps Blood and Marrow Transplant Center
- Scripps Clinic Center for Weight Management
- Scripps Minimally Invasive Robotic Surgery Program
- Scripps Genomic Medicine
- Scripps Clinical Research Services
- Prebys Cardiovascular Institute at Scripps La Jolla
- Scripps Whittier Diabetes Institute
- Scripps Clinic Laser and Cosmetic Dermatology Center
- Mericos Eye Institute
- Scripps Polster Breast Care Center
- Leichtag Family Birth Pavilion at Scripps Encinitas
- Scripps Encinitas Outpatient Rehabilitation Center
- On-Lay spinal fusion center of excellence

== Plans ==
The organization has a number of projects planned and underway, including expansions of the Scripps La Jolla and Encinitas campuses.

== KGTV disclosures ==
Scripps Health is wholly unrelated to San Diego television station and ABC affiliate KGTV (channel 10), which came under the ownership of the separate E. W. Scripps Company near the start of 2012. KGTV regularly discloses it has no relation to Scripps Health on-air, outside regular health news stories the latter organization's physicians are asked to comment on regarding health matters in San Diego.
