= Charles W. Schroeder =

American politician

Charles W. Schroeder (about 1853–1903) served two terms on the Los Angeles, California, Common Council, the legislative branch of the city, in the 1880s. He also was a civil engineer for the Southern Pacific railroad.

Born in Prussia about 1843, Schroeder was married in Los Angeles to Marta Carbajal in April 1881. They had two daughters, Mrs. Hazel C. Blandford and Mrs. Martha Gristock, who operated the Webb Hotel at 642 Crocker Street.

Elected to two one-year terms, Schroeder represented the 1st Ward on the Los Angeles Common Council, the legislative branch of the city, serving from December 9, 1882, to December 8, 1884.

He died October 23, 1903, at the Patton Insane Asylum, where he had been living since he was committed October 13, 1894, on complaint of his wife.

== References and notes ==
Access to the Los Angeles Times links may require the use of a library card.
