= Makeda Cheatom =

American entrepreneur and civil activist

- Born: 1942 (age 83–84); Paducah, Texas, U.S.
- Education: San Diego High School
- Occupations: Activist, entrepreneur

Makeda "Dread" Cheatom (born 1942) is an American entrepreneur and civil activist in San Diego's African-American community. She is the founder of the WorldBeat Cultural Center in Balboa Park, creator of the Children’s EthnoBotany Peace Garden, and co-founder of Casa del Tunel in Tijuana, Mexico.

== Early life ==
Born in Paducah, Texas, Marianne Makeda Cheatom was three when her Air Force father was transferred to the San Diego Naval Air Station. Makeda graduated from San Diego High School (c. 1962). As an experimental cook, she studied food services and culinary arts at San Diego City College, telecommunications at Mesa College, and Transcendental Meditation elsewhere.

== Career ==
As a restaurateur, Makeda founded Prophet International Vegetarian Restaurant (1971–1985), which was the first vegetarian restaurant in San Diego, attracting diners such as George Harrison, Gloria Swanson, Dick Van Dyke, Dyan Cannon, and Dick Gregory.

As a reggae music promoter in 1980, Makeda staged her first reggae concert; previous to that, she had befriended Bob Marley, which led to Makeda organizing Bob Marley Day Festival concerts, thus attracting famous reggae artists; all told, she produced 39 annual reggae festivals.

As an entrepreneur, in 1981 Makeda founded The Baobab, an African crafts/cultural center in Golden Hill area. As a radio show host of Reggae Makossa, Cheatom has been on the air for over 30 years. As the founder of WorldBeat Center in Balboa Park in 1989, Makeda created a music, dance, arts and World Peace center for the African diaspora which includes African-Americans, Afro-Caribbean, and Africans; the venue received LEED Silver Certification in 2012. As a Cultural Ambassador, Makeda acknowledges that San Diego and Balboa Park are ancestral Kumeyaay Indian territory, and she states this at the beginning of programs run at the WorldBeat Center.

As an award-winning garden creator, Makeda created the Children’s EthnoBotany Peace Garden that has been recognized as the first sustainable edible garden in Balboa Park; it was certified as an Earth Friendly Garden by San Diego Master Gardeners, as Pollinator Habitat by Xerces Society, as a Monarch Waystation by Monarch Watch, as a Wildlife Habitat by the National Wildlife Federation, and awarded by the 2015 Del Mar Horticultural Fair. The garden is home to two Multinational Peace Poles, and is co-recipient of a four-year National Science Foundation grant with Cornell Laboratory of Ornithology to incorporate African American and Latino students.

Additionally, Makeda is the co-founder of Casa del Tunel in Tijuana, Mexico, which is an art and cultural center to teach, perform, and present traditional forms of art; philanthropically, its focus is also to help Haitian and African refugees in Tijuana.

== Recognition and awards ==
Makeda received the Channel 10 Leadership Award and awards from Project Concern International, the Palava Tree for Arts & Culture (India), Water for Africa Foundation, and International Rescue Committee. She was inducted into the San Diego County Women’s Hall of Fame in 2012 as a Cultural Bridge Builder and she was named "San Diego Trailblazer" by the African American Heritage Foundation. She has been recognized as one of the 25 most influential women in San Diego’s history by San Diego’s 10 News viewers.

In 2016 Makeda was awarded the KPBS San Diego Local Hero Award. In 2017 she received the Jan Merrit Leadership Award by San Diego Unified School District TRACE Program, and in 2018 Women of the Year Award by CA State 78th Assembly District. In 2019 she received the President’s Award from the NAACP San Diego chapter. Additionally, she was honored on a permanent San Diego City mural, and in the San Diego Union-Tribune, she was highlighted as one of the 2020 Phenomenal Women of San Diego and in a “Name Drop” column in 2021. Makeda was named a "Woman of the District" by State Senator Toni Atkins in March 2023.
