= Carol Rowell Council =

Carol Rowell Council is the co-founder of the women's studies department at San Diego State University, the first women’s studies program in the United States, in 1969. The other co-founder is Dr. Joyce Nower. Today, there are over 600 women's studies programs around the world.

Council holds a bachelor's degree in public administration from San Diego State University (SDSU), and a master's degree in art history, from Rosary College's Villa Schifanoia campus, Florence, Italy. A former Women's History Museum executive director, Council taught the women's studies field experience course, designed to connect feminist activism to the community, while still a student.

In 1972, she co-founded a nonprofit organization, The Center for Women’s Studies and Services (now the Center for Community Solutions), where she served as director for over 20 years. There, she helped establish their domestic violence shelter, feminist free university, rape crisis center, 24-hour hotline, and special women’s programs, including arts festivals, lectures, poetry readings, performances and exhibits. She later worked as development director and consultant to numerous San Diego nonprofit organizations, served as an equal opportunity commissioner for San Diego, and chaired the "Feminist Action Coalition". Today, she continues as a women rights activist, ("Women's March on Washington", feminist forums, and community coalitions), and a public speaker on the founding of the first women’s studies program.

Her memoir is called The Girl At The Fence.

She lives in San Diego with her husband, Trevor Black, and her son, Tim.
