= American Association of Zoo Keepers =

American Association of Zoo Keepers, Inc.
- Founded: 1967
- Type: Nonprofit organization
- Purpose: To encourage animal keepers to become active members of the professional teams at today’s zoos and aquariums, and support the promotion and implementation of zoo keeper education.
- Location: Topeka, Kansas, United States
- Region served: United States
- Website: aazk.org

American Association of Zoo Keepers, Inc. (AAZK) is a professional organization for zookeepers in the United States. It serves its membership through publications and conventions.

== History ==
The American Association of Zoo Keepers was first organized in San Diego in 1967 to promote professionalism in zookeeping by educating zoo staff in the latest techniques of animal care at zoos and aquariums.

Members include institutions and zoo professionals at all levels from directors down to volunteers and students. By 2010, the AAZK had about 2800 members in 48 U.S. states, 5 Canadian provinces, and 24 other countries.

== Purpose ==
AAZK encourages animal keepers to become active members of the professional teams at today’s zoos and aquariums, and supports the promotion and implementation of zoo keeper education. It also promotes public awareness of the need for preservation of our natural resources and animal life.

== Communication and education ==
AAZK publishes the monthly Animal Keepers’ Forum, as well as AAZK National Conference Proceedings, Zoo and Aquarium Professionals, and The Resource for Crisis Management in Zoos and Other Animal Care Facilities.

Other educational opportunities provided by the AAZK to include conferences and chapter activities at local zoos, which let keepers exchange ideas and discuss new methods of care, behavioral observations, and other information.

== Committees ==
AAZK committees are intended to help promote AAZK and the Zoo Keepers’ role in conservation education. Standing committees include committees for conferences, awards, behavioral husbandry, bylaws, conservation, ethics, grants, membership, and professional development.

== Fundraising ==
The AAZK also raises funds for conservations efforts. Its biggest fundraiser is its annual "Bowling for Rhinos," with about 100 participating chapters, which has raised over $3 million since 1990 for rhino conservation. Beneficiaries of the fundraiser include the Lewa Wildlife Conservancy in Kenya and the Ujung Kulon, Bukit Barisan Selatan, and Way Kambas national parks in Indonesia. Funds used to protect rhino habitats are also beneficial to other species including elephants, cheetahs, Grevy’s zebras, Malayan tigers, sun bears, and tapirs, and Javan gibbons.

== See also ==
- List of zoo associations
