= Gloria Johnson (activist) =

American LGBT activist

- Born: August 26, 1937
- Died: September 22, 2013 (aged 76)
- Occupation: Activist
- Known for: Important figure within the LGBT community in San Diego

Gloria Johnson (August 26, 1937 – September 22, 2013) was an important figure within the LGBT community in San Diego, California.

She first moved to San Diego to go attend California Western University in the early 1960s. After living in Los Angeles for three years studying social work and psychology, Johnson moved back to San Diego County. She worked for San Diego County for 30 years, doing social work and specifically working with people afflicted with AIDS.

In the 1960s, Johnson involved herself in civil rights and peace movements. In the early 1970s, Johnson began her political activism in the women's movement especially in regards to the Equal Rights Amendment. In 1972, she worked for Congresswoman Shirley Chisholm's campaign as the first African-American to run for president. She has been an active member of the National Organization for Women for over thirty years and works through this organization to fight for the rights of women and the LGBT community.

Johnson was an out lesbian during her time as a political activist and during her career. In 1976, she became the first openly gay/lesbian person to be elected to the San Diego Democratic Central Committee. She also became an active member in the San Diego LGBT community. She co-chaired a committee that fought against Proposition 6—also called the Briggs Initiative—in 1978. Proposition 6 would make it so that gay or lesbian people could not teach in public schools because of their sexual orientation.

Johnson became a part of the San Diego Democratic Club in 1977 and in 1980 she became president of the club. She has also been co-chair of the California Democratic Party LGBT Caucus.

Johnson has been recognized by numerous organizations for her efforts in the LGBT movement. In 1984, she was listed in The Advocate's top 400 US gay leaders. In 2003, Johnson was inducted into the San Diego Women's Hall of Fame. She was also given the honor of person of the year in 2009 from Gay & Lesbian Times.
