= Helen S. Hawkins =

Helen S. Hawkins (April 3, 1930 – August 10, 1989) is best known as a feminist and a producer and host for KPBS.

Hawkins co-founded and was the first president of the San Diego chapter of the National Organization for Women (NOW). Later, she would be awarded the NOW Susan B. Anthony award for her “courage and compassion and work for women’s rights.”

Along this same vein of work, Hawkins served on the Commission for Affirmative Action and Women’s Rights. She also aided in the creation of Dimensions, a women’s networking group.

After raising a family, Hawkins returned to school and received her doctorate in history at the University of California, San Diego in 1975. After graduating, she became the publications director for the Institute on Global Conflict and Cooperation at the University of California, San Diego.

In the late 1970s, Hawkins went to work at KPBS television as Executive Director of humanities programming. She produced and appeared in over 100 programs. Many of these programs focused on women’s rights and issues. Her production “California Rights” earned her an Emmy and a Silver Gavel Award from the American Bar Association.

Hawkins died in 1989 from a rare form of cancer. The Helen Hawkins Memorial Fund was created by the San Diego Independent Scholars Board of Directors after her death. In 2005, Hawkins was inducted into the San Diego County Women’s Hall of Fame.
