= MedAssets =

American healthcare technology company

MedAssets, Inc
- Type: Public
- Industry: Health Care Technology
- Founded: 1999
- Fate: In the year 2016 was acquired by Pamplona Capital Management later merged with Equation now known as nThrive
- Headquarters: Alpharetta, Georgia
- Key people: John Bardis (CEO)
- Products: Revenue Cycle Management; Accountable Care Management; Spend and Clinical Resource Management; Advisory Solutions; Payor Solutions
- Revenue: ▲US$680.4 Million (FY 2013)
- Operating income: ▲US$90.743 Million (FY 2013)
- Net income: ▲US$27.441 Million (FY 2013)
- Total assets: ▼US$1.613 Billion (FY 2013)
- Total equity: ▲US$489.789 Million (FY 2013)
- Number of employees: 3,400
- Website: MedAssets

MedAssets, Inc. was an American healthcare performance improvement company. It provided products and services to 4,400 hospitals and 122,000 non-acute healthcare providers.

The Alpharetta, Georgia based company had 15 offices across the United States. States with a MedAssets location included California, Colorado, Georgia, New Jersey, Texas, and Washington.

In early 2016, MedAssets was split into two companies and was sold out. The company no longer exists in its original form, although some of its products exist under other brand names under various companies including nThrive (now FinThrive).

== History ==
John Bardis founded MedAssets in June, 1999. The company began as a group purchasing organization (GPO) which offered its customers medical supply discounts. By August 2014, MedAssets had become the largest GPO in the United States. The company became publicly traded in 2007. MedAssets expanded its services over time and offerings included cost and clinical resource management, purchasing and revenue cycle solutions, change management consulting, and data-driven analytic software.

== Acquisitions ==
- In 1999, MedAssets acquired the GPO InSource Health Services of Los Angeles, California (see 2001 acquisition note for reference)
- In 2007, MedAssets acquired Xactimed
- In 2008, MedAssets acquired Accuro Healthcare Solutions
- In 2010, MedAssets acquired rival Broadlane
- In 2014, MedAssets acquired Sg2
