= Scripps Mercy Hospital =

- Scripps Health

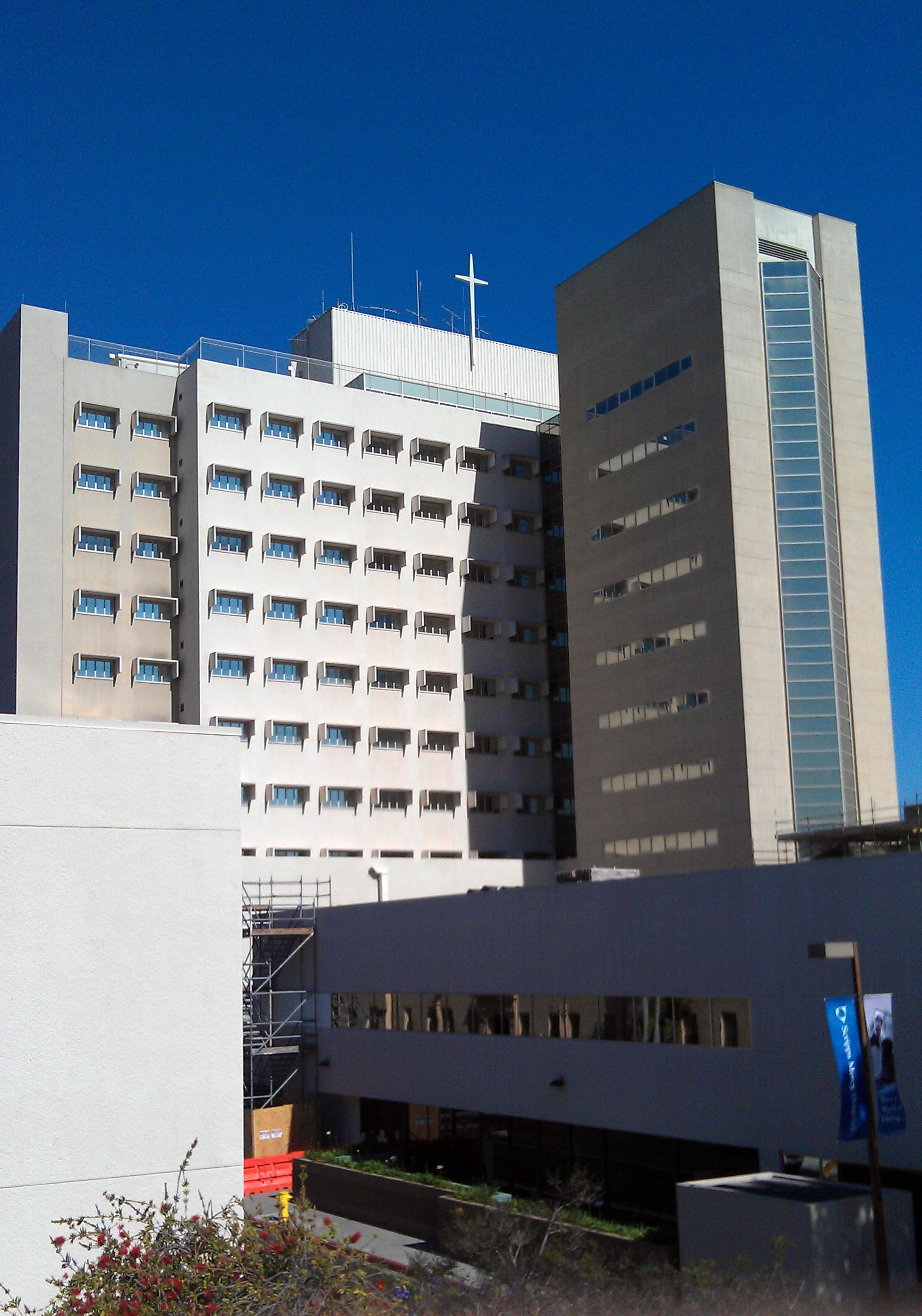

Geography
- Location: San Diego, California, United States
- Coordinates: 32.751387°N 117.159963°W

Organization
- Care system: Private
- Type: Teaching
- Affiliated university: UC San Diego

Services
- Emergency department: Level I trauma center
- Beds: 700

History
- Opened: 1890

Links
- Website: http://www.scripps.org/mercy
- Lists: Hospitals in California

Scripps Mercy Hospital is a private Catholic hospital in San Diego, California. Founded in 1890, it is the oldest hospital in San Diego County and has campuses in Chula Vista and Hillcrest. The hospital has 700 acute-care-licensed beds and employs 1,300 physicians. The Hillcrest campus is home to one of four regional Level I Trauma Centers and receives more than 2,100 trauma patients each year.

== History ==
In 1890, the Sisters of Mercy opened a five-bed dispensary called St. Joseph's in downtown San Diego, with the permission of Bishop Francisco Mora y Borrell. The dispensary was replaced by a three-story hospital in Hillcrest called St. Joseph's Sanitarium in 1891, which was renamed to St. Joseph's Hospital in 1904. It remained the sole hospital for San Diego, until County Hospital was built at the top of Sixth Street, above Mission Valley, in 1903. In 1921, as St. Joseph's Sanitarium, the hospital became the first hospital accredited by the American College of Surgeons that is west of the Mississippi River.

The current hospital building, also in Hillcrest, was built in 1925 and named Mercy Hospital. A second hospital, Bay General Hospital, was established in Chula Vista. In 1986, Bay General joined the Scripps Health system, as did Mercy Hospital in 1995 (which then became Scripps Mercy Hospital). Prior to its being under Scripps Health, it was part of Catholic Health Care West. Even after it joining Scripps Health, it remains a Catholic hospital. In 2004, the two hospitals were combined at the Hillcrest campus. As recently as 2015, Nuns of Sisters of Mercy continue to work at the hospital, but fulfilling more spiritual needs rather than direct care.

== Gallery ==
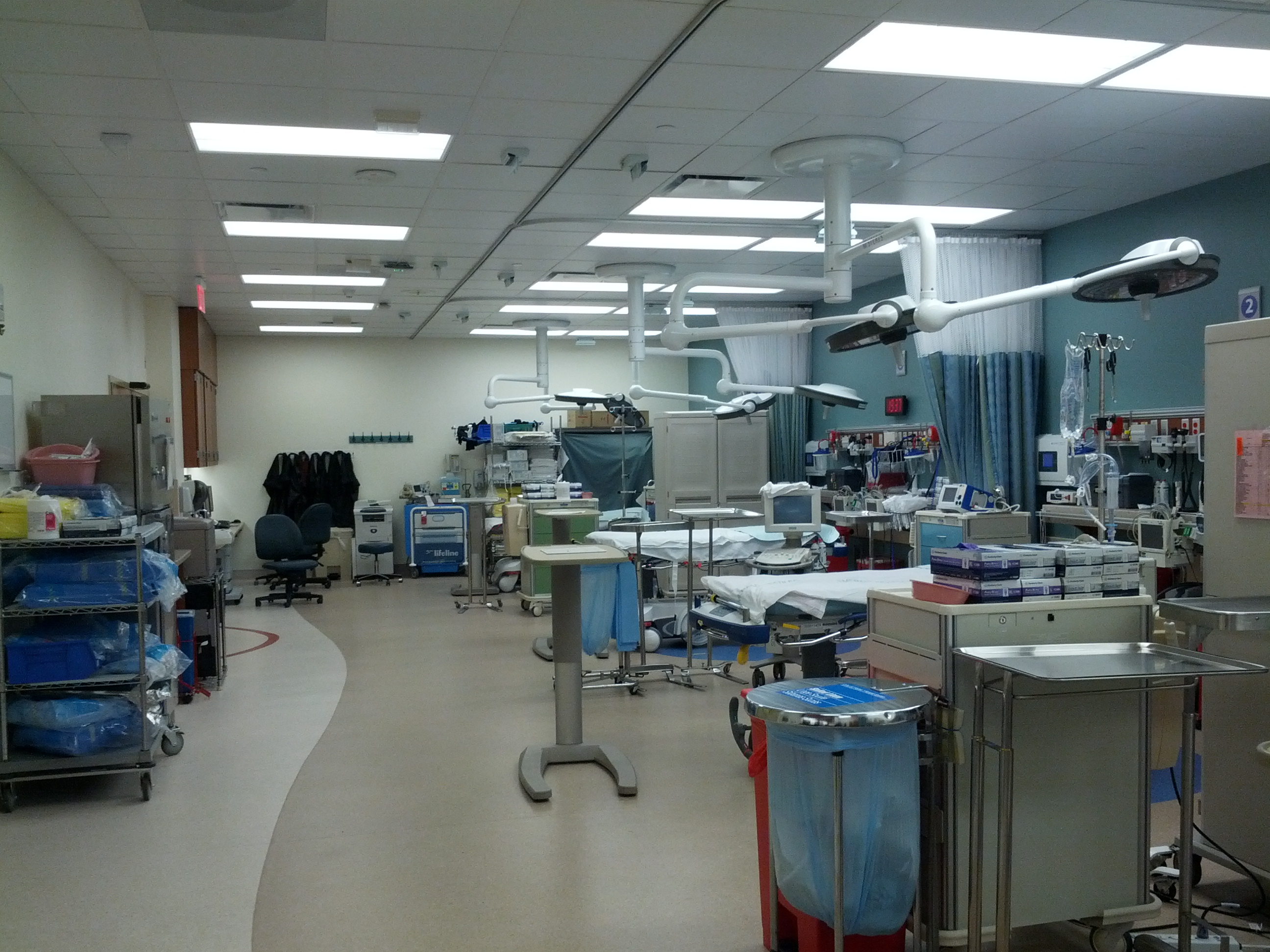
The trauma room at Scripps Mercy.

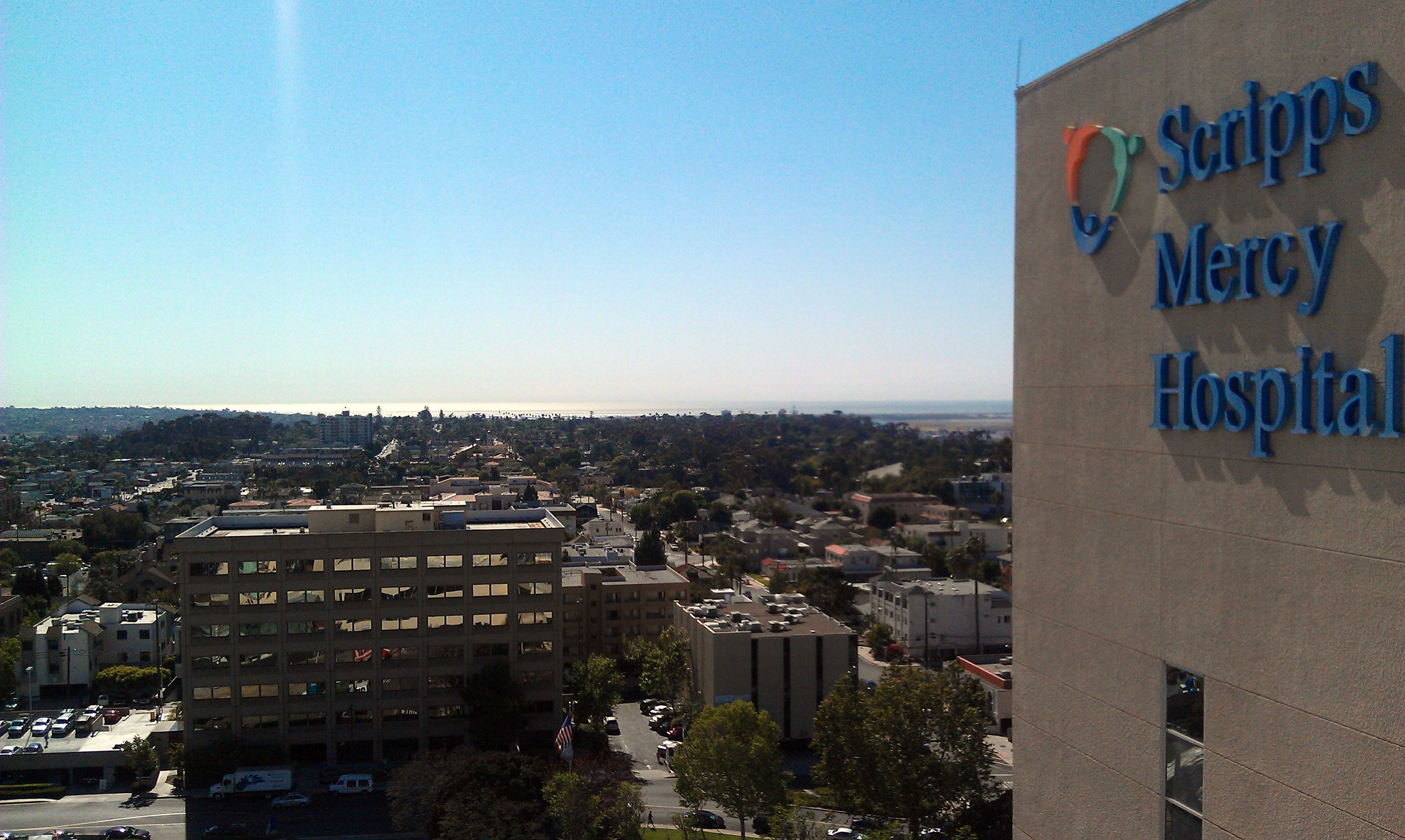
View from the roof.

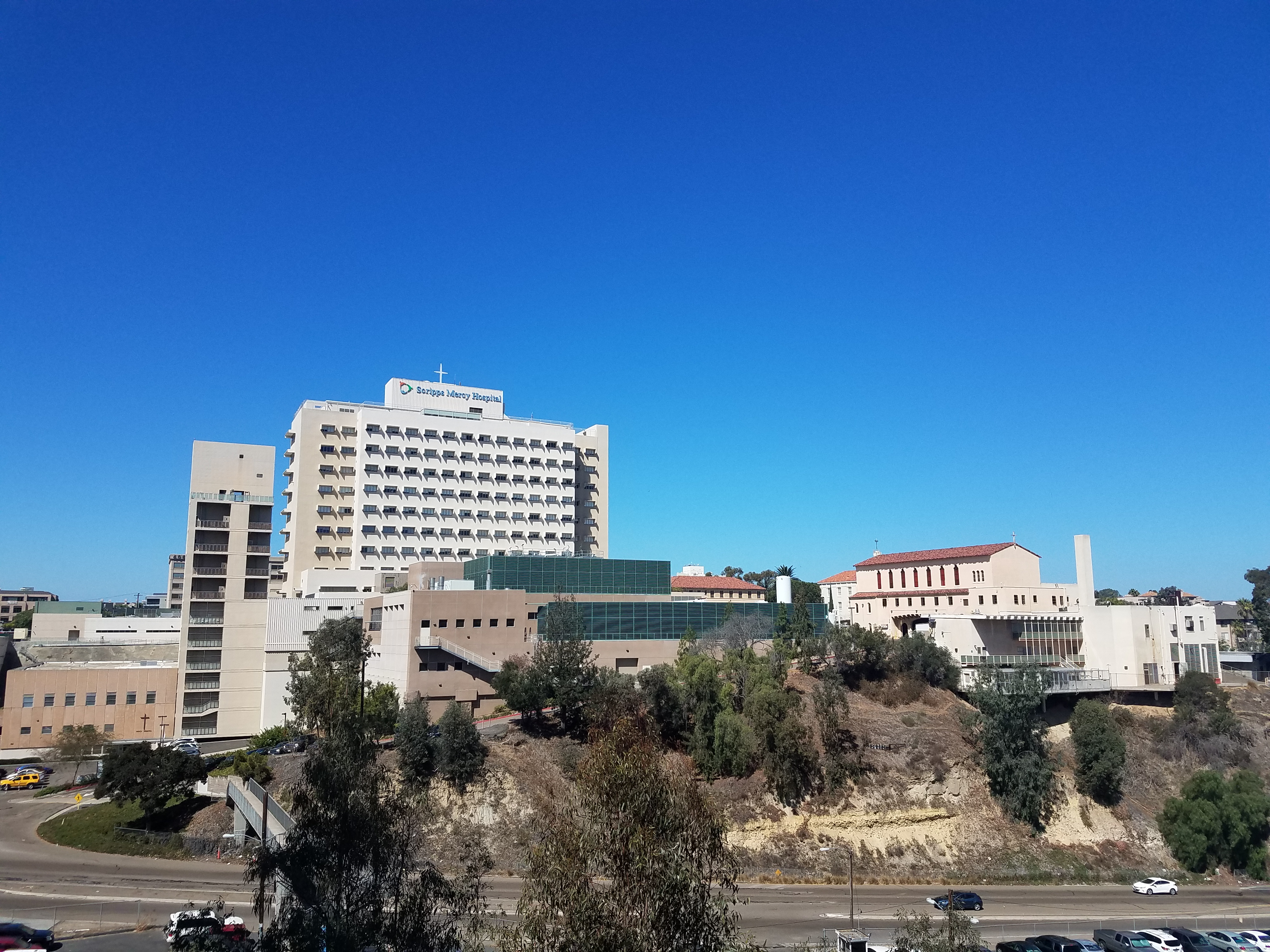
As seen from 8th Avenue.

== See also ==
- Catholic Church and health care
