= Belle Benchley =

American zoo director (1882–1973)

Belle Jennings Benchley
- Born: Belle Jennings; August 28, 1882; Larned, Kansas, US
- Died: December 17, 1973 (aged 91); San Diego, California, US
- Known for: Director of the San Diego Zoo for more than 20 years; directed its growth into a major world zoo; only female zoo director in the world at the time
- Spouse: William L. Benchley (1881–1966)

Belle Jennings Benchley (August 28, 1882 – December 17, 1973), known as “The Zoo Lady,” was the director of the San Diego Zoo from 1927 to 1953, guiding its expansion from a small collection of animals to an innovative, world-class zoo.

== Personal ==
Belle Jennings was born in Larned, Kansas, in 1882 and moved to San Diego with her family at the age of 5. They settled in the Roseville area of Point Loma, where the local elementary school was located in her parents’ home. She later attended Russ High School (now San Diego High School) and San Diego Normal School (now San Diego State University).

She married William L. Benchley in 1906; they had one child, a son, Edward. They divorced in 1922.

== San Diego Zoo ==
After a stint as a school teacher, she was hired in October 1925 by Dr. Harry M. Wegeforth, the president of the Zoological Society of San Diego, to serve as bookkeeper for the San Diego Zoological Garden. In October 1927 she was promoted to the top position in the zoo, that of executive secretary, in which position she served until her retirement in December 1953. Her title was not changed to managing director until the year she retired. For most of her career she was the only woman zoo director in the world.

She and Dr. Wegeforth, as a team, oversaw the growth of the zoo through extensive animal collecting and innovative design. The Zoo was one of the first to put animals into naturalistic “cageless” exhibits. During her term as director, annual attendance increased more than fourfold, and the budget increased more than sevenfold. She ran the Zoo during two trying eras, the Great Depression and World War II while writing and editing the Zoo's monthly ZooNooz magazine and making hundreds of presentations to groups all over Southern California.

She served on committees of the American Zoological Association and was its first woman president; she was a member of the International Union of Directors of Zoological Gardens. She wrote several books, including My Life in a Man Made Jungle, the memoir My Animal Babies, and the children’s book Shirley Visits the Zoo.

In October 1938, Benchley and the San Diego Zoo (then, the Zoological Society of San Diego) made ongoing national news when Benchley arranged to have two three-year old giraffes, later named Patches and Lofty, transported from British East Africa via freighter, where during their 54 days at sea they were caught in the Hurricane of 1938. The so-called "Hurricane giraffes" were then kept for 16 days at the U.S. Animal Quarantine Station in Athenia, New Jersey and driven cross-country over 14 days via the nascent Lee Highway on a specially customized 1938 International D-40 truck — to the zoo in San Diego. Benchley, the zoo, the quarantine station, the giraffes, and the highway featured prominently in the 2019 novel, West With Giraffes, by Lynda Rutledge.

== Recognition ==
Upon her retirement in 1953, the mayor of San Diego proclaimed “Belle Benchley Day” and a retirement dinner was attended by more than 800 people.

In 2007 she was inducted into the San Diego County Women's Hall of Fame.

She was featured by the San Diego Union Tribune in their special 2021 section "Phenomenal Women: Executives and Entrepreneurs".

Benchley died at the age of 91 in November 1973. She is buried in Greenwood Memorial Park in San Diego, where her gravestone features a carving of a smiling gorilla drawn by her granddaughter, Laurel.

== Bibliography ==
- Benchley, Belle J., My Life in a Man-Made Jungle, Little Brown & Co., Boston, 1940
- Benchley, Belle J., My Friends, the Apes, Little Brown & Co., Boston, 1942
- Benchley, Belle J., My Animal Babies, Little Brown & Co., Boston, 1945
- Benchley, Belle J., Shirley Visits the Zoo, Little Brown & Co., Boston, 1947
- Poynter, Margaret, The Zoo Lady: Belle Benchley and the San Diego Zoo, Dillon Press, Minneapolis, 1980.
