= Lee Highway =

Transcontinental United States Auto trail

Route information
- Length: 3,700 mi (6,000 km)
- Existed: 1923–present

Major junctions
- East end: The Ellipse in Washington, D.C.
- West end: San Diego

Location
- Country: United States
- States: District of Columbia, Virginia, Tennessee, Alabama, Mississippi, Arkansas, Oklahoma, Texas, New Mexico, Arizona, California

Highway system
- Auto trails

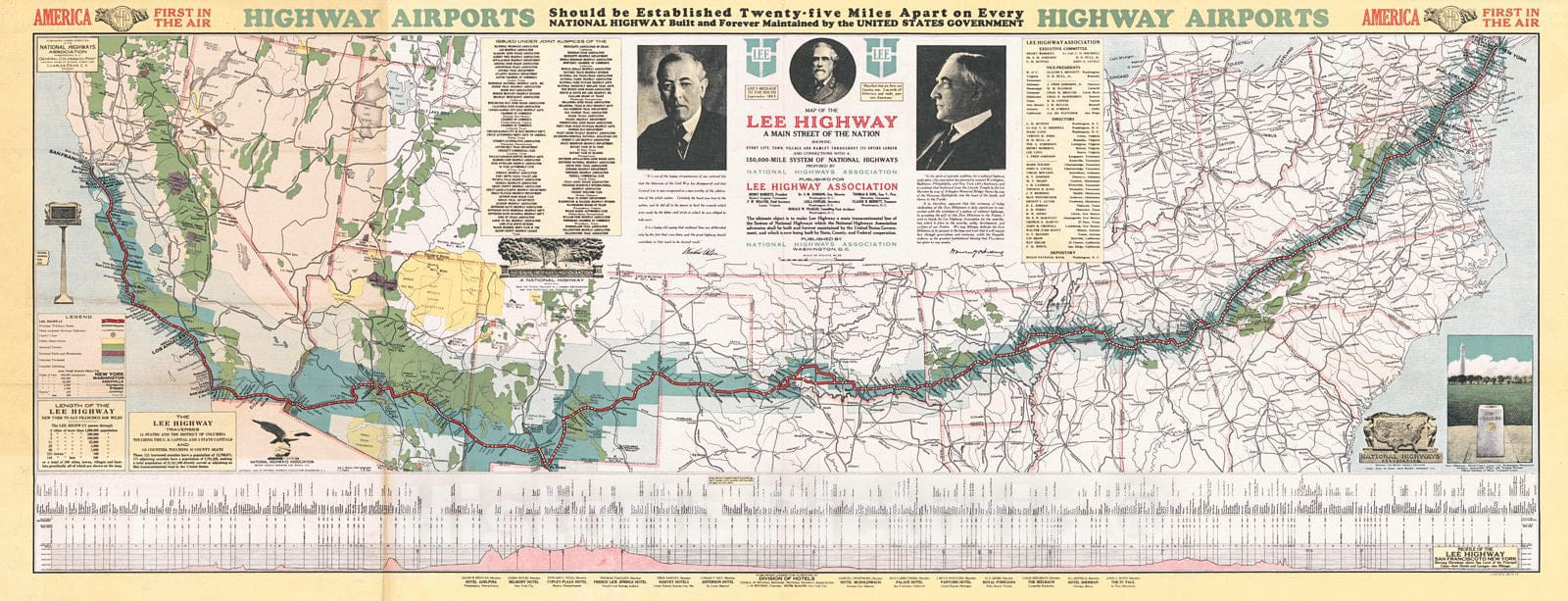
1923 map of the Lee Highway

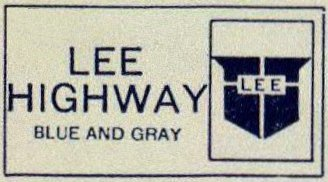
Lee Highway logo from 1925 Rand McNally Auto Trails Map.

The Lee Highway was a United States auto trail through the American South and Southwest. When opened in 1923, it connected Washington, D.C., and San Diego, California; extensions were later added to New York and San Francisco.

The route was created to be a Southern complement to the Lincoln Highway, the nation's first transcontinental auto route. It was named for Confederate general Robert E. Lee as part of a broad effort to present Confederate actions during the American Civil War as just, heroic, and not centered on slavery.

The route was laid out by the Lee Highway Association, a private group founded in 1919 to create the route and encourage the improvement of roadways between Washington and San Diego. The later extensions used existing developed highways.

By 1926, the American Association of State Highway Officials (AASHO) adopted the U.S. numbered highway system to replace named trails. Parts of Lee Highway were designated with route numbers—east to west, U.S. 211, U.S. 11, U.S. 72, U.S. 70, U.S. 366, and U.S. 80—while other parts retained vestiges of its earlier name and history.

The highway's name is remembered in the titles of several bluegrass fiddle songs.

== History ==
In 1919, Dr. Samuel Myrtle Johnson of Roswell, New Mexico, wrote to David Carlisle Humphreys of Lexington, Virginia, proposing a transcontinental auto trail that would connect Southern states as the 1913 Lincoln Highway had done in the north. Johnson proposed to name this new road for Robert E. Lee, the former leader of the vanquished Confederate Army. At the time, Lee was venerated by many Americans, especially in the American South, under the pseudohistorical and historical negationist myth that the cause of the Confederate States during the American Civil War was just, heroic, and not centered on slavery.

Humphreys duly put out a call for a meeting in Roanoke, Virginia, to form a new national highway association. In February 1919, fourteen men, including Humphreys, Johnson, and future governor E. Lee Trinkle, held a luncheon at the Hotel Roanoke to form the provisional Lee Highway Association. On December 3, 1919, five hundred men from five states met in Roanoke to officially form the Lee Highway Association.

In January 1922, Johnson wrote in The New York Times, "Although only twenty months old, the work of the Lee Highway Association has already progressed so steadily that completion of the transcontinental route is anticipated within three years." In November 1923, a commemorative milestone was dedicated at a ceremony at Horton Plaza Park in downtown San Diego to mark the arrival of the highway at the Pacific coast. With much fanfare, President Calvin Coolidge pushed a button in the White House that rang a gong in Horton Plaza.

From the memoirs of Katherine Johnson Balcomb (April 3, 1894 – February 2, 1980), published in The Balcomb Family Tree Book:

Promoting a coast-to-coast highway across the southern tier of states as a memorial to General Robert E. Lee was considered by my father [Samuel Myrtle Johnson] as his crowning achievement. As the number and speed of automobiles increased, there arose a demand for good roads to run them on. Cities along logical routes for highways banded together to promote construction of roads to come through their towns. The first transcontinental highway that was thus promoted was conceived as a memorial to Abraham Lincoln and ran through the northern states. Father's concept was a companion highway that would start at Washington, run south and then west to the Pacific coast. He organized The Lee Highway Association and set about selling the idea to the cities along its logical routing. The idea, of course, had a great appeal in the South and he was able to induce prominent men to serve in the Association. The first president was Claudius Houston, Tennessee, undersecretary to Herbert Hoover. Cordell Hull, later to become Secretary of State, served on the board and later as president of the Association. Father had the title of Director General and received a good salary and liberal expense money.

The national project echoed efforts in cities and towns across the South to venerate Lee and other Confederate leaders during the period of reconciliation in the decades following the American Civil War. In his 1922 piece in the Times, Johnson wrote that the association "proposes to infuse into the national life, the inspiration to noble things that cannot fail to result from a knowledge of the life, character, and services of Lee", adding that the project would be a "worthy work of patriotism in honoring a great American".

The route was inaugurated on November 17, 1923, from an eastern zero-mile marker on the Ellipse in Washington, D.C., to a western zero marker, the Pacific Milestone, in the center of San Diego.

== Routing ==
The route of the Lee Highway was designated by the following routes:

- US 29: Key Bridge from Washington to Rosslyn, Virginia
- US 29: traversing Arlington County, Virginia, where it carries the name Langston Boulevard. In July 2021, the Arlington County Board voted to change the name from Lee Highway to Langston Boulevard, after John Mercer Langston, the first African American elected to Congress from Virginia. Installation of signs with the new name was reported to be near completion in October 2021.
- US 29: through Falls Church, Virginia, where it carries the names North Washington Street and South Washington Street. The road was built through Tinner Hill, a largely Black neighborhood, and bisected the property of Edwin Henderson, a civil-rights activist who had thwarted the town's housing-segregation ordinance.
- US 29: now bearing the name Route 29 in Fairfax County, Virginia (the county changed its name to route 29 in July 2023), to its intersection with US 50/Arlington Boulevard in Fairfax City.
- US 29/US 50: bearing the name Fairfax Boulevard within Fairfax City, Virginia (formerly Lee Highway).
- US 29: bearing the name Lee Highway from Centreville in Prince William county to Warrenton, Virginia.
- US 211: Warrenton to New Market, Virginia
- US 11: New Market to Bristol, Virginia
- US 11W: Bristol to Knoxville, Tennessee
- US 11: Knoxville to Chattanooga, Tennessee
- US 72: Chattanooga to Corinth, Mississippi
- US 45, Corinth to Selmer, Tennessee
- US 64, Selmer to Memphis, Tennessee
- US 70, Memphis to Alamogordo, New Mexico
- US 54, Alamogordo to El Paso, Texas
- US 180, El Paso to Las Cruces, New Mexico
- US 70, Las Cruces to Globe, Arizona
- US 60, Globe to Phoenix, Arizona
- Arizona SR 85 (former US 80) and Old US 80, Phoenix to Gila Bend, Arizona
- I-8 (former US 80), Gila Bend to San Diego, California
- I-5 (former US 101), San Diego to Los Angeles, California
- US 101, Los Angeles to San Francisco, California

== Present-day name usage ==
Much of the original route is still known by the name "Lee Highway", including in these cities and areas (listed from east to west):

- Virginia
  - The Lee Highway was defined by the General Assembly on March 20, 1922, to run from the District of Columbia at the Francis Scott Key Bridge to Bristol at the border with Tennessee. This was defined as U.S. Route 211 and U.S. Route 11 in 1926; US 211 northeast of Warrenton is now U.S. Route 29. It now uses the following business routes:
    - U.S. Route 29 Business and U.S. Route 211 Business in Warrenton
    - U.S. Route 211 Business in Washington
    - U.S. Route 211 Business in Luray
    - U.S. Route 11 Business in Staunton
    - U.S. Route 11 Business in Lexington
  - The portion of US 11 known as Apperson Drive in Salem, Virginia, and Brandon Avenue SW in Roanoke, Virginia, is also commonly called Lee Highway. Other sections of US 11 in the Roanoke Valley are not typically referred to as Lee Highway. In the county of Botetourt, US 11 changes from Williamson Road to Lee Highway and is thus named at least until Buchanan, Virginia
- Tennessee
  - East Tennessee (US 11 from Chattanooga to Dixie Lee Junction)
  - Cleveland, Tennessee
  - Chattanooga, Tennessee
  - South Pittsburg, Tennessee
- Huntsville, Alabama
- Florence, Alabama
- Corinth, Mississippi

== In popular culture ==
In October 1938, cities along the highway made national news when the San Diego Zoo, under the direction of Belle Benchley, arranged to have two three-year old giraffes, later named Patches and Lofty, transported from British East Africa via freighter. During the giraffes' 54 days at sea, they were caught in the Hurricane of 1938. After a 16-day stay at the U.S. Animal Quarantine Station in Athenia, New Jersey, they were loaded on a customized 1938 International D-40 truck for a 14-day journey on the Lee Highway to the zoo in San Diego. The highway, quarantine station, giraffes, and zoo feature prominently in the 2019 novel West With Giraffes.

The "Lee Highway Blues" is a standard of southern string band music. It is widely attributed to G. B. Grayson of the popular Grayson and Whitter string band of the late 1920s, who recorded it under the title "Going Down The Lee Highway" but it was almost certainly composed by fiddler James ("Uncle Jimmy" or "Fiddlin' Jim") McCarroll of the Roane County Ramblers. The tune has been used as a fiddler's showpiece, especially in the Virginia area and notably by Scotty Stoneman (who referred to it as Talkin' Fiddle Blues) and by string band revivalists such as the Highwoods String Band. Alice Gerrard and Hazel Dickens recorded a rendition of Lee Highway Blues on the Smithsonian Folkways album Pioneering Women of Bluegrass, as did Chubby Wise. David Bromberg wrote a whimsical bluegrass variation, "The New Lee Highway Blues", describing the tribulations of traveling on an endless highway of one-horse towns. The song was the final track on Wanted Dead or Alive, Bromberg's third album, released in 1974. AllMusic described the song as among "Bromberg's strongest and best-loved material".

Fiddler Ken Clark performed a variation called "Lee Highway Ramble", recorded around 1961.
