= U.S. Animal Quarantine Station =

- United States Animal Quarantine Station
- U.S. National Register of Historic Places
- New Jersey Register of Historic Places
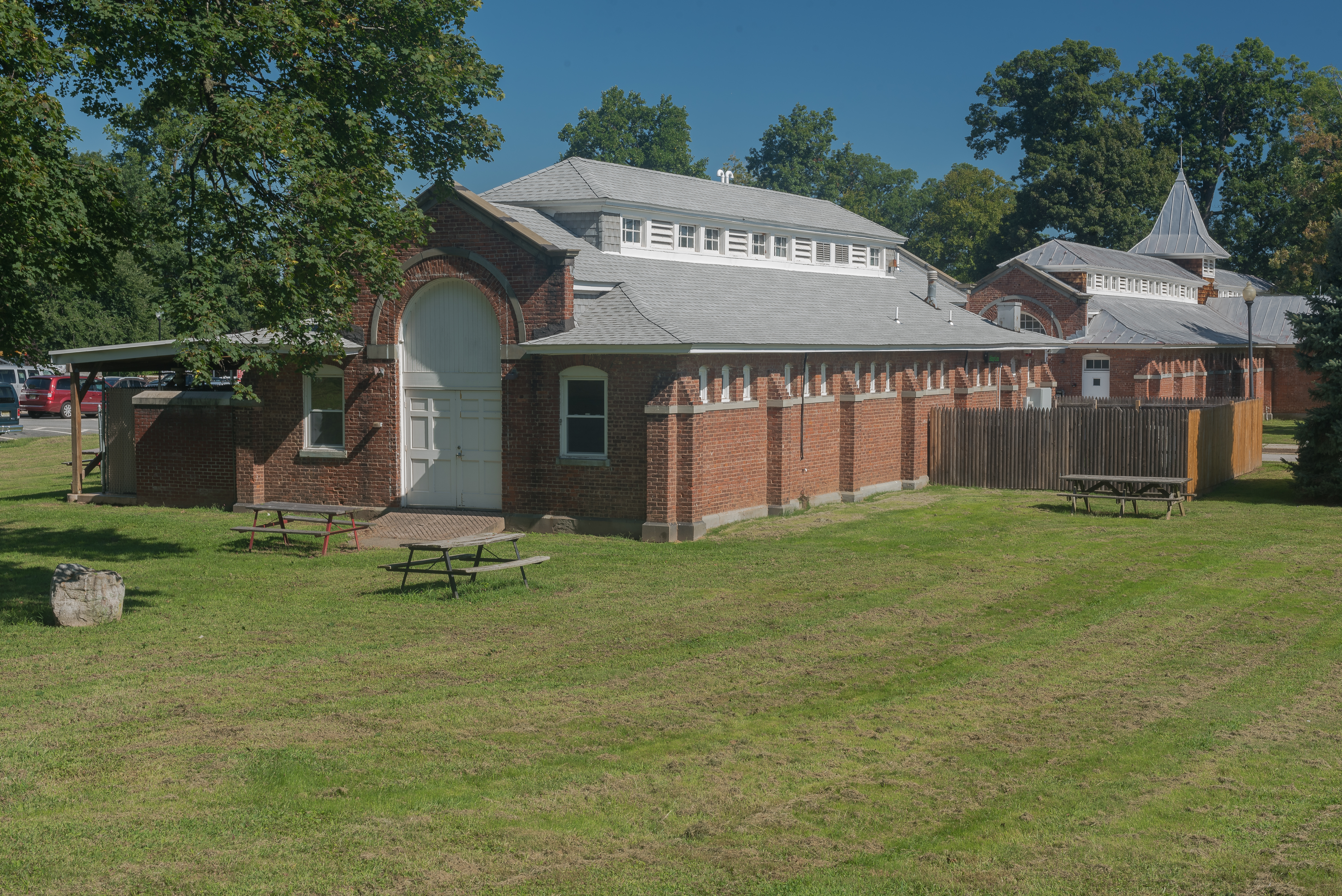
- Former barns, now the Clifton Arts Center

- Location within Passaic County, New Jersey Location within New Jersey Location within the United States
- Location: Clifton Avenue, Clifton, New Jersey
- Coordinates: 40°52′5″N 74°9′43″W
- Area: 26 acres (11 ha)
- Built: 1900–1907
- Architectural style: Colonial Revival
- NRHP reference No.: 81000397
- NJRHP No.: 2331

Significant dates
- Added to NRHP: October 9, 1981
- Designated NJRHP: August 7, 1981

The United States Animal Quarantine Station, sometimes referred to the as Athenia Quarantine Station, is located in the city of Clifton in Passaic County, New Jersey, United States, constructed in 1900, and colloquially called the "Ellis Island for Animals". The complex, closed in 1975, was added to the National Register of Historic Places on October 9, 1981, for its significance to agriculture. Part of the site is now the Clifton Municipal Complex. Two of the buildings were renovated and turned into the Clifton Arts Center Gallery and Studio. An atrium was built to connect the two buildings. It is considered to be threatened site.

== History and description ==
The station originally contained 27 buildings built between 1900 and 1907 on a 49-acre (20 ha) property. It operated from 1900 to 1979 to receive and isolate foreign animals entering the country. There were 14 brick barns at the site. In 1966, the property was sold to the city. In 2000, the Clifton Arts Center, founded by Gloria J. Kolodziej, opened here using two of the brick barns.

In October 1938, it was widely reported nationwide that two three-year old giraffes, later named Patches and Lofty, were kept for 14 days at the Athenia Quarantine Station, after 54 days under transport from British East Africa via freighter, caught in the Hurricane of 1938, before 14 days cross-country via the nascent Lee Highway on a specially customized truck to the San Diego Zoo, at the time the Zoological Society of San Diego, under the direction of Belle Benchley. The quarantine station and the giraffes featured prominently in the 2019 novel West With Giraffes.

== See also ==
- National Register of Historic Places listings in Passaic County, New Jersey
