= List of International trucks =

International trucks have been built and sold by the International Harvester Company (renamed Navistar International in 1986) from 1909 until the present (2026). Originally marketed to farmers the trucks were immediately successful and were sold to businesses in cities as well. Since then International trucks have been sold worldwide and built or assembled in the United States, Australia, Brazil, Canada, England, Germany, Mexico, South Africa, the Soviet Union, and Turkey.

International Harvester also built large numbers of military tactical vehicles between 1941 and 1961. These were not branded "International". Navistar has built military tactical trucks since 2007. These are branded "International". Military trucks are not included here.

In 2019 International markets six separate series of medium-duty, heavy-duty, and severe-service trucks with loaded weights from 16,000 to 92,000 pounds (7,300 to 41,700 kg) and up to 140,000 pounds (64,000 kg) including trailers. International also has always built a wide range of custom and speciality use trucks and chassis.

== 1909–1919 ==
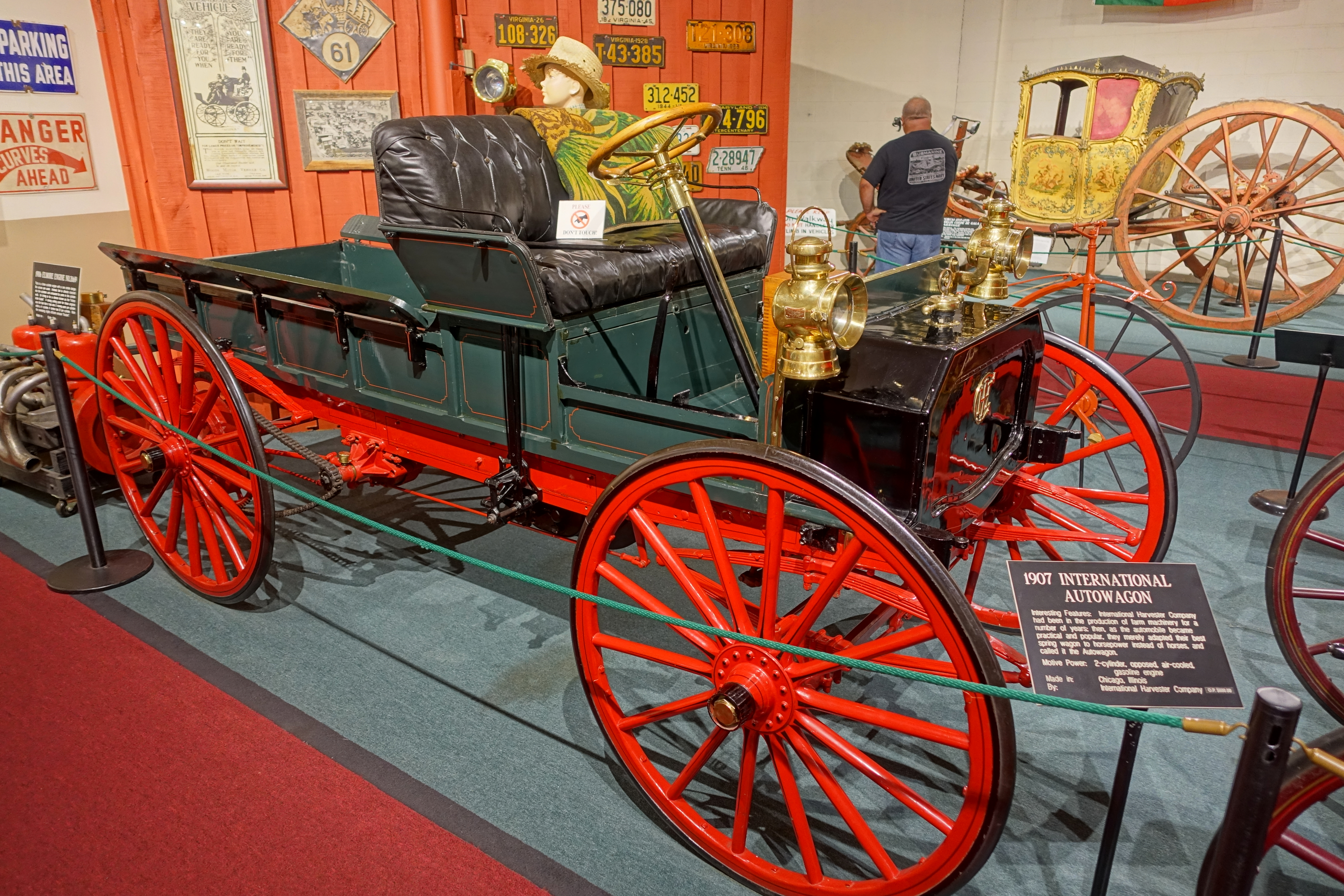
Auto Wagon

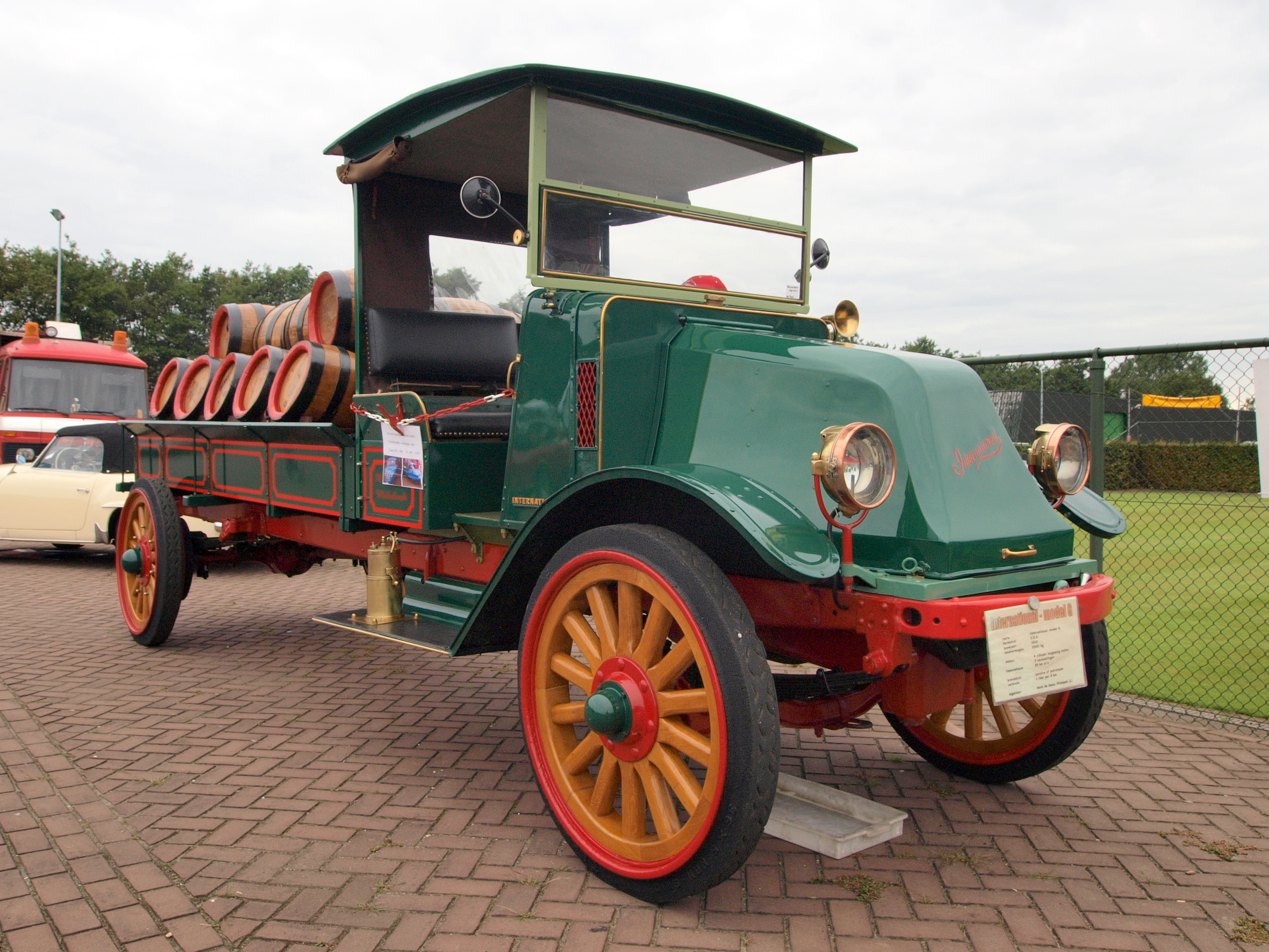
1916 Model G

=== Auto Wagon (1909-1916) ===
Models: Auto Wagon AA, AW, MA, MW, MAX, MWX

The Auto Wagon, a variant of the Auto Buggy of 1907, was the first truck built by International Harvester. It was basically a light wooden wagon with a primitive gasoline engine mounted below the body. They were sometimes called "Highwheelers". Introduced in 1909 it was designed for farmers using poor rural roads but soon became popular in urban areas. The Auto Wagon was built until 1916.

=== F Series (1913) ===
Models: H, F, K, G, L

The Model F was a completely different type of truck than the Auto Wagon, with a steel ladder frame. It had a "Renault-type" tapered hood, often referred to as a coffin-nose or shovelnose. A front-mounted engine drove through a transmission and driveshaft to a geared differential rear axle. The models were given letter designations in chronological order, with the weight ratings being 3/4 short ton (680 kg) for the H, 1 short ton (907 kg) for the F, 1 1/2 short tons (1,361 kg) for the K, 2 short tons (1,814 kg) for the G, 4 short tons (3,629 kg) for the L.

== 1920–1939 ==
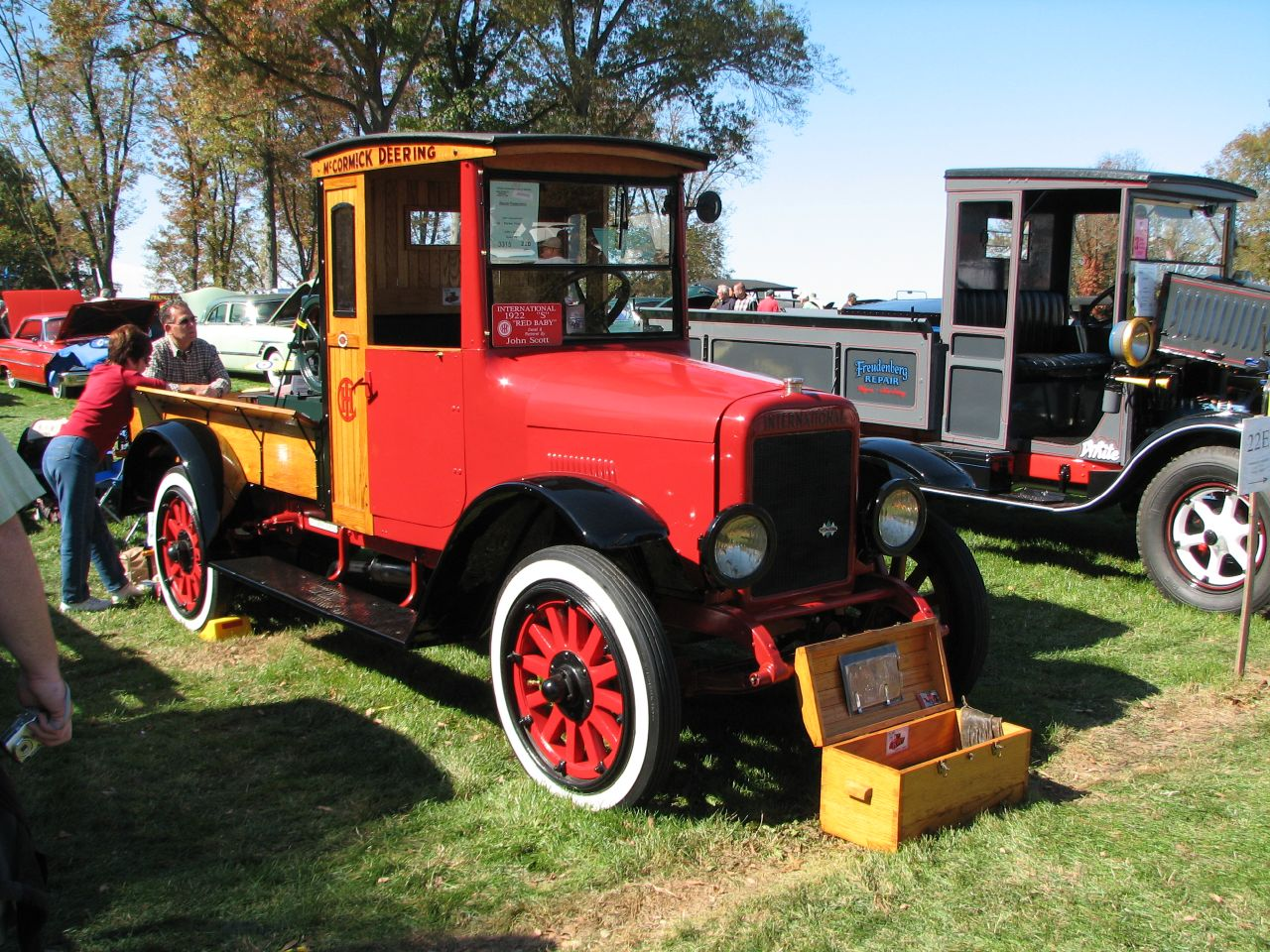
1922 Model S “Red Baby”

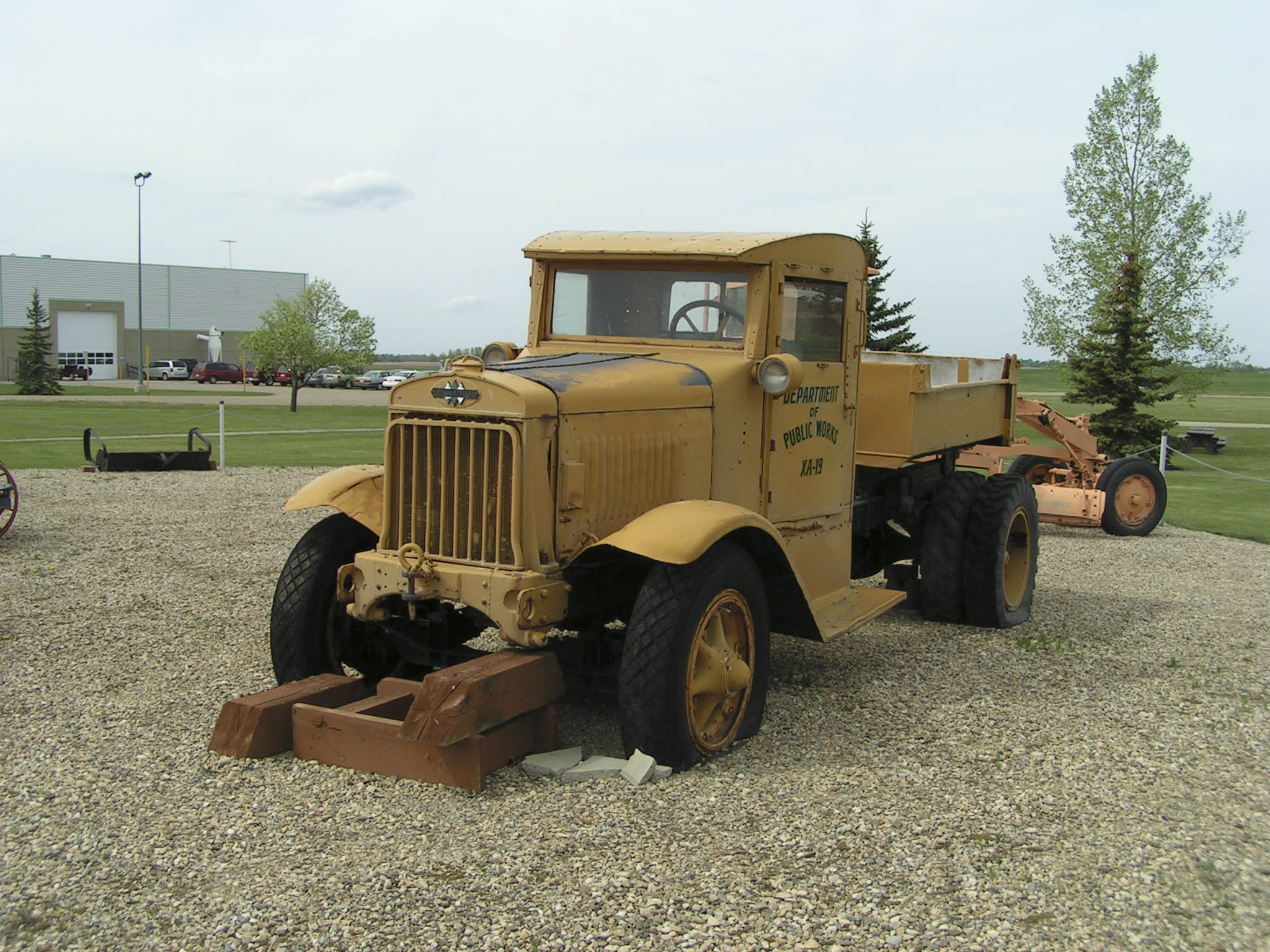
Mid-1920s heavy-duty International truck (Models 33-103)

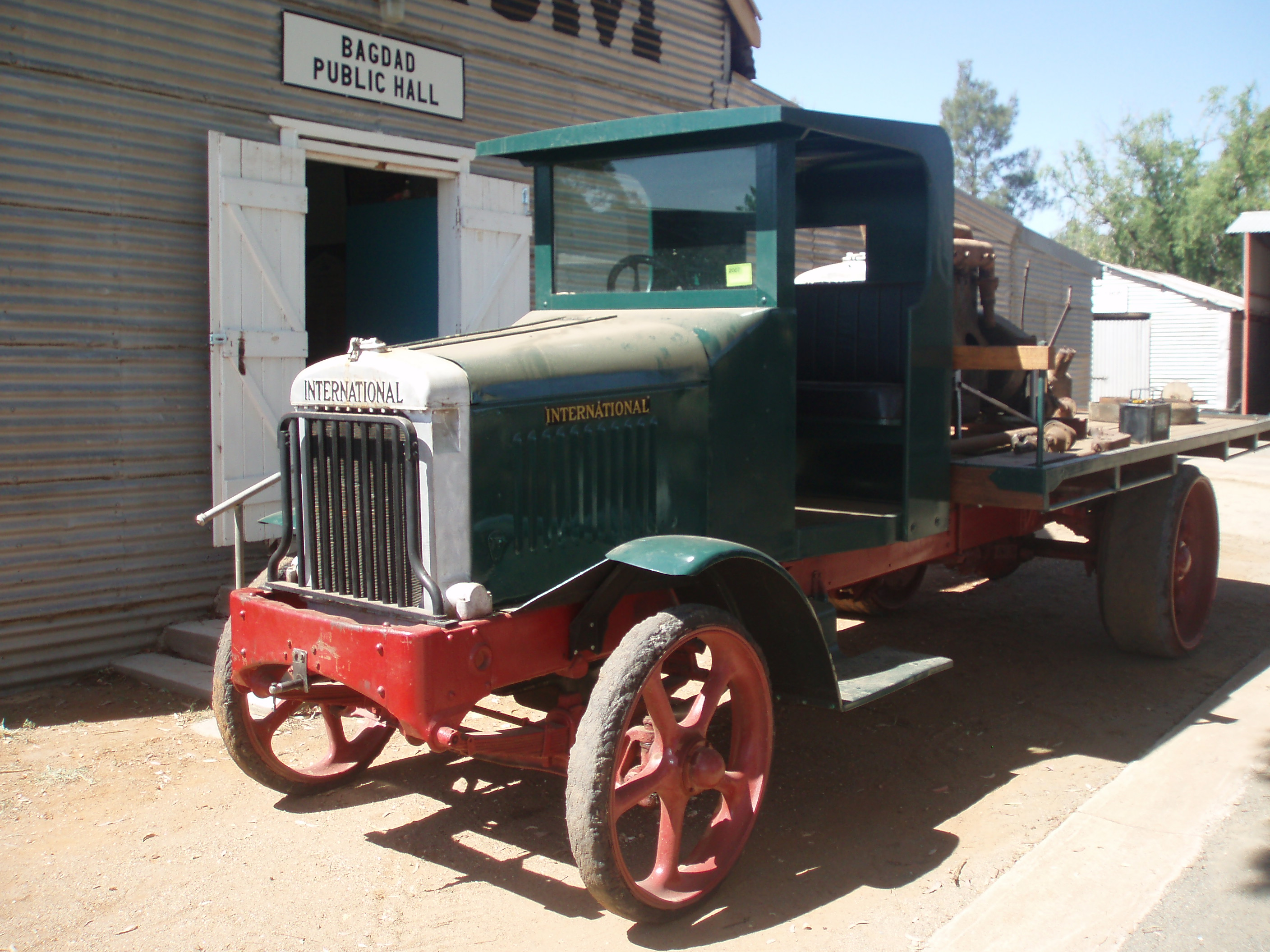
1924 Model 103

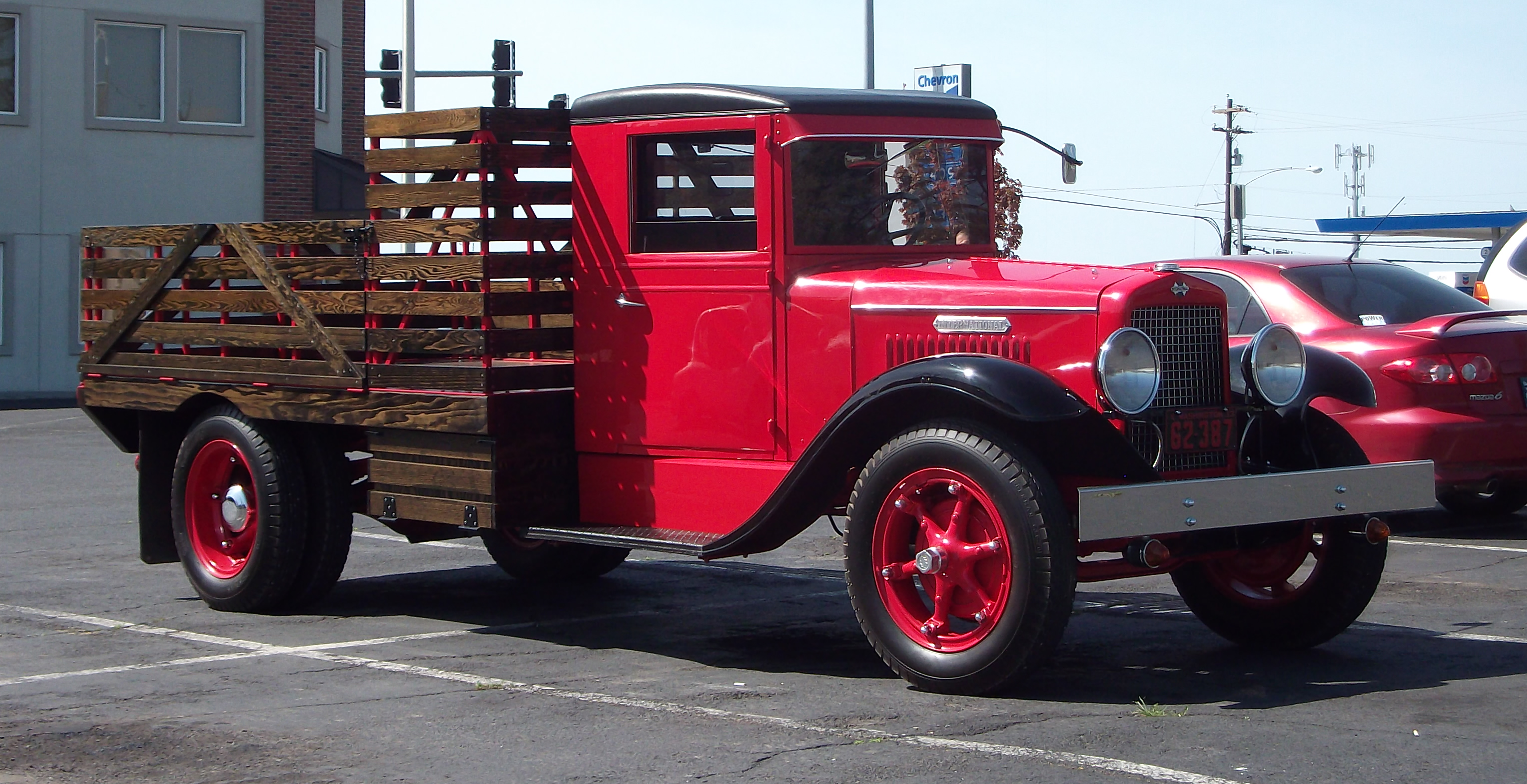
1931 A-2

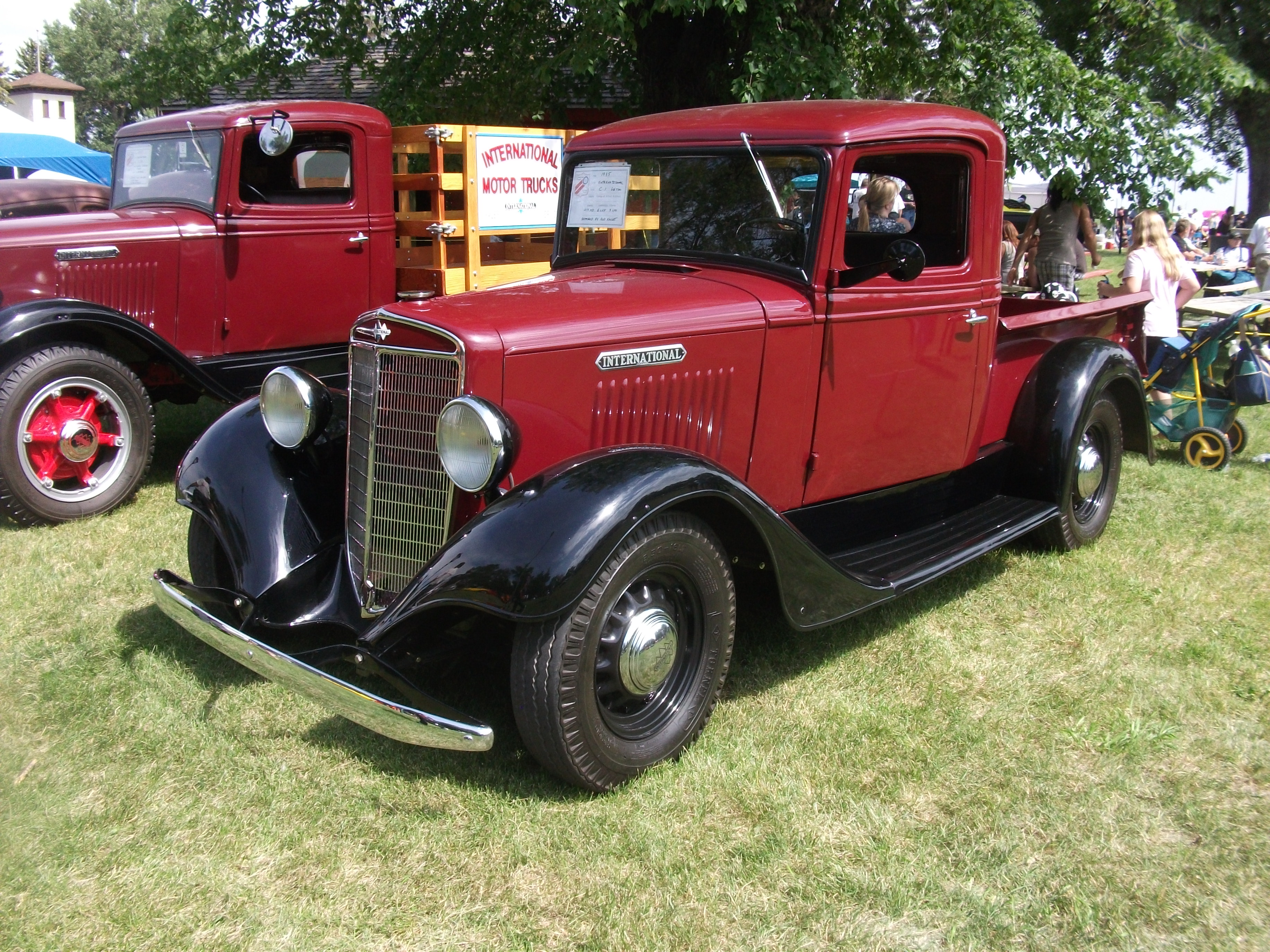
1935 C 1

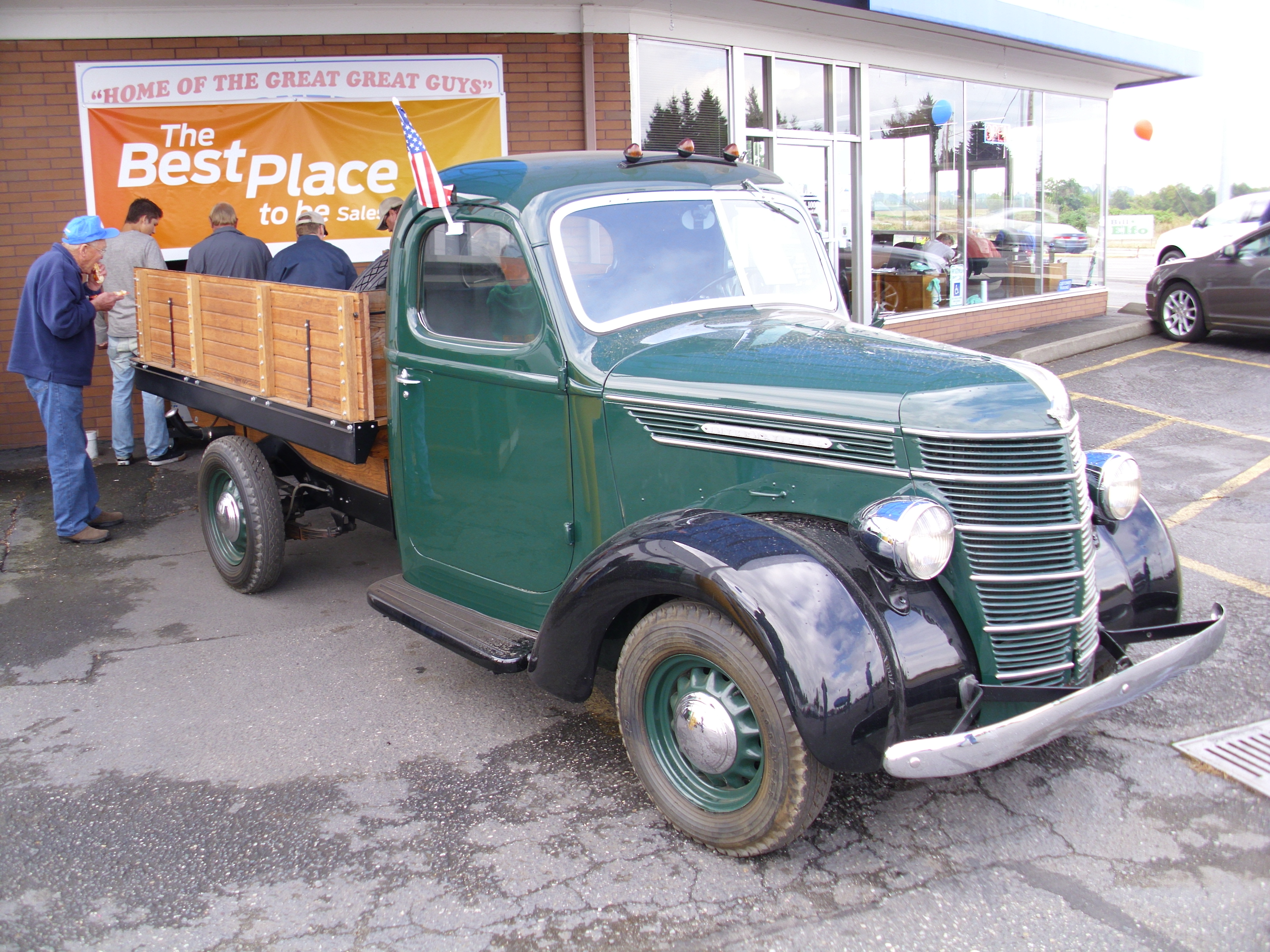
D-15

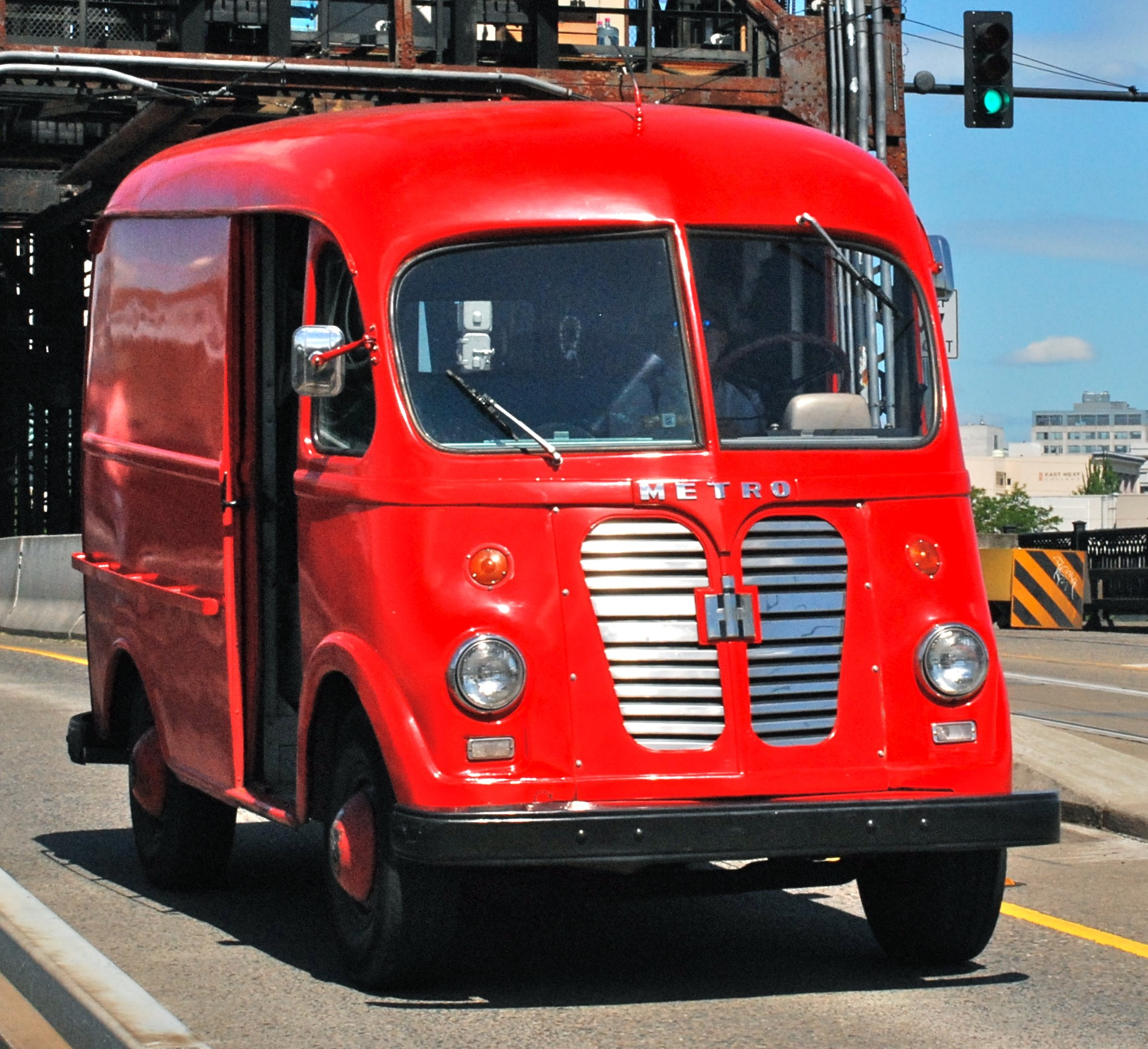
1958 Metro (S chassis)

=== Models 21-101 (1921-1924) ===
Sometime in 1921, the old Model F and its derivatives were renamed. The new versions received slightly higher weight ratings, to make room for the new, lighter Model S below. Now names in order from lightest to heaviest, the range started with the 1-short-ton (907 kg) Model 21 and continued with the 1 1/2-short-ton (1,361 kg) Model 31, 2-short-ton (1,814 kg) Model 41, 3-short-ton (2,722 kg) Model 61, and ended with the 5-short-ton (4,536 kg) Model 101; the Model 101 only entered production during 1922. These remained of a shovelnose design, with the radiator mounted behind the engine, a layout retained until they were replaced by the more conventional Models 33-103 in 1924.

=== Models 33-104, HS series (1924-1932) ===
The Model F-based medium- and heavy-duty Models 21-101 received an update in 1924, with the radiator mounted in the usual location in front of the engine. They were still old-fashioned, retaining the 1916-vintage frame and option of solid rubber wheels rather than pneumatic ones, but the steering assembly was all-new, eliminating the nearly upright steering wheel seen on the earlier versions and the engines were upgraded. The new range consisted of the 1 1/2-short-ton (1,361 kg) Model 33 2-short-ton (1,814 kg) Model 43, 3-short-ton (2,722 kg) Model 63, 4 1/2-short-ton (4,082 kg) Model 94 (introduced in late 1924), and ended with the 5-short-ton (4,536 kg) Model 103.

In late 1926, for the 1927 model year, the chassis was updated with a new rear axle and the range renamed to Models 54, 74, and 104. Introduction was gradual and there was some overlap, and only the heavier-duty models remained, weight ratings being 2 1/2 short tons (2,268 kg), 3 1/2-short-ton (3,175 kg), and 5-short-ton (4,536 kg) respectively. Solid tires, cast iron wheels, and chain drive remained available. During 1928, International's own tractor engines were replaced in the heavy-duty lineup by much more modern and powerful units from Hall-Scott; model numbers accordingly gained an HS- prefix and these were fitted with front drum brakes to handle the higher speeds possible. In 1930, the HS series was gradually replaced by two new lines: from below, the smaller A series took over, fitted with in-house engines, with heavier models being replaced by the W series which was an updated HS. The chain driven HS-74-C and 104-C were not replaced and continued to be built in small numbers until 1932, being favored by some loggers and contractors for its simplicity and strength.

=== W series (1930-193x) ===
Gradually introduced beginning in 1930, the W series was a revised version of the 54, 74, and 104, still using the Hall-Scott engines. More modern in appearance, they have a chrome-plateed grille, a center-hinged hood, and headlights mounted in the conventional locations aside the grille. Chain drive was no longer available. The more modern A series gradually replaced the W series and the lineup shrunk as the W-1 was discontinued in 1933, and the W-3 in 1934. The 3 1/2-short-ton (3,175 kg) W-2 remained available into 1935 as an especially heavy-duty option.

=== C series (1934-1936) ===
The C series was a range of trucks introduced in 1934. They introduced a new all-steel cab. There were also mechanical advances during its production. All types of bodies were used, door-to-door milk delivery models were common. Cab-over-engine models were available. The C-series was replaced by the D Series in 1937.

=== D Series (1937-1939) ===
The D Series was a range of light, medium, and heavy-duty trucks introduced in 1937. They had rounded styling and a new cab with a two-piece V-shaped windshield. Cab-over-engine models were also available. All types of bodies including semi-tractors were available. The D Series was replaced by the K Series in 1940.

=== Metro (1938-1962) ===
Models: D, K/KB, L, R, S, and A 1/2 to 1 1/2-ton (450–1360 kg) chassis with an "M" in model number

The Metro was a range of step vans introduced in 1938. It had a rounded cab-over-engine body with sliding doors on a then-current light or medium chassis. Bodies were built at the Metropolitan Body Co. and cab-chassis were offered for vendor bodies. In 1963 the original-style bodies were replaced with flat-panel models. In 1972 Metropolitan Body closed.

== 1940–1959 ==
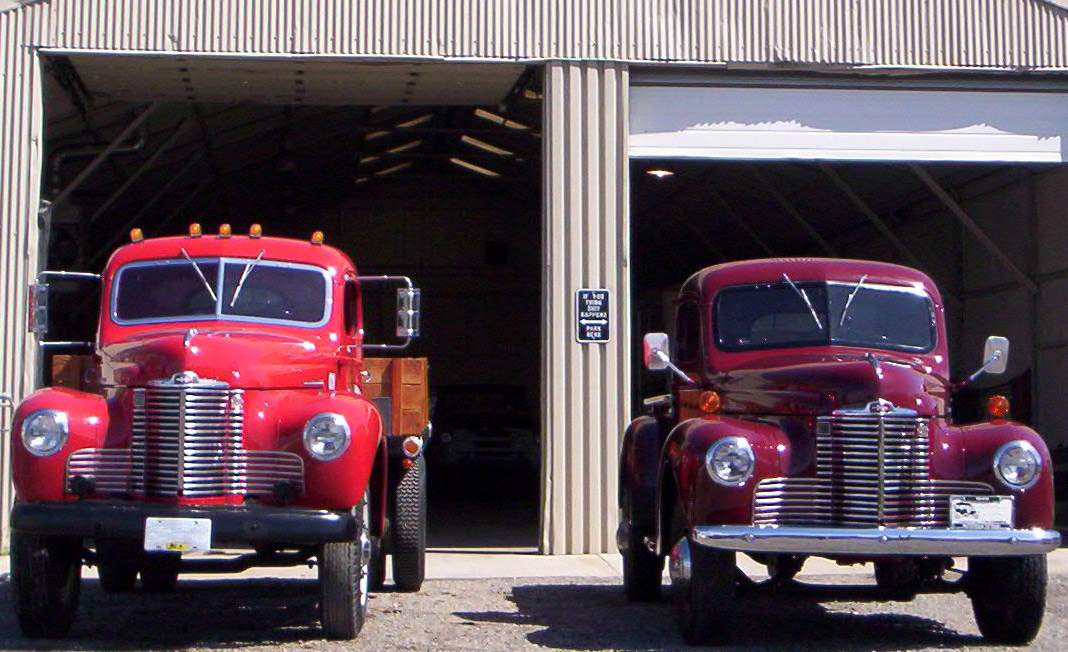
KB-5 (left) and KB-3

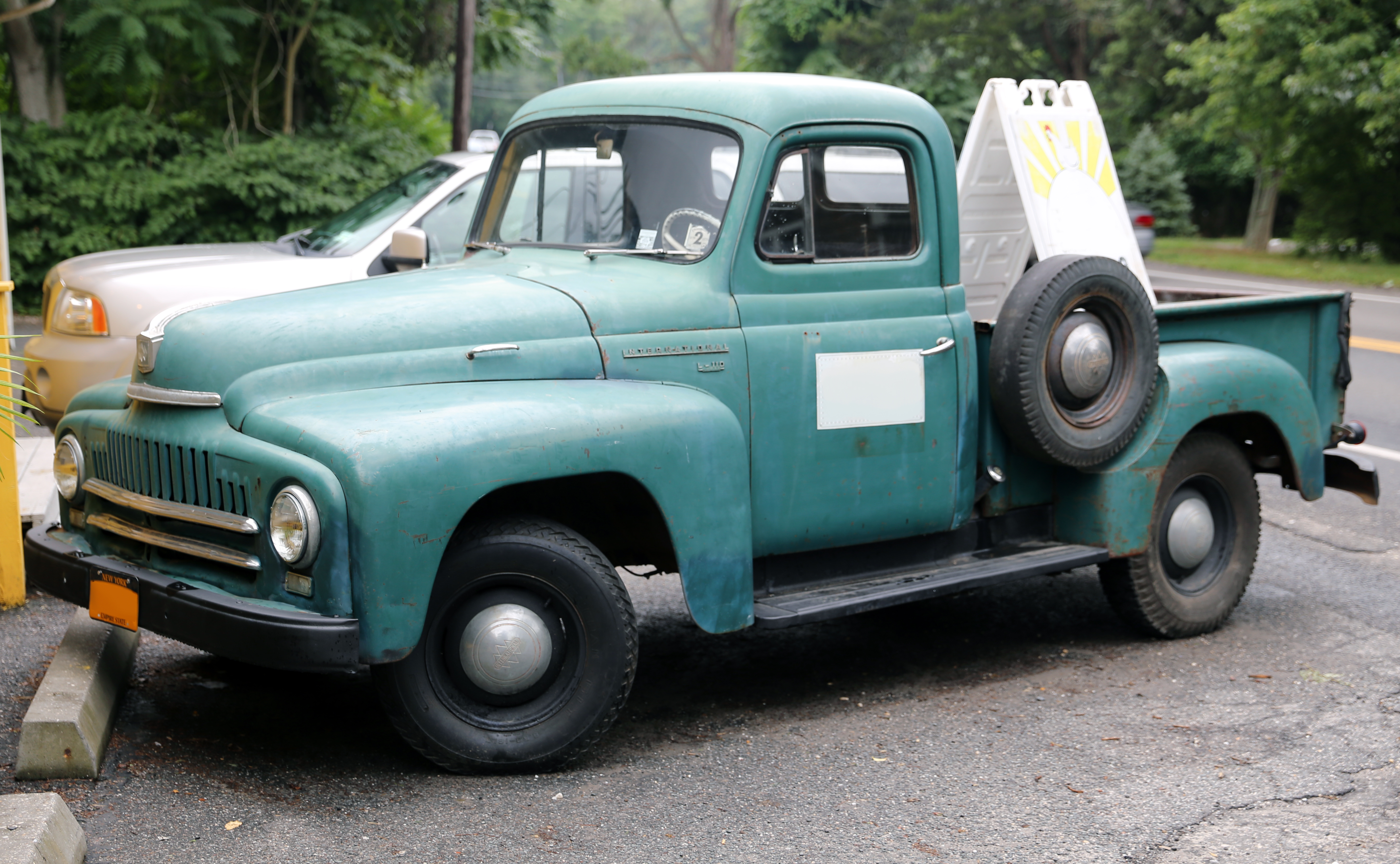
L-110

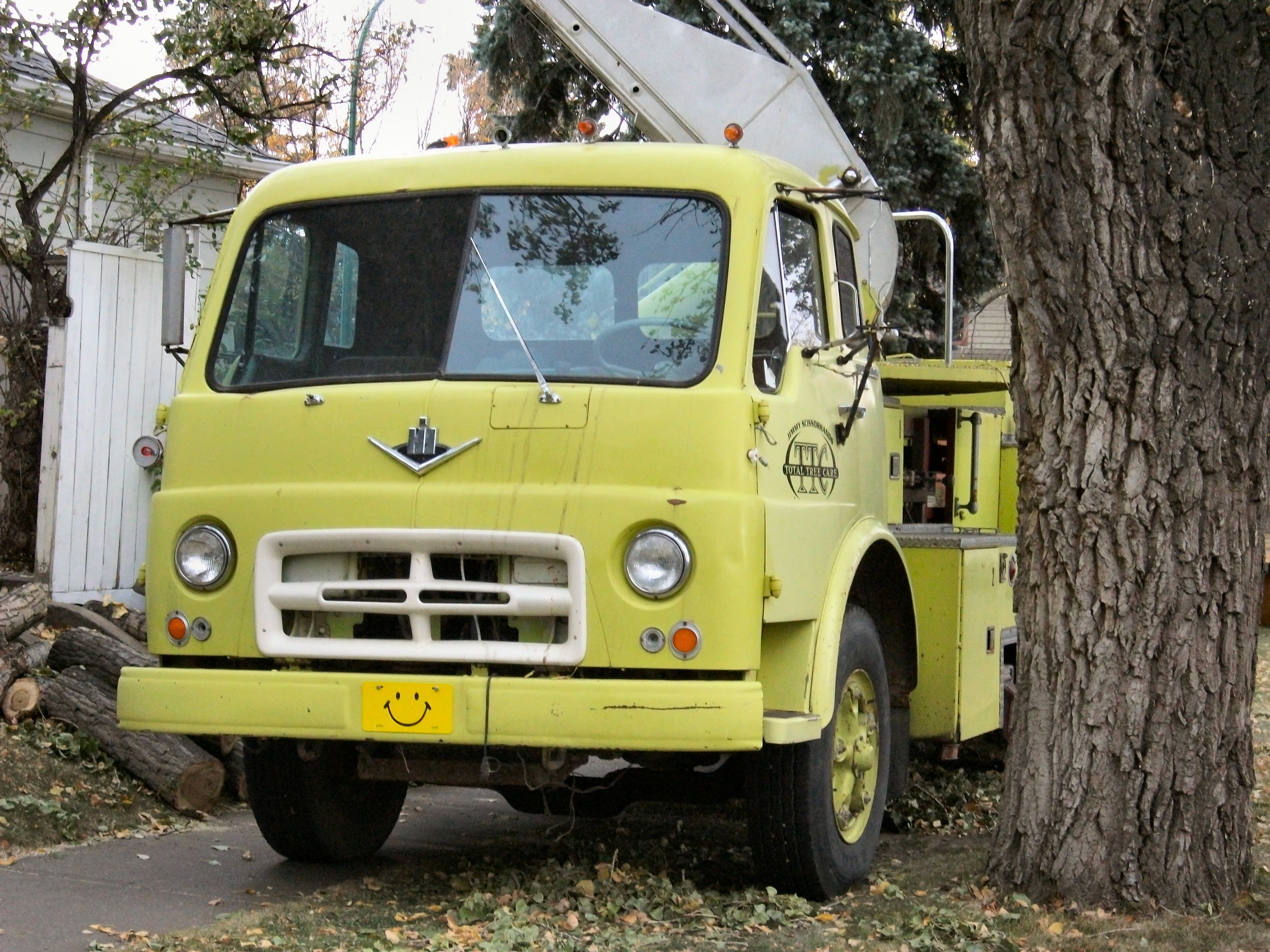
V series COE

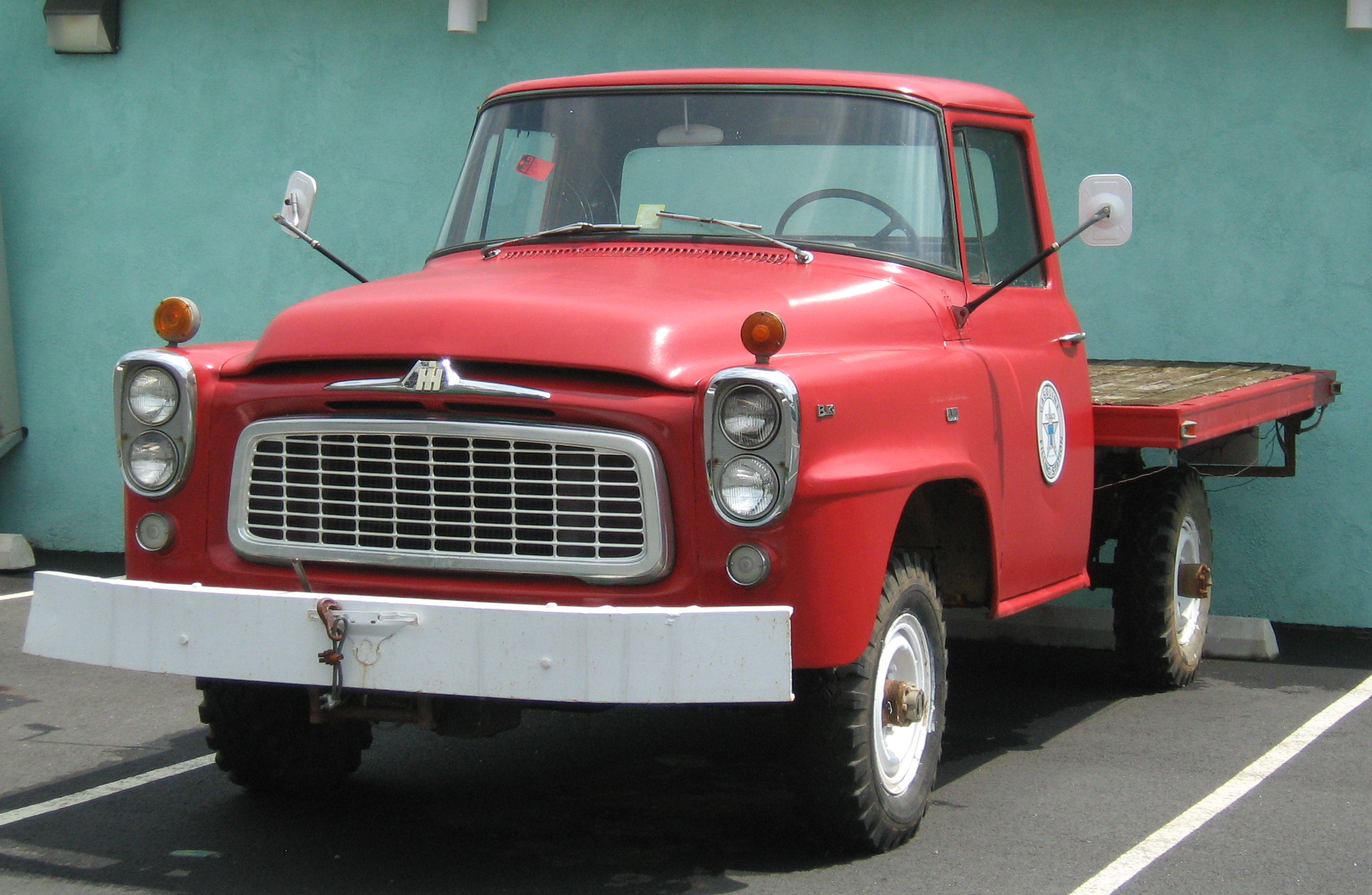
1959/1960 B-120

=== K and KB series (1941-1949) ===
The K series was a complete range of trucks introduced in December 1940. It was an update of the D series of 1937 with cosmetic changes. In 1947 the K was updated as the KB. All types of bodies were used including semi-tractors. COE models were offered until 1943. The KB was replaced by the L series in 1950.

=== L series (1949–1951) ===
The L series was a complete range of trucks introduced in late 1949. The first new trucks since the war-era D/K/KB models, they introduced a cab with a one-piece curved windshield that continued in service until 1971. They were also the first trucks with the Raymond Loewy "IH" insignia that was used into the 1970s. All types of bodies were used, models above the 170 were available as semi-tractors. Cab-over-engine models were available from 1950. The L-series was replaced by the R Series in 1952.

=== R series (1953-1967) ===
The R series was a complete range of trucks introduced in 1953. It was an update of the L series, with the same cab, cosmetic changes to the front end, and more engines available. Cab-over-engine models were available. All types of bodies were used, models R-190 and above were available as semi-tractors. In 1955 the light and medium-sized models were replaced with the S Series. The heavy-duty versions were replaced by the FleetStar A in 1968.

=== V series (1953-1967) ===
The V series a range of heavy-duty high-power trucks introduced in 1953. It used the same cab as the R series, but had a shorter hood with a large rectangular grill opening. The series was developed for a new large V8 type engine. Cab-over-engine models were available. They were replaced in by the FleetStar in 1968.

=== A and B series (1957-1964) ===
The A series was a line of light and medium trucks introduced in 1957. A special A-100 Golden Jubilee Model had a gold and white paint scheme. It had modern styling and introduced a new, wider cab that would be used until 1976. A 1959 update changed the name to B series. A variant, the AC/BC, a modified conventional with a shorter hood, led directly to the LoadStar, which replaced them in 1962. Light duty B Series models were replaced by the C Series in 1965.

== 1960–1969 ==
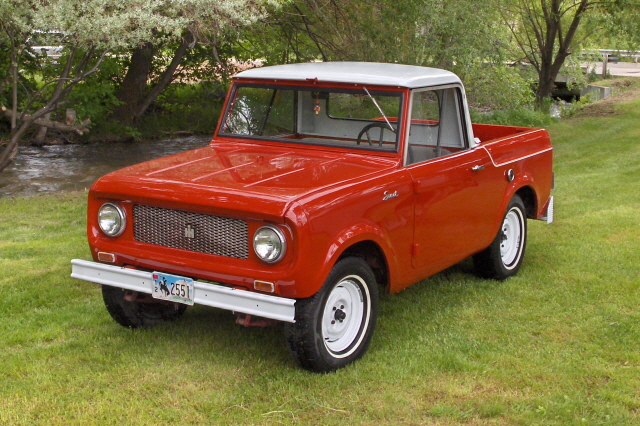
1961 Scout 80

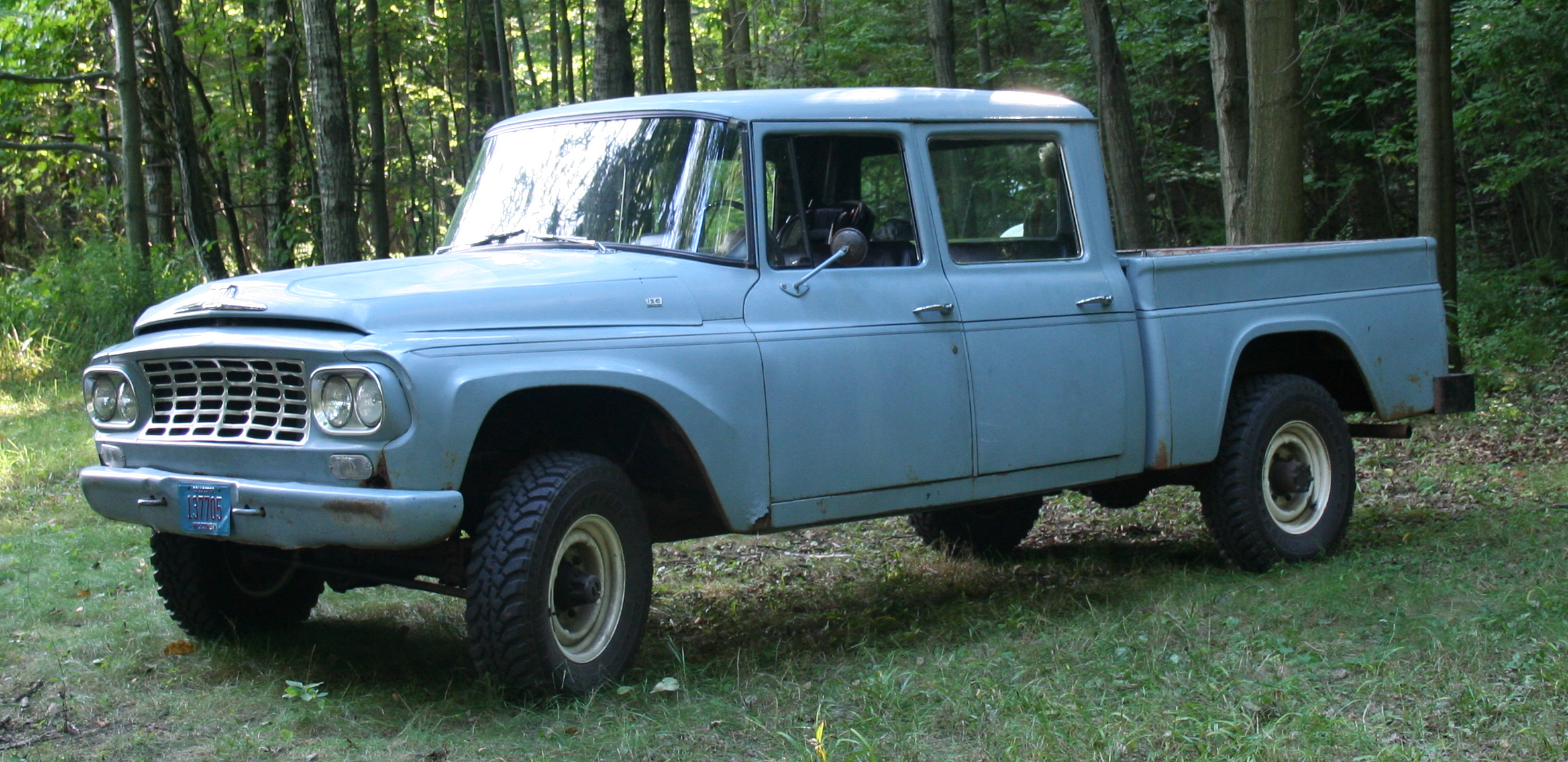
1961 C-120 4x4

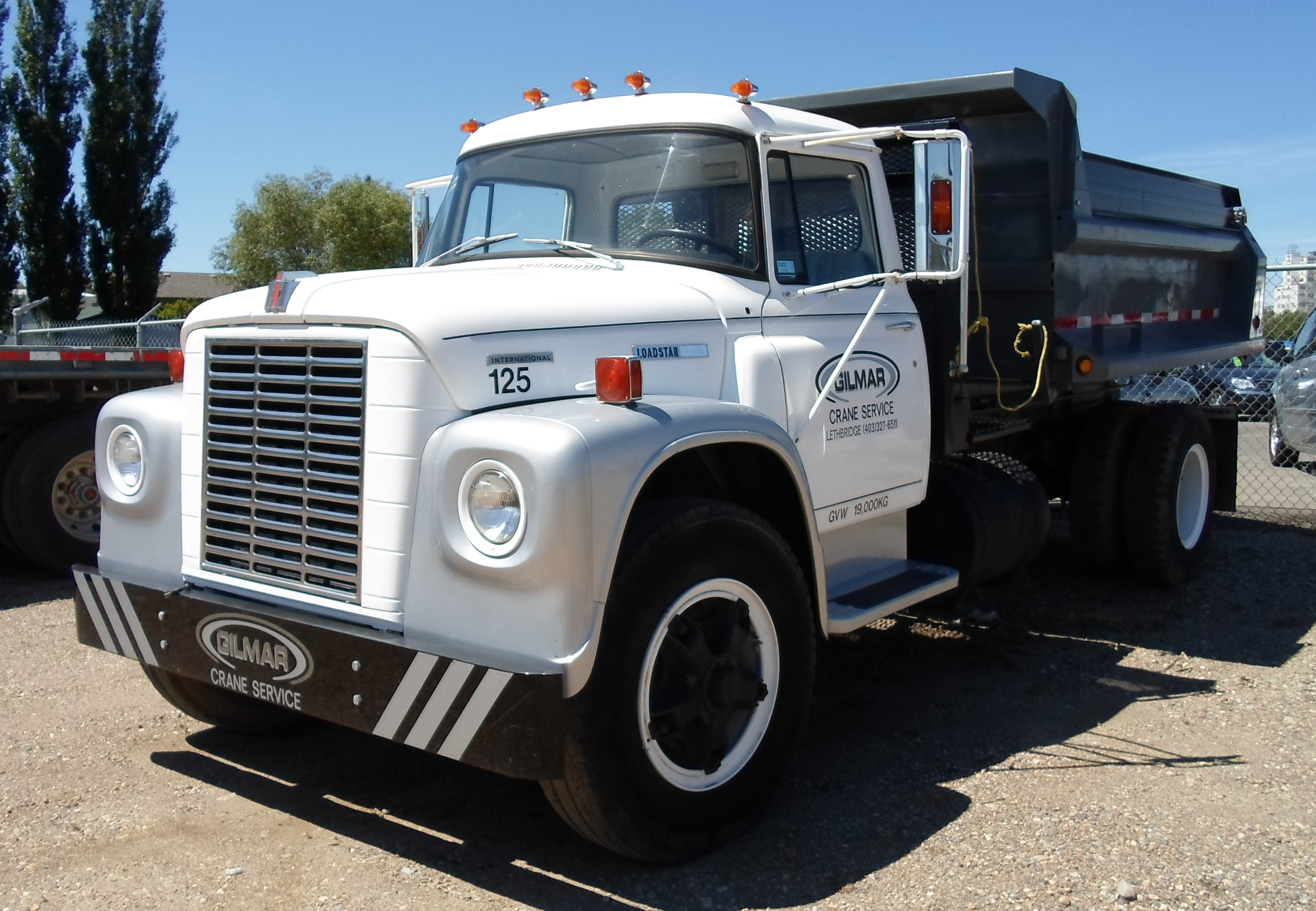
Loadstar

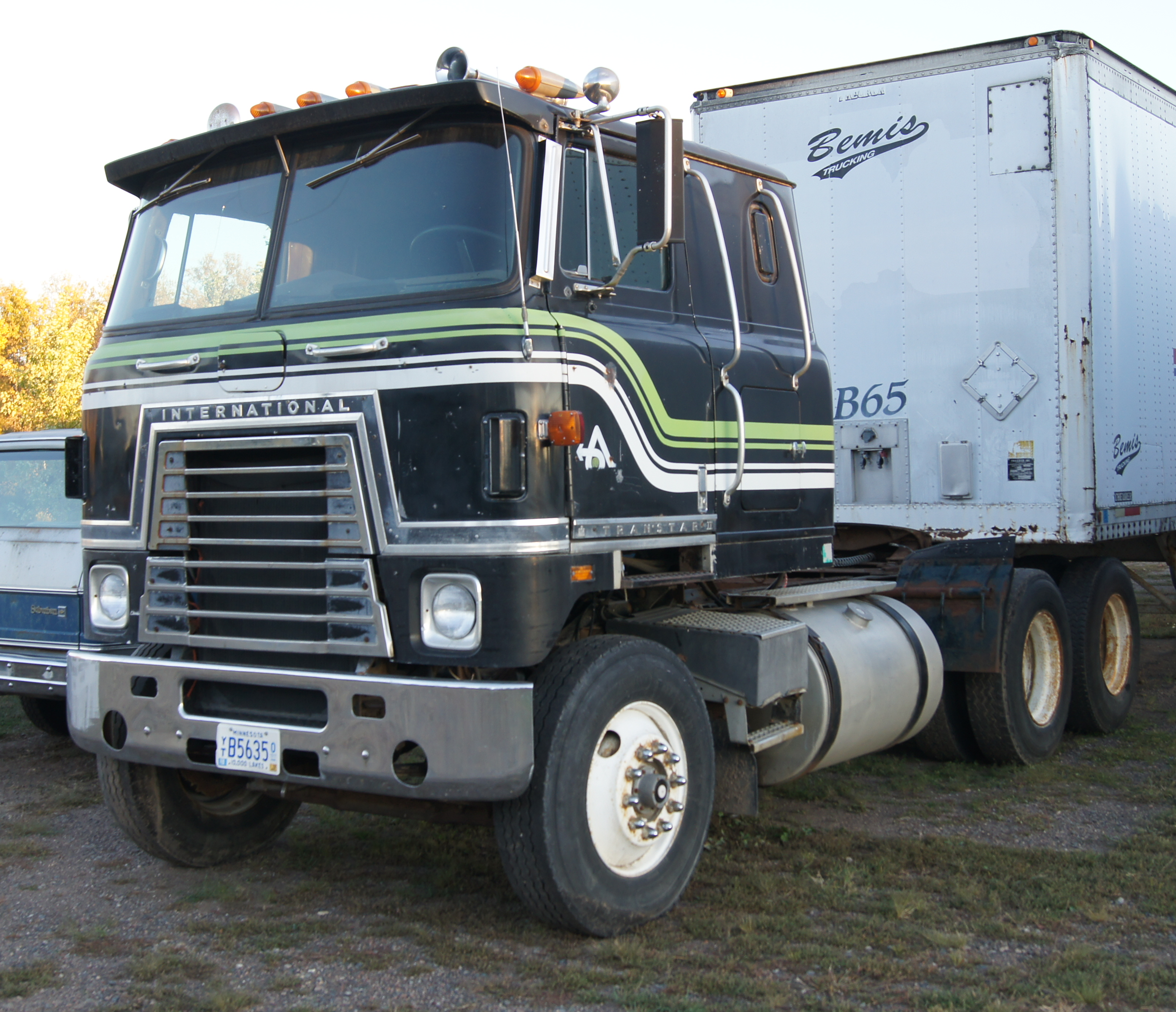
CO 4070B

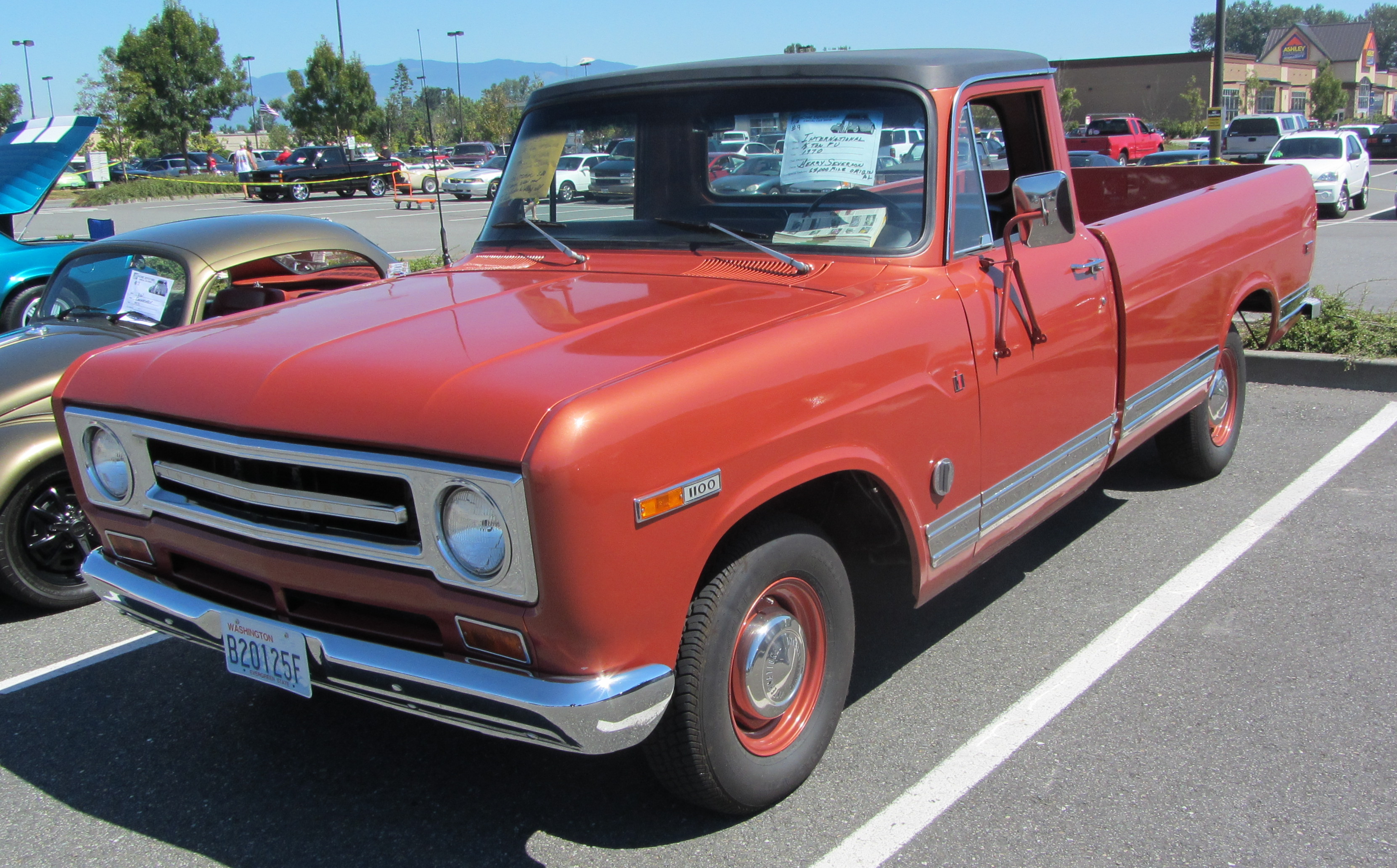
1970 1100

=== Scout / Scout II (1961-1979) ===
The Scout was a small utility vehicle introduced in 1961. It was an open two-door with a flat panel body. It could have removable pickup or full-length roofs, in both folding and hard types. The Scout was designed to be a utility truck with four-wheel drive, but most were sold as personal recreational vehicles with full-length roofs. The Scout and updated Scout II continued in production largely unchanged until discontinued in 1980.

=== Loadstar (1962-1976) ===
The Loadstar was a medium-duty short-hood conventional introduced in 1962. Cab-over-engine models were also available until replaced by the Cargostar in 1971. The Loadstar was used for local delivery, construction, farming, and as a semi-tractor. The Loadstar was replaced by the S Series in 1977.

=== FleetStar (1963-1976) ===
The FleetStar was a heavy-duty short-hood conventional. It was introduced in 1962 and entered production in 1963. The cab, grey grill, and "butterfly" hood were the same as used on the LoadStar. In 1969 a one-piece tilting hood became standard. The FleetStar was used as both a local straight truck with mid-range engines and as a semi-tractor with heavy-duty engines. The FleetStar was replaced by the S-Series in 1977.

=== TranStar / TranStar II CO4070 (1968-1983) ===
The TranStar cab-over-engine models were heavy-duty over-the-road semi-tractors introduced in 1968. Daycab models were available but most had a sleeper compartment. In 1974 the improved raised cab CO4070B TranStar II was introduced and the low-cab version was discontinued. The TranStar II was replaced by the CO9670 in 1984.

=== D series (1969-1975) ===
The D-Series was a light duty conventional introduced in 1969. It had an entirely new body with a simple flat panel design similar to the smaller Scout. They were used as pickup trucks and chassis-cabs for dump, platform, and specialty bodies. The Travelall station wagon and Travelette crew-cab pickup were also offered. The D-Series was International's last light truck and was discontinued in 1975.

== 1970-1979 ==
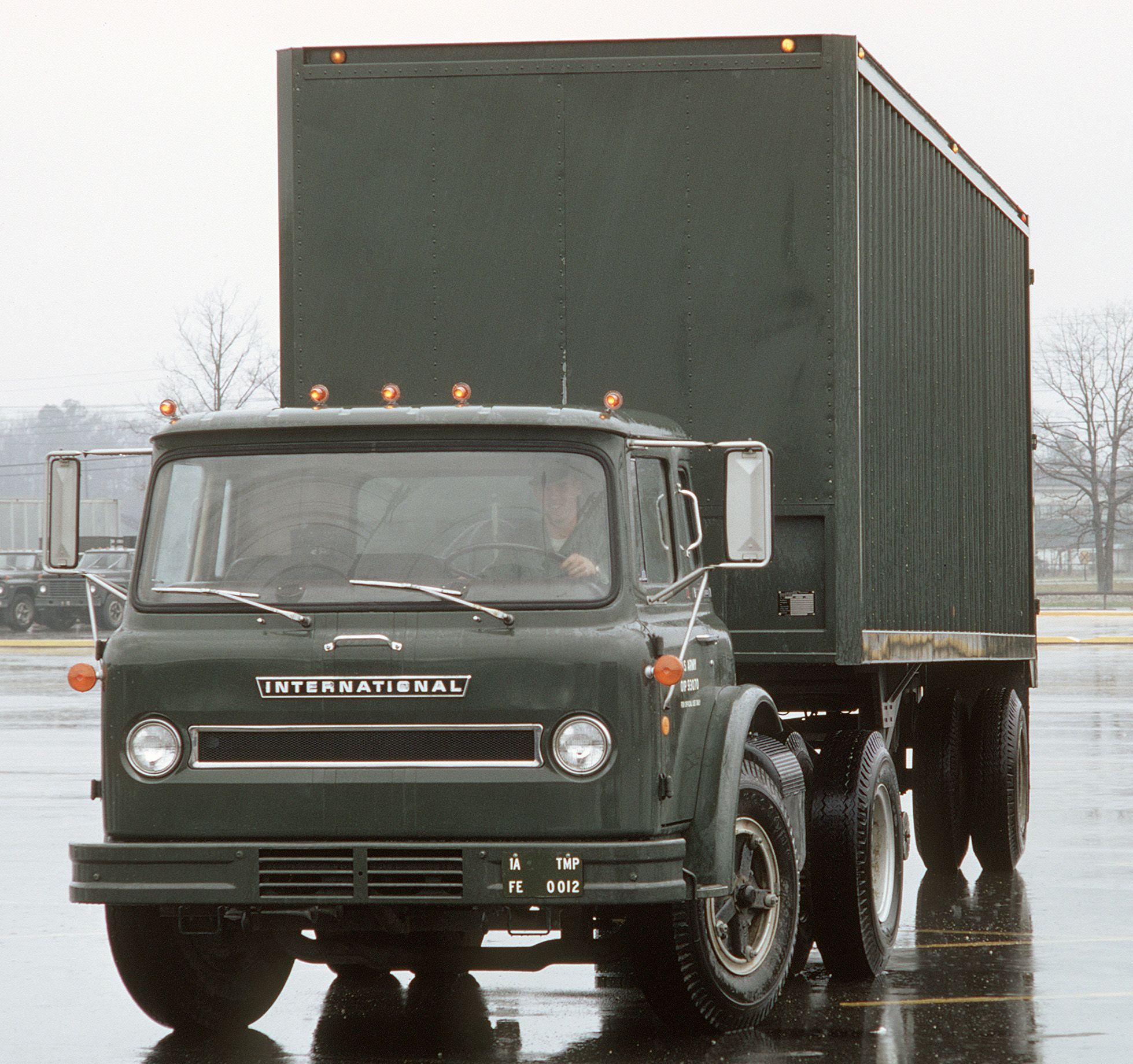
Cargostar

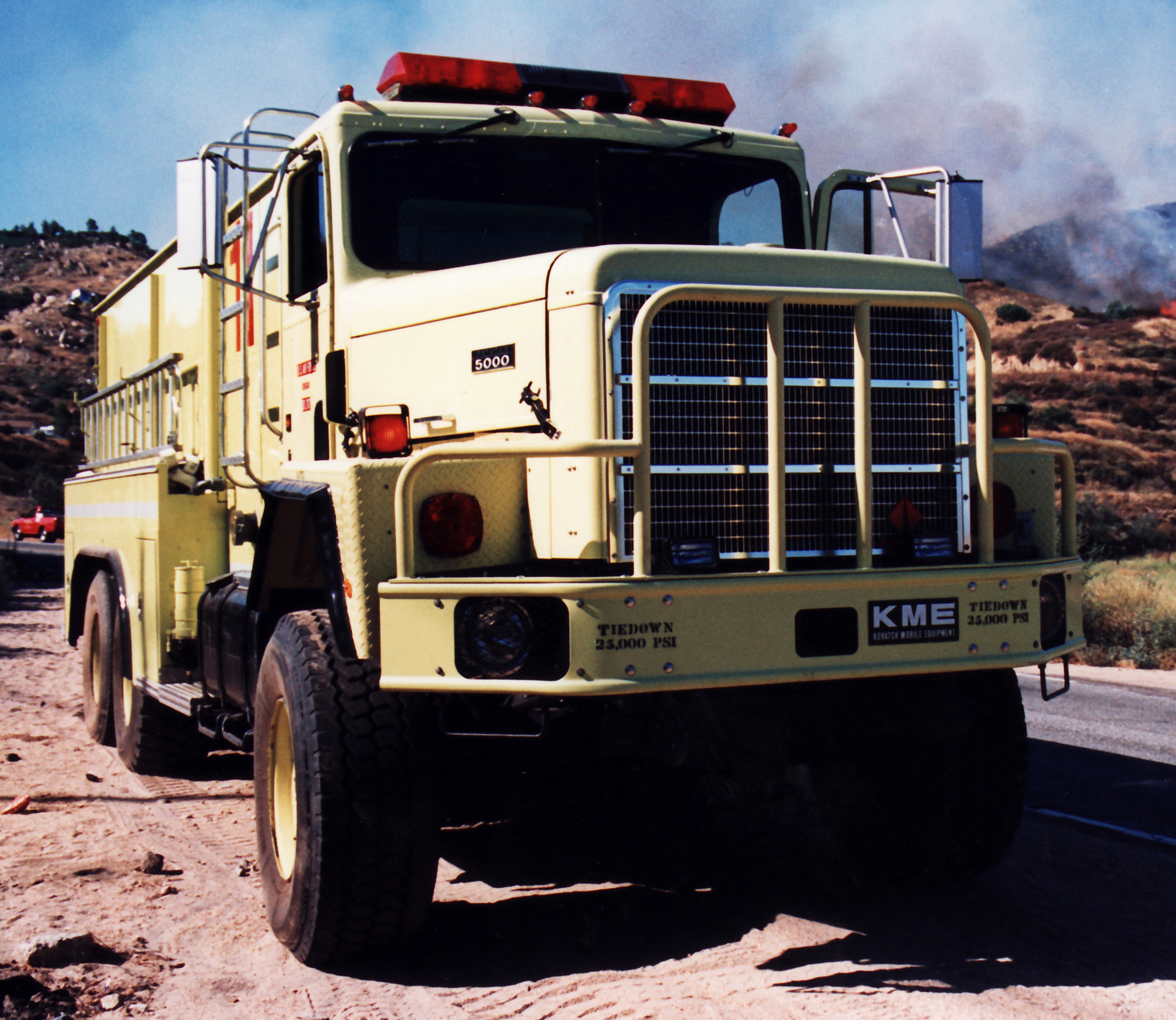
Paystar 5000

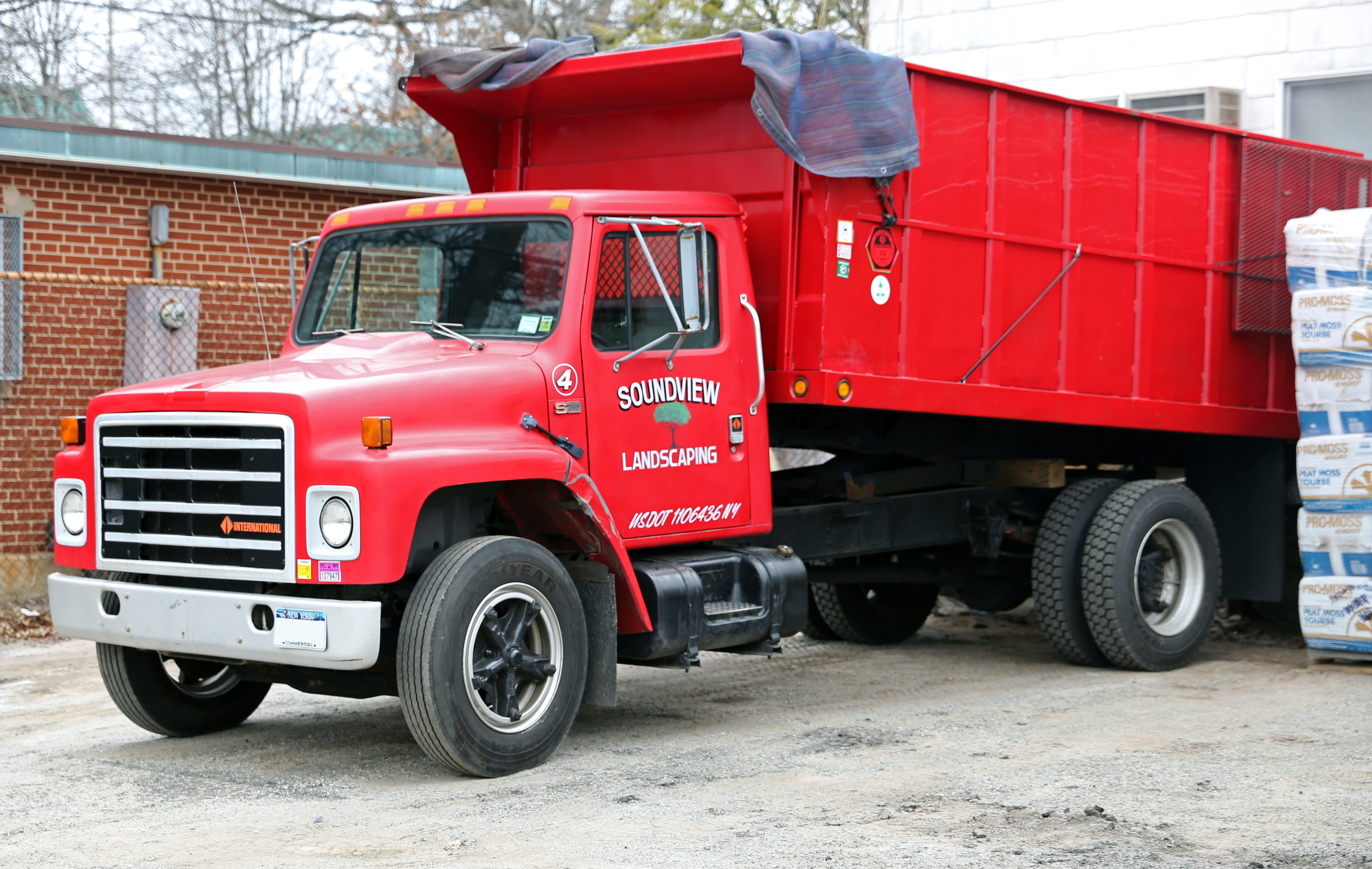
1989 S1754

=== CargoStar (1970–1986) ===
The CargoStar was a forward control cab-over-engine medium-duty series introduced in 1970. Replacing the cab-over-engine LoadStar models, the CargoStar had an improved cab and heavier models. The CargoStar's maneuverability made it useful in cities as straight trucks, larger models could be local semi-tractors. The CargoStar was discontinued in 1986.

=== TranStar 4200/4300 (1971–1984) ===
The TranStar was a heavy-duty long hood conventional introduced in 1971. It had a new cab that would also be used by the new PayStar. A large forward tilting rectangular hood had a very large grille area. The TranStar was used as a semi-tractor for local construction, regional hauling, and long distance over-the-road trucking. In 1985 the TranStar was renamed the 9370.

=== PayStar 5000 (1972–1998) ===
The PayStar was a severe service conventional introduced in 1972. It used the same cab as the TranStar 4200/4300 and had a long, rectangular hood. It had a set-back front axle with a butterfly hood and flat diamond plate fenders. In 1973 a set-forward front axle model with a tilting fiberglass hood was added. The PayStar was commonly used for straight trucks like heavy-duty dump trucks, concrete mixers, and off-road fire apparatus. The PayStar was built with few changes until replaced by the new generation 5000i Series in 1999.

=== S series (1977–2004) ===
The S series was a range of medium and heavy-duty conventional trucks that was introduced in 1977 to replace and widen the LoadStar and FleetStar lines. It used a new cab with flat panels and forward tilting hood in different lengths. The series was very wide, from the medium duty 1600 to the regional semi-tractor 2500 and severe-service 2600. In 1988 medium-duty production ended, replaced by the 4000 Series. Other models were replaced between then and when the last Schoolmaster was built in 2004.

== 1980–1999 ==
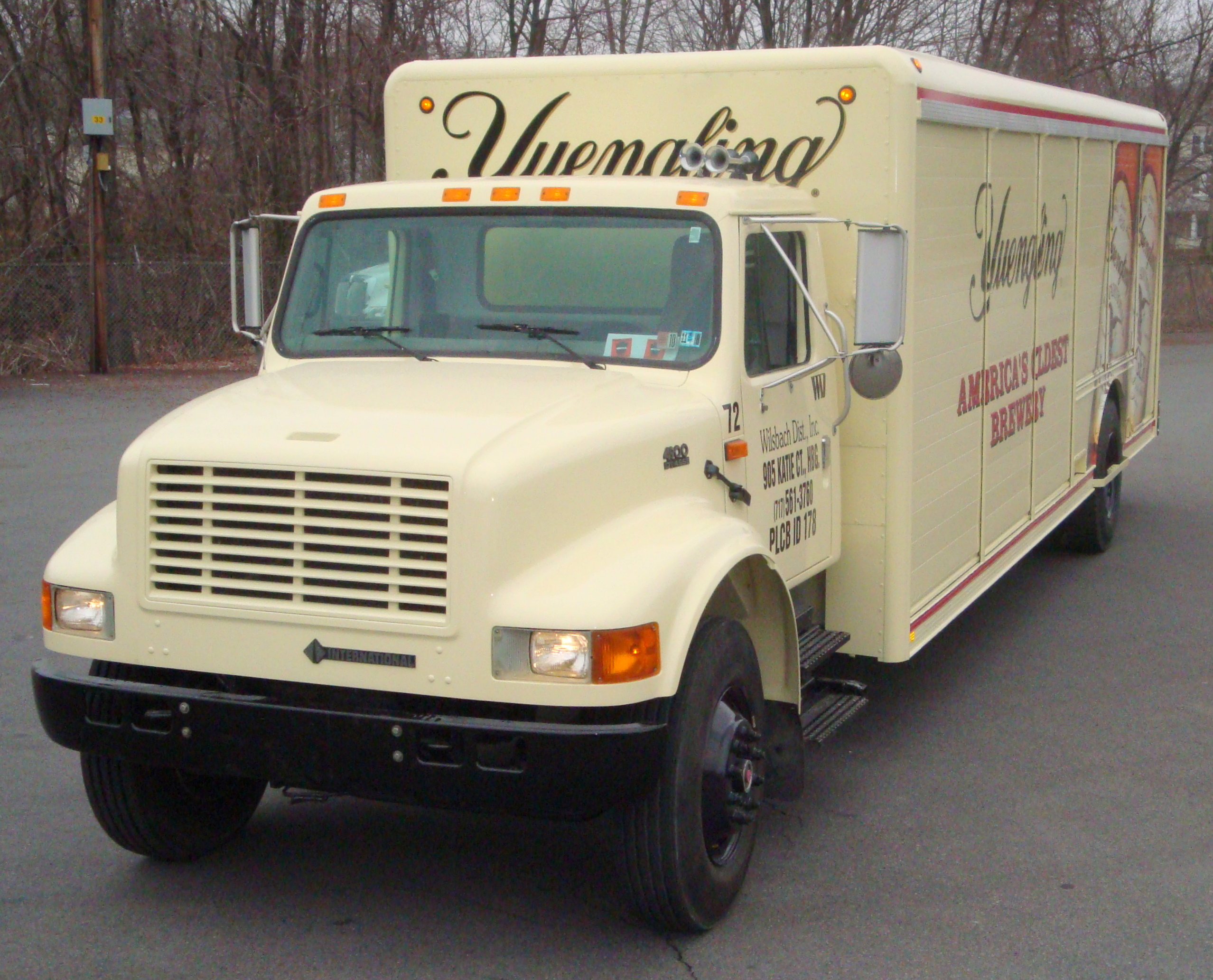
4900

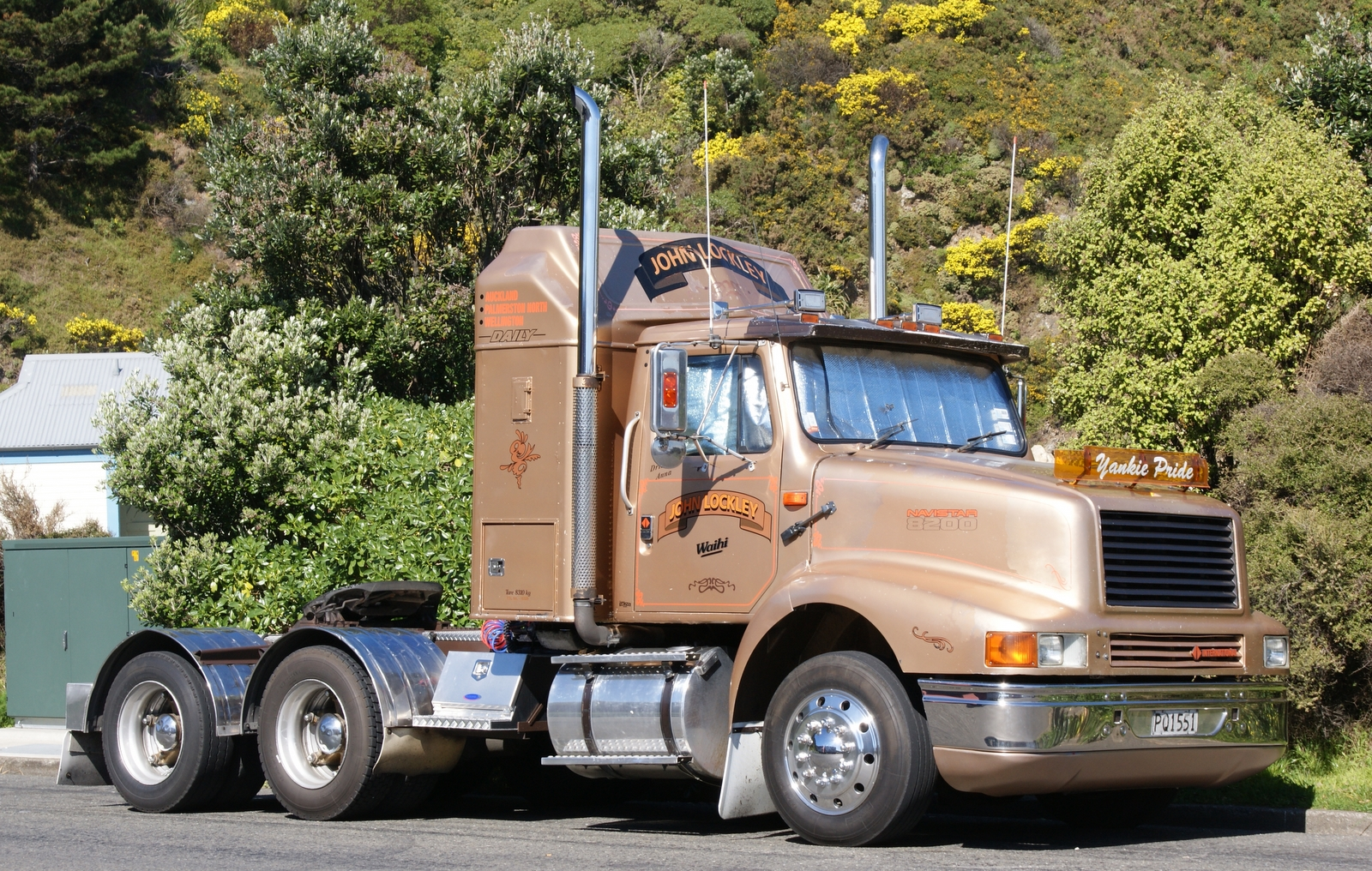
8200 with long hood

=== 4000 Series (1988–2002) ===
The 4000 Series were medium duty trucks introduced in 1988. They used an S Series cab with a new low-profile hood that improved driver visibility and reduced air resistance. Day and crew cabs were available. They were commonly used for local delivery and vocational work but there were also semi-tractor, service, and specialty models. They were replaced by the "New Generation Vehicle" 4000 Series in 2002/2003.

=== 8000 Series (1987–2000) ===
The 8000 Series were heavy-duty semi-tractors introduced in 1987. They used an S Series cab with a low-profile hood, a set-back front axle allowed the front fenders to be tapered and low-drag. A less aerodynamic short hood similar to the 4000 series was used when overall length was important. Intended for regional highway use with high fuel efficiency, there is a very wide range of aerodynamic aids for both short and long hood models. A similar mid-range 7100 was available in 1989-1990. The 8000 Series was replaced by the New Generation Vehicle 8000 Series in 2002.

=== 9000i Series (1984–1999) ===
The 9000i Series are heavy-duty semi-tractors. They were introduced in 1984 as an update of the TranStar 4200/4300, which they eventually replaced. The 4200/4300/9000i design remained largely unchanged from their introduction in 1970 until replaced by the new generation 9000i series in 1999. The 9000i were almost exclusively used as semi-tractors but a few straight trucks were built.

They used an aluminum day-cab also used by the PayStar 5000 conventional and had a long rectangular hood. Most were set-forward front axle models but in 1989 a set-back front axle with a lower-profile hood was introduced. When used for long-distances an external "box" type sleeper could be fitted.

The long hood and large grill area allowed the largest highway engines to be used. Caterpillar, Cummins, and Detroit Diesel engines were available with up to 480 horsepower (360 kW). Fuller manual transmissions with 5 to 15-speeds were available. Single and tandem, rear axles were available. Gross vehicle weight ratings (total weight of the truck) could be up to 60,000 pounds (27,000 kg) and up to 140,000 pounds (64,000 kg) including trailers.

=== CO9000 (1981-1999) ===
The CO9000 series was a heavy-duty cab-over-engine highway tractor. Introduced in 1981 to replace the TranStar II. A set-back model was introduced in 1988. Production ended in 1998.

== 2000–2010 ==
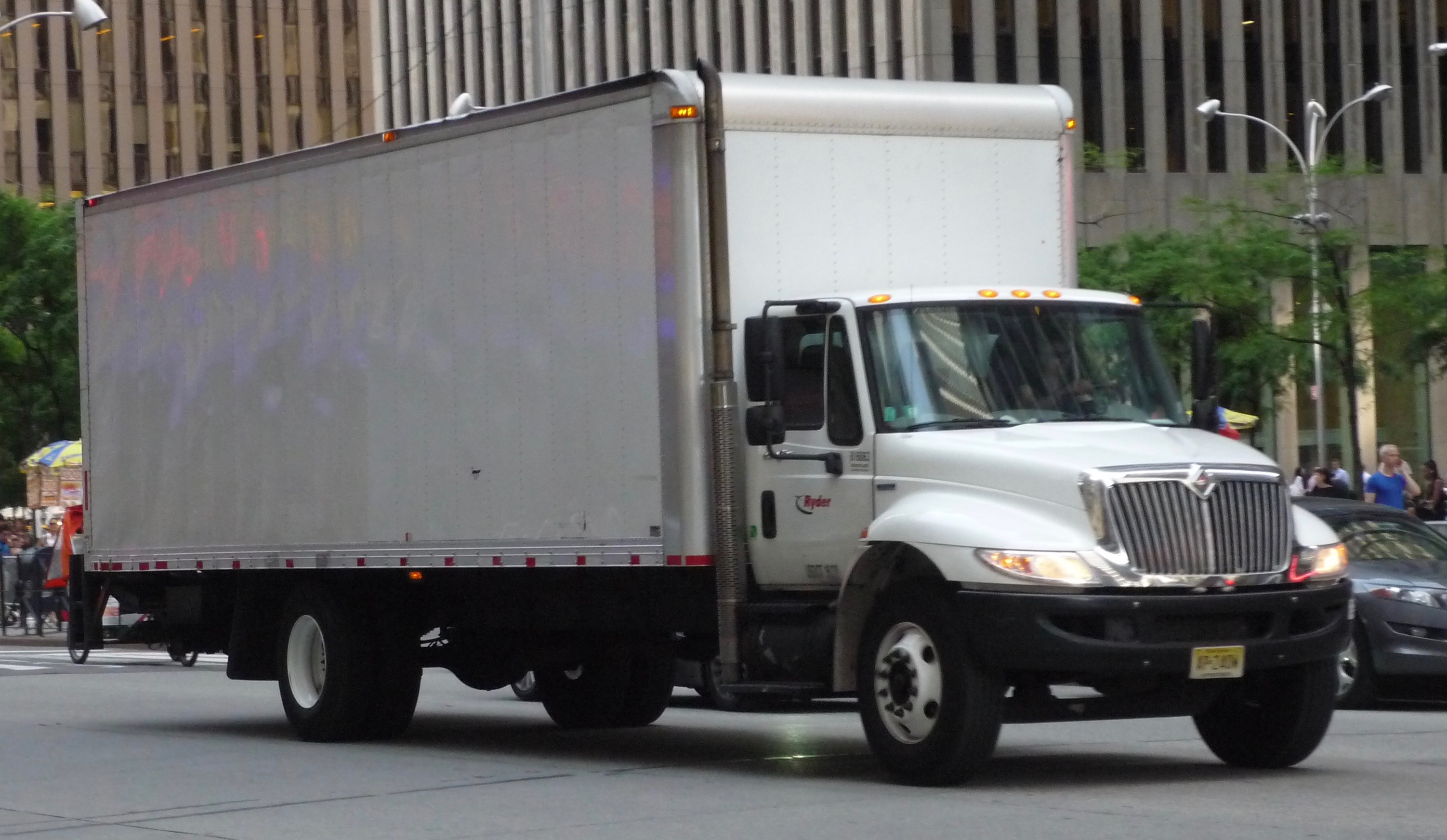
2014 4400

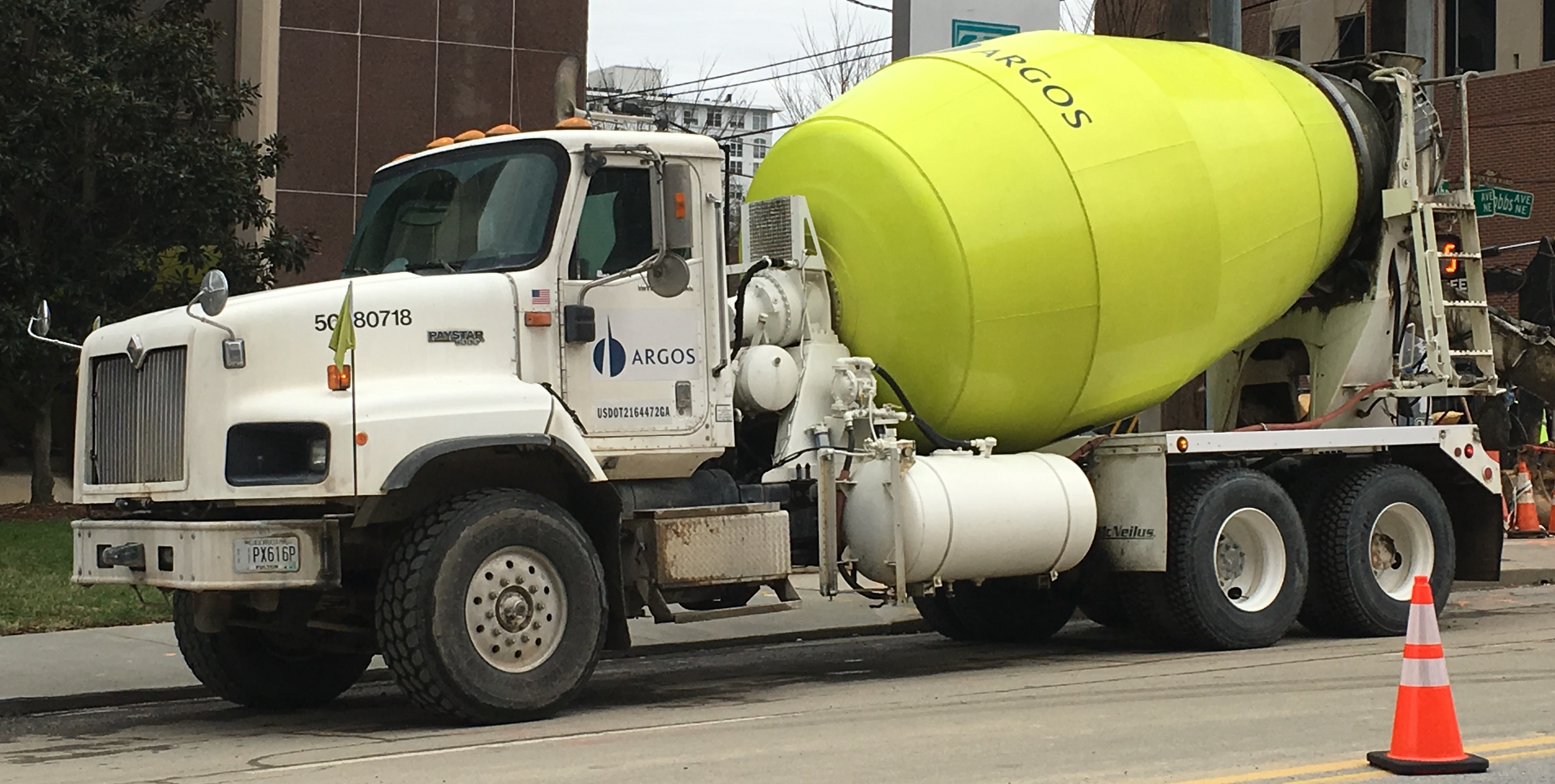
2009 PayStar 5000

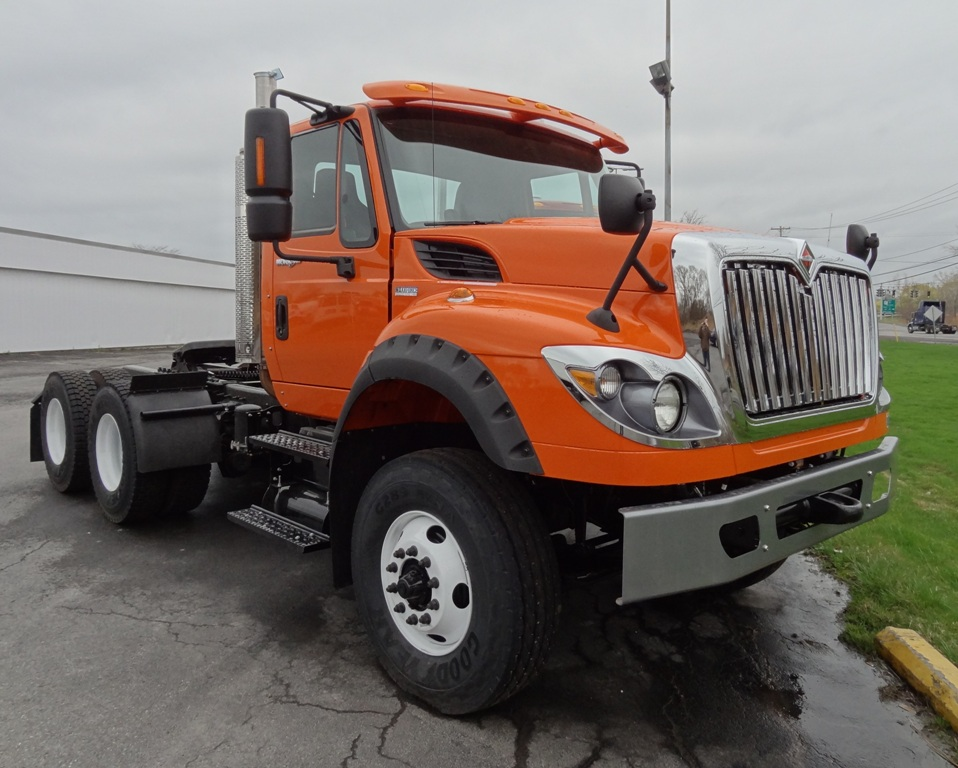
2012 7600

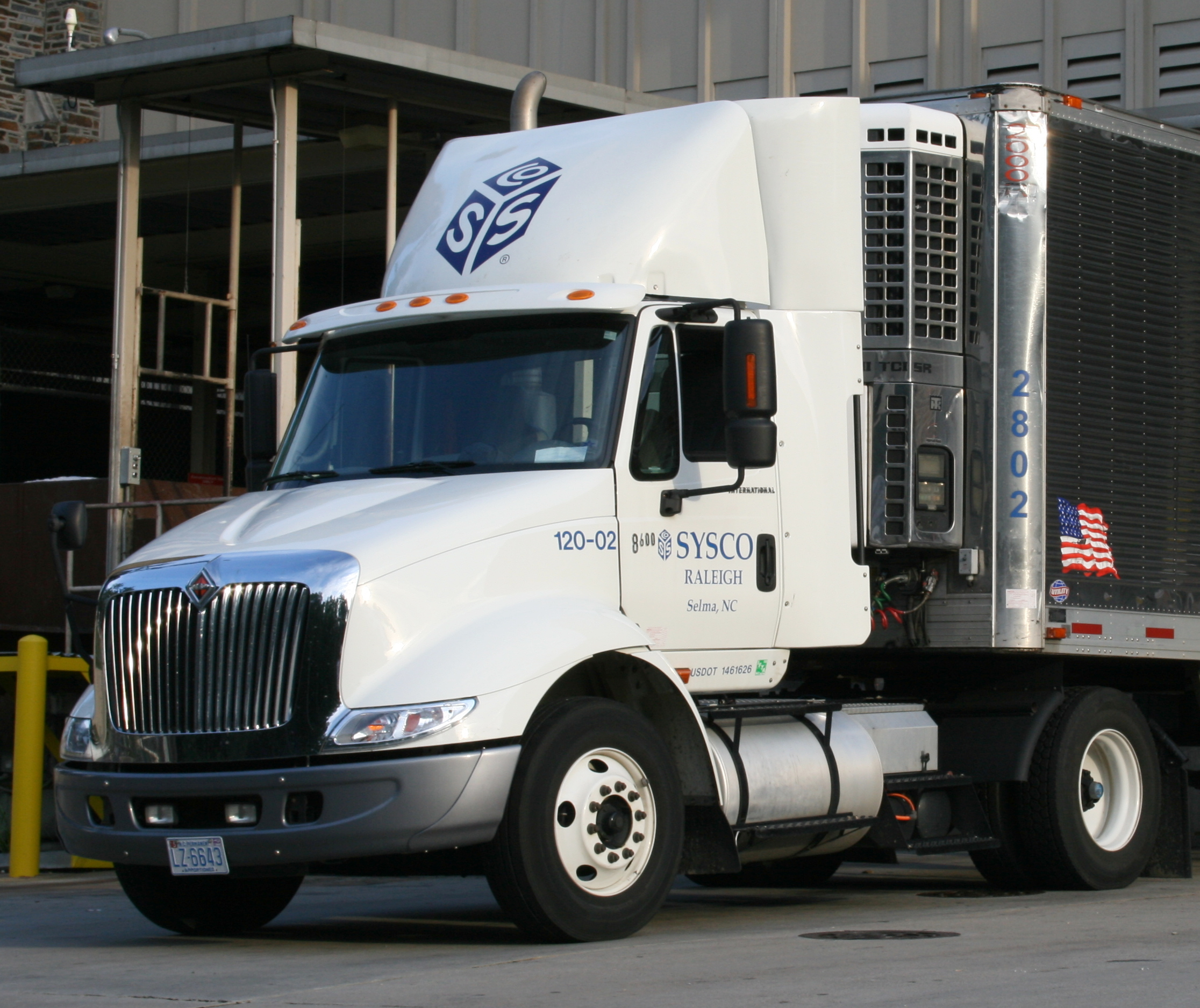
8600

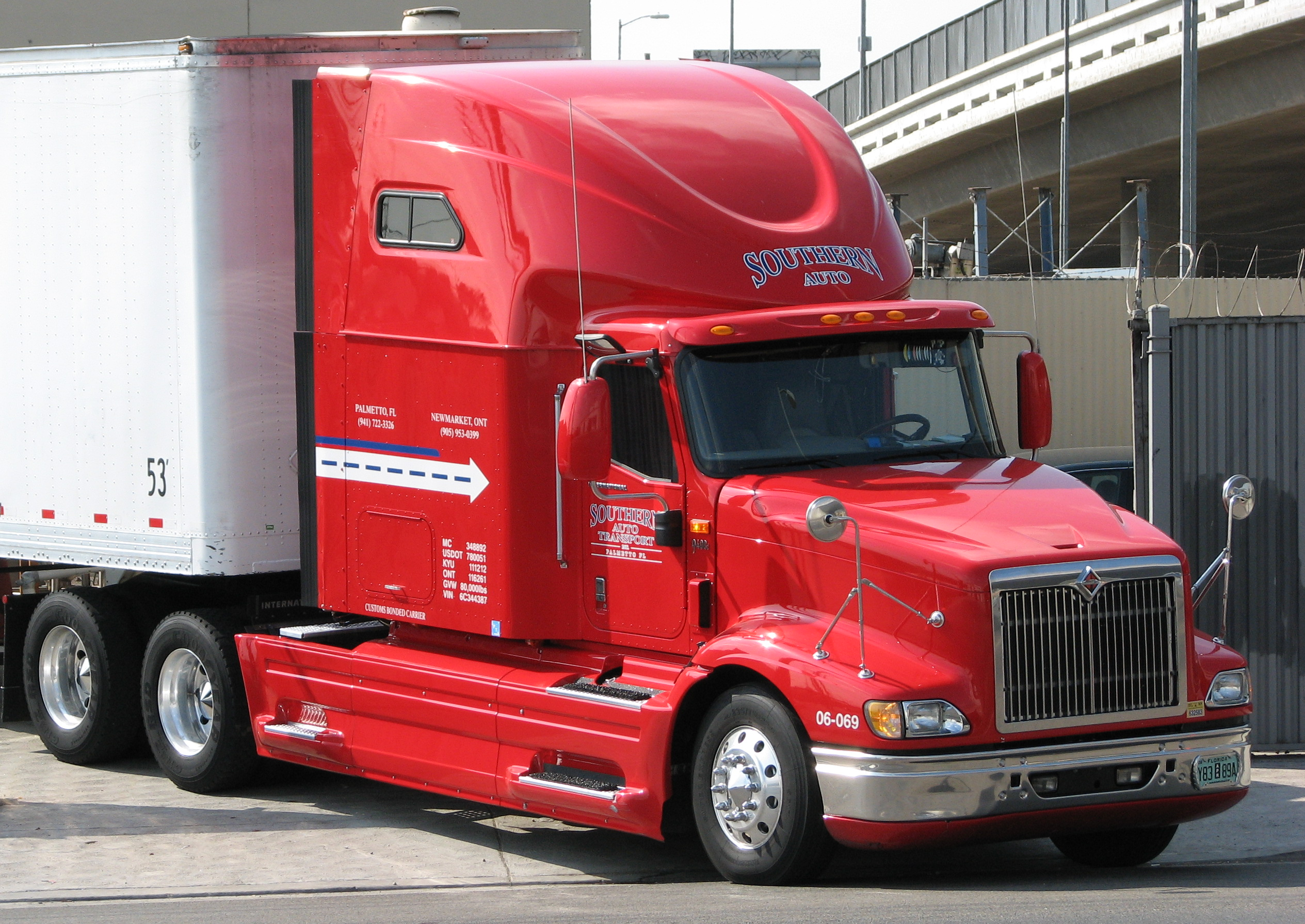
9400i

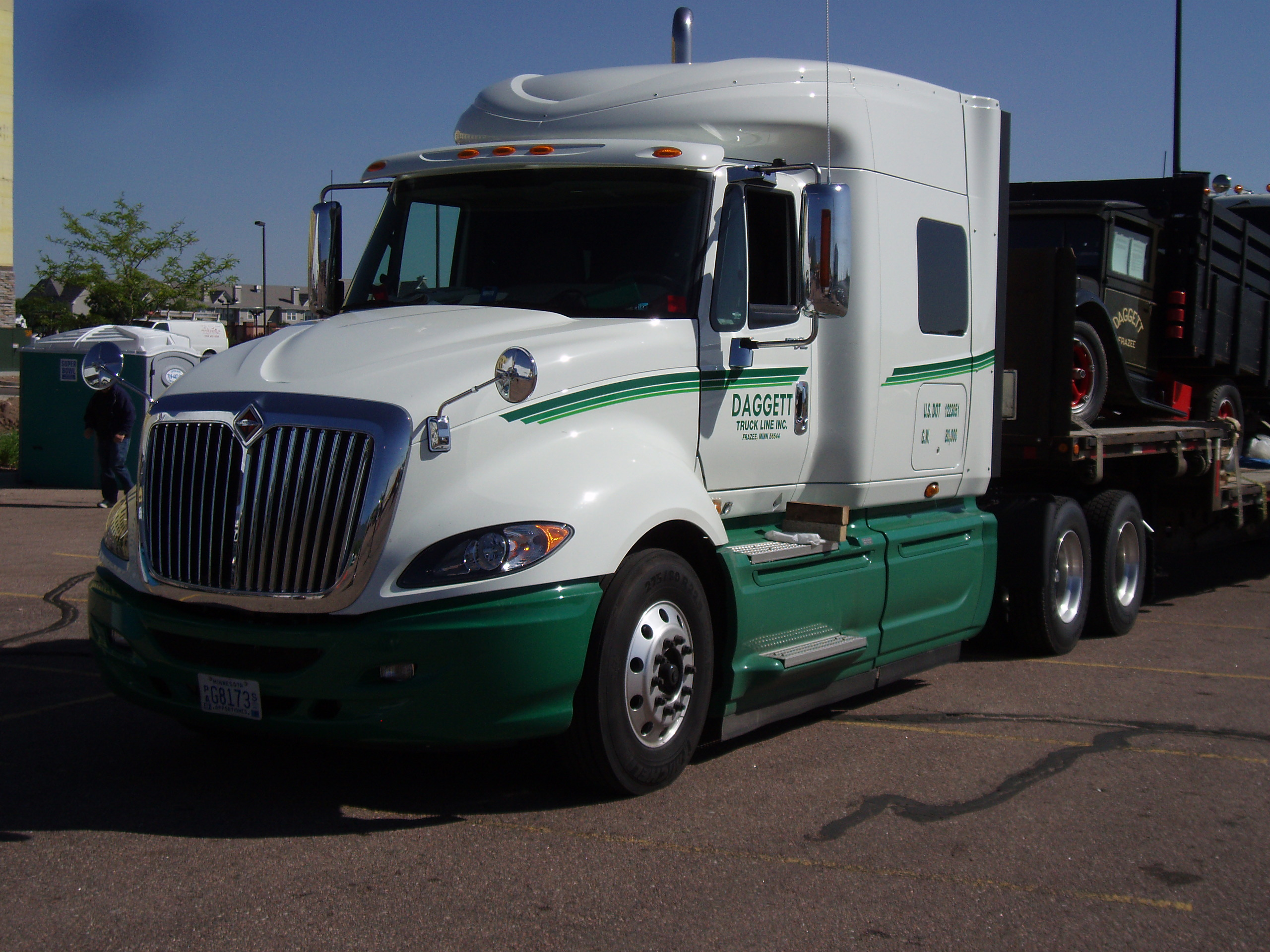
ProStar

Star nomenclature was added to the thousand number series in the 2010 model year.

=== 4000 / DuraStar (2001–2017) ===
The DuraStar is a medium-duty truck. They were introduced in 2001 as the 4400 Series and renamed DuraStar in 2010. They have the "New Generation Vehicle" (NGV) all-steel cab available as day, extended, and crew cab models. The DuraStar was replaced by the MV in 2018.

=== 5000i / PayStar (1999–2016) ===
The PayStar 5000 is a severe service truck. It was introduced in 1995 as the 5000i Series. It uses the same cab used by the 9000i. It is only available as a day-cab. It has a wide range of models with both straight and semi-tractor models. The PayStar was replaced by the HX in 2016.

=== 7000 / WorkStar (2001–2016) ===
The WorkStar is a heavy-duty truck. It was introduced in 2001 as the 7000 Series and renamed WorkStar in 2010. They have the "New Generation Vehicle" (NGV) all-steel cab available as day, extended, and crew cab models. The WorkStar was replaced by the HV in 2016.

=== 8000 / TranStar (2002–2016) ===
The TranStar is a heavy-duty highway semi-tractor with a low drag hood. It was introduced in 2002 as the 8000 Series and renamed TranStar in 2010. They have the "New Generation Vehicle" (NGV) all-steel cab available as day and extended cab models. It was intended for regional use and has no high-horsepower or sleeper models. The TranStar was replaced by the RH in 2017.

=== 9000i (2000–2017) ===
The 9000i is a heavy duty semi-tractor introduced in 2000. It uses an aluminum cab also used by the 5000i/PayStar and had a long rectangular hood. It is available as a day cab and with sleepers. The long hood allowed high-power engines to be used.

=== ProStar (2006–2016) ===
The ProStar is a heavy duty highway semi-tractor introduced in 2006. It uses the NGV cab introduced in 2001 and a low drag hood. It is intended for long-distance use and has high-horsepower and sleeper models. The ProStar was replaced by the LT in 2017.

=== LoneStar (2008–2024) ===
The International LoneStar was a Class 8 semi-trailer truck manufactured by International Trucks, powered by the Cummins X15.

=== 9900ix / Eagle (1998-2017) ===
The International 9900ix is a heavy duty semi-tractor based on the 9000i but with an extended hood and a 130-inch BBC.

== 2011-present ==
=== HX Series (2016–present) ===
The HX Series are severe duty trucks introduced in 2016 to replace the PayStar. The HX uses the same cab that and hood the PayStar used. The series has a wide range of models with both straight and semi-tractor models.

=== HV Series (2017–present) ===
The HV Series are severe duty trucks introduced in 2017 to replace the WorkStar. They use the improved NGV cab with single door windows. Primarily a vocational straight truck they are often used as dump and concrete mixer trucks.

=== LT Series (2017–present) ===
The LT Series are heavy-duty semi-tractors introduced in 2017 to replace the ProStar. They use the improved NGV cab with single door windows and a low drag hood. They can have a high-power engine and are meant for long-distance highway use.

=== RH Series (2017–present) ===
The RH Series are heavy-duty semi-tractors introduced in 2017 to replace the TranStar. They use the improved NGV cab with single door windows.

=== MV Series (2018–present) ===
The MV series are medium-duty trucks introduced in 2018 to replace the DuraStar. They use the improved NGV cab with single door windows. They are commonly used for local delivery, utility, and vocational work.

=== CV Series (2018–present) ===
The CV Series are medium-duty trucks introduced in 2018, and developed in a joint venture with General Motors, which markets the vehicle as the Silverado 4500HD, 5500HD, and 6500HD. It is an entirely new truck with its own cab and styling. It is marketed as tow, dump, service and utility trucks.
