= National Register of Historic Places listings in Jackson County, Oklahoma =

Location of Jackson County in Oklahoma

This is a list of the National Register of Historic Places listings in Jackson County, Oklahoma.

This is intended to be a complete list of the properties on the National Register of Historic Places in Jackson County, Oklahoma, U.S. The locations of National Register properties for which the latitude and longitude coordinates are included below may be seen in a map.

There are 11 properties listed on the National Register in the county.

This National Park Service list is complete through NPS recent listings posted March 21, 2025.

== Current listings ==
	Name on the Register	Image	Date listed	Location	City or town	Description
1	Altus Junior College Library		March 5, 2024 (#100010049)	221 North Park Lane; 34°38′22″N 99°19′00″W	Altus	
2	W. C. Baker House	W. C. Baker House	December 16, 2005 (#05001417)	301 E. Commerce; 34°38′21″N 99°19′50″W	Altus	
3	Cross S Ranch Headquarters		March 8, 2006 (#06000119)	1.3 miles (2.1 km) west and 0.4 miles (0.64 km) north of the junction of County Roads N199 and E1750; 34°29′05″N 99°26′11″W	Olustee	
4	Downtown Altus Historic District	Downtown Altus Historic District	June 11, 2018 (#100002543)	Broadway, Main, Hudson & Commerce Sts. 34°38′19″N 99°20′06″W	Altus	
5	Frazer Cemetery	Frazer Cemetery	June 8, 2011 (#11000336)	0.5 miles (0.80 km) south of junction of County Rd. 202 & US 62, 2 miles (3.2 km) west of the Jackson County Courthouse; 34°37′49″N 99°22′10″W	Altus	
6	Fullerton Dam		November 7, 1976 (#76001562)	7 miles (11 km) northwest of Olustee; 34°37′27″N 99°29′27″W	Olustee	
7	Elmer and Lela Garnett House	Elmer and Lela Garnett House	June 8, 2011 (#11000337)	801 E. Commerce St. 34°38′21″N 99°19′28″W	Altus	
8	Jackson County Courthouse and Jail	Jackson County Courthouse and Jail	August 23, 1984 (#84003064)	Main St. and Broadway; also 101 N. Main St. 34°38′18″N 99°20′03″W	Altus	101 Main represents a boundary increase of September 4, 2008 (#08000901)
9	Olustee Public Library and Park	Olustee Public Library and Park	March 8, 2006 (#06000116)	Southern side of 4th St. between C and D Sts. 34°32′53″N 99°25′22″W	Olustee	
10	Perryman Ranch Headquarters	Perryman Ranch Headquarters	April 4, 2007 (#07000260)	0.2 miles (0.32 km) east of the junction of County Roads N193 and E159; 34°42′39″N 99°31′29″W	East Duke	
11	Wichita Falls & Northwestern Railroad Passenger Depot	Wichita Falls & Northwestern Railroad Passenger Depot	September 4, 2008 (#08000851)	523 S. Main St. 34°38′00″N 99°20′02″W	Altus	

== See also ==
- List of National Historic Landmarks in Oklahoma
- National Register of Historic Places listings in Oklahoma
