= John David Duty =

Criminal executed by lethal injection

- Photo by the Oklahoma Department of Corrections
- Born: April 25, 1952; Oklahoma, U.S.
- Died: December 16, 2010 (aged 58); Oklahoma State Penitentiary, Oklahoma, U.S.
- Other name: John David Hall
- Spouse: Pam Duty
- Children: 3
- Parent(s): Charles Houston Duty; Mildred Duty Hall
- Status: Executed by lethal injection
- Convictions: First degree murder Shooting with intent to kill Kidnapping; Rape; Robbery
- Penalty: Death

John David Duty (April 25, 1952 – December 16, 2010) was an American who was executed in Oklahoma for first-degree murder. According to the Oklahoma Department of Corrections, he was the first person in the United States to have been put to death with pentobarbital. A nationwide shortage of sodium thiopental led the state to incorporate the substitution into its protocol for lethal injections. Duty's case gained media attention because pentobarbital had typically been used to euthanize animals.

Duty was sentenced to death for strangling a fellow inmate at Oklahoma State Penitentiary in December 2001. At the time, he had been serving a life sentence for a 1978 conviction of rape, robbery and shooting with intent to kill. He did not contest the murder charge and vowed that he would kill again if he was not executed.

Duty later filed appeals that the change to the method of execution could be inhumane, but was denied. Though his case had gone all the way to the U.S. Supreme Court, opponents of capital punishment claimed that Duty had manipulated the system to be executed as a method of escape from life imprisonment. He was put to death at the same penitentiary where he had committed the murder nearly nine years earlier.

== Background ==
John David Duty was born on April 25, 1952, to Charles Houston Duty and Mildred Duty Hall. Duty said that he had been raised in a broken home, his mother having remarried twice. His family included two brothers, a sister, a half-brother and a half-sister. For some time, Duty went by the name of John David Hall; there had been some confusion over the identity of his biological father as his mother had married O.H. Hall at Atoka, Oklahoma, in 1950, but his birth certificate listed Duty as his surname. According to Duty, he lost an eye due to an accident in the third grade and suffered a head injury from a collapsed brick wall; the latter incident led him to be hospitalized for scarlet fever. Duty's mother died from an illness in Altus, Oklahoma, at the age of 46 on August 24, 1973.

Duty worked as a manager at Central Manufacturing in Vernon, Texas, before being employed at Sonic Drive-In and PepsiCo in Wichita Falls, Texas, which lies south of the border with Oklahoma. He and his wife Pam had two sons and a daughter.

== Kidnapping case ==
Map of Duty's travel sites after the February 1978 kidnapping.

On February 16, 1978, Duty and Anthony Trombitas, whom he had met about four to five days earlier, robbed the Jiffy Mart convenience store on Falcon Road in Altus, north of the border with Texas. During the robbery, which netted some beer and money, ranging in various accounts from $7.66 to $18, the two men abducted store clerk Linda Hall (no relation). After driving her to a barn in Tillman County, Duty raped Hall and shot her in the back of the head three times with a .22 caliber pistol. Trombitas then hit her with a stick, which Duty identified as a broom handle. Though left for dead, Hall was able to walk a mile (1.6 km) to a house for help and recovered at Tillman County Memorial Hospital. The two men drove off to Frederick, then Electra, and proceeded to Fort Worth. Upon hearing a radio report about her on the next day, Duty said, "I was surprised that she was still alive." Duty returned to Altus the following month, presuming that law enforcement officers were going to catch up with him anyway. He was arrested on the street after calling the police and hanging up from a payphone at another Jiffy Mart near the downtown square.

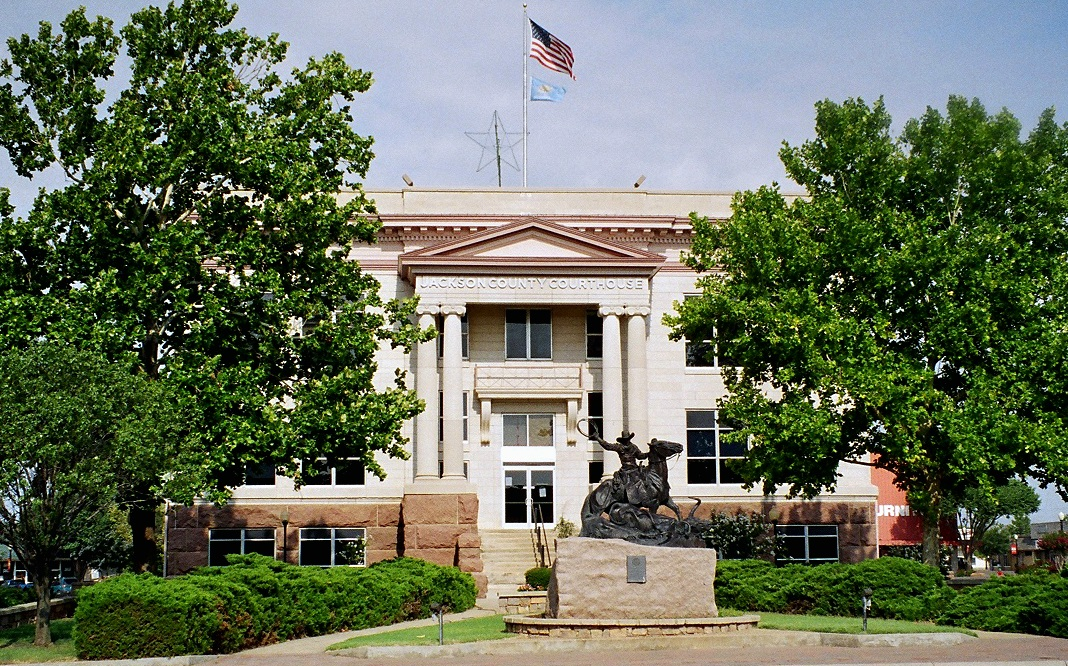
Jackson County Courthouse

In July 1978, Duty, represented by Clyde Amyx and John Wampler, was placed on trial in the Jackson County Courthouse before Judge Weldon Ferris. Duty stated that he had no criminal record besides three traffic violations, and that he felt that he could be rehabilitated in prison. He pleaded guilty on July 18 to charges of rape and shooting with intent to kill in Tillman County and was also convicted of robbery in neighboring Jackson County. Under cross-examination by prosecutor Mike Evans, Duty stated that he had been depressed and had been drinking for two days before the crime, which he admitted was his idea. Judge Ferris sentenced Duty to serve concurrent life terms for the charges of robbery, rape and shooting with intent to kill, and 20 years for kidnapping. Trombitas was sentenced to 25 years for armed robbery and 20 years for kidnapping.

== Hostage incident ==
At 11:30 am on August 8, 1979, Duty grabbed a pair of scissors and held eight people hostage in the medical unit of Oklahoma State Penitentiary in McAlester, Oklahoma. Officials did not know what prompted Duty, who had entered the unit for treatment, to take hostages as he did not make any demands. Duty soon released six of the hostages unharmed, and let nurse Virginia Nelson go about two hours later. The last remaining hostage, psychologist Jim Fenwick, took Duty into his office and conducted negotiations until Duty surrendered at 4:02 pm on the same day.

== Prison murder ==
On December 13, 2001, officials at the penitentiary placed 22-year-old Curtis J. Wise Jr. in the same cell with Duty. Wise had been convicted in October 1999 of burglary, larceny and contributing to the delinquency of a minor.

On December 19, Duty offered Wise some cigarettes in exchange for allowing himself to be tied up to make the guards think that he had been taken hostage, with the goal of having Duty transferred into administrative security. The prosecutor's report stated that after tying Wise's hands and feet behind his back, Duty strangled him to death with a shoelace. Duty then wrote a letter to Wise's mother, Mary, in which he wrote, "Well by the time you get this letter you will already know that your son is dead. I know now because I just killed him an hour ago. Gee you'd think I'd be feeling some remorse but I'm not." The letter was intercepted at the prison.

== Murder trial ==
I do it only for a death sentence. I'm never getting out of here with the time I'm doing. And with all my bad behavior in here I'm never going to make parole. So there's no time you can give me that would harm me in the least way. And because of my violent record you can't say I don't deserve the death penalty. I've killed another inmate, taken hostages 3 times, and assaulted a guard. Plus other various things to[o] numerous to mention.

— John David Duty, December 2001

At his arraignment at the District Court of Pittsburg County on June 4, 2002, Duty asked Judge Steven Taylor to enter a guilty plea to the murder and requested the death penalty, against the advice of his defense counsel. On October 28 of that year, Duty was deemed competent to enter the plea after court-ordered evaluations by the Carl Albert Community Mental Health Center and Eastern Oklahoma State Hospital. While testifying on his own behalf, Duty declined to present any mitigating evidence and said that he preferred death over spending a life sentence in lockdown 23 hours day. He also wrote to the prosecutor that he would kill again. Mary Wise pleaded to the court to sentence Duty to life in prison without the possibility of parole, stating: "I don't believe he ought to have a choice. I think he ought to sit in that cell and face those four walls and think about what he did for the rest of his natural-born life. And I hope and pray to God that you live to be 110 years old, because that's how long I want you to think about what you did." Judge Taylor denied her request, calling Duty a "textbook case for the death penalty". Duty was initially scheduled to be executed on February 24, 2005.

== Appeals ==
In 2004, Duty filed an appeal with the Oklahoma Court of Criminal Appeals. He cited the U.S. Supreme Court decision of Ring v. Arizona, arguing against the constitutionality of his "continuing threat" being used as an aggravating circumstance for his death sentence. However, the court noted that the issue was not raised by Duty during trial and upheld his judgement on April 23, 2004.

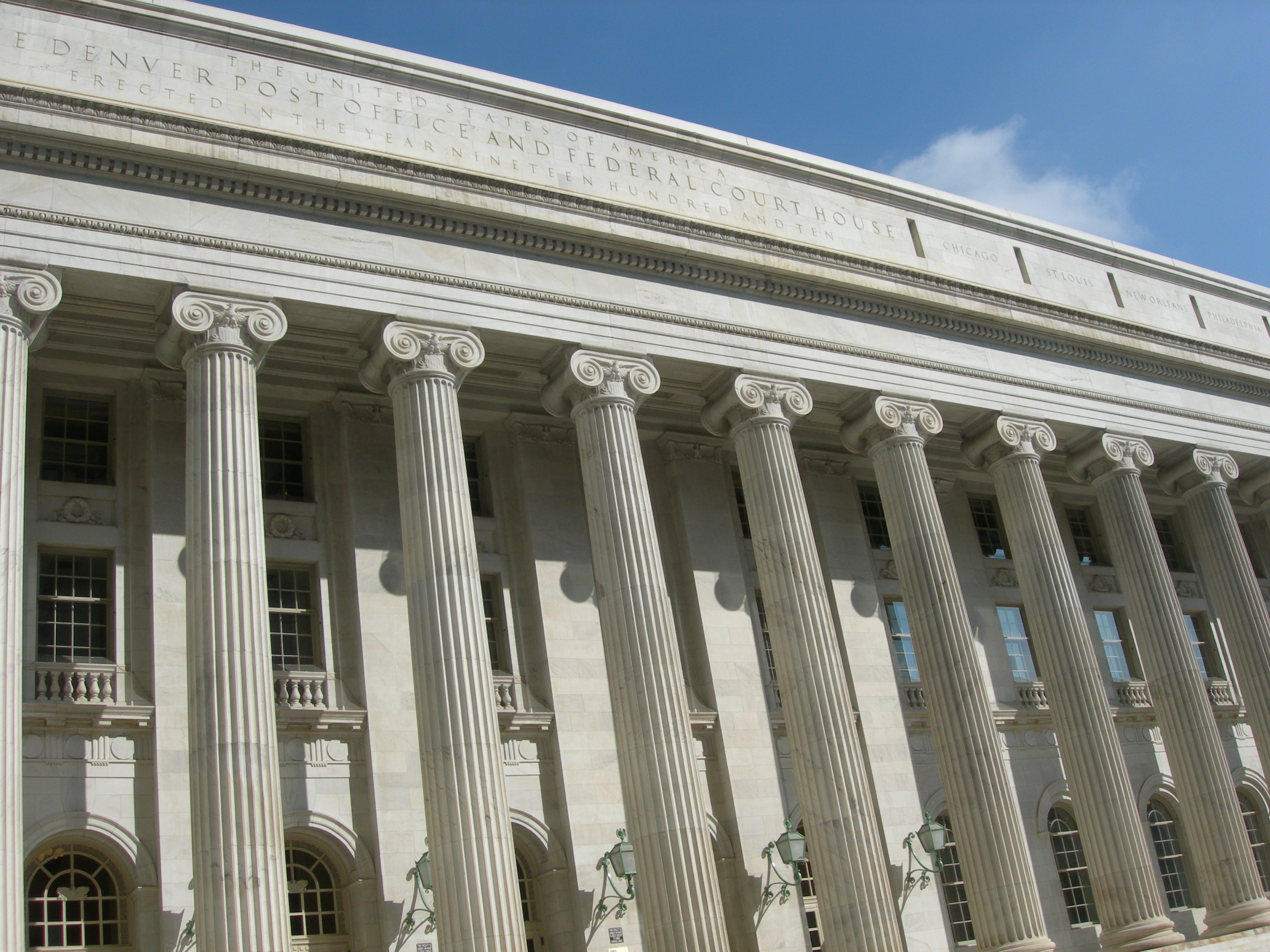
A panel of the United States Court of Appeals for the Tenth Circuit unanimously upheld the use of pentobarbital for lethal injections.

In 2010, a nationwide shortage of the lethal injection drug, sodium thiopental, led the Oklahoma Department of Corrections to instead consider pentobarbital, which is commonly used for animal euthanasia. Oklahoma state law is not specific in prescribing the use of a fast-acting barbiturate, allowing flexibility for such a substitution. Duty and two other inmates on death row filed a federal appeal that the new protocol would constitute cruel and unusual punishment. In a hearing before the Tenth Circuit Court of Appeals, the professor of anesthesia from Harvard Medical School testified for the defense that pentobarbital might not succeed in preventing "severe, excruciating pain". However, the professor of anesthesiology at the University of Massachusetts Amherst countered in a deposition for the state that 5 grams of pentobarbital would be sufficient to cause unconsciousness and death in minutes. Representatives from the Oklahoma Department of Corrections and the Death Penalty Information Center both testified that no other state had used pentobarbital and that they believed Duty would be the first person to be executed by the drug. On December 14, 2010, the Circuit Judges Jerome Holmes and Neil Gorsuch joined Chief Judge Mary Beck Briscoe in a unanimous decision upholding the use of the drug, citing that the state witness had demonstrated "substantially more clinical experience with the use of pentobarbital". A petition for certiorari to the Supreme Court of the United States over the constitutionality of the state's execution protocol was also denied.

== Execution ==
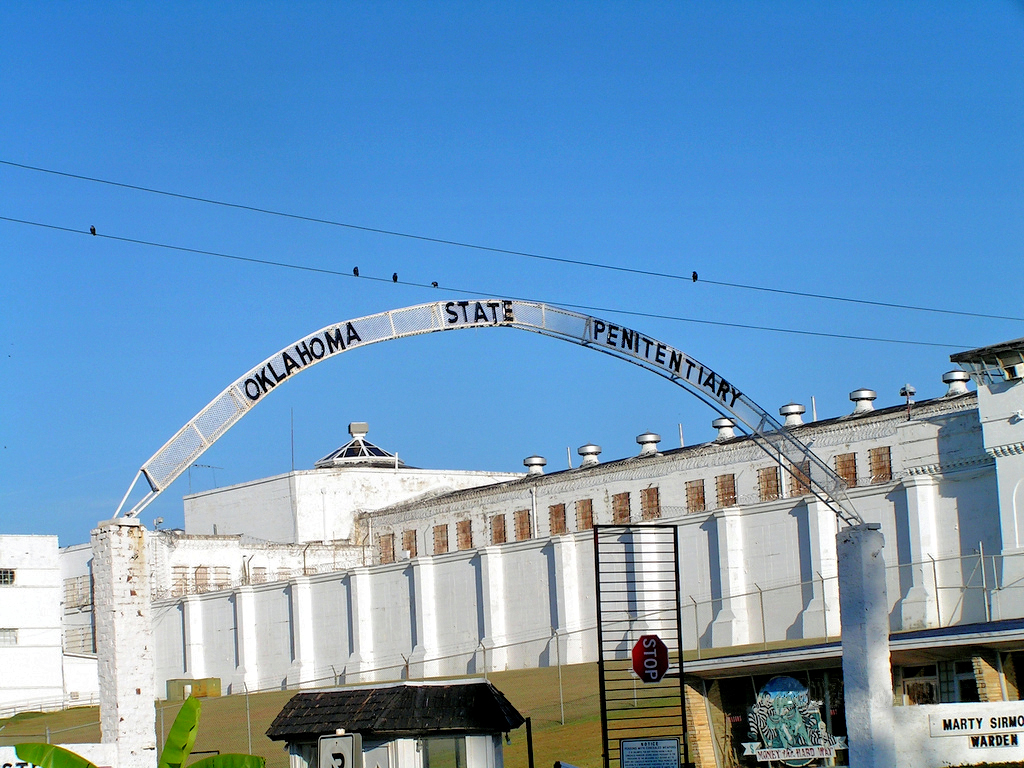
Duty was executed at Oklahoma State Penitentiary, where he had previously strangled fellow inmate Curtis Wise.

Duty's execution was carried out on December 16, 2010, at Oklahoma State Penitentiary. At noon, Duty was granted his last meal request, which included a double cheeseburger with mayonnaise, a foot-long hot dog with cheese, mustard and onions, a cherry limeade, and a banana shake. He then met with a prison chaplain, his attorneys, and his family. Duty addressed the family of the victim in his final statement, "I hope one day you'll be able to forgive me, not for my sake, but for your own. Thank you, Lord Jesus. I'm ready to go home." Witnesses included media, Duty's legal team, and his brother and sister-in-law; the Wise family did not attend.

Duty was strapped to a gurney with a patch over his right eye when the drugs were administered at 6:12 p.m.; a second intravenous line was prepared as a backup. The injection protocol included pentobarbital for sedation, followed by vecuronium bromide to paralyze his breathing, and finally potassium chloride to stop the heart. Duty repeated, "Thank you Lord, Thank you Lord" while he lost consciousness. He appeared to stop breathing 3 minutes later and was pronounced dead at 6:18 p.m. Duty was the last prisoner to be executed in the United States in 2010. He was survived by his two sons, a daughter, and several grandchildren.

=== Death penalty debate ===
The National Coalition to Abolish the Death Penalty used Duty's case to argue that capital punishment had actually set a dangerous precedent of encouraging a murder, rather than deterring it. Though the group never questioned Duty's guilt, they cited his premeditation in killing Wise, followed by his guilty plea and request for the death penalty, as an example of exploiting the system to effectively turn the state into "an agent of suicide".

== See also ==
- Capital punishment in Oklahoma
- List of people executed in Oklahoma
- List of people executed in the United States in 2010
