= Harry M. Wegeforth =

American physician

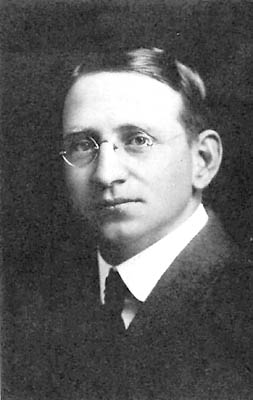
- Born: Harry Milton Wegefarth; January 7, 1882; Baltimore, Maryland, US
- Died: June 25, 1941 (aged 59); San Diego, California, US
- Monuments: Wegeforth Bowl; Wegeforth Elementary
- Education: Baltimore Medical College; Johns Hopkins University
- Occupation: Physician
- Known for: Founded the Zoological Society of San Diego and San Diego Zoo
- Title: President of the Zoological Society of San Diego
- Term: 1916–24
- Successor: Wesley C. Crandall
- Spouse: Rachel Granger (1913–41; his death)
- Parents: Conrad Wegefarth; Mary Elizabeth MacArthur

Harry Milton Wegeforth (born Harry Milton Wegefarth, January 7, 1882 – June 25, 1941) was an American physician who founded the Zoological Society of San Diego and the San Diego Zoo. As a doctor he operated a thriving practice in San Diego, served briefly as president of the City Board of Health and as a surgeon for the San Diego and Arizona Railway, and established a hospital and clinic in the city's downtown district. He is best known, however, for founding the Zoological Society, which grew out of his involvement with the Panama–California Exposition in 1916, and for being the driving force behind the creation and early growth of the zoo.

As president of the Zoological Society from its inception in 1916 until his death in 1941, Wegeforth planned much of the zoo's layout and many of its early exhibits. He convinced several wealthy San Diegans to contribute to the zoo's construction and development, and campaigned for ballot measures to secure its lands and finances. He networked and traded animals with many other zoos across the country, creating the National Association of Zoological Executives which later evolved into the Association of Zoos and Aquariums. After a heart attack in 1931 forced him to abandon his medical practice, he spent his remaining years traveling the world, collecting and trading animals for the zoo. An amphitheatre at the zoo and an elementary school and day care facility in San Diego's Serra Mesa community are named in his honor.

== Early life ==
Harry Wegefarth was born in Baltimore, one of seven children born to Conrad Wegefarth—a German immigrant and oil prospector for whom Wegefarth County, Texas was named—and his third wife, Mary Elizabeth MacArthur, who was of Scotch-Irish descent. Harry had twelve siblings: Brothers Arthur, George, Paul, and Charles; sisters Emma and Ellen; and six older half-brothers from his father's previous marriages. Harry showed an interest in animals from childhood, reading books on their habits and characteristics, playing at circus using toy ones, searching for crabs in Chesapeake Bay, and hunting for snakes in nearby woods and then selling them to neighbors. He became interested in tightrope walking after observing circus performers, and at age twelve began practicing with them at their winter quarters nearby. After his second winter of practice he went out on tour with them as part of their act, but was brought home by his elder brother Charles. Charles drowned while Harry was still a boy, instilling in him an aversion to swimming; Harry never swam, and urged family members against it.

== Education ==
Following his older brothers into the study of medicine, Wegefarth earned a position with the Baltimore Health Department at age fifteen. After contracting influenza during a snowstorm, he diagnosed himself with acute tuberculosis and, on the advice of one of his brothers, moved to Colorado for his respiratory health at age sixteen. There he worked as a cowboy for almost four years, herding Texas Longhorns while completing his high school education via correspondence course. Having recovered from his tuberculosis, he returned to Baltimore and enrolled at Baltimore Medical College, supporting himself by working in drug stores and teaching anatomy during the winters, and working on a sister-in-law's farm in the summers. He earned his Doctor of Medicine degree in May 1906, and took postgraduate training at Johns Hopkins University, specializing in surgery. He took a position as assistant bacteriologist for the city of Baltimore, and then became first surgeon of the Baltimore Northeastern Dispensary.

== Career ==
=== 1908–15: Establishing a medical practice ===
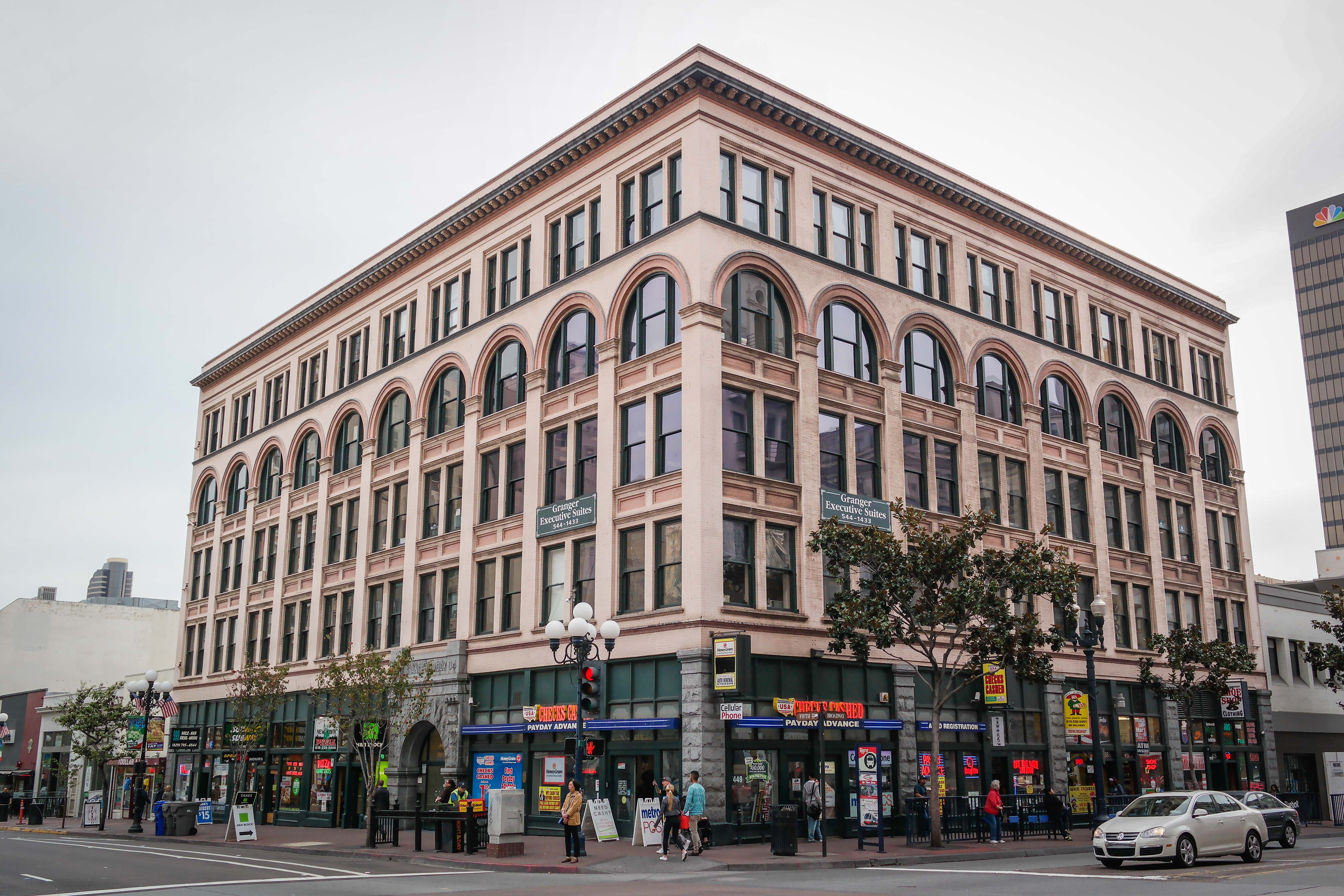
Wegforth's medical offices were in the Granger Building (pictured in 2014), owned by millionaire Ralph Granger. Wegeforth married Granger's daughter Rachel in 1913, and sheltered animals in the building's basement in the early days of the San Diego Zoo.

Wegefarth left Baltimore in 1908, heading west in search of a place in which to open his own medical practice. He stopped off in Jamestown, North Dakota, but found the weather too cold and continued on to Seattle, then south, arriving in San Diego. Passing the California State Board of Medicine examinations, he borrowed $50 and opened offices in downtown San Diego in the Granger Building at the southwest corner of D Street (now Broadway) and Fifth Avenue in 1910. Ralph Granger, the building's owner, had become a millionaire by staking two German miners who discovered the "Last Chance" silver mine near Creede, Colorado in 1890; moving to San Diego in 1892, he bought and became vice president of the Merchants National Bank and built the Granger Building, with the bank occupying the ground floor. Wegefarth married Granger's daughter Rachel on November 14, 1913; he was 31 years old, she 20. Around this time Harry changed the spelling of his family name to Wegeforth.^{[I]}

During his first few months in San Diego, Wegeforth was often called upon by Sheriff Fred M. Jennings to treat prisoners at the county jail (Jennings' daughter, Belle Benchley, would later work under Wegeforth as Executive Secretary of the San Diego Zoo). He became interested in orthopedic surgery, and studied specialized techniques at medical centers in Baltimore and New York. Wegeforth's sister Emma soon moved to San Diego and became his housekeeper and medical secretary. In 1912 he was appointed president of the City Board of Health and launched drives to improve the quality of the city's food by advocating for purification of milk and foodstuffs, bacteria tests for food suppliers, and publication of names of suppliers who did not meet these standards. Feeling that mayor James E. Wadham and the San Diego City Council did not back these attempted reforms, he criticized them in newspapers and was promptly fired. His efforts were lauded in a San Diego Sun editorial, which said "He has worked hard and long and courageously against that old-fossilized regime which has done little or nothing to stop unclean meat, poor milk, and carelessly kept foodstuffs, along with a suspicion of petty graft among the subordinates of the city service ... If what Dr. Wegeforth has been doing is 'incompetence', as charged, then what the city seems to need is some more of the same kind of incompetence."

As his medical practice expanded, Wegeforth became known as a diagnostician. In 1915 his brothers Paul and Arthur also moved to San Diego; Paul, a brain surgeon, joined Harry's practice, while Arthur served as head of the San Diego Hospital-Clinic until his death in 1939.

=== 1916–22: Founding the Zoological Society of San Diego and San Diego Zoo ===
It took ordinary persistence, and the organization of teamwork among others. I tried never to lose heart. Whenever anybody started to knock my plans, I just kept right on boosting them. The idea of failure never entered my mind. Of course it was hard at first, but when they saw I was really making good, that I meant business and San Diego was going to have a high class zoo, they came through nobly.

— Harry Wegeforth

In 1916 Harry and Paul Wegeforth served as surgeons for the second year of the Panama–California Exposition held in Balboa Park. Harry also served on the Exposition's board of directors, and had the idea to start a zoo using exotic animal exhibits that would be left over following the Exhibition's closure. By his own account, his inspiration came on September 16, 1916, as he and Paul were driving down Sixth Avenue on their way back to their office after performing an operation at the St. Joseph Hospital. Hearing the roaring of lions from one of the Exposition's exhibits, Harry remarked to his brother "Wouldn't it be splendid if San Diego had a zoo! You know ... I think I'll start one." Paul offered to help, but did not think the project would gain much support since the Exposition was not as successful as it had been the prior year. In an article in the San Diego Union, the brothers announced a call for interested parties to join them in forming a zoological society to develop and support a zoological garden. Joined by naturalist Frank Stephens and doctors Fred Baker and Joseph Cheesman Thompson, they held the first organizational meeting of the Zoological Society of San Diego on October 2, 1916 in the Wegeforths' offices; Harry served as the founding president, Paul as secretary. The Articles of Incorporation and by-laws for the Society were executed on December 11, 1916.

The San Diego Zoo began as a long row of cages along Park Boulevard, described by Wegeforth as "little more than Menagerie Row", featuring lions, bears, ducks, lynxes, golden eagles, rails, a badger, a gray fox, a coyote, a whip snake, a white goose, and groups of buffalo, deer, and elk. Most of these animals had been rented for the Exhibition from a menagerie at the Wonderland Amusement Park in nearby Ocean Beach, which had since gone out of business; others were scattered in various exhibits throughout Balboa Park and turned over to the fledgling zoo by the Park Department, while some were donated to the Society or acquired through trade. To feed the collection, Wegeforth himself went along the San Diego waterfront asking fishermen to donate fish, traveled to outlying ranches to convince farmers to donate hay, and collected second-grade fruits and vegetables from produce markets.

Upon American entry into World War I in mid-1917, Paul Wegeforth resigned from the Zoological Society's Board of Directors to accept a commission in the United States Army. Harry also volunteered for military service but was rejected for medical reasons, having had an appendectomy in October 1916. The Society faced financial challenges in maintaining its growing animal collection and had run out of funds by October 1917, so Wegeforth organized a track and field meet between the Navy and Marine Corps, generating enough revenue from ticket sales to maintain the Society through the end of the year. Negotiating with the Balboa Park Commission for a permanent location for the zoo, in 1918 he agreed to an arrangement in which the City of San Diego would legally own all of the zoo's animals, equipment, and property, but the Zoological Society would have exclusive jurisdiction over and management of them. Reapplying to the Army Medical Corps, Wegeforth was commissioned as a captain in July 1918 and assigned to the Neuro-Surgical Institute of New York for training. He resigned from the Zoological Society's Board of Directors and was replaced as president by Joseph Sefton, Jr. However, the Armistice of 11 November 1918 was signed before he was transported overseas, and in January 1919 he returned to San Diego to resume his medical practice and his position as president of the Society. Upon his return he began constructing reptile cages and started trading with and selling animals to other zoos, exchanging two brown bear cubs for a polar bear.

Wegeforth initially asked the city council for almost ten percent of Balboa Park's 1,200-acres (490 ha) for the zoo, but was rebuffed by parties who believed the acreage should be left as open parkland.

He studied the layouts and architecture of many other zoos, and rode his Arabian stallion through the hills and canyons of the zoo's new property planning its design and exhibits. Much of the planning was done in his medical offices, where he met with contractors, suppliers, and designers and went over blueprints and construction schedules.

Many local philanthropists responded to Wegeforth's urging and provided funding. He made collecting trips to other zoos and to many other countries, collecting animals personally rather than through dealers, often trading local species (such as rattlesnakes and sea lions) for exotic species (such as elephants and koalas).

=== 1923–41: Continued zoo work and founding of hospital-clinic ===
As the zoo grew, so did the demands of Wegeforth's medical practice. He spent many weekends and vacations at the zoo, and would also spend his lunch breaks there, dictating letters and conferring with the small staff.

His hands-on management of the zoo, combined with early financial problems, caused a frequent turnover in zoo directors. The most prominent was Frank Buck, who went to work as temporary director for the San Diego Zoo on June 13, 1923, signed to a three-year contract by Wegeforth. Dr. William T. Hornaday, director of the Bronx Zoo, had recommended Buck for the job. But Buck quickly clashed with the strong-willed Wegeforth and left the zoo after three months to return to animal collecting.

In 1927, after several other equally short-lived zoo directors, Wegeforth appointed the zoo's bookkeeper, Belle Benchley, to the top position in the zoo, that of executive secretary. He soon realized that she was functioning as the zoo's director so he gave her that title. For the next 15 years the two of them worked together to transform the zoo from a small collection of animals to an innovative, world-class zoo.

He and Neil Morgan co-wrote a history of the San Diego Zoo called It Began With a ROAR!

Wegeforth continued to serve as president and chief promoter of the zoo until he died of a heart attack in his home on June 25, 1941

== Other civic activities ==
In 1926 he was a key mover in the decision to purchase and bring to San Diego the sailing ship Star of India, now a museum ship in San Diego Bay.

== Personal life ==
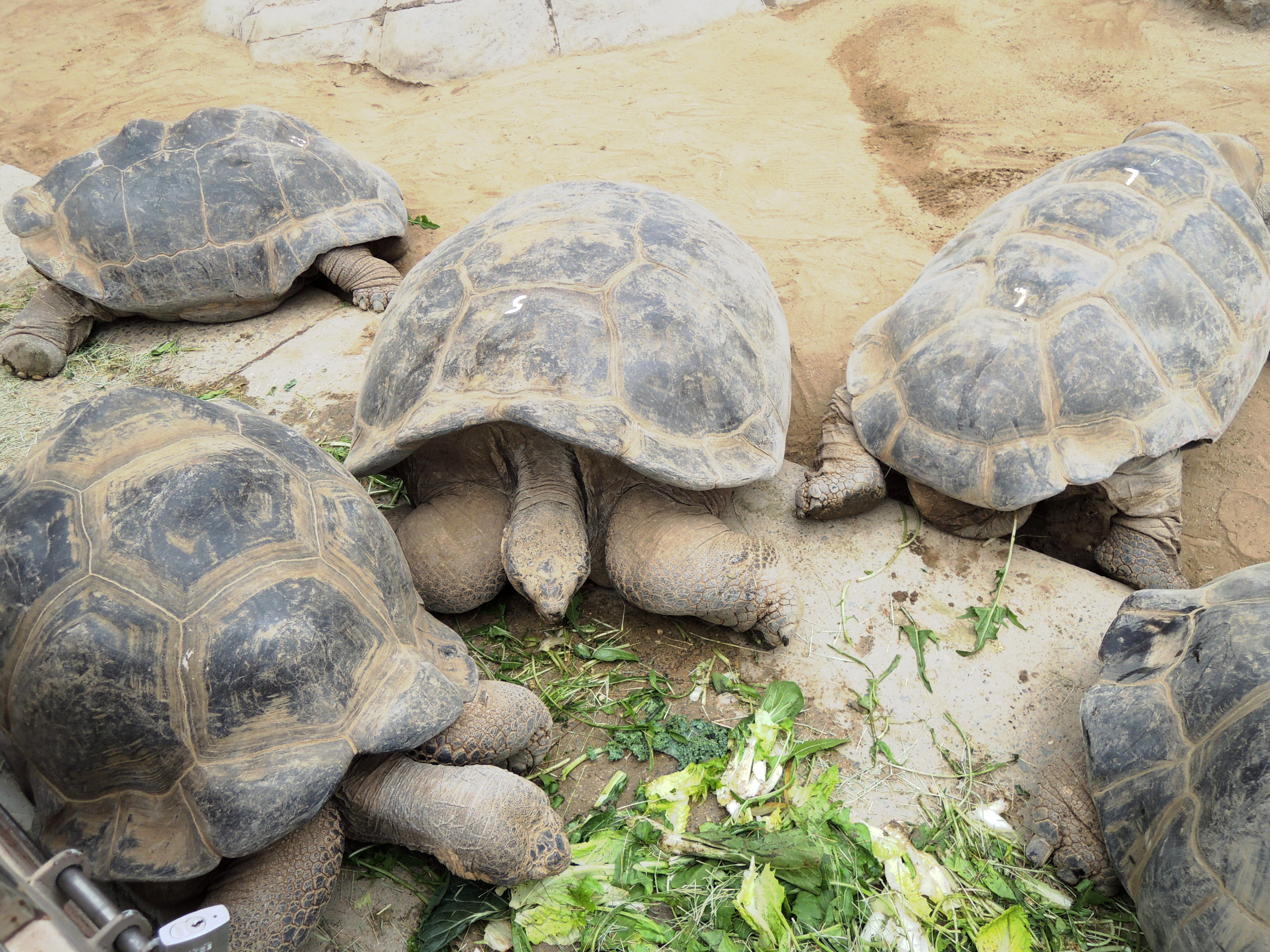
Galápagos tortoise at the San Diego Zoo in 2013. Wegeforth had a fondness for turtles and tortoises, and traded for them frequently to build up a large collection for the zoo.

Wegeforth married Rachel Granger, daughter of millionaire Ralph Granger, in 1913. Their wedding, which was attended by actresses Norma, Natalie, and Constance Talmadge, took place at a new house in the city's Burlingame neighborhood, where the couple lived for a year. The house, designed for them by architect William Henry Wheeler in the American Foursquare style, is now designated as a Historical Landmark by the City of San Diego. They later lived in a larger home in the Marston Hills neighborhood. They had two sons, Lester and Milton. Wegeforth lived in the Wegeforth House at 210 Maple Street in the Banker's Hill neighborhood of San Diego. The house was commissioned by Wegeforth's father-in-law Ralph Granger in 1916 for daughter Rachel and son-in-law Harry. Constructed in 1916 under the skilled guidance of architect Louis Gill from Gill & Gill. This distinguished house holds a profound connection to the rich history of San Diego and proudly designated as the “San Diego Historic Landmark No. 156”. In the 1980s, the house was purchased by the San Diego Junior Women's League as their headquarters. See https://sandiego.jl.org/thewegeforthhouse/house-history/

Wegeforth enjoyed cars; he bought a new Overland Automobile around the time of his marriage, and in 1923 went into debt to buy an eight-cylinder, fully equipped Packard which he paid to have repainted fire engine red, then traded in within a year. A fan of music, he often researched details on the latest phonographs and record changers. His hobbies included building radios, shooting, and photography; he created a large collection of color slides documenting the zoo and his worldwide travels. He was a 32nd-degree Mason, and joined many San Diego social and country clubs. For sport he enjoyed football and baseball and was an active horseback rider. His favorite author was Rudyard Kipling, and his favorite novel was Kim.

Of the many animals he helped acquire for the zoo, he had a particular passion for turtles and tortoises. He traded for them at many zoos during his travels in order to build up a large collection at the San Diego Zoo, and decorated his office with many likenesses of them. On one occasion he complained to a visiting New York zoo official that the man had not sent him any turtles; after spending a few minutes in the zoo, the visitor returned to Wegeforth exclaiming that the zoo had some 48 turtle basins, and probably the largest collection of turtles in the world.

== Legacy ==
No one person gave so much of his personal energy, interest, devotion, and very life to the development of a public project as Doctor Harry gave to the creation of the Zoo. Certainly no benefactor was more self-effacing.

— Tom Faulconer, San Diego Zoo Director 1923–26

Notoriously self-effacing, Wegeforth took little credit for his role in creating the San Diego Zoo. He requested that journalists use the name of the Zoological Society rather than his own in articles about the zoo "so that it would become a society's function instead of an individual's", and preferred to give credit to the persons who worked on projects or who donated their labor or funds. In 1936 the zoo's amphitheatre was named the Wegeforth Bowl in his honor; at the unveiling of a commemorative plaque dedicated to him, Wegeforth expressed gratitude but told the assembled officials that the money for the plaque would have been better spent to buy an animal.

Harry M. Wegeforth Elementary School opened in San Diego in 1957. The site was dedicated on February 9, 1959 with Mrs. Harry Wegeforth and family in attendance.

== Gallery ==
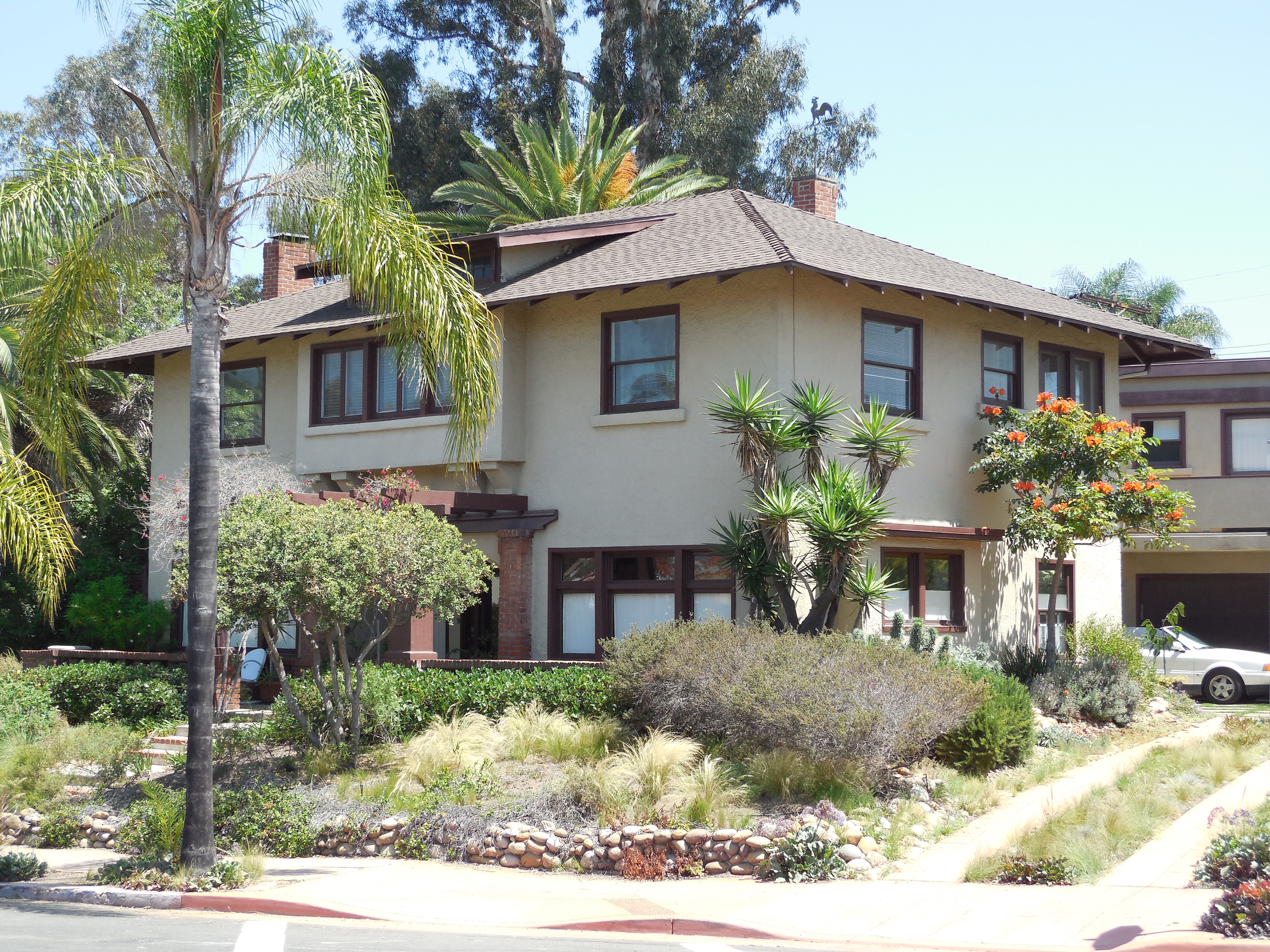
Wegeforth's house in the Burlingame neighborhood, now a historical site

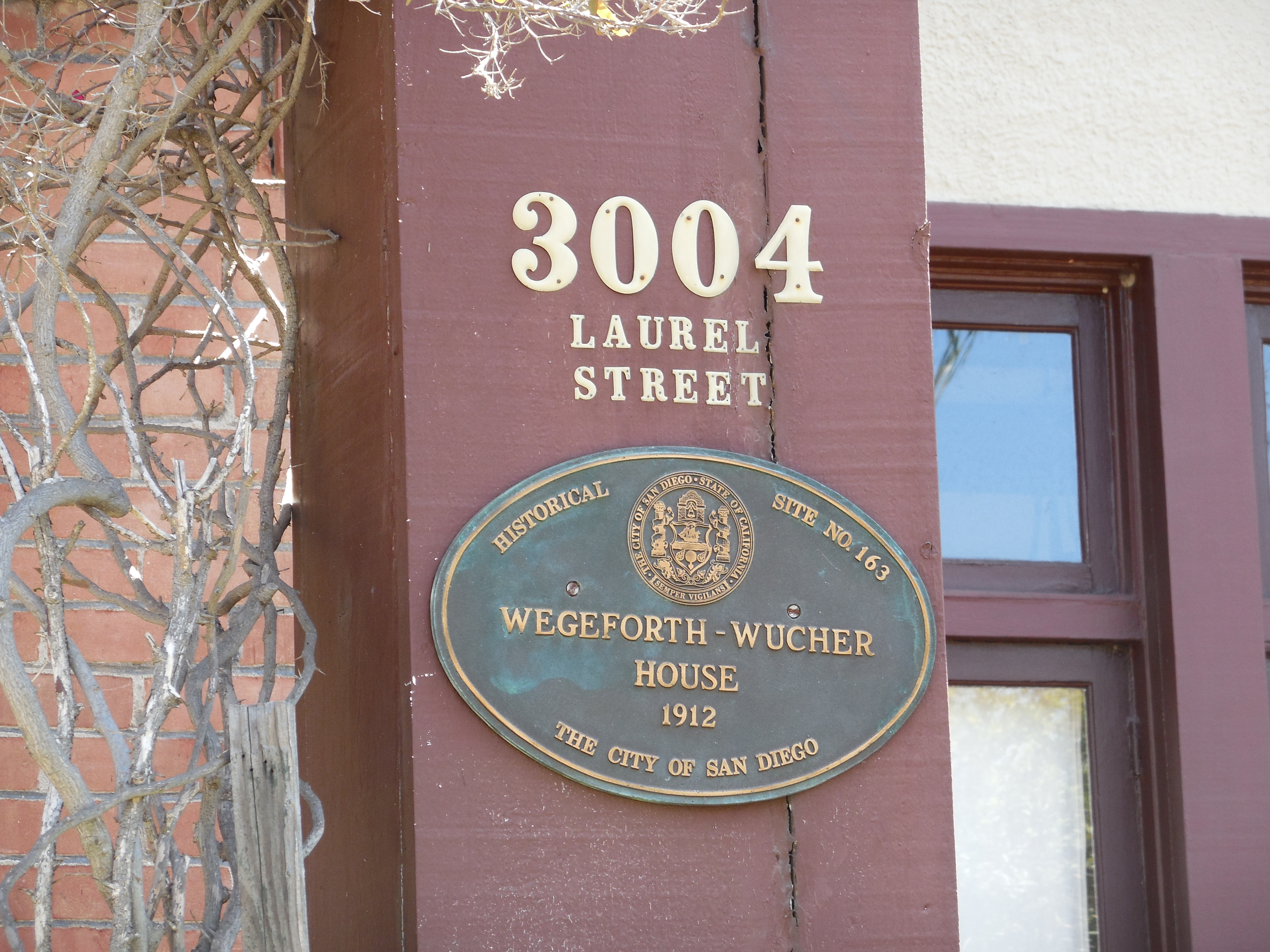
Plaque on the Wegeforth house designating it as City of San Diego Historical Site no. 163

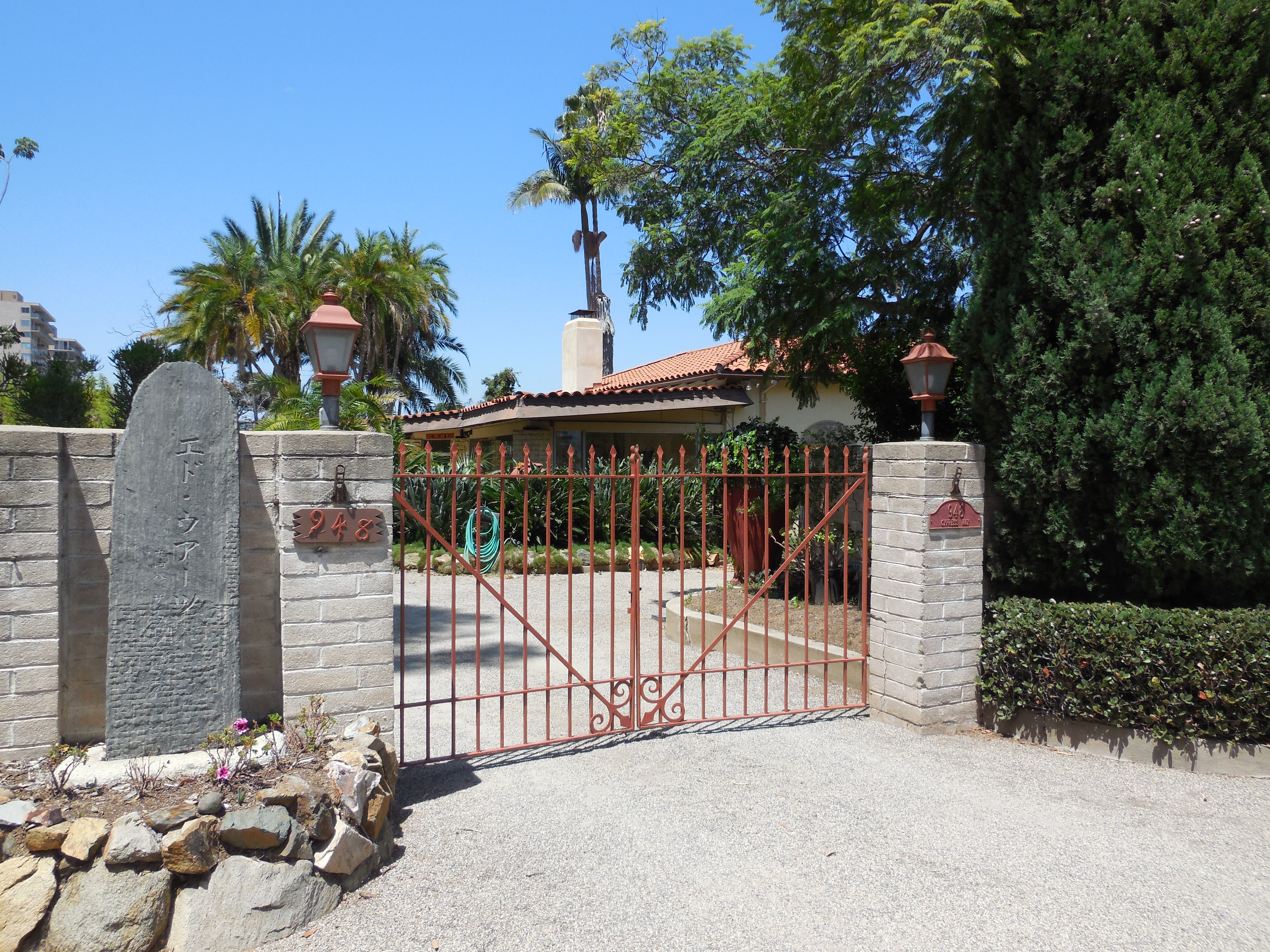
Wegeforth's later house in the Marston Hills neighborhood

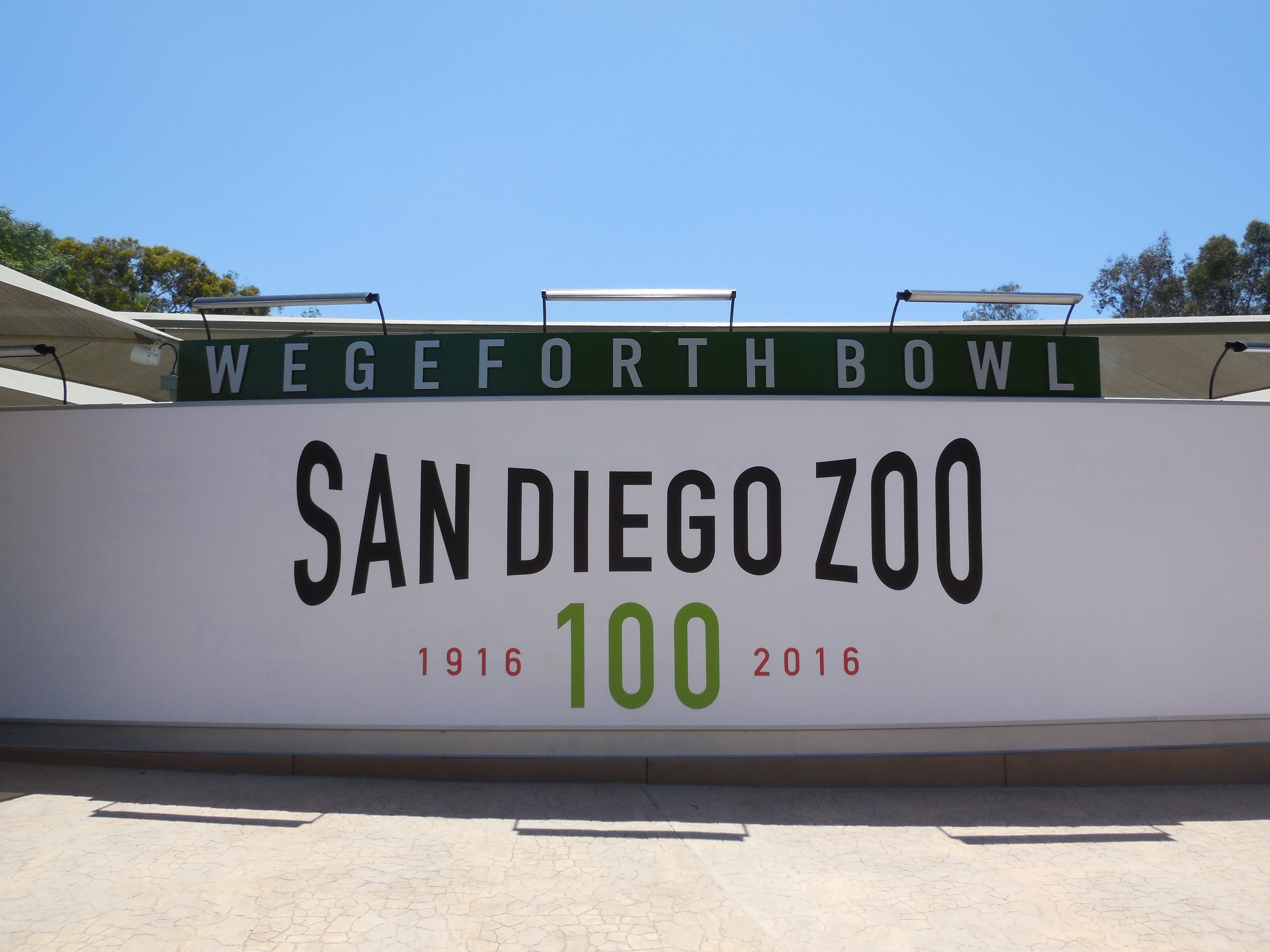
The Wegeforth Bowl at the San Diego Zoo, decorated for the zoo's centennial

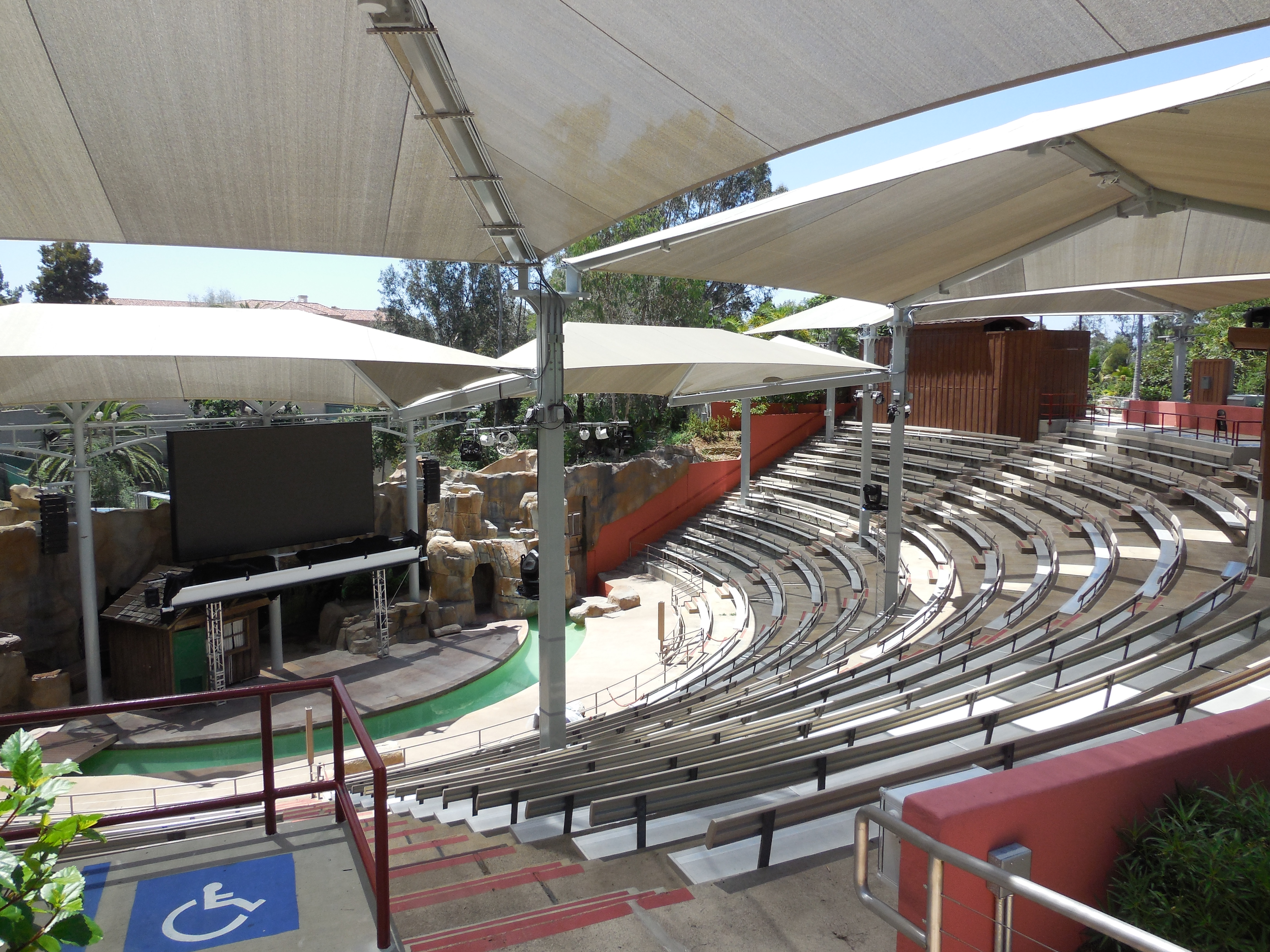
Interior of the Wegeforth Bowl in 2015

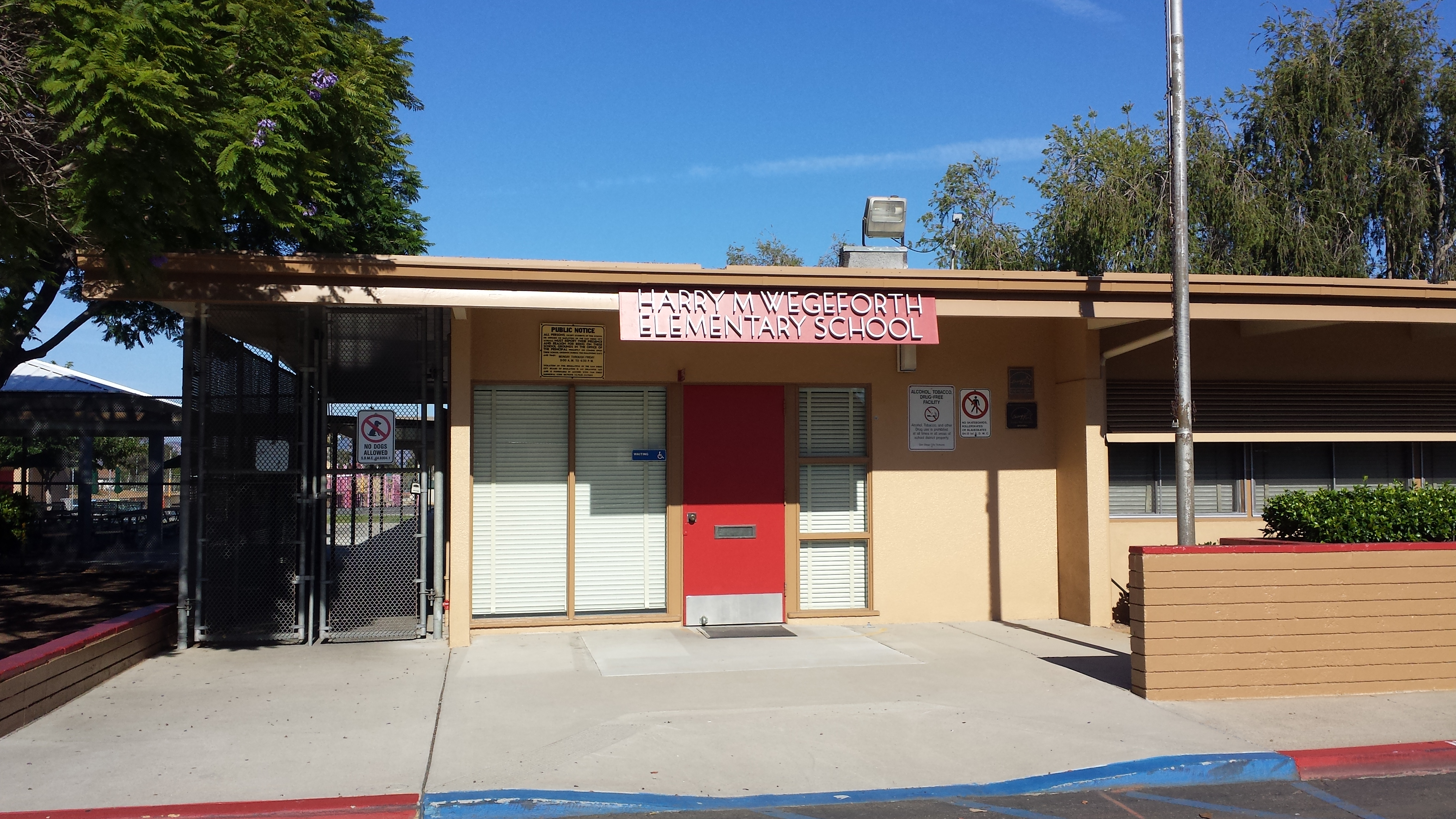
Harry M. Wegeforth Elementary School, in San Diego's Serra Mesa community

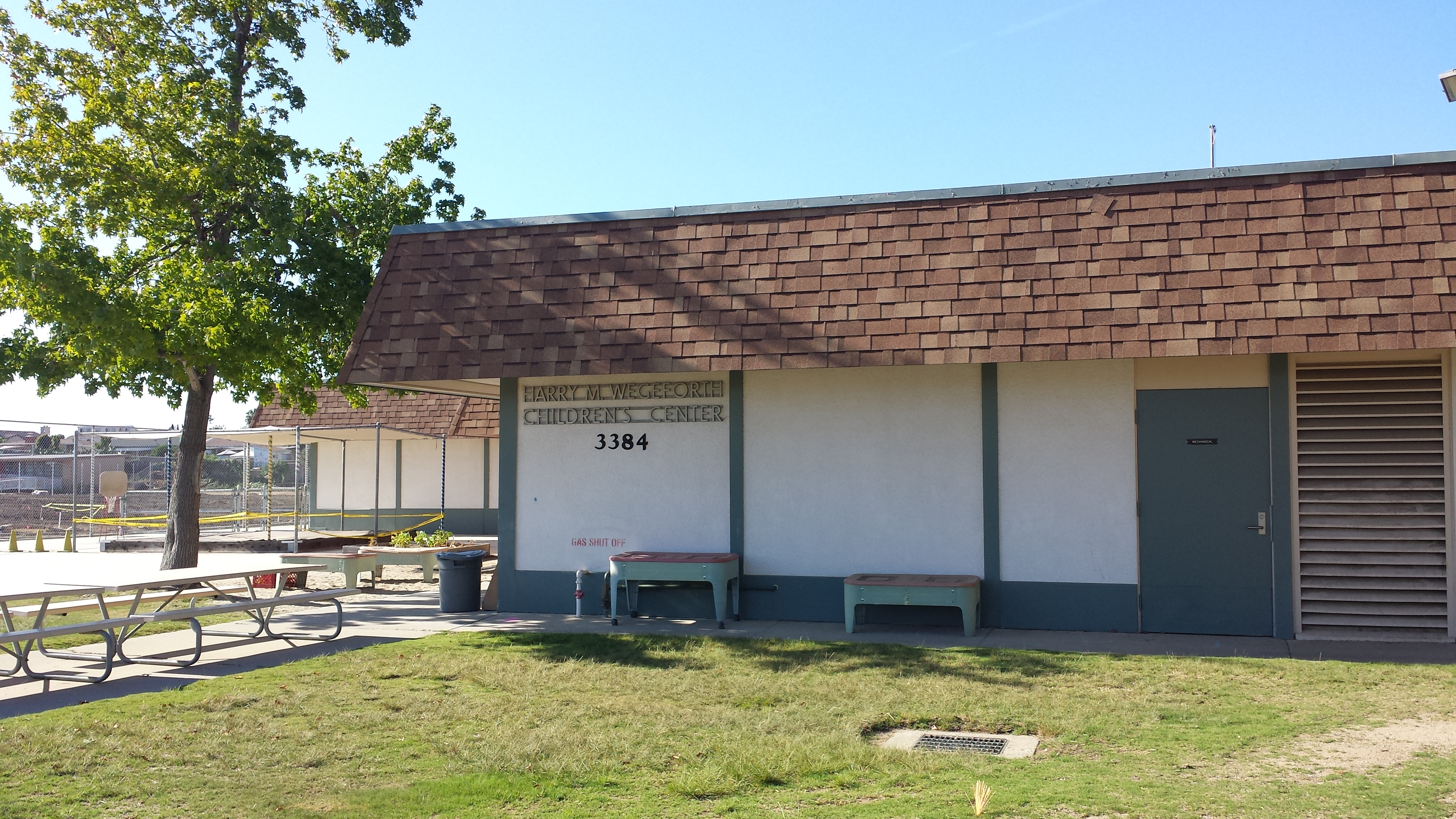
Harry M. Wegeforth Children's Center, a day care facility adjacent to Wegeforth Elementary

== Notes ==
I Biographer Neil Morgan does not give a date for the change of spelling, mentioning merely that it was Harry who made the change. The article placed by Harry and Paul in the San Diego Union in September 1916 gives the spelling as Wegeforth, but the California State Journal of Medicine for January of that year gives the spelling as Wegefarth, as does a directory of medical practitioners published by the Board of Medical Examiners of the State of California in March 1918.
