= Katherine Herring =

American baseball player (1933–2018)

Katie James
- Outfielder
- Born: July 11, 1933; Friendship, Oklahoma, U.S.
- Died: November 4, 2018 (aged 85); Tamaqua, Pennsylvania, U.S.
- Batted: Right Threw: Right

Teams
- Grand Rapids Chicks (1953)

Career highlights and awards
- Women in Baseball – AAGPBL Permanent Display at the Baseball Hall of Fame and Museum (since 1988)

Katherine "Katie" Herring (later James; July 11, 1933 – November 4, 2018) was an All-American Girls Professional Baseball League player. Listed at 5' 4", 118 Lb., Herring batted and threw right handed. She was dubbed Katie by her teammates.

== Biography ==
Herring was born in Friendship, Oklahoma, on July 11, 1933, the daughter of William D. and Beryl (Martin) Herring.

In 1952, Herring joined the All-American Girls Professional Baseball League, and was assigned to the Grand Rapids Chicks as an outfielder for the 1953 season.

In 1988, she was inaugurated a permanent display at the Baseball Hall of Fame and Museum at Cooperstown, New York, which honors those who were part of the All-American Girls Professional Baseball League.

Herring was married to Paul C. James Sr., who died on November 2, 2013. On November 4, 2018, she died in Tamaqua, Pennsylvania, and was survived by her two sons, three siblings, and three grandchildren.
