= Fullerton Dam =

- U.S. National Register of Historic Places
- Location within Oklahoma Location within the United States
- Nearest city: Olustee, Oklahoma
- Coordinates: 34°37′27″N 99°29′27″W
- Area: 0.3 acres (0.12 ha)
- Built: c. 1895
- Built by: Fullerton, William J.
- NRHP reference No.: 76001562
- Added to NRHP: November 7, 1976

The Fullerton Dam is a ruined dam located 7 miles (11 km) northwest of Olustee, in Jackson County, Oklahoma. Farmer William J. Fullerton built the dam across Turkey Creek in the mid-1890s to irrigate the vegetable crops on his 1,500 acres (610 ha) farm. As western Oklahoma was a dry region, farmers depended on a regular water supply to produce crops, making Fullerton's dam an important innovation. The dam was the first gravity flow dam built by a European settler in western Oklahoma, and Fullerton became a successful regional farmer due to his effective irrigation system. It is even more notable because Fullerton designed the system himself using a homemade transit, (Note: A transit, in this context, is an instrument resembling a theodolite, used by surveyors and engineers.) and the system was built using unskilled manual labor and mules.

The main irrigation channel was built of limestone blocks and was up to 50 feet (15 m) wide and up to 20 feet (6.1 m) deep. The channel ran 3 miles (4.8 km) to the east and 2 miles (3.2 km) to the south.

In addition, the reservoir which the dam created became a popular local attraction. However, Fullerton's farm began to fail around 1905 because of falling produce prices and increasing production expenses. Several land developers offered to buy him out but he refused the offers. He had to borrow a large amount of money to stay in business, and was heavily in debt when he died in 1916. His whole operation was sold to satisfy creditors. The dam broke permanently during a 1919 flood. The stone ruins remain at the site of the dam and are generally in the same condition as they were following the flood.

The site of the dam was added to the National Register of Historic Places on November 7, 1976.
