= Cross S Ranch Headquarters =

- U.S. National Register of Historic Places
- Location within Oklahoma Location within the United States
- Nearest city: Olustee, Oklahoma
- Coordinates: 34°29′5″N 99°26′11″W
- Area: 5 acres (2.0 ha)
- Built: 1891
- Architectural style: Stackhouse
- NRHP reference No.: 06000119
- Added to NRHP: March 8, 2006

The Cross S Ranch Headquarters is a historic building located in farmland 5 miles (8.0 km) south of Olustee, Oklahoma. The two-story stone building served as the headquarters of the Cross S Ranch, a cattle ranch founded in 1891. As a major cattle trail passed through the area, the ranch took advantage of the open land to raise free-range cattle. By 1902, the ranch had decreased in size due to homesteaders and raised horses rather than cattle. The ranch eventually became a wheat farm, reflecting a broader shift in Jackson County agricultural production. A larger wheat farm purchased the ranch in the 1970s, and the headquarters building is all that remains of the original property.

The building was added to the National Register of Historic Places on March 8, 2006.
