= Perryman Ranch Headquarters =

- U.S. National Register of Historic Places
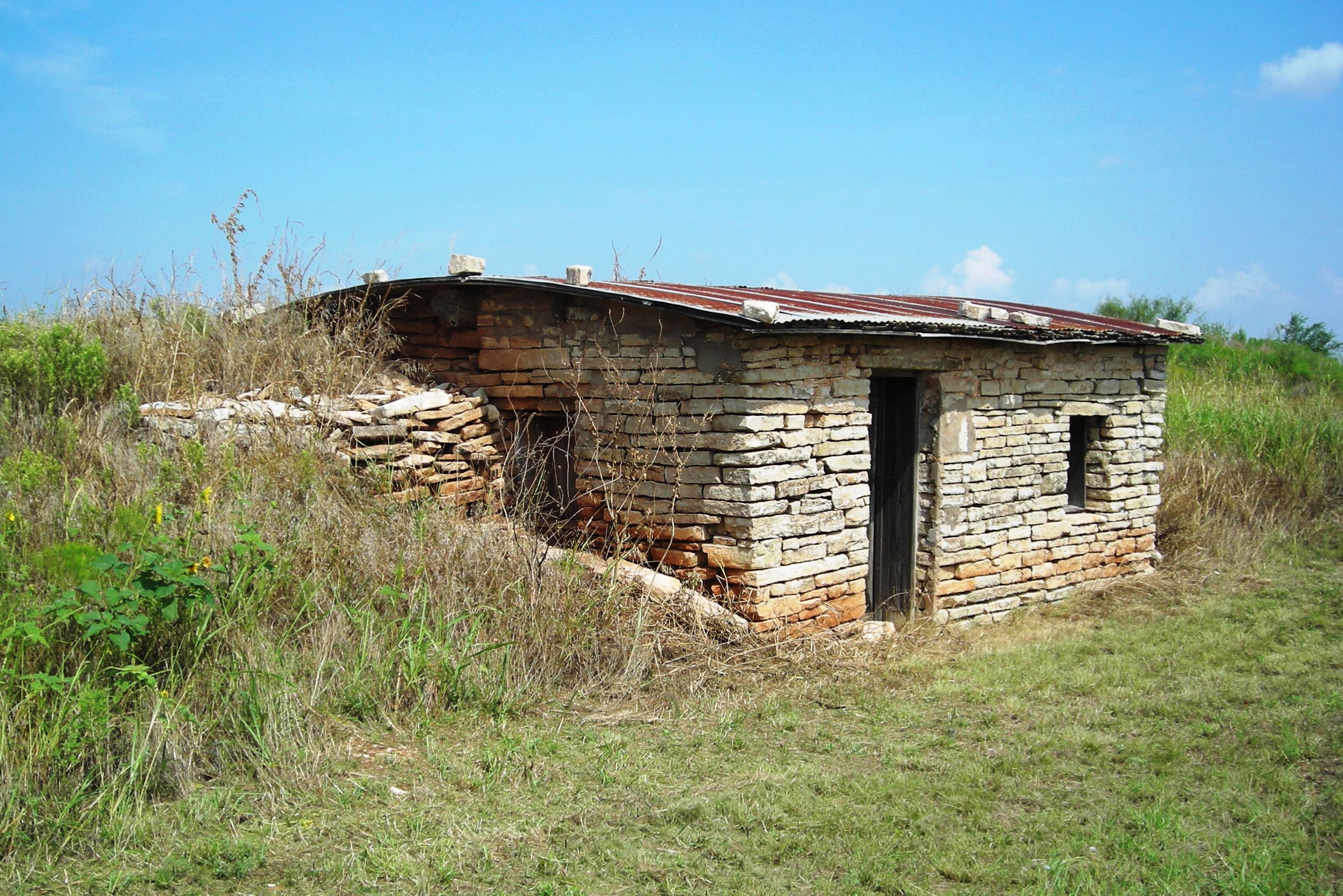

- Location within Oklahoma Location within the United States
- Location: 0.2 mi. E of jct. of Cty Rds. N193 and E159, Duke, Oklahoma
- Coordinates: 34°42′39″N 99°31′29″W
- Area: 5 acres (2.0 ha)
- Built: 1888
- Architectural style: Vernacular stone
- NRHP reference No.: 07000260
- Added to NRHP: April 4, 2007

The Perryman Ranch Headquarters is located in the current Jackson County, Oklahoma, north and east of the town of East Duke, Oklahoma. The headquarters is the location of an original dry-laid rock half-dugout and rock corral from the late 19th century

The Perryman Ranch Headquarters, as designated by the National Register of Historic Places and the Oklahoma Historical Society can be found at the listed location - Perryman Ranch Headquarters, .2 mile East of Jct. of County Roads #N193 & #E159, 4/4/07, A, C, D, 07000260.

Jackson County, Oklahoma was once a part of old Greer County, Texas, Greer County, Oklahoma Territory and now a part of the State of Oklahoma.

The Perryman Ranch Headquarters first served the Alonzo Perryman family starting in July 1888. Still owned by the grandson of Alonzo Perryman the homestead including the architectural establishments of the rock half-dugout and rock corral are a testament to a family that endured through tough times on the plains of Texas/Oklahoma and the Dust Bowl.

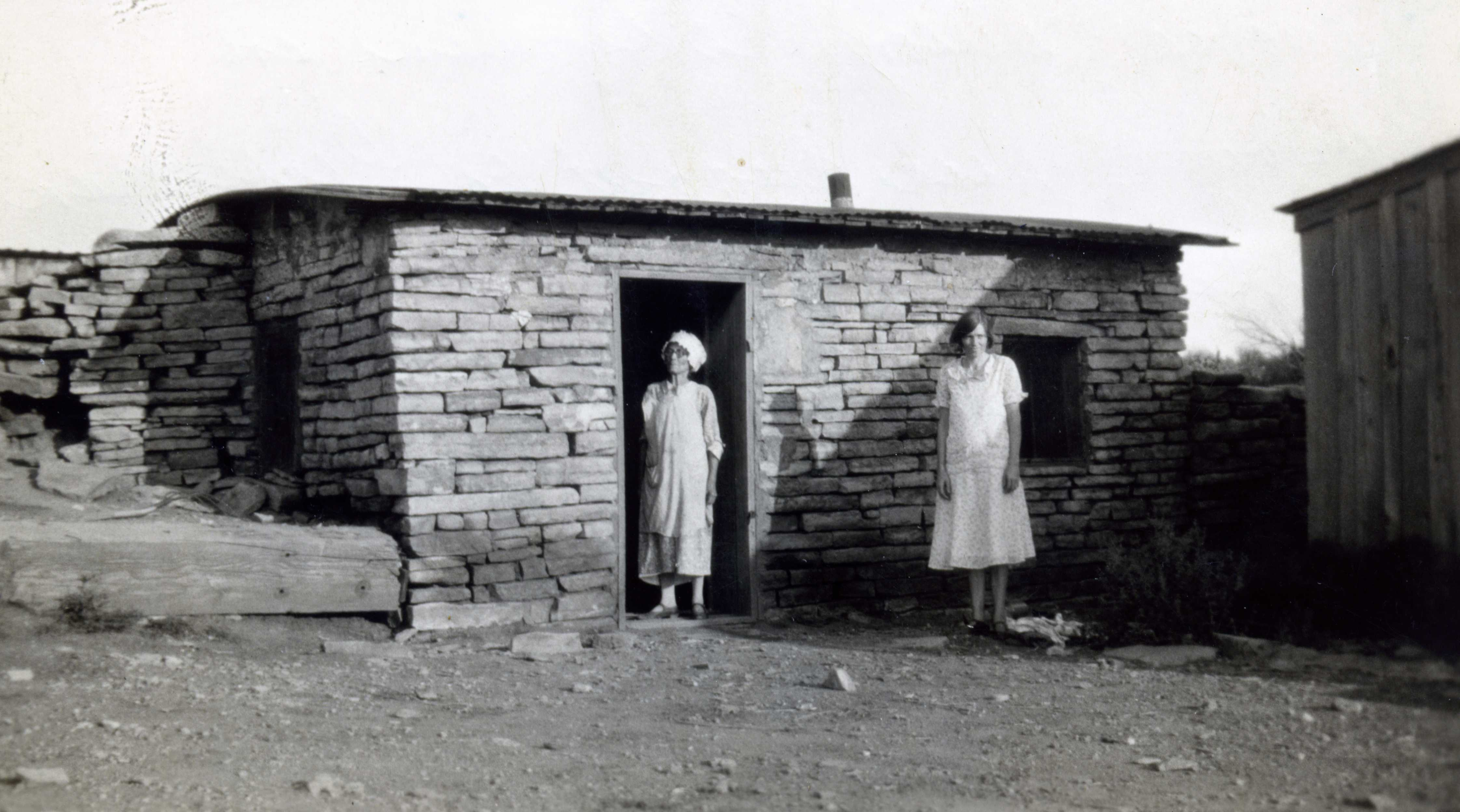
Original half dugout in the early 20th century with Zenobia Perryman (wife of Alonzo) standing in the doorway
