= Aaron, Oklahoma =

- Ghost town
- Location within Oklahoma Location within the United States
- Coordinates: 34.593°N 99.474°W
- Country: United States
- State: Oklahoma
- County: Jackson
- Time zone: UTC-6 (Central (CST))
  - Summer (DST): UTC-5 (CDT)

Aaron is a ghost town in Jackson County, Oklahoma, United States, located 5 miles (8.0 km) northwest of Olustee. It had a post office from January 22, 1899, until January 14, 1905. The town was named after Calvin Aaron, an early settler.Aaron had a post office established on January 22, 1889; it was discontinued effective January 14, 1905, with mail sent to Olustee.
