= Creta, Oklahoma =

- Unincorporated community
- Location within Oklahoma Location within the United States
- Coordinates: 34°31′00″N 99°32′59″W
- Country: United States
- State: Oklahoma
- County: Jackson
- Elevation: 1,352 ft (412 m)
- Time zone: UTC-6 (Central (CST))
  - Summer (DST): UTC-5 (CDT)
- Area code: 580
- GNIS feature ID: 1101955

Creta (also Creta Station and Eldorado) is an unincorporated community along Oklahoma State Highway 6 in Jackson County, Oklahoma, United States. It is at latitude 34.517 and longitude -99.55. The elevation is 1,352 feet. Greta is 6.5 miles west of Olustee and 10 miles south-southeast of Duke. It is on the south bank of Gypsum Creek.
