= Conrad Wegefarth =

German-American oil refiner and prospector

Conrad Wegefarth was a German-American oil refiner and prospector who helped forge the market for coal oil in Europe. Wegefarth County, Texas, was named after him, and he was the father of Harry M. Wegeforth, founder of the Zoological Society of San Diego and San Diego Zoo.

== Biography ==
A court stenographer in southwest Germany, Wegefarth traveled over 300 miles on foot through winter snow to stowaway on a ship bound for the United States. Arriving in Baltimore, he traveled by foot to Pittsburgh, where he took a job as a clerk in a dry goods store. Twelve years later he launched his own oil refining business and traveled to London and Paris to demonstrate coal oil lamps, helping to forge the market for coal oil in Europe.

Twice a widower, with six sons by his first two marriages, Wegefarth married Mary Elizabeth MacArthur in 1867. The couple settled in Baltimore and had seven children: Sons Arthur, George, Paul, Harry, and Charles; and daughters Emma and Ellen. Wegefarth served as president of the Texas Immigrant Aid and Supply Company, and Wegefarth County, Texas, which was established on June 2, 1873, was named after him (the county was abolished August 21, 1876 by an act of the Texas Legislature which established new counties across the Texas panhandle). He gambled heavily in oil development, and was bankrupt by 1873.

All five of Wegefarth and MacArthur's sons went into the field of medicine. Charles drowned in the late 1890s, while Arthur, Paul, and Harry all relocated to San Diego between 1910 and 1915 to open medical practices. There, Harry changed the spelling of the family name to Wegeforth and went on to found the Zoological Society of San Diego and San Diego Zoo in 1916. Emma also moved to San Diego, to work as Harry's medical secretary.
