= Friendship, Oklahoma =

- Town
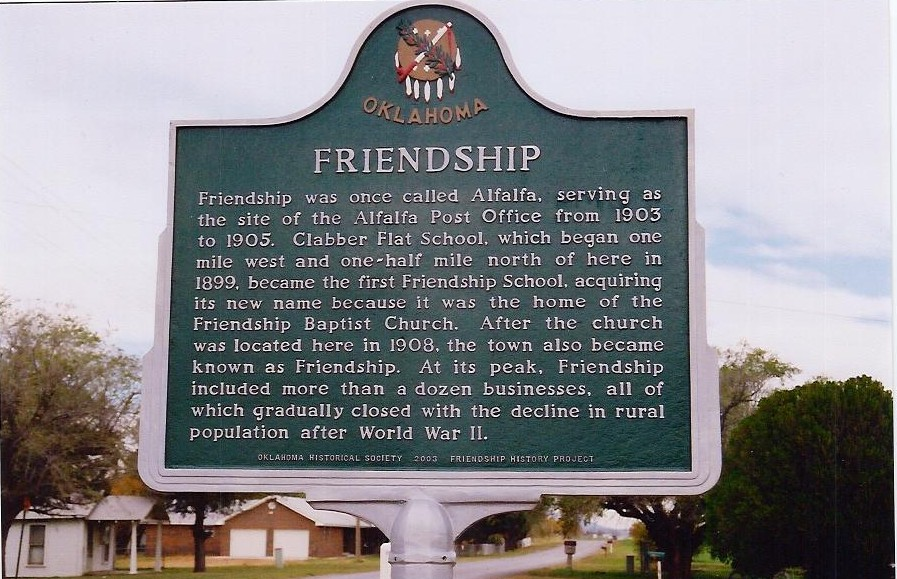
- Friendship state historical marker

- Location within Oklahoma Location within the United States
- Coordinates: 34°41′52″N 99°13′43″W
- Country: United States
- State: Oklahoma
- County: Jackson

Area
  - Total: 0.15 sq mi (0.39 km^{2})
  - Land: 0.15 sq mi (0.39 km^{2})
  - Water: 0 sq mi (0.00 km^{2})
- Elevation: 1,394 ft (425 m)

Population (2020)
  - Total: 23
  - Density: 153/sq mi (59.2/km^{2})
- Time zone: UTC-6 (Central (CST))
  - Summer (DST): UTC-5 (CDT)
- Area code: 580
- FIPS code: 40-27900
- GNIS feature ID: 2412660

Friendship is an incorporated town in Jackson County, Oklahoma, United States. The population was 23 as of the 2020 United States census, just down one person from the 2010 census figure of 24.

== History ==
Before Oklahoma became the 46th state, Friendship was located in Indian Territory, Oklahoma Territory, and Greer County, Texas.

Southwestern Oklahoma was once part of a vast sea of grass stretching as far as the eye could see, populated by millions of buffalo and claimed by Texas, but ruled by the Comanche and Kiowa people. After the last free bands of Comanche and Kiowa were confined to the reservation at Fort Sill in 1875, the area became safe for cattle drives. From 1876 to 1892, millions of longhorns were driven from Texas to Dodge City, Kansas, and Ogallala, Nebraska, over the Great Western Cattle Trail which passed through the middle of what is now Friendship.

In 1880, giant Texas cattle companies, attracted by the rich grazing land, started moving into southwestern Oklahoma. At that time, the area was claimed by Texas as Greer County, based on its assertion that the North Fork of the Red River was the main channel of the Red River. In 1890, the Oklahoma Territory was created, and a lawsuit was filed by the United States to resolve the boundary dispute. In 1896, the U.S. Supreme Court determined that the area was a part of the Oklahoma Territory, not Texas, and it was opened for homesteading in 1897.

Over the years, a number of communities, including Clabber Flat, Alfalfa, Lone Oak, Ricks, Riverside, Pleasant Point and Navajoe, were settled in the Friendship area. Clabber Flat School, which opened in 1899, became the first Friendship School, changing its name to Friendship because of its association with the Friendship Baptist Church, which was organized and often met at the school.

Friendship was originally known as "Alfalfa" and was the site of the Alfalfa Post Office from 1903 to 1905. In 1908, the Friendship Baptist Church was built at Alfalfa, and the town soon became known as "Friendship". In 1920, the Friendship and Navajoe School Districts, and parts of the Lone Oak and Riverside School Districts, consolidated to form a new Friendship Consolidated District. In 1935, Pleasant Point consolidated with Friendship, and in later years, students were gained from the Ozark and Headrick School Districts.

Friendship thrived during the first part of the 20th century. At its peak, the town included two service stations, two grocery stores, two cotton gins, two blacksmith shops, a garage, a hardware store, a barber shop, a cafe, a feed mill, a domino parlor and as many as twenty residences. In addition to the Friendship Baptist Church within the town, the Midway Methodist Church was constructed in 1913, one mile east of the town.

After World War II, improved transportation allowed area residents to take their trade to Altus, and there was a pronounced exodus from the farm to the city. One by one, the businesses in Friendship closed. After the Friendship School burned in 1962, Friendship and Warren schools were consolidated to form a new school district known as Navajo, which built a new school midway between the two towns in 1963. 1982 marked the closing of the Midway Methodist Church.

== Today ==
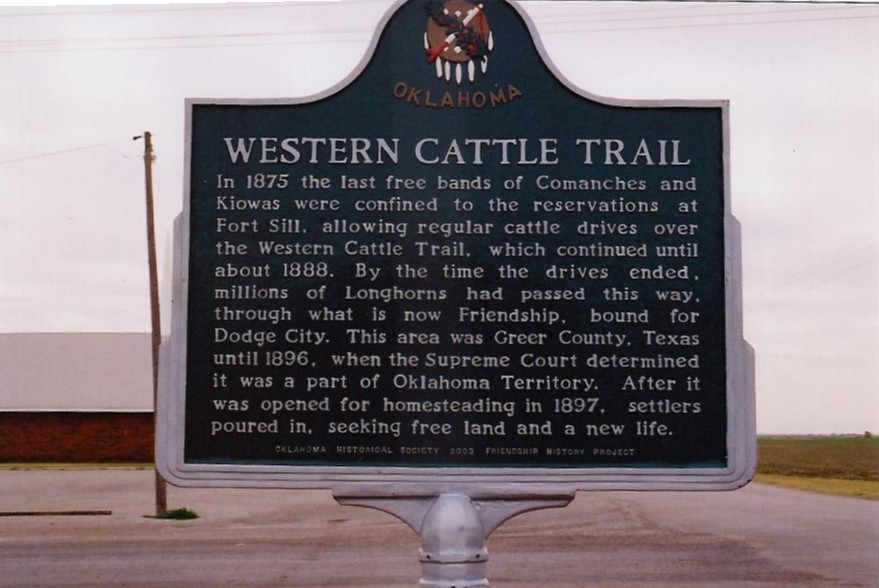
Western Cattle Trail state historical marker

Incorporated in 1999, Friendship has seen a recent increase in residential construction in its vicinity. However, only the Friendship Baptist Church, a community center (which houses the Friendship Volunteer Fire Department) and a few residences actually exist within the town limits.

== Geography ==
Friendship is in northeastern Jackson County, 10 miles (16 km) by road northeast of the center of Altus, the county seat.

According to the U.S. Census Bureau, Friendship has an area of 0.15 square miles (0.39 km^{2}), all land.

== Demographics ==
Historical population
Census	Pop.	Note	%±
2010	24		—
2020	23		−4.2%
U.S. Decennial Census

=== 2020 census ===
As of the 2020 census, Friendship had a population of 23. The median age was 59.5 years. 30.4% of residents were under the age of 18 and 30.4% of residents were 65 years of age or older. For every 100 females there were 187.5 males, and for every 100 females age 18 and over there were 128.6 males age 18 and over.

0.0% of residents lived in urban areas, while 100.0% lived in rural areas.

There were 5 households in Friendship, of which 20.0% had children under the age of 18 living in them. Of all households, 60.0% were married-couple households, 20.0% were households with a male householder and no spouse or partner present, and 0.0% were households with a female householder and no spouse or partner present. About 20.0% of all households were made up of individuals and 0.0% had someone living alone who was 65 years of age or older.

There were 12 housing units, of which 58.3% were vacant. The homeowner vacancy rate was 42.9% and the rental vacancy rate was 0.0%.

Racial composition as of the 2020 census
Race	Number	Percent
White	22	95.7%
Black or African American	0	0.0%
American Indian and Alaska Native	0	0.0%
Asian	0	0.0%
Native Hawaiian and Other Pacific Islander	0	0.0%
Some other race	0	0.0%
Two or more races	1	4.3%
Hispanic or Latino (of any race)	3	13.0%
