= Elmer, Oklahoma =

- Town
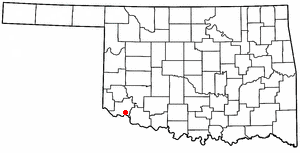
- Location of Elmer, Oklahoma
- Coordinates: 34°28′51″N 99°21′08″W
- Country: United States
- State: Oklahoma
- County: Jackson

Area
  - Total: 0.42 sq mi (1.09 km^{2})
  - Land: 0.42 sq mi (1.09 km^{2})
  - Water: 0 sq mi (0.00 km^{2})
- Elevation: 1,309 ft (399 m)

Population (2020)
  - Total: 65
  - Density: 154.2/sq mi (59.53/km^{2})
- Time zone: UTC-6 (Central (CST))
  - Summer (DST): UTC-5 (CDT)
- ZIP code: 73539
- Area code: 580
- FIPS code: 40-23550
- GNIS feature ID: 2412477

Elmer is a town in Jackson County, Oklahoma, United States. As of the 2020 census, Elmer had a population of 65.

== Geography ==
According to the United States Census Bureau, the town has a total area of 0.4 square miles (1.0 km^{2}), all land.

=== Climate ===
Climate data for Elmer, Oklahoma
Month	Jan	Feb	Mar	Apr	May	Jun	Jul	Aug	Sep	Oct	Nov	Dec	Year
Mean daily maximum °F (°C)	53.3 (11.8)	58.6 (14.8)	68.6 (20.3)	78.4 (25.8)	85.5 (29.7)	93.3 (34.1)	98.2 (36.8)	96.4 (35.8)	88.2 (31.2)	78.9 (26.1)	65.4 (18.6)	54.9 (12.7)	76.6 (24.8)
Mean daily minimum °F (°C)	25.6 (−3.6)	29.8 (−1.2)	38.4 (3.6)	48.3 (9.1)	57.6 (14.2)	66.4 (19.1)	70.8 (21.6)	69.1 (20.6)	62.1 (16.7)	50.2 (10.1)	38.8 (3.8)	28.7 (−1.8)	48.8 (9.3)
Average precipitation inches (mm)	0.8 (20)	1.1 (28)	1.6 (41)	1.9 (48)	4.2 (110)	3.5 (89)	1.8 (46)	2.5 (64)	3.4 (86)	2.4 (61)	1.3 (33)	0.9 (23)	25.4 (650)
Source 1: weather.com
Source 2: Weatherbase.com

== Demographics ==
Historical population
Census	Pop.	Note	%±
1930	288		—
1940	249		−13.5%
1950	145		−41.8%
1960	120		−17.2%
1970	138		15.0%
1980	131		−5.1%
1990	132		0.8%
2000	94		−28.8%
2010	96		2.1%
2020	65		−32.3%
U.S. Decennial Census

=== 2020 census ===
As of the 2020 census, Elmer had a population of 65. The median age was 49.9 years. 24.6% of residents were under the age of 18 and 10.8% of residents were 65 years of age or older. For every 100 females there were 91.2 males, and for every 100 females age 18 and over there were 104.2 males age 18 and over.

0.0% of residents lived in urban areas, while 100.0% lived in rural areas.

There were 24 households in Elmer, of which 33.3% had children under the age of 18 living in them. Of all households, 62.5% were married-couple households, 16.7% were households with a male householder and no spouse or partner present, and 20.8% were households with a female householder and no spouse or partner present. About 12.5% of all households were made up of individuals and 4.2% had someone living alone who was 65 years of age or older.

There were 35 housing units, of which 31.4% were vacant. The homeowner vacancy rate was 15.4% and the rental vacancy rate was 0.0%.

Racial composition as of the 2020 census
Race	Number	Percent
White	51	78.5%
Black or African American	1	1.5%
American Indian and Alaska Native	2	3.1%
Asian	2	3.1%
Native Hawaiian and Other Pacific Islander	0	0.0%
Some other race	4	6.2%
Two or more races	5	7.7%
Hispanic or Latino (of any race)	8	12.3%

=== 2010 census ===
As of the census of 2010, there were 96 people living in the town. The population density was 240 inhabitants per square mile (93/km^{2}). There were 58 housing units at an average density of 145 per square mile (56/km^{2}). The racial makeup of the town was 87.50% White, 2.08% African American, 2.08% Native American, 1.04% Pacific Islander, 6.25% from other races, and 1.04% from two or more races. Hispanic or Latino of any race were 12.50% of the population.

There were 41 households, out of which 22.0% had children under the age of 18 living with them, 56.1% were married couples living together, 12.2% had a female householder with no husband present, and 31.7% were non-families. 29.3% of all households were made up of individuals, and 12.2% had someone living alone who was 65 years of age or older. The average household size was 2.34 and the average family size was 2.79.

In the town, the population was spread out, with 21.9% under the age of 18, 6.3% from 18 to 24, 30.2% from 25 to 44, 27.1% from 45 to 64, and 14.6% who were 65 years of age or older. The median age was 37 years. For every 100 females, there were 104.3 males. For every 100 females age 18 and over, there were 97.4 males.

The median income for a household in the town was $35,208, and the median income for a family was $35,208. Males had a median income of $18,750 versus $14,167 for females. The per capita income for the town was $15,165. There were 10.3% of families and 9.3% of the population living below the poverty line, including no under eighteens and 17.6% of those over 64.
