= Humphreys, Oklahoma =

- Unincorporated community
- Location within Oklahoma Location within the United States
- Coordinates: 34°33′21″N 99°14′14″W
- Country: United States
- State: Oklahoma
- County: Jackson
- Elevation: 1,286 ft (392 m)
- Time zone: UTC-6 (Central (CST))
  - Summer (DST): UTC-5 (CDT)
- Area code: 580
- GNIS feature ID: 1094017

Humphreys is an unincorporated community in southeast Jackson County, Oklahoma, United States. It is located 7.5 miles southeast of Altus and six miles northeast of Tipton in adjacent Tillman County. The old Missouri–Kansas–Texas Railroad passes through the community. The community was founded in 1909 and named after a local rancher, James Humphreys.
