= Martha, Oklahoma =

- Town
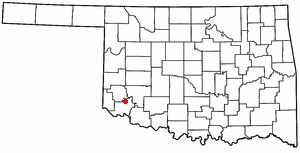
- Location of Martha, Oklahoma
- Coordinates: 34°43′34″N 99°23′12″W
- Country: United States
- State: Oklahoma
- County: Jackson

Area
  - Total: 0.25 sq mi (0.65 km^{2})
  - Land: 0.25 sq mi (0.65 km^{2})
  - Water: 0 sq mi (0.00 km^{2})
- Elevation: 1,411 ft (430 m)

Population (2020)
  - Total: 162
  - Density: 643/sq mi (248.1/km^{2})
- Time zone: UTC-6 (Central (CST))
  - Summer (DST): UTC-5 (CDT)
- ZIP code: 73556
- Area code: 580
- FIPS code: 40-46700
- GNIS feature ID: 2412960

Martha is a town in Jackson County, Oklahoma, United States. The population was 162 as of the 2020 United States census. The town is located about 9 driving miles north-northwest of the county seat of Altus.

== Geography ==
According to the United States Census Bureau, the town has a total area of 0.2 square miles (0.52 km^{2}), all land.

== Demographics ==
Historical population
Census	Pop.	Note	%±
1930	327		—
1940	242		−26.0%
1950	222		−8.3%
1960	243		9.5%
1970	268		10.3%
1980	219		−18.3%
1990	217		−0.9%
2000	205		−5.5%
2010	162		−21.0%
2020	162		0.0%
U.S. Decennial Census

=== 2020 census ===
As of the 2020 census, Martha had a population of 162. The median age was 33.0 years. 25.9% of residents were under the age of 18 and 8.0% of residents were 65 years of age or older. For every 100 females there were 121.9 males, and for every 100 females age 18 and over there were 126.4 males age 18 and over.

0.0% of residents lived in urban areas, while 100.0% lived in rural areas.

There were 56 households in Martha, of which 39.3% had children under the age of 18 living in them. Of all households, 46.4% were married-couple households, 30.4% were households with a male householder and no spouse or partner present, and 17.9% were households with a female householder and no spouse or partner present. About 25.0% of all households were made up of individuals and 10.7% had someone living alone who was 65 years of age or older.

There were 73 housing units, of which 23.3% were vacant. The homeowner vacancy rate was 2.2% and the rental vacancy rate was 16.7%.

Racial composition as of the 2020 census
Race	Number	Percent
White	110	67.9%
Black or African American	0	0.0%
American Indian and Alaska Native	4	2.5%
Asian	0	0.0%
Native Hawaiian and Other Pacific Islander	0	0.0%
Some other race	9	5.6%
Two or more races	39	24.1%
Hispanic or Latino (of any race)	65	40.1%

=== 2000 census ===
As of the census of 2000, there were 205 people, 82 households, and 49 families residing in the town. The population density was 816.3 inhabitants per square mile (315.2/km^{2}). There were 98 housing units at an average density of 390.3 per square mile (150.7/km^{2}). The racial makeup of the town was 72.20% White, 2.44% African American, 6.34% Native American, 12.68% from other races, and 6.34% from two or more races. Hispanic or Latino of any race were 26.34% of the population.

There were 82 households, out of which 35.4% had children under the age of 18 living with them, 50.0% were married couples living together, 4.9% had a female householder with no husband present, and 40.2% were non-families. 37.8% of all households were made up of individuals, and 17.1% had someone living alone who was 65 years of age or older. The average household size was 2.50 and the average family size was 3.47.

In the town, the population was spread out, with 28.8% under the age of 18, 12.2% from 18 to 24, 26.3% from 25 to 44, 21.0% from 45 to 64, and 11.7% who were 65 years of age or older. The median age was 35 years. For every 100 females, there were 122.8 males. For every 100 females age 18 and over, there were 114.7 males.

The median income for a household in the town was $20,000, and the median income for a family was $30,000. Males had a median income of $31,389 versus $13,125 for females. The per capita income for the town was $9,799. About 24.0% of families and 21.3% of the population were below the poverty line, including 16.4% of those under the age of eighteen and 40.9% of those 65 or over.
