= Wegefarth County, Texas =

Wegefarth County
- Former U.S. county in Texas
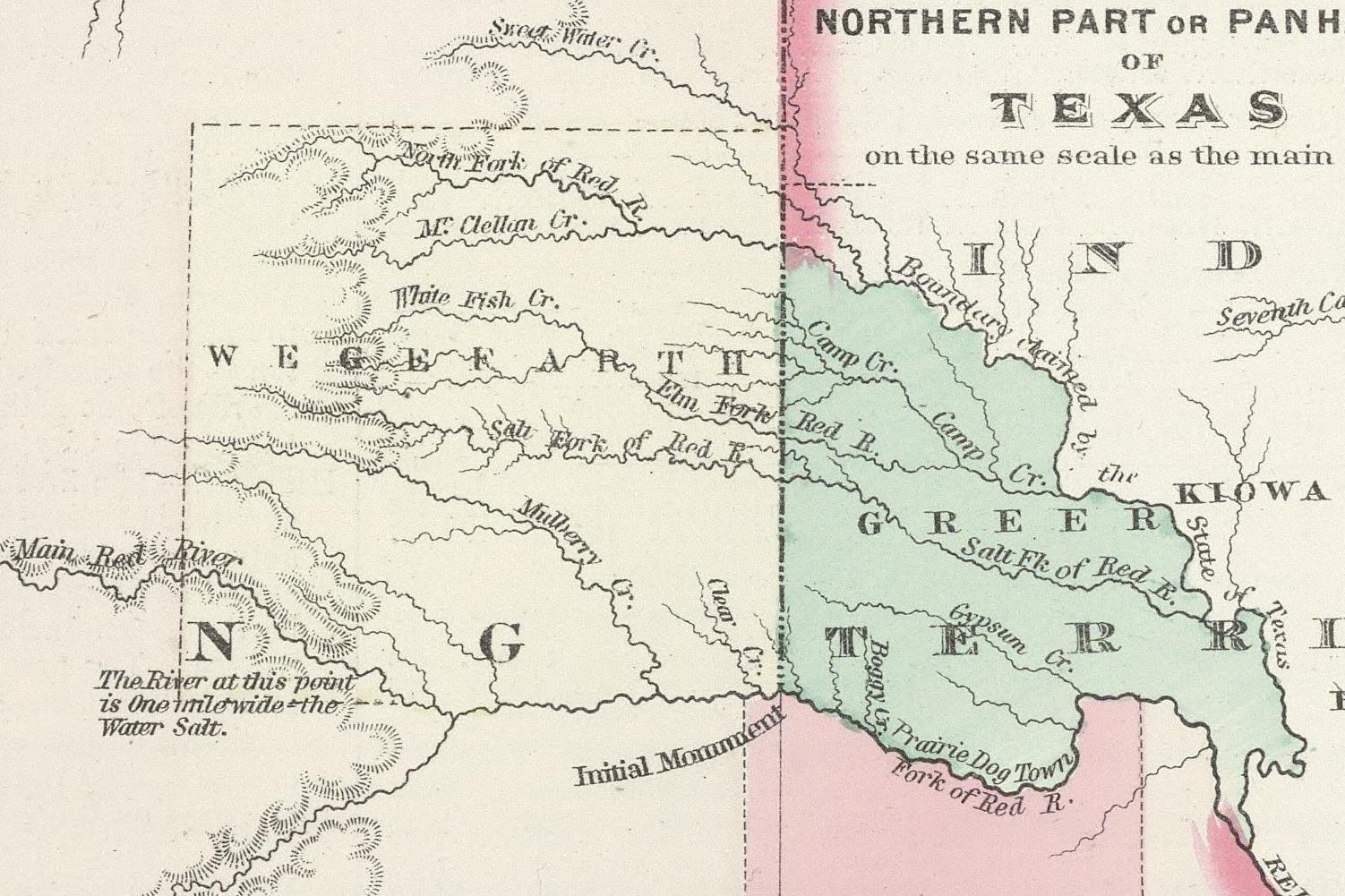
- Map of Greer and Wegefarth counties in 1874

- Founded: 1873
- Abolished: 1876
- Named for: Conrad Wegefarth

Wegefarth County was a Texas county established on June 2, 1873, from Bexar and Young territories and abolished on August 21, 1876. The county shared boundaries with Hardeman County, Indian Territory, and with Greer County which was subject to a territorial dispute between Texas and the U.S. government which maintained that Greer County properly belonged to Indian Territory. The county was named after C. Wegefarth.

Wegefarth County was abolished under a legislative act that created new counties across the Panhandle and, more broadly, across much of the northwestern area of the state. Specifically, those counties formed over lands previously held by Wegefarth were Collingsworth and Donley as well as portions of Briscoe, Childress, Gray, Hall, and Wheeler counties.

== See also ==
- List of defunct counties in Texas
