= Greer County, Texas =

Former Texas county

Coordinates: 34.7°N 99.7°W

Greer County
- Former U.S. county in Texas
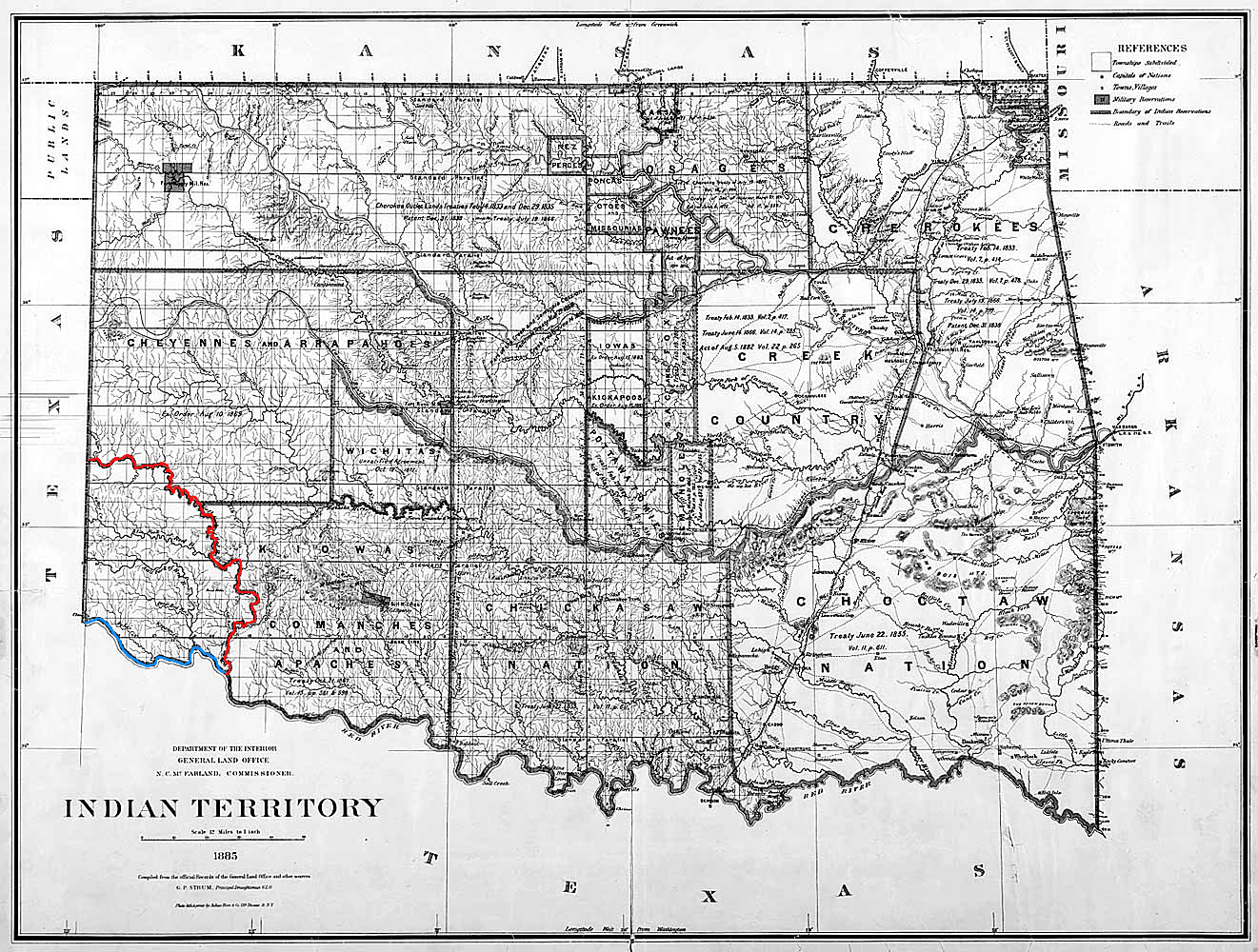
- Map of Greer County, Texas c. 1885

- Founded: 1860
- Abolished: 1896
- Named for: John Alexander Greer
- Seat: Mangum

Population
  - Estimate (1890): 5,336

Greer County was a county created by the Texas legislature on February 8, 1860, on land claimed by both the State of Texas and the Federal Government of the United States.

Named for the state's Lieutenant Governor, John Alexander Greer, the region of Greer County is now in the present-day State of Oklahoma.

== Origin of the dispute ==
The dispute arose from a map submitted with the Adams–Onís Treaty of 1819. The treaty stated that the boundary between the French claims on the north and the Spanish claims on the south was Rio Roxo de Natchitoches (Red River) until it reached the 100th meridian west as noted on John Melish's map published in 1818. The problem was that the 100th meridian on the Melish map was some 90 miles (140 km) east of the true 100th meridian and the Red River forked about 50 miles (80 km) east of the 100th meridian. Texas claimed the land south of the North Fork (red on the map) and the United States claimed the land north of the South Fork (blue on the map, later called the Prairie Dog Town Fork Red River).

== United States vs. State of Texas ==
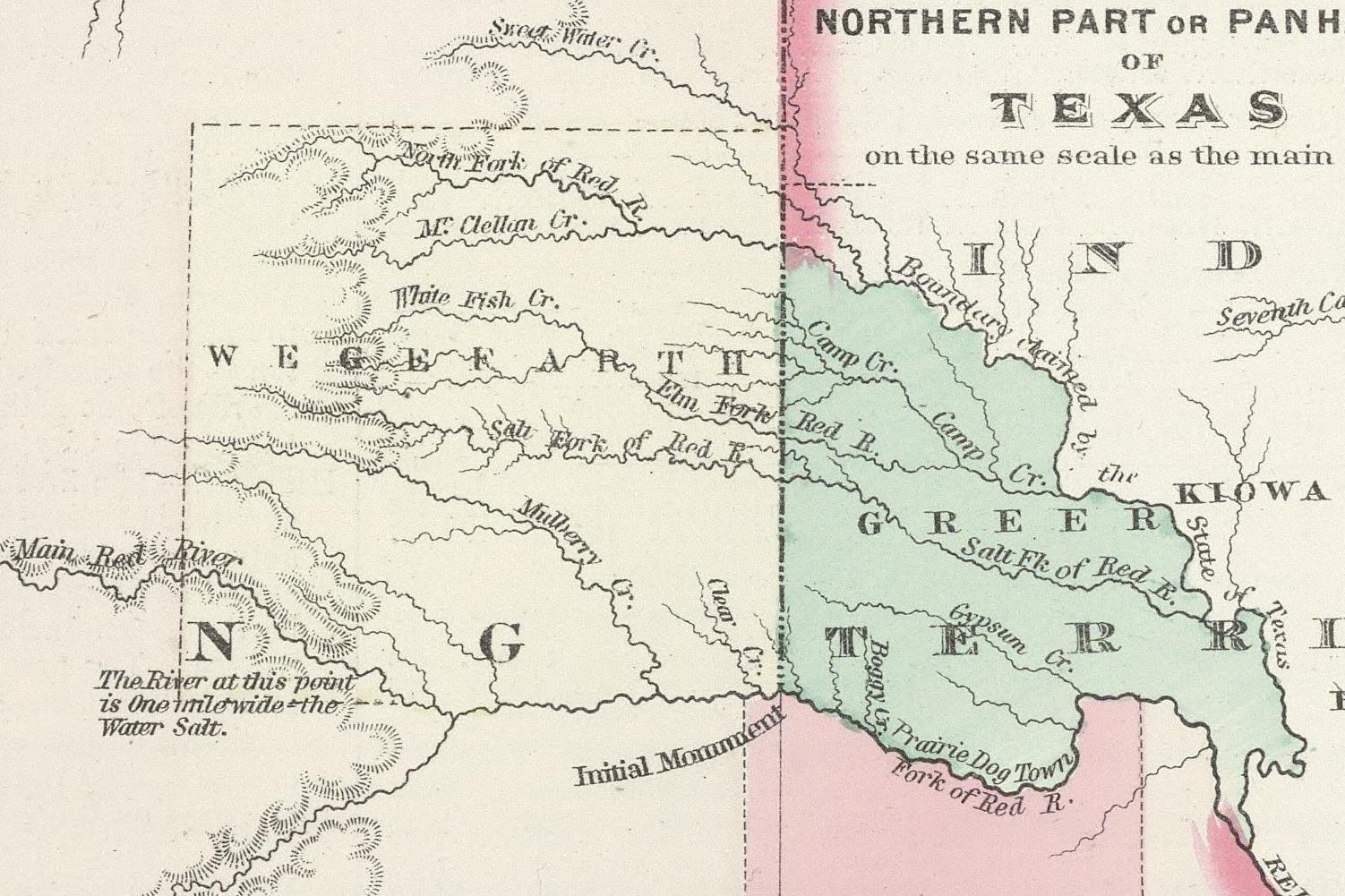
Map of Greer and Wegefarth counties in 1874.

The dispute resulted in a lawsuit, which was heard by the Supreme Court under its original jurisdiction. The Court's opinion, in United States v. State of Texas 162 U.S. 1 (1896), issued on March 16, held that the land of some 1.5 million acres (6,100 km^{2}; 2,300 sq mi) belonged to the United States. Following that ruling, on May 4, 1896, the land was officially assigned by Congress to Oklahoma Territory. The Greer County Homestead Law, passed just afterwards, gave existing settlers the 160 acres (0.65 km^{2}) they were living on and the option to purchase an additional 160 acres for $1 per acre ($250/km^{2}).

== Legacy ==
When Oklahoma became the 46th U.S. state on November 16, 1907, old "Greer County" was divided into Greer, Jackson, and southwest Beckham counties. Harmon County was created May 22, 1909 by a vote of the people from a portion of Greer County.

== See also ==
- Oklahoma
- Greer County, Oklahoma
- Harmon County, Oklahoma
- Jackson County, Oklahoma
- Beckham County, Oklahoma
- Texas Panhandle
- Childress County, Texas
- Collingsworth County, Texas
- Hardeman County, Texas
- List of extinct United States counties
