= Jackson County Courthouse (Oklahoma) =

- U.S. National Register of Historic Places
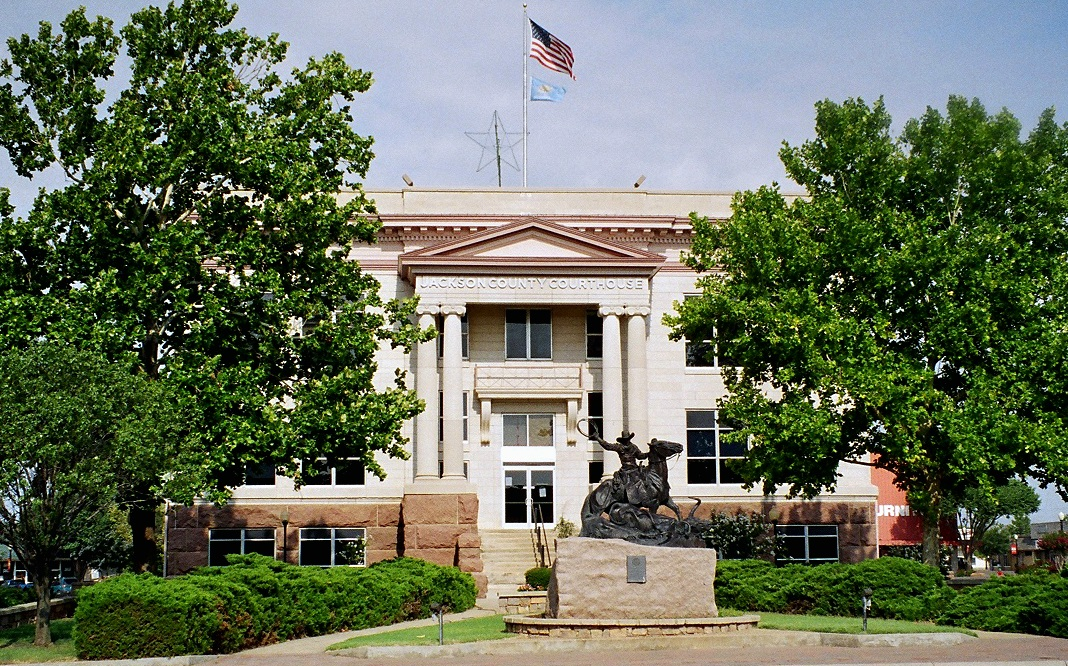

- Location within Oklahoma Location within the United States
- Interactive map showing the location of Jackson County Courthouse
- Location: Main St. and Broadway, Altus, Oklahoma
- Coordinates: 34°38′18″N 99°20′3″W
- Built: 1911
- Built by: Rowles & Bailey
- Architect: Hair, C.E., & Co.
- Architectural style: Classical Revival
- MPS: County Courthouses of Oklahoma TR
- NRHP reference No.: 84003064
- Added to NRHP: August 23, 1984

The Jackson County Courthouse, located at Main Street and Broadway in Altus, is the county courthouse serving Jackson County, Oklahoma. Construction began on the courthouse in 1910, two years after Altus became the permanent county seat of Jackson County, and was completed in 1911. Architecture firm C.E. Hair and Company designed the building in the Classical Revival style; it was the first county courthouse the firm planned in Oklahoma. The three-story courthouse is built from limestone with a granite foundation. A two-story portico supported by four columns surrounds the main entrance. While a metal dome originally topped the building, it was removed in 1938 due to irreparable corrosion.

The courthouse is part of a public square that also contains the county jail and several other structures. The jail was constructed in 1924–25 to replace a jail in the courthouse basement. Due to a series of additions and renovations in the 1960s, it no longer retains its historic appearance. The courthouse grounds also include a United Daughters of the Confederacy memorial, a well, and a statue of a cowboy.

The courthouse was listed on the National Register of Historic Places in 1984. In 2008, its listing boundaries expanded to include the courthouse square; however, only the Confederate memorial is considered a contributing structure to the listing.
