= Jackson County, Oklahoma =

County in Oklahoma, United States

- County
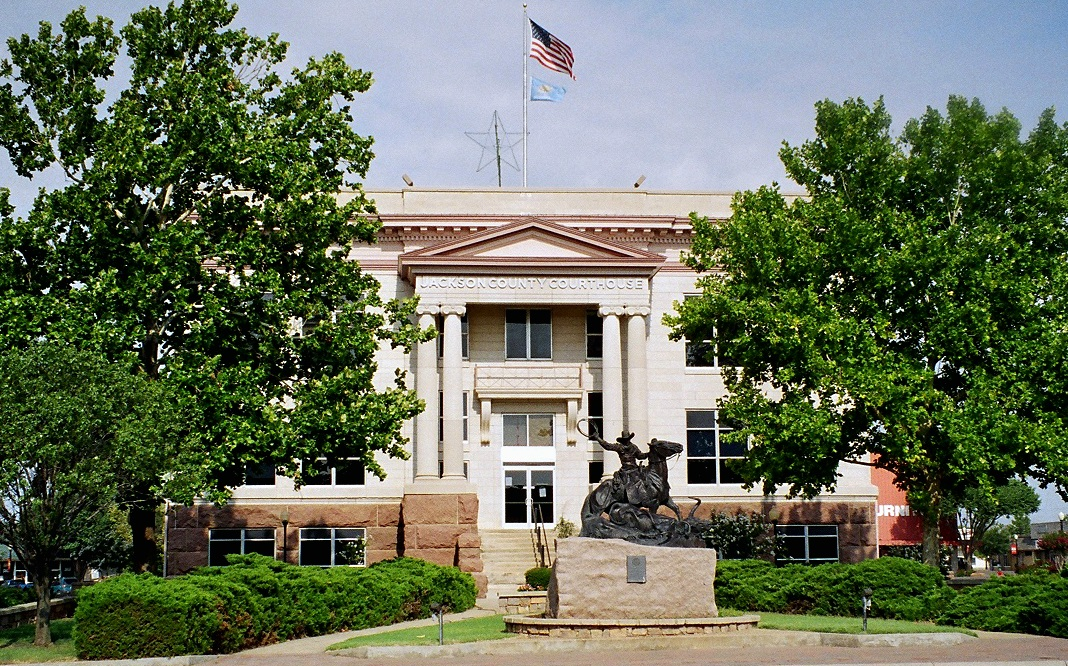
- Jackson County Courthouse in Altus

- Location within the U.S. state of Oklahoma
- Coordinates: 34°35′N 99°25′W
- Country: United States
- State: Oklahoma
- Founded: 1907
- Named for: Stonewall Jackson
- Seat: Altus
- Largest city: Altus

Area
  - Total: 804 sq mi (2,080 km^{2})
  - Land: 803 sq mi (2,080 km^{2})
  - Water: 1.6 sq mi (4.1 km^{2}) 0.2%

Population (2020)
  - Estimate (2025): 24,764 ▼
  - Density: 31/sq mi (12/km^{2})
- Time zone: UTC−6 (Central)
  - Summer (DST): UTC−5 (CDT)
- Congressional district: 3rd

Jackson County is a county located in the southwestern corner of the U.S. state of Oklahoma. As of the 2020 census, the population was 24,785. Its county seat is Altus. According to the Encyclopedia of Oklahoma History and Culture, the county was named for two historical figures: President Andrew Jackson and Confederate General Stonewall Jackson. One source states that the county was named only for the former president, while an earlier source states it was named only for General Stonewall Jackson. Jackson County comprises the Altus, OK micropolitan statistical area.

== History ==
After a dispute over the Adams-Onís Treaty of 1819, both the governments of the United States and the state of Texas claimed ownership of some 1,500,000 acres (6,100 km^{2}) in what was then operated as Greer County, Texas. Litigation followed, and in the case of United States v. State of Texas 162 U.S. 1 (1896), issued on March 16, the Supreme Court, having original jurisdiction over the case, decided in favor of the United States. Greer County was then assigned to the Oklahoma Territory on May 4, 1896. When Oklahoma became the 46th U.S. state (November 16, 1907), old "Greer County" was divided into Greer, Jackson, and part of Beckham counties.

Altus was originally designated as the seat of Jackson County. Olustee vied in an unsuccessful bid to replace Altus as the seat in an election on July 18, 1908.

== Geography ==
According to the U.S. Census Bureau, the county has a total area of 804 square miles (2,080 km^{2}), of which 803 square miles (2,080 km^{2}) is land and 1.6 square miles (4.1 km^{2}) (0.2%) is water.

Most of the county is within the Red Bed Plains physiographic region. The western part lies in the Gypsum Hills and the northeastern part is in the Wichita Mountains. The county is drained by the Red River and its tributaries, the North Fork of the Red River and the Salt Fork of the Red River.

=== Major highways ===
- U.S. Highway 62
- U.S. Highway 283
- State Highway 5
- State Highway 6
- State Highway 34
- State Highway 19

=== Adjacent counties ===
- Greer County (north)
- Kiowa County (northeast)
- Tillman County (east)
- Wilbarger County, Texas (south)
- Hardeman County, Texas (southwest)
- Harmon County (west)

== Demographics ==
Historical population
Census	Pop.	Note	%±
1910	23,737		—
1920	22,141		−6.7%
1930	28,910		30.6%
1940	22,708		−21.5%
1950	20,082		−11.6%
1960	29,736		48.1%
1970	30,902		3.9%
1980	30,356		−1.8%
1990	28,764		−5.2%
2000	28,439		−1.1%
2010	26,446		−7.0%
2020	24,785		−6.3%
2025 (est.)	24,764	▼	−0.1%
U.S. Decennial Census; 1790-1960 1900-1990; 1990-2000 2010

=== 2020 census ===
As of the 2020 United States census, the county had a population of 24,785. Of the residents, 24.6% were under the age of 18 and 15.9% were 65 years of age or older; the median age was 35.4 years. For every 100 females there were 101.8 males, and for every 100 females age 18 and over there were 101.2 males.

The racial makeup of the county was 66.7% White, 7.0% Black or African American, 2.2% American Indian and Alaska Native, 1.4% Asian, 9.7% from some other race, and 12.8% from two or more races. Hispanic or Latino residents of any race comprised 24.0% of the population.

There were 9,795 households in the county, of which 32.0% had children under the age of 18 living with them and 23.7% had a female householder with no spouse or partner present. About 29.4% of all households were made up of individuals and 11.3% had someone living alone who was 65 years of age or older.

There were 12,017 housing units, of which 18.5% were vacant. Among occupied housing units, 60.3% were owner-occupied and 39.7% were renter-occupied. The homeowner vacancy rate was 3.4% and the rental vacancy rate was 17.6%.

=== 2000 census ===
As of the census of 2000, there were 28,439 people, 10,590 households, and 7,667 families residing in the county. The population density was 35 people per square mile (14 people/km^{2}). There were 12,377 housing units at an average density of 15 units per square mile (5.8/km^{2}). The racial makeup of the county was 76.14% White, 8.03% Black or African American, 1.74% Native American, 1.16% Asian, 0.17% Pacific Islander, 9.34% from other races, and 3.42% from two or more races. 15.63% of the population were Hispanic or Latino of any race.

There were 10,590 households, out of which 38.10% had children under the age of 18 living with them, 57.80% were married couples living together, 10.70% had a female householder with no husband present, and 27.60% were non-families. 24.20% of all households were made up of individuals, and 9.70% had someone living alone who was 65 years of age or older. The average household size was 2.61 and the average family size was 3.11.

In the county, the population was spread out, with 29.20% under the age of 18, 10.30% from 18 to 24, 29.00% from 25 to 44, 19.60% from 45 to 64, and 11.90% who were 65 years of age or older. The median age was 33 years. For every 100 females there were 99.10 males. For every 100 females age 18 and over, there were 94.80 males.

The median income for a household in the county was $30,737, and the median income for a family was $38,265. Males had a median income of $28,240 versus $19,215 for females. The per capita income for the county was $15,454. About 13.60% of families and 16.20% of the population were below the poverty line, including 20.70% of those under age 18 and 14.40% of those age 65 or over.

== Politics ==
Voter Registration and Party Enrollment as of June 30, 2023
Party	Number of Voters	Percentage
Democratic	2,853	22.66%
Republican	7,323	58.16%
Others	2,415	19.18%
Total	12,591	100%

United States presidential election results for Jackson County, Oklahoma
Year	Republican		Democratic		Third party(ies)	
Year	No.	%	No.	%	No.	%
1908	627	22.58%	1,897	68.31%	253	9.11%
1912	588	19.02%	1,819	58.83%	685	22.15%
1916	409	12.77%	2,096	65.44%	698	21.79%
1920	1,345	30.18%	2,694	60.46%	417	9.36%
1924	941	24.74%	2,342	61.57%	521	13.70%
1928	3,440	57.72%	2,493	41.83%	27	0.45%
1932	603	9.48%	5,759	90.52%	0	0.00%
1936	1,095	16.66%	5,435	82.71%	41	0.62%
1940	1,540	24.03%	4,832	75.41%	36	0.56%
1944	1,313	21.20%	4,866	78.59%	13	0.21%
1948	923	14.48%	5,450	85.52%	0	0.00%
1952	2,627	34.80%	4,921	65.20%	0	0.00%
1956	2,343	34.57%	4,435	65.43%	0	0.00%
1960	3,375	47.30%	3,761	52.70%	0	0.00%
1964	2,366	28.64%	5,894	71.36%	0	0.00%
1968	2,248	30.36%	3,371	45.52%	1,786	24.12%
1972	5,519	71.61%	2,054	26.65%	134	1.74%
1976	3,189	39.07%	4,914	60.20%	60	0.74%
1980	4,327	50.58%	4,031	47.12%	196	2.29%
1984	5,773	65.64%	2,996	34.06%	26	0.30%
1988	4,423	55.28%	3,542	44.27%	36	0.45%
1992	3,893	41.33%	3,273	34.75%	2,254	23.93%
1996	4,422	51.53%	3,245	37.81%	915	10.66%
2000	5,591	68.53%	2,515	30.82%	53	0.65%
2004	7,024	75.89%	2,232	24.11%	0	0.00%
2008	6,719	74.80%	2,264	25.20%	0	0.00%
2012	5,965	75.33%	1,954	24.67%	0	0.00%
2016	5,969	76.47%	1,473	18.87%	364	4.66%
2020	6,392	77.75%	1,646	20.02%	183	2.23%
2024	6,295	78.17%	1,602	19.89%	156	1.94%

== Economy ==
The county's economy has been based on farming and livestock since its inception. The major crops include cotton, wheat, corn, alfalfa, and hay. Barley and sorghum became major crops in the late 1940s. Livestock consisted of horses, cattle, mules, swine and sheep. Altus Air Force Base is the county's largest non-farm employer. There were 16 manufacturers in the county by 2000. These included Altus Athletic Manufacturing, the Bar-S Foods Company, and the Republic Gypsum plant. (The Luscombe Aircraft manufacturing plant, later Quartz Mountain Aerospace, went bankrupt in 2009.)

== Education ==
The Western Oklahoma State College (WOSC) and the Southwest Technology Center, both in Altus, offer higher education opportunities in Jackson County.

== Communities ==
=== City ===
- Altus (county seat)

=== Towns ===
- Blair
- East Duke
- Eldorado
- Elmer
- Friendship
- Headrick
- Martha
- Olustee

=== Unincorporated communities ===
- Creta
- Hess
- Humphreys
- Victory

=== Ghost towns ===
- Aaron
- Navajoe

== See also ==
- National Register of Historic Places listings in Jackson County, Oklahoma
