= Olustee, Oklahoma =

- Town
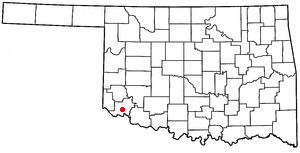
- Location of Olustee, Oklahoma
- Coordinates: 34°32′52″N 99°25′27″W
- Country: United States
- State: Oklahoma
- County: Jackson

Area
  - Total: 0.83 sq mi (2.16 km^{2})
  - Land: 0.83 sq mi (2.16 km^{2})
  - Water: 0 sq mi (0.00 km^{2})
- Elevation: 1,332 ft (406 m)

Population (2020)
  - Total: 468
  - Density: 561.7/sq mi (216.88/km^{2})
- Time zone: UTC-6 (Central (CST))
  - Summer (DST): UTC-5 (CDT)
- ZIP code: 73560
- Area code: 580
- FIPS code: 40-55450
- GNIS feature ID: 2413080

Olustee is a town in Jackson County, Oklahoma, United States. "Olustee" is said to be a Seminole word meaning "pond" or from the Creek (Muscogee) language ue-lvste (/oy-lást-i/) meaning "black water", and being taken from the Battle of Olustee in Florida. The population was 468 as of the 2020 United States census.

== Geography ==
Olustee is located 14 miles (23 km) southwest of Altus along Oklahoma State Highway 6.

According to the United States Census Bureau, the town has a total area of 0.8 square miles (2.1 km^{2}), all land.

== Demographics ==
Historical population
Census	Pop.	Note	%±
1910	850		—
1920	665		−21.8%
1930	651		−2.1%
1940	248		−61.9%
1950	455		83.5%
1960	463		1.8%
1970	819		76.9%
1980	721		−12.0%
1990	701		−2.8%
2000	680		−3.0%
2010	607		−10.7%
2020	468		−22.9%
U.S. Decennial Census

=== 2020 census ===
As of the 2020 census, Olustee had a population of 468. The median age was 36.8 years. 24.8% of residents were under the age of 18 and 14.5% of residents were 65 years of age or older. For every 100 females there were 99.1 males, and for every 100 females age 18 and over there were 104.7 males age 18 and over.

0.0% of residents lived in urban areas, while 100.0% lived in rural areas.

There were 173 households in Olustee, of which 35.8% had children under the age of 18 living in them. Of all households, 48.0% were married-couple households, 20.2% were households with a male householder and no spouse or partner present, and 21.4% were households with a female householder and no spouse or partner present. About 24.3% of all households were made up of individuals and 8.0% had someone living alone who was 65 years of age or older.

There were 242 housing units, of which 28.5% were vacant. The homeowner vacancy rate was 5.3% and the rental vacancy rate was 20.2%.

Racial composition as of the 2020 census
Race	Number	Percent
White	302	64.5%
Black or African American	10	2.1%
American Indian and Alaska Native	21	4.5%
Asian	8	1.7%
Native Hawaiian and Other Pacific Islander	0	0.0%
Some other race	58	12.4%
Two or more races	69	14.7%
Hispanic or Latino (of any race)	142	30.3%

=== 2000 census ===
As of the census of 2000, there were 680 people, 250 households, and 185 families residing in the town. The population density was 823.8 inhabitants per square mile (318.1/km^{2}). There were 280 housing units at an average density of 339.2 per square mile (131.0/km^{2}). The racial makeup of the town was 70.15% White, 0.74% African American, 3.97% Native American, 0.59% Asian, 19.71% from other races, and 4.85% from two or more races. Hispanic or Latino of any race were 32.79% of the population.

There were 250 households, out of which 42.8% had children under the age of 18 living with them, 55.6% were married couples living together, 13.6% had a female householder with no husband present, and 26.0% were non-families. 23.6% of all households were made up of individuals, and 11.6% had someone living alone who was 65 years of age or older. The average household size was 2.72 and the average family size was 3.16.

In the town, the population was spread out, with 33.5% under the age of 18, 8.2% from 18 to 24, 24.3% from 25 to 44, 21.6% from 45 to 64, and 12.4% who were 65 years of age or older. The median age was 33 years. For every 100 females, there were 92.1 males. For every 100 females age 18 and over, there were 86.8 males.

The median income for a household in the town was $25,125, and the median income for a family was $28,375. Males had a median income of $24,500 versus $20,893 for females. The per capita income for the town was $10,189. About 19.5% of families and 24.7% of the population were below the poverty line, including 30.0% of those under age 18 and 28.0% of those age 65 or over.
