= San Diego Zoo =

Zoo in San Diego, California, U.S

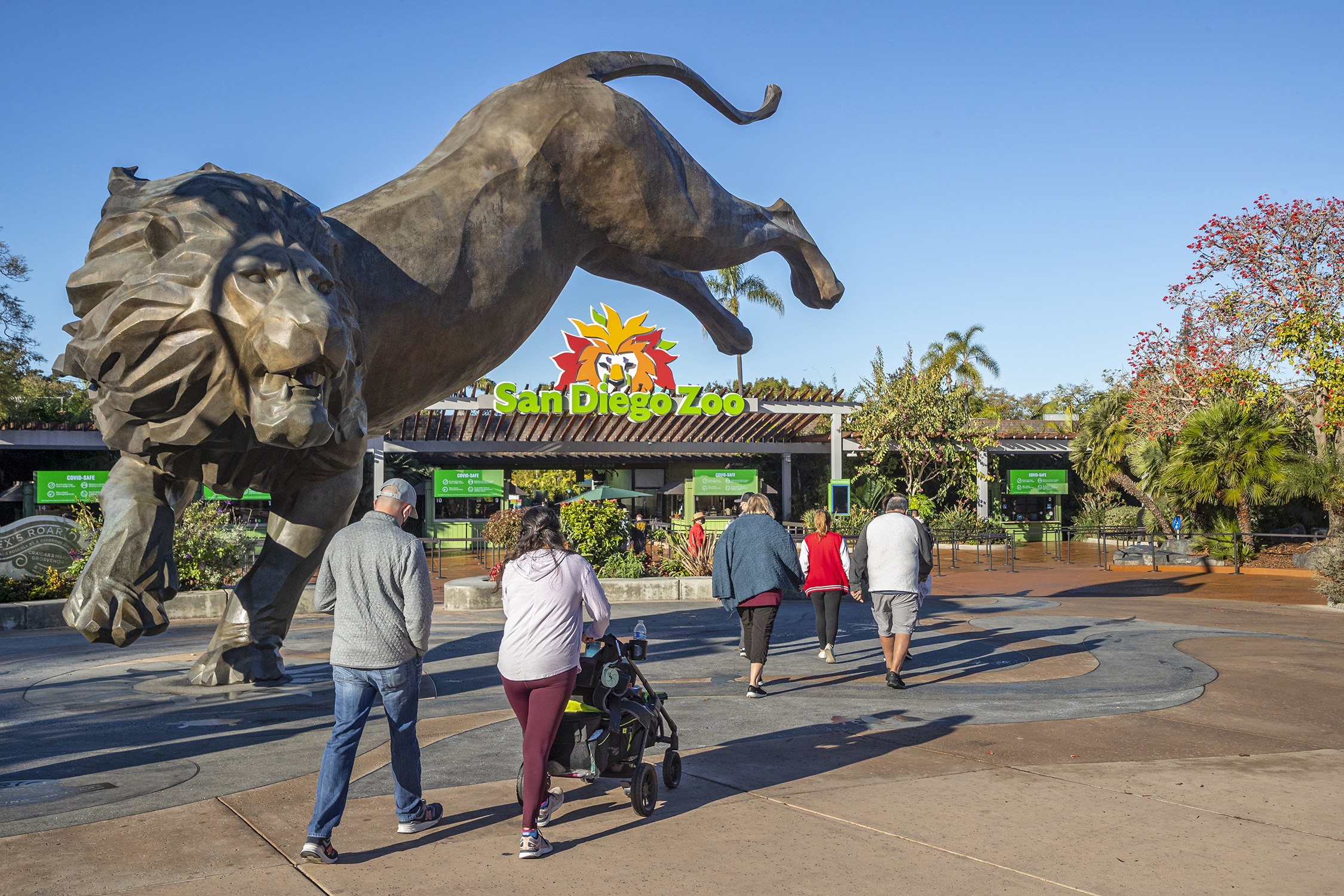
- Entrance to the zoo with sculpture Rex's Roar, after the lion that inspired the zoo
- Interactive map of San Diego Zoo
- 32°44′10″N 117°09′05″W
- Date opened: 1916 (Precursor Panama–California Exposition in previous year)
- Location: Balboa Park, San Diego, California, U.S.
- Land area: 99 acres (40 ha)
- No. of animals: 3,700+
- No. of species: 650+ (incl. subspecies)
- Annual visitors: 4 million (2018)
- Memberships: AZA, AAM, WAZA
- Major exhibits: Absolutely Apes, Wildlife Explorers Basecamp, Elephant Odyssey, Panda Ridge, Lost Forest, Monkey Trails, Polar Bear Plunge, Africa Rocks
- Public transit: San Diego Metropolitan Transit System; Bus Route 7; Rapid Bus 215
- Website: zoo.sandiegozoo.org

The San Diego Zoo is a zoo in San Diego, California, United States, located in Balboa Park. It began with a collection of animals left over from the 1915 Panama–California Exposition that were brought together by its founder, Harry M. Wegeforth. The zoo was a pioneer in the concept of open-air, cage-less exhibits that recreate natural animal habitats.

The zoo sits on 100 acres (40 ha) of land leased from the City of San Diego. It houses over 12,000 animals of more than 680 species and subspecies. It is the most visited zoo in the United States; travelers have cited it as one of the best zoos in the world.

Its parent organization, the San Diego Zoo Wildlife Alliance, is a private nonprofit conservation organization and has one of the largest zoological membership associations in the world. The San Diego Zoo Wildlife Alliance also operates the San Diego Zoo Safari Park.

== History ==
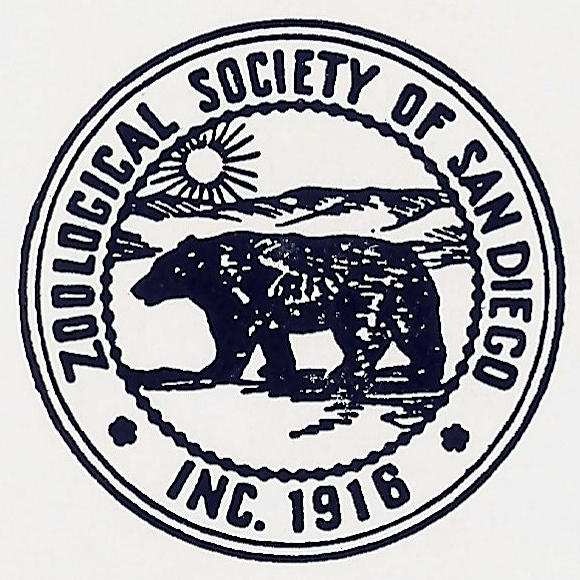
First official seal of the Zoological Society of San Diego

The San Diego Zoo grew out of exotic animal exhibitions abandoned after the 1915 Panama–California Exposition. Harry M. Wegeforth founded the Zoological Society of San Diego, meeting October 2, 1916, which initially followed precedents set by the New York Zoological Society at the Bronx Zoo. He served as president of the society until 1941.

"Wouldn't it be wonderful to have a zoo in San Diego? I believe I'll build one."

— Harry M. Wegeforth, after hearing a lion roar at the 1915 Panama–California Exposition

A permanent tract of land in Balboa Park was set aside in August 1921; on the advice of the city attorney, it was agreed that the city would own all the animals and the zoo would manage them. The zoo began to move in the following year. In addition to the animals from the exposition, the zoo acquired a menagerie from the defunct Wonderland Amusement Park. Ellen Browning Scripps financed a fence around the zoo so that it could begin charging an entrance fee to offset costs. The publication ZooNooz commenced in early 1925.

Animal collector Frank Buck went to work as director of the San Diego Zoo on June 13, 1923, signed to a three-year contract by Wegeforth. William T. Hornaday, director of the Bronx Zoo, had recommended Buck for the job, but Buck quickly clashed with the strong-willed Wegeforth and left the zoo after three months to return to animal collecting.

After several other zoo directors, Wegeforth appointed the zoo's bookkeeper, Belle Benchley, to the position of executive secretary, in effect zoo director; she was given the actual title of zoo director a few years later. She served as zoo director from 1925 until 1953. For most of that time she was the only female zoo director in the world. She was succeeded as director by Dr. Charles Schroeder.

In October 1938, the zoo made ongoing national news, when, under the direction of Belle Benchley, it arranged to have two three-year old giraffes, later named Lofty and Patches, transported from British East Africa via freighter, where during their 54 days at sea they were caught in the Hurricane of 1938. The giraffes were then kept for 16 days at the U.S. Animal Quarantine Station in Athenia, New Jersey and driven cross-country over 14 days via the nascent Lee Highway on a specially customized 1938 International D-40 truck — to the zoo in San Diego. The quarantine station, the giraffes, the highway, the zoo and Benchley featured prominently in the 2019 novel, West With Giraffes. Lofty and Patches died in 1959 and 1962, respectively, both due to old age.

The San Diego Zoo was a pioneer in building "cageless" exhibits. Wegeforth was determined to create moated exhibits from the start, and the first lion area at the San Diego Zoo without enclosing wires opened in 1922.

Until the 1960s, admission for children under 16 was free, regardless of whether they were accompanied by a paying adult.

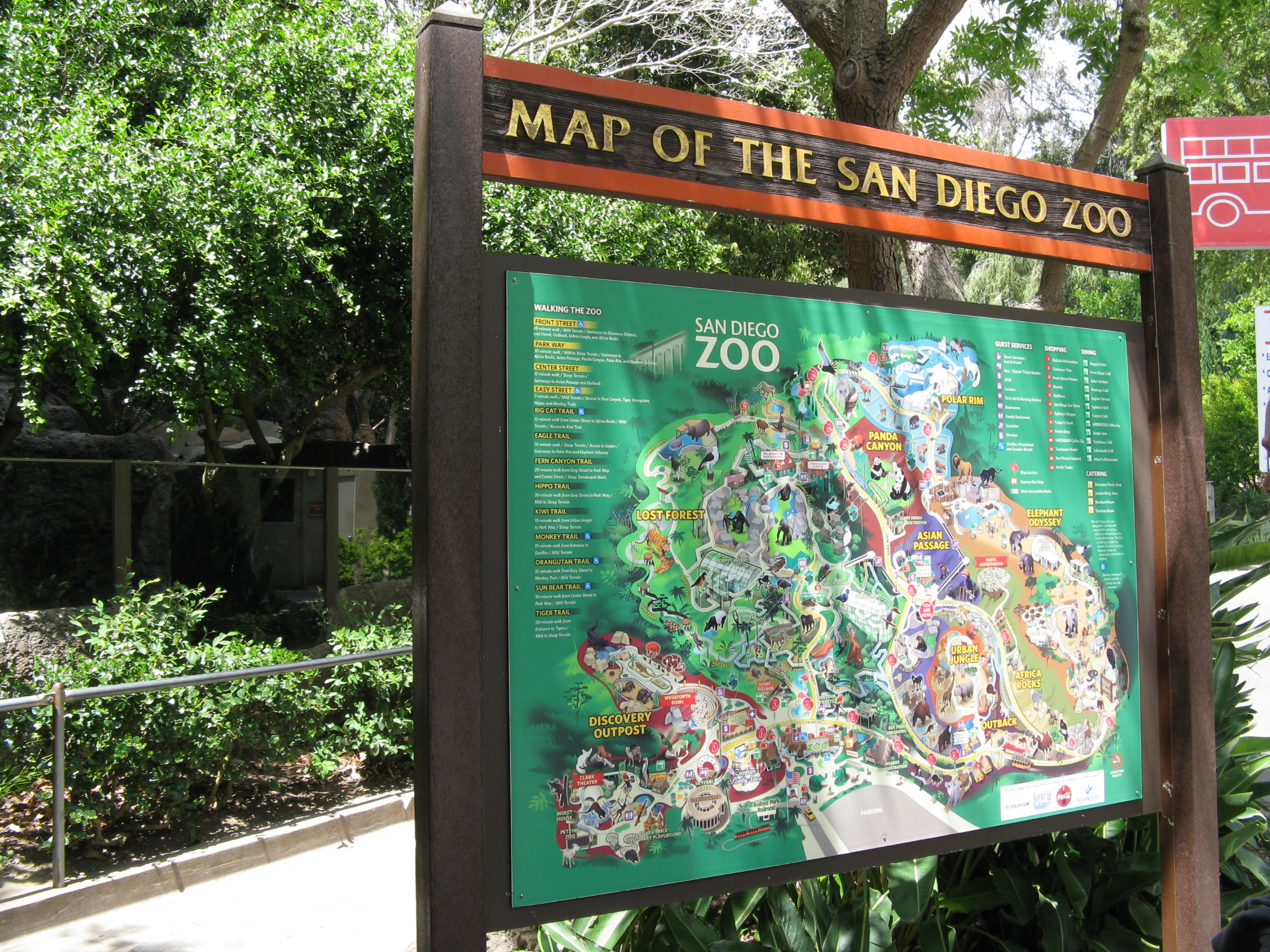
Map of the zoo

The zoo's Center for Reproduction of Endangered Species (CRES) was founded in 1975 at the urging of Kurt Benirschke, who became its first director. In 2005, CRES was renamed the Division of Conservation and Research for Endangered Species under newly appointed director Allison Alberts to better reflect its mission. In 2009, CRES was significantly expanded to become the Institute for Conservation Research.

The world's only albino koala in a zoological facility was born September 1, 1997, at the San Diego Zoo and was named Onya-Birri, which means "ghost boy" in an Australian Aboriginal language. The San Diego Zoo has the largest number of koalas outside of Australia.

In 2014, a colony of African penguins arrived for the first time in the zoo since 1979. They have since moved into Africa Rocks when it opened in 2017.

In 2016, Baba, the last pangolin on display in North America at the time, died at the zoo.

=== Escapes ===
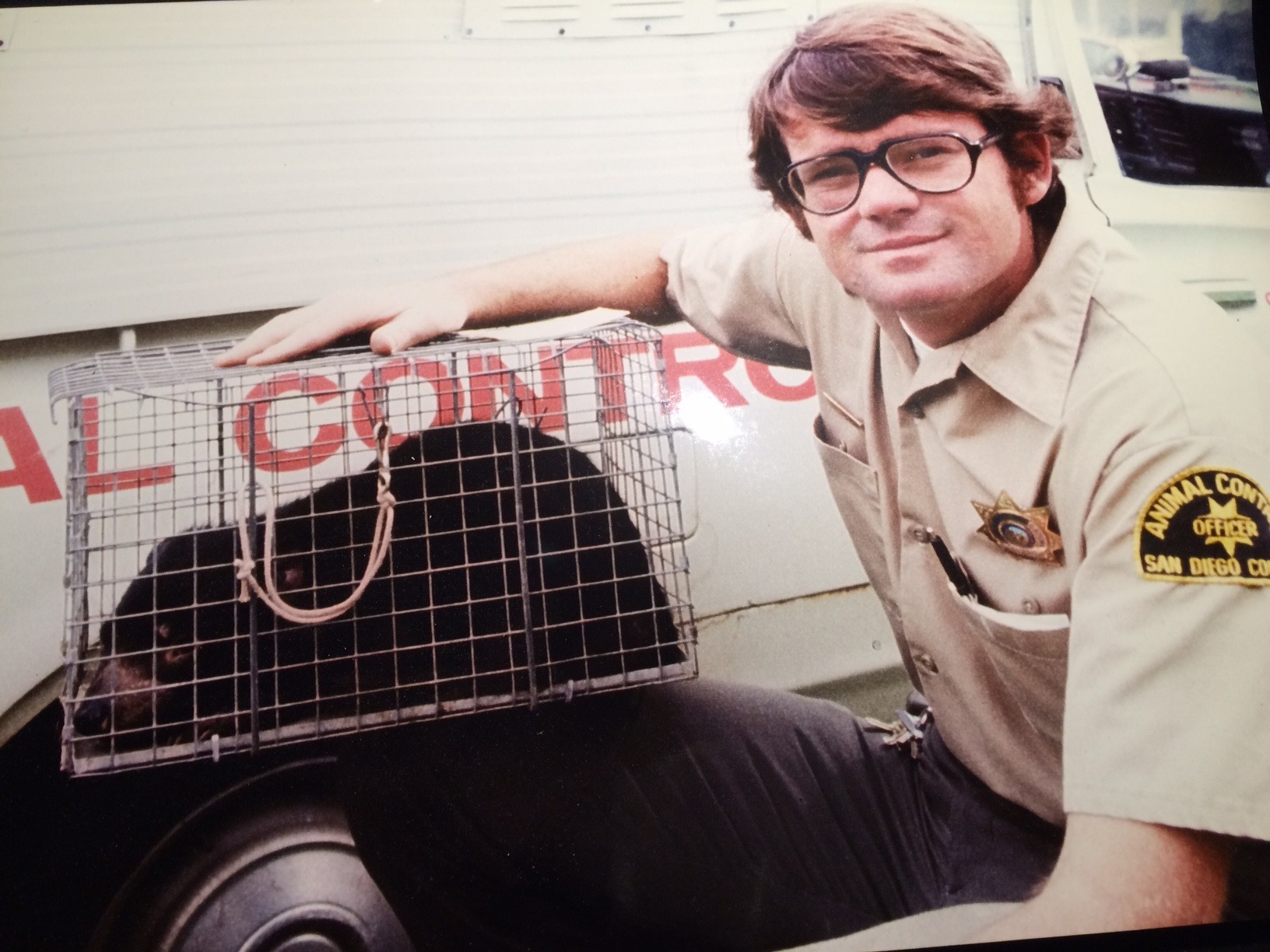
San Diego County Animal Control Officer, Tom Van Wagner, with Tasmanian devil he captured after it escaped from the San Diego Zoo, 1977

The San Diego Zoo has had several notable escapees through the years; one of which being Ken Allen, a Bornean orangutan who came to be known as "the hairy Houdini", for his many escapes.

In 1940, a Malayan Tapir managed to escape several times, earning it the nickname "Terrible Trudy".

In March 2013, the zoo, which was hosting a private party at the time, had to initiate a lockdown when two striped hyenas got past their barriers. They were captured and brought to the zoo's veterinary clinic following sedation.

In 2014, a koala named Mundu escaped to a neighboring tree just outside the Koalafornia Australia Outback enclosure. Zookeepers captured him once the park closed that day.

In early 2015, two Wolf's guenons escaped their enclosure. One of the monkeys neared a fence line off of Route 163, but was brought back to safety without injury.

On January 29, 2023 a female red panda reportedly escaped her enclosure for a total of six hours before being led back to her enclosure. The San Diego Zoo is currently breeding the red pandas due to their status being labeled endangered on the IUCN Red List; there are thought to be fewer than 10,000 left in the world.

== Features ==
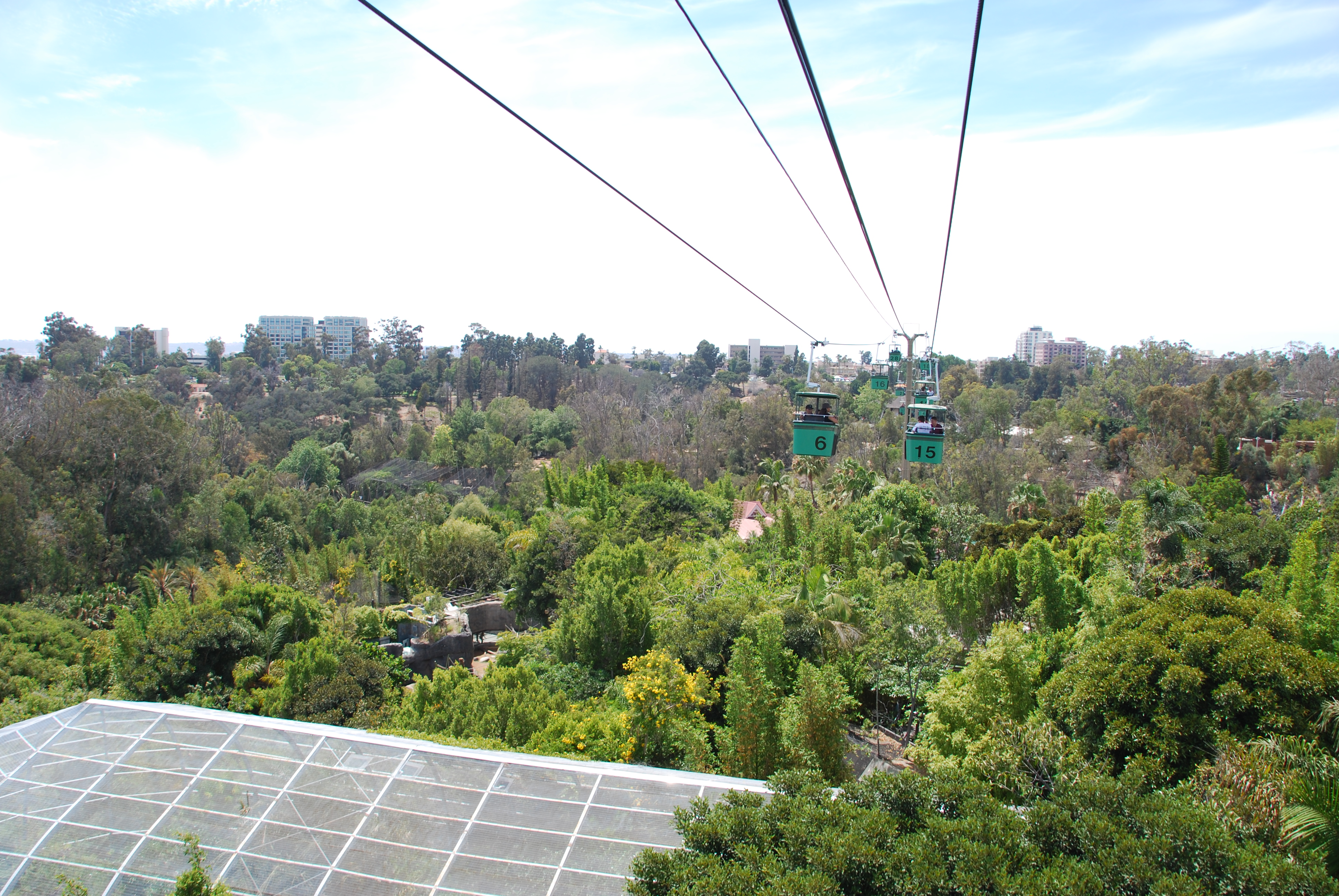
Skyfari gondolas provide an aerial view of the zoo

The zoo offers a guided tour bus that traverses 75% of the park. There is also an overhead gondola lift called the Skyfari, providing an aerial view of the zoo. The Skyfari was built in 1969 by the Von Roll tramway company of Bern, Switzerland. The San Diego Zoo Skyfari is a Von Roll type 101.

Exhibits at the zoo are often designed around a particular habitat. The same exhibit may feature many different animals that can be found side by side in the wild, along with native plant life. Exhibits range from an African rain forest (featuring gorillas) to the Arctic taiga and tundra in the summertime (featuring polar bears). Some of the largest free-flight aviaries in existence are here, including the Owens Aviary and the Scripps Aviary. Many exhibits are "natural", with invisible wires and darkened blinds (to view birds), and accessible pools and open-air moats (for large mammals).

The San Diego Zoo also operates the San Diego Zoo Safari Park (formerly the San Diego Wild Animal Park), a nearly 2000-acre park located 30 miles northeast of the Zoo near Escondido, which features animals in more expansive, open areas than the San Diego Zoo's 100 acres can provide. Exhibits are themed mainly around Asia, Africa, and Australia. The San Diego facilities actively exchange animals with other zoos around the world, in accordance with Species Survival Plan (SSP) recommendations.

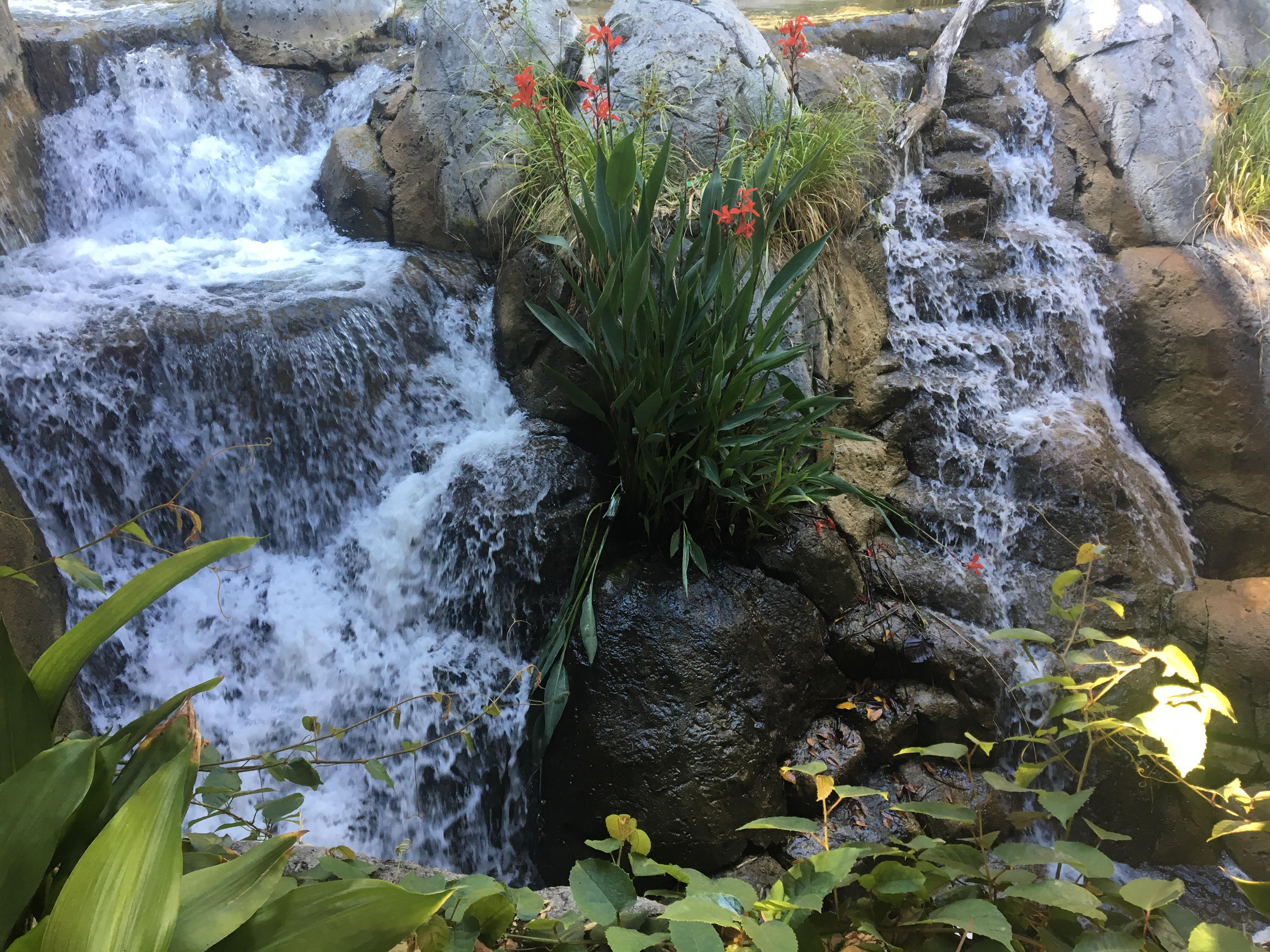
An example of one of the thousands of plants taken care of at the San Diego Zoo

San Diego has one of the world's largest and most diverse animal collections; however, the total number of animal species in the collection has been reduced somewhat over the past two decades (2000–2020), from around 860 to approximately 650. This comes as exhibits are redeveloped into more spacious, naturalistic areas, and as several animals are transitioned to the Safari Park.

The temperate, sunny maritime climate of southern California is well suited to many plants and animals. The zoo is also an accredited botanical garden; the botanical collection includes more than 700,000 exotic plants. As part of its gardening effort, some rare animal foods are grown at the zoo. For example, 40 varieties of bamboo were raised for the pandas when they were at the zoo on long-term loan from China. It also maintains 18 varieties of eucalyptus trees to feed its koalas.

Keepers and most other employees at the San Diego Zoo are members of Teamsters Union Local 481.

== Exhibits ==
=== Monkey Trail and Forest Tales ===
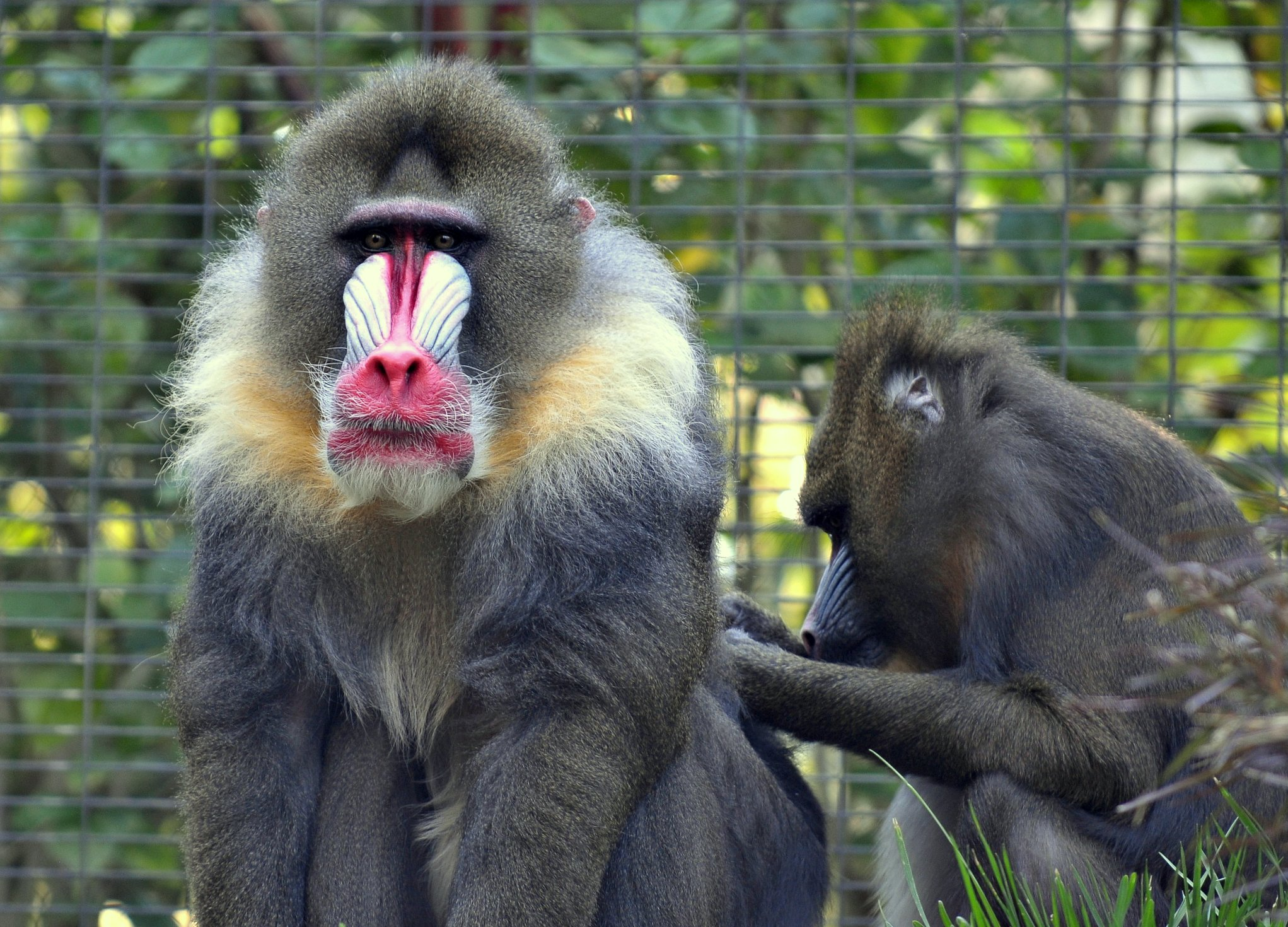
Mandrill, world's largest species of monkey, at the zoo

Monkey Trails showcases primates and other animals native to the tropical rainforests of Asia and Africa. Opening in 2005, it replaced a decades-old area of exhibits known as Ape and Bird Mesa. These were some of the oldest animal "houses" still in use (at the time) at the San Diego Zoo, being built in the 1930s, with little to no change until the demolition of Monkey Trails. In addition to a few small bird aviaries and a troop of siamang apes living on a treehouse in the center of a pond, the site was centered around two square buildings; these plain structures contained many small exhibits lined up, one after another, on all four sides. One of the buildings was focused on monkeys, while the other was mainly songbirds, parrots, and tropical avian species. There had been a few efforts at landscaping these cages; however, the monkeys notably lived in bleak, "prison-cell" like cages. Several Zoo members and guests left comments over the years regarding the exhibits and their lack of plant life, the (apparent) lack of enrichment for the monkeys, and, mostly, the appearance of cement "cell blocks" as exhibits.

Monkey Trails is home primarily to monkeys such as the Angola colobus, tufted capuchin, De Brazza's monkey, lesser spot-nosed monkey, Black mangabey, Wolf's mona monkey, and mandrill. There is also a pair of pygmy hippopotamus named Elgon and Mabel, who share their underwater-viewing pond with a large school of African cichlids and tilapia. On April 9, 2020, Mabel gave birth to Akobi, a male calf. His birth marked the first pygmy hippo born at the zoo in nearly thirty years.

Throughout the walking paths, visitors can also see West African slender-snouted crocodiles, different reptiles, and various African freshwater fish; these different animals live in a series of densely-planted paludarium- and riparium-style exhibits, complete with thick glass panels for close-up animal encounters. Monkey Trails utilized a newer concept for the displaying of arboreal animals; by making the exhibits two storeys high, with stairs, walkways, and elevators for access, the habits of animals can be observed from ground level as well as from the treetops. Some of the horticultural highlights of Monkey Trails include several massive Banyan fig (Ficus) trees (viewable in public areas as well as in animal exhibits), cycads, and a bog garden with Sarracenia, Drosera, Venus flytraps and other carnivorous plants.

=== Owens Aviary ===
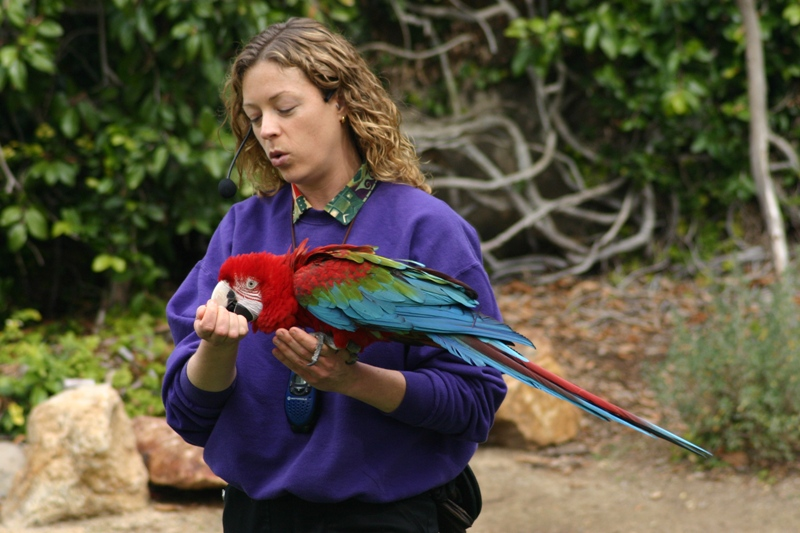
Red-and-green macaw (Ara chloropterus) with bird handler

The Owens Aviary contains about 200 individual tropical birds from around 45 species, mainly from Australasia, Oceania, and Papua New Guinea. The aviary is built onto the side of an approx. 60' high canyon wall, being accessible via an entry/exit at the uppermost level and another at the lower end of the aviary (essentially the canyon floor). The walkway inside the aviary connects these entryways as it ascends and descends with the natural slope. The naturally steep location proves to be perfect for the exhibit's waterfall, which cascades downhill through the aviary before splashing down into a large pond. The ambient white noise of the waterfall is quite noticeable, but relaxing and tranquil, rather than very loud. The waterfall churns up mist, and cool steam fills the aviary with ambient humidity; additionally, the outside of the structure is painted a dark green color, which helps to block any excess sunlight from penetrating inside. This further gives visitors the feeling of walking through a lush, dense jungle.

The entire aviary is lushly landscaped and thick with palms, ficus, Araceae species (such as Monstera deliciosa and Thaumatophyllum), Clivia sp., ferns and many more varieties. The varied collection of bird life includes the Chinese hwamei, eclectus parrot, black-naped fruit doves, common emerald doves, red-billed leiothrix, Victoria crowned pigeons, Bali mynas, Nicobar pigeons, the blue-crowned laughingthrush, white-rumped shamas, the maleo, Himalayan monal, Indian peafowl, and great argus pheasants.

=== Scripps Aviary ===
The Scripps Aviary was built in 1923 and is home to many colorful birds from Africa such as the violet-backed starling, African gray parrots, blue-bellied rollers, tambourine doves, great blue turacos, hamerkops, superb starlings, black-headed weavers, white-headed buffalo weavers, white-faced whistling ducks, African spoonbills, Madagascar crested ibises and southern bald ibises.

=== Parker Aviary ===
The Parker Aviary houses various birds from South America including Andean cock-of-the-rocks, blue-crowned motmots, blue-headed macaws, crested oropendola, Inca terns, keel-billed toucans, ringed teals, sunbitterns and toco toucans as well as golden lion tamarins. It is situated next to a complex of 20 smaller aviaries previously known as Wings of Australasia, exhibiting tropical birds from Southeast Asia and the Pacific. San Diego Zoo has the largest collection of birds in North America. Together the zoo and San Diego Zoo Safari Park hold America's most diverse collection of hornbills, with 15 species displayed in 2014.

=== Asian Passage ===
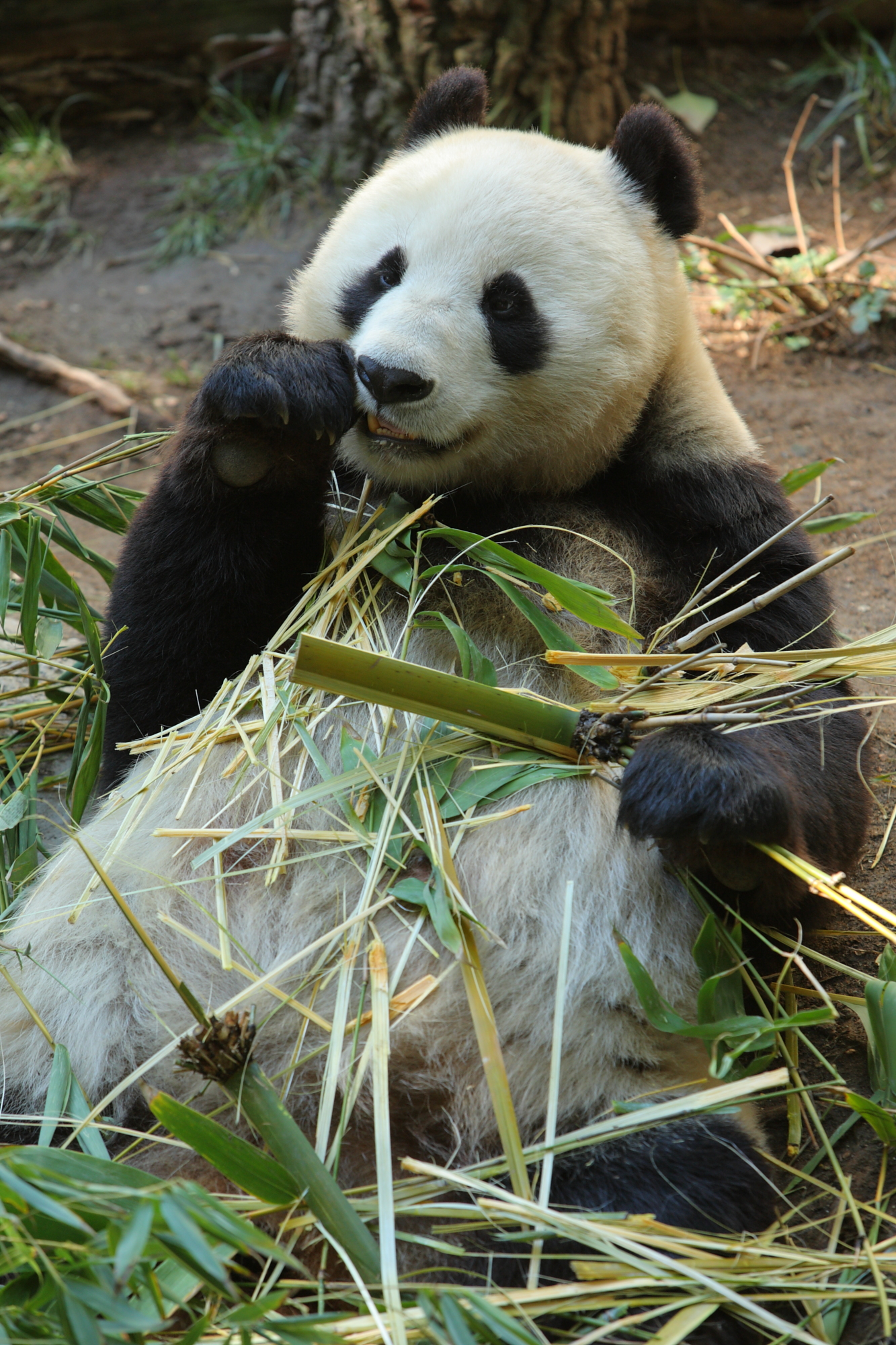
Bai Yun the giant panda

The San Diego Zoo had been one of four zoos in the U.S. that had giant pandas on display and had been the most successful in terms of panda reproduction. The first two giant panda cubs in U.S. history to have been born in the U.S. and survive into adulthood—Hua Mei (female, born to Bai Yun and Shi Shi) and Mei Sheng (male, born to Bai Yun and Gao Gao)—were born at the zoo, in 1999 and 2003, respectively. After that, three more giant panda cubs—Su Lin and Zhen Zhen (both females) and Yun Zi (male)—were born to the resident giant panda parents Bai Yun and Gao Gao. Xiao Liwu (meaning "little gift"), was born on July 29, 2012, and was let outside for visitors to see on January 9, 2013. By 2015, all of the cubs had been sent back to China to participate in the breeding program there.

By April 2019, the giant panda exhibit had closed. The pandas in the enclosure had been repatriated to China after successfully serving its conservation mission. Since the closing of Panda Trek, the exhibit had been repurposed to display other Chinese animals, including golden takins, red pandas, Mang Mountain pit vipers, Amur leopards, snow leopards and an exhibit comparing several types of bamboo.

In November 1984, the Chinese Wildlife Protection Association, the Ministry of Urban and Rural Construction and Environmental Protection, the Ministry of Forestry, and the Chengdu Zoo formed a Chinese delegation to the United States to carry a pair of Sichuan snub-nosed monkeys to the San Diego Zoo for a 13-day exhibition of snub-nosed monkeys. This was the first time that golden snub-nosed monkeys were exhibited abroad.

In November 2023, General Secretary of the Chinese Communist Party Xi Jinping hinted at the return of giant pandas to the zoo as a "gesture that China is ready to continue cooperation with the U.S. on panda conservation." In June 2024, a pair of pandas, named Yun Chuan and Xin Bao, were loaned to the zoo. The two giant pandas made their debut at the San Diego Zoo on August 8, 2024.

On August 8, 2024, the San Diego Zoo opened up the Panda Ridge habitat that showed off the two new giant pandas, Yun Chuan and Xin Bao. The habitat replicates China’s forests, caretakers often supply the pandas with bamboo grown at the San Diego Zoo Safari Park. The California Governor Gavin Newsom was at the grand opening of the habitat and named August 8th California Panda Day.

=== Urban Jungle ===
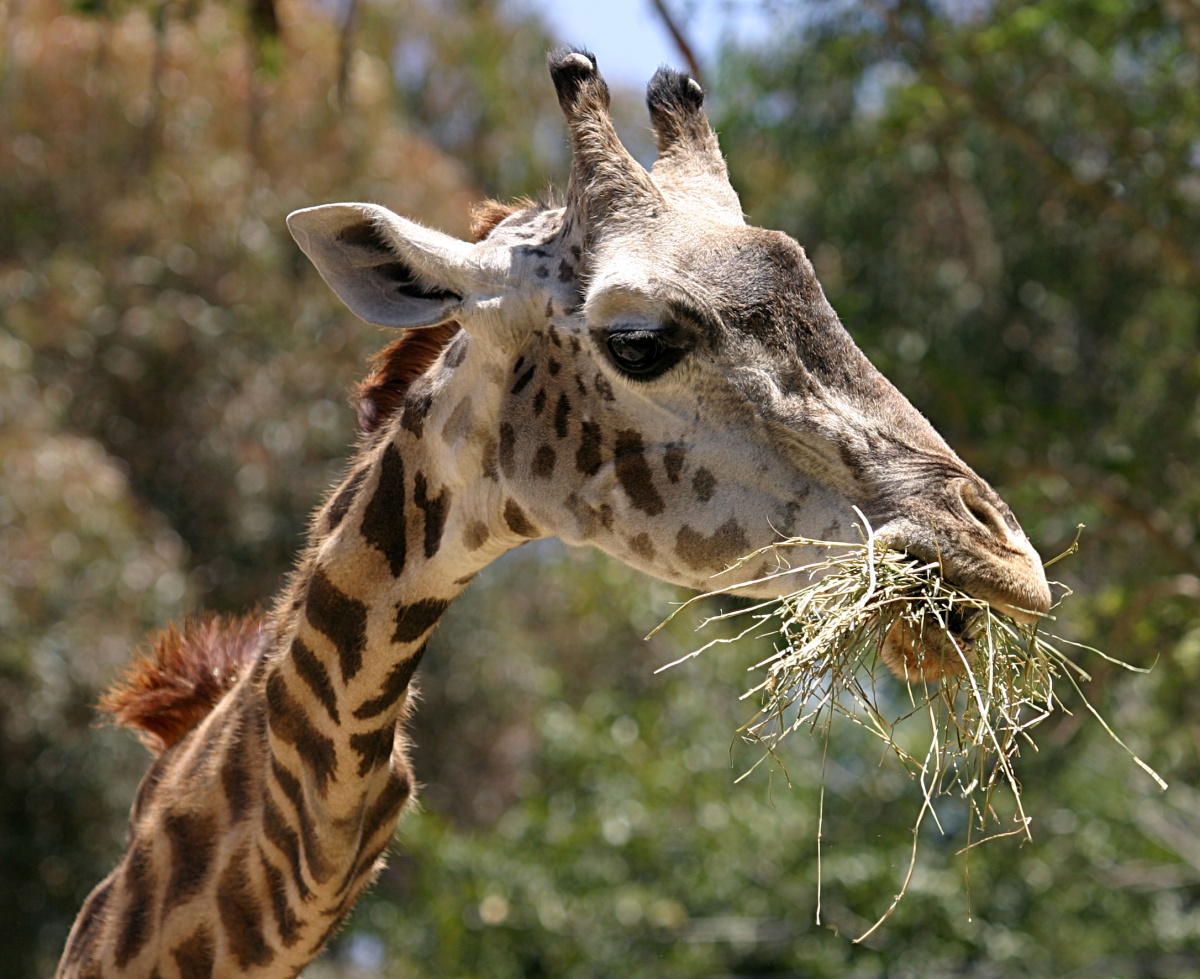
Masai giraffe

The Urban Jungle houses different animals including a herd of five Masai giraffes (including a calf born on July 4, 2025), Soemmerring's gazelles, American flamingoes, a Grant's zebra, a miniature donkey and a male Indian rhinoceros named Maza. Many of the Zoo's animal ambassadors live there including a binturong, southern ground hornbills, red kangaroos, fennec foxes, South African cheetahs and Cape porcupines.

=== Polar Bear Plunge ===
Polar Bear Plunge, which opened in 1996, and was renovated in March 2010, houses over 30 species representing the Arctic. The main animals in the area are the two female polar bears, named Chinook and Tatqiq. More animals that make their home in the Plunge include reindeer, arctic foxes, raccoons, eurasian lynx and an underwater viewing area is available to observe the polar bears swimming in their 130,000-US-gallon (490,000 L) pool.

Farther down the path lies an aviary with several species of diving ducks. Some of the horticultural highlights include giant redwood trees, many different pine trees, and manzanita.

Just up the path of Polar Bear Plunge is Northwest Passage, housing mountain lions, maned wolves, giant anteaters, Patagonian maras, gerenuk, bontebok, tufted deer, Grévy's zebras, musk deer, Cuvier's gazelle, lesser kudu, Speke's gazelles, Chacoan Peccarys, as well as the Eagle Canyon, home to Andean condors, harpy eagles, ornate hawk eagles and Steller's sea eagles.

=== Wildlife Explorers Basecamp ===
Opened in 2022, the Wildlife Explorers Basecamp was built on the site of the historic Children's Zoo, allowing children to get closer to several animals and also includes interactive play opportunities and sculptures. There are 4 main zones in the basecamp that feature wildlife that lives in the 4 main ecosystems: Desert Dunes, Wild Woods, Marsh Meadows, and The Rainforest.

The Rainforest includes Naked Mole Rats, Goats, binturong, Burmese star tortoises, sloths, caracals, ocelots, wombats, Brazilian porcupines and southern tamanduas. Desert Dunes includes black-tailed prairie dogs, burrowing owls, and fennec foxes. Wild Woods includes squirrel monkeys and coatis.

==== Hummingbird Habitat ====
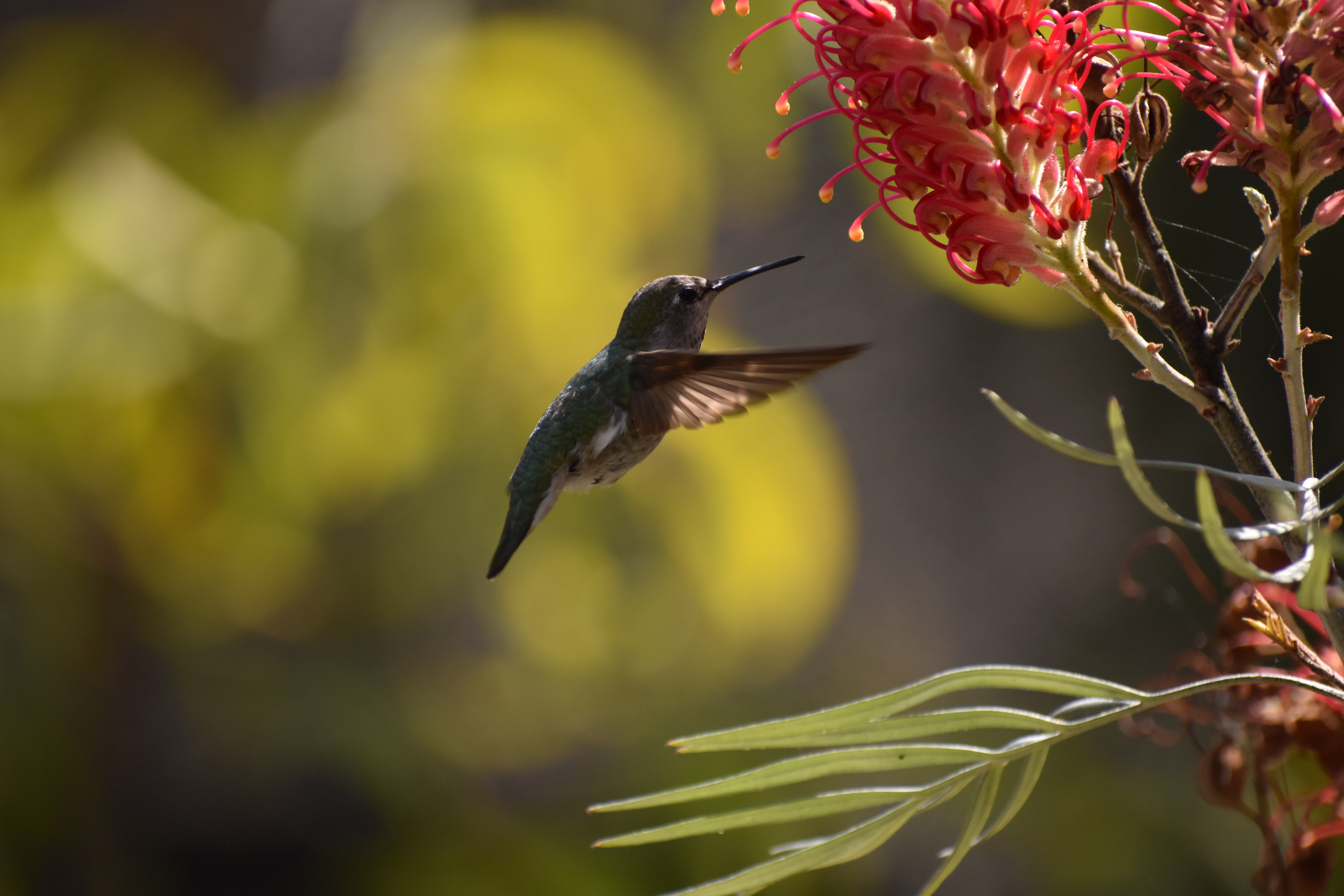
Anna's hummingbird (Calypte anna) at the zoo

A small aviary that, as of July 2022, includes three species of hummingbirds, the Anna's, Costa's, and Amazilia hummingbirds, along with other birds from South America such as bananaquits, crested quail-doves, golden-collared manakins, blue-necked tanagers, green-backed trogons, opal-rumped tanagers, paradise tanagers, swallow tanagers, turquoise tanagers, screaming pihas, violaceous euphonias, green honeycreepers, purple honeycreepers, red pileated finches, spangled cotingas and pompadour cotingas. Guests can view the birds from an observation bridge, and the aviary also includes a cenote pool. Wattled jacanas can also be seen in the aviary.

==== Spineless Marvels ====
The McKinney Spineless Marvels features naked mole-rats and a large invertebrate collection consisting of Central American giant cave cockroaches, Madagascar hissing cockroaches, leafcutter ants, Goliath beetles, giant dead leaf mantises, ghost mantises, two-spotted assassin bugs, giant African millipedes, giant desert hairy scorpions, golden silk orb-weavers, Antilles pinktoe tarantulas, Brazilian black tarantulas, Mexican fireleg tarantulas, golden-eyed stick insects, goliath stick insects, jungle nymphs, thorny devil stick insects and western honey bees.

==== Cool Critters ====
This two-story building houses fish, invertebrates, reptiles and amphibians. Some of the species housed here are axolotl, Chinese giant salamanders, Cuvier's dwarf caimans, Fiji banded iguana, leopard geckos, Indonesian blue-tongued skinks, common chuckwallas, yellow-spotted river turtles, freshwater angelfish, giant danios, pinktail chalceus, threadfin acara, multiple Lake Malawi cichlids, South American lungfish and sunburst diving beetles.

==== Reptile Walk ====
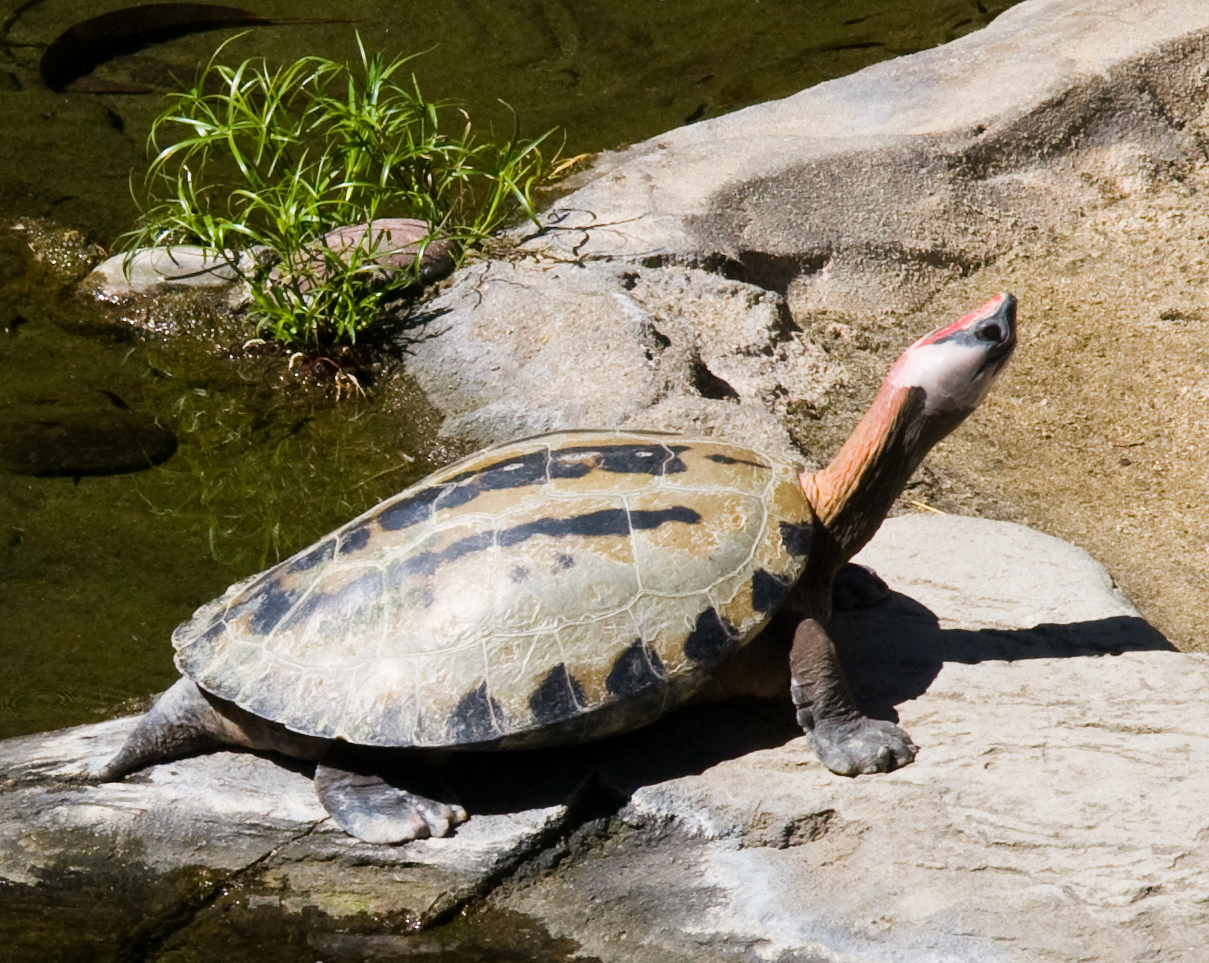
A turtle, Callagur borneoensis, stretching its neck at the zoo

Previously called Reptile Mesa, the Reptile Walk houses small outdoor yards, one housing European species like European pond turtles, marginated tortoises, scheltopusiks and ocellated lizards while the other contains African species, radiated tortoises, Sudan plated lizards and yellow-throated plated lizards. Nearby is the Komodo Kingdom, a new exhibit for the zoo's Komodo dragons.

Walking down the path leads to a building split in two. One side contains terrariums for amphibians such as the Amazon milk frog, Panamanian golden frog, brown mantella, magnificent tree frog, fire salamander, Kaiser's mountain newt and many species of poison dart frog including the dyeing poison dart frog, green and black poison dart frog, black-legged poison frog and splashback poison frog. The other side contains native Californian species like the Colorado River toad, California kingsnake, coastal rosy boa, Baja California rat snake, San Diego gopher snake and giant horned lizard.

The walkway then passes an enclosure for the endangered Chinese alligator and afterwards is a building housing turtles, including broad-shelled river turtles, Roti Island snake-necked turtles, Argentine snake-necked turtles, red-headed Amazon River turtles, Malayan snail-eating turtles, Parker's snake-necked turtles, mata mata and pig-nosed turtles.

Nearby is the gharial pond. Various turtles like Indian flapshell turtles, Indian narrow-headed softshell turtles, northern river terrapins, painted terrapins and others are also housed with the gharials.

Concluding the Reptile Walk are yards housing Asian forest tortoises, African spurred tortoises, blue iguanas, Jamaican iguanas, Galápagos tortoises and leopard tortoises.

==== Reptile House ====
This is a renowned Spanish-influence structure. As of July 2022, animals at the reptile house include Mertens' water monitors, flower snakes, Mangshan pit vipers, king cobras, Gila monsters, timber rattlesnakes, Philippine sailfin lizards, Santa Catalina Island rattlesnakes, eyelash vipers, blue-spotted tree monitors, black tree monitors, Madagascar tree boas, Mexican beaded lizards, ringed tree boas, Angolan pythons, emerald tree monitors, green tree pythons, snouted cobras, eastern diamondback rattlesnakes, shinglebacks, Mary River turtles, red-bellied short-necked turtles, fathead minnows,African bush vipers, black-headed bushmasters, Central Fijian banded iguanas, Pascagoula map turtles, philodryas baroni, Madagascar ground boas,yellow-spotted monitors,monocled cobras, banded water cobras, mangrove vipers, Gray's monitors, woma pythons, pancake tortoises, West African gaboon vipers, western green mambas, Solomon Islands skinks, puff adders, spider tortoises, simalia boeleni, bothriechis lateralis, banded rock rattlesnakes, twin-spotted rattlesnakes, western diamondback rattlesnakes, Chiapan beaded lizards, crotalus willardi, yellow-blotched palm pit vipers, Chinese crocodile lizards, and Sulawesi forest turtles. The reptile walk also houses Ethiopian mountain adders. In 2014, the San Diego Zoo became the first U.S. zoo to successfully breed Ethiopian mountain adders after the successful hatching of seven eggs.

=== Lost Forest ===
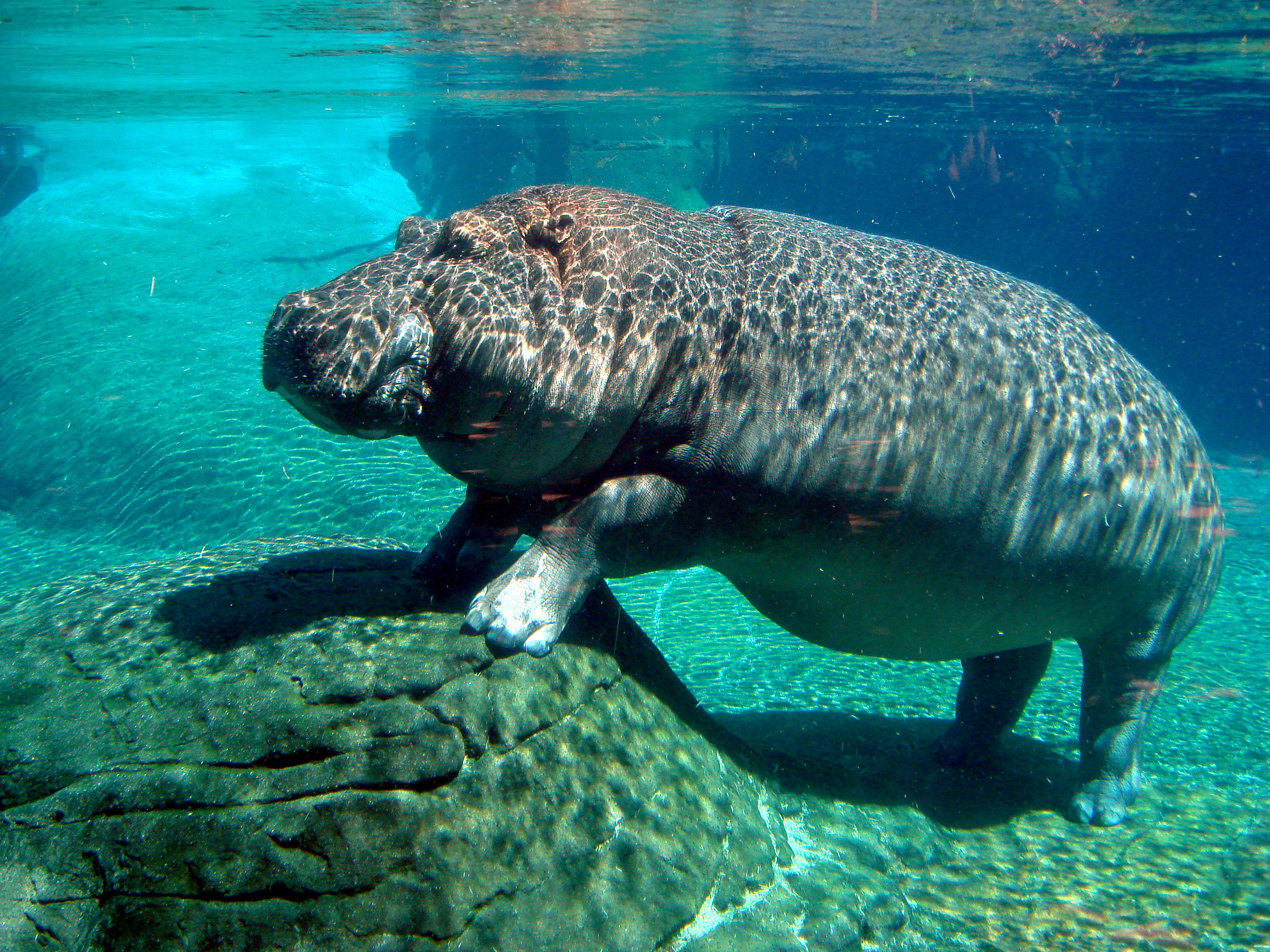
Hippopotamus at the zoo

Based upon the real Ituri Forest in the Democratic Republic of the Congo in the central part of the continent of Africa, this exhibit opened in 1999 as 'Ituri Forest' and houses different animal species from the rainforests of central Africa. The exhibit begins with a forested exhibit for okapi, black duiker, and forest buffalo, then winds past a recreation of two-leaf-covered Mbuti huts with signage about the people's customs and traditions. Next, the path leads to the hippopotamus exhibit housing three hippopotamus named Funani and her daughter Amahle, and Guadalupe, and has an underwater viewing area.

After the hippos, the path passes through a bunch of bamboo before reaching a clearing where the aviaries are located A thatched-roof gift shop and a food stand are located in a plaza near by. Immediately to the right is an exhibit with red river hogs, Allen's swamp monkeys, Red-tailed monkeys, and spotted-necked otters. The plaza leads to a bridge flanked by the red river hog exhibit on one side and an exhibit that only the monkeys and otters can access on the other. Across the bridge is a creek where the otters can swim, with viewing both above and below the water's surface. Afterwards, the path joins the rest of the zoo.

=== Elephant Odyssey ===
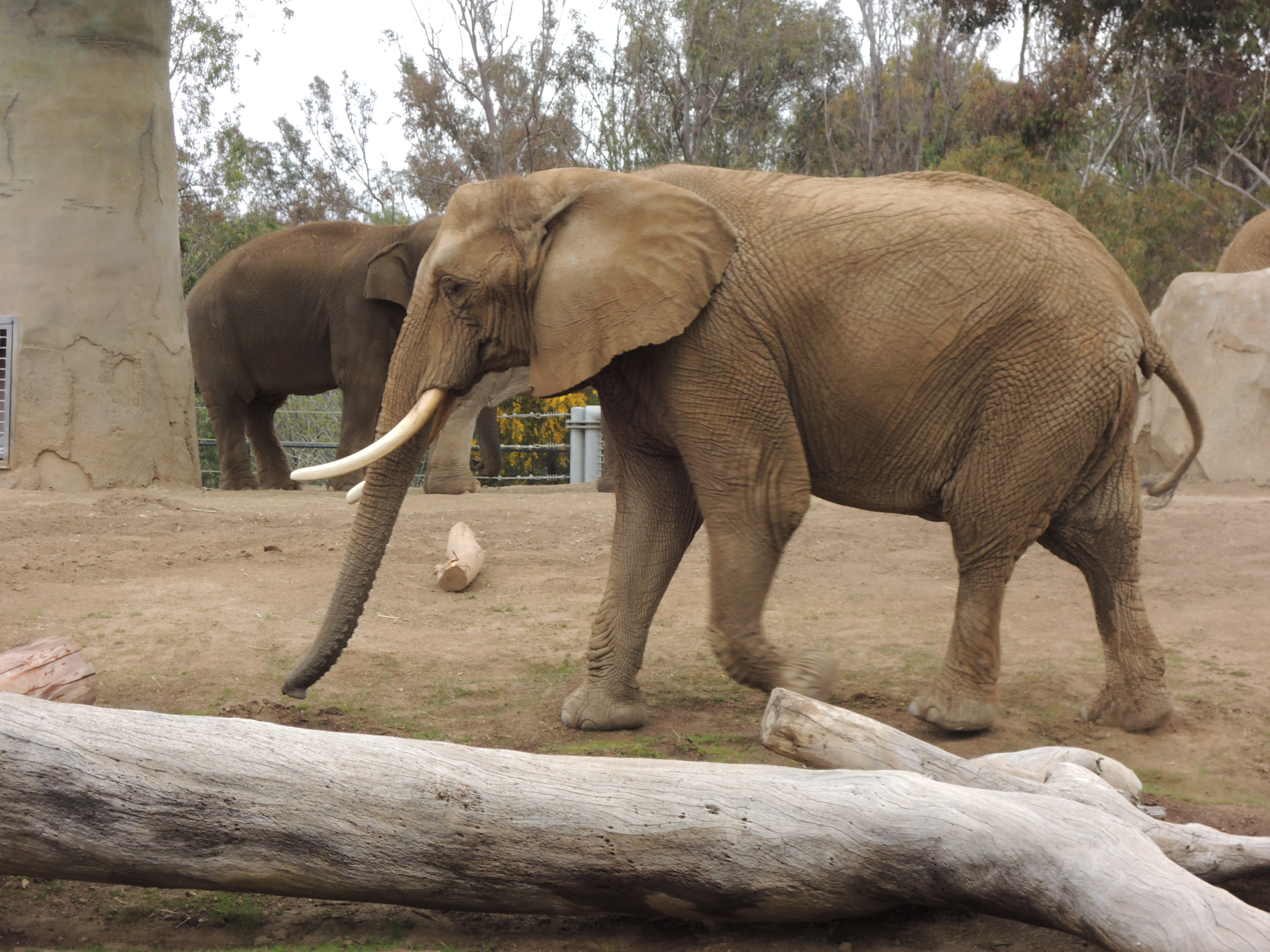
African bush elephants at the zoo

This exhibit opened on May 23, 2009, on the site of the former Hoof and Horn Mesa area. The main feature of the exhibit is the 2.5-acre (10,000 m^{2}) elephant habitat—more than three times the size of the zoo's former elephant exhibit Elephant Mesa (now the "Urban Jungle" exhibit area). Currently a herd of four, which includes one older female Shaba, and three younger males named Inhlonipho, Vus'Musi and Tsandizkle, who came from the San Diego Zoo Safari Park, Fresno Chaffee Zoo, and Reid Park Zoo respectively. Elephant Odyssey also features a glimpse of the past, with the Fossil Portal and life-size statues of ancient creatures of Southern California next to exhibits of their modern-day counterparts. The ancient life represented include the Columbian mammoth, the saber-toothed cat, the American lion, the Daggett's eagle, a Merriam's teratorn, the dwarf pronghorn, the dire wolf, the short-faced bear and the Jefferson's ground sloth.

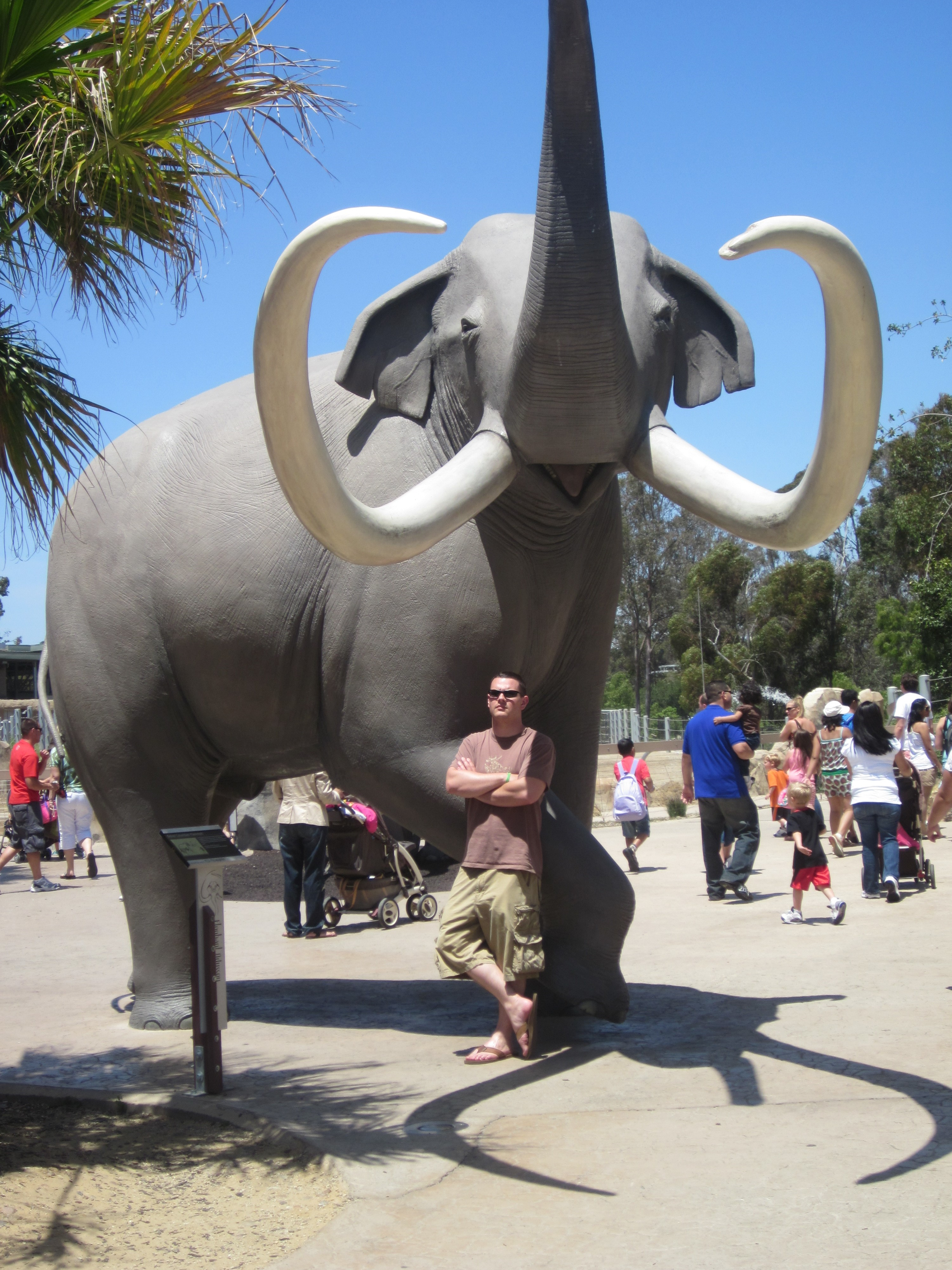
Mammoth Plaza at Elephant Odyssey

The Fossil Portal is an artificial tar pit that periodically drains to reveal man-made Pleistocene-era bones. The path turns a corner and opens up at the Mammoth Passage Plaza, with exhibits for jaguars and African lions, with a lion named Ernest and a lioness named Miss Ellen, as well as an exhibit that has houses Linnaeus's two-toed sloths to the right, and the tip of the elephant exhibit, with a large wading pool, straight ahead. The path continues to the left along with the pool, passing by the jaguar exhibit on the left. The northern end of the elephant pool drains into the mixed-species exhibit, which houses Baird's tapirs, guanacos, and capybaras. The path meets up with the elephant exhibit again before it reaches the Elephant Care Center, where visitors can watch keepers care for the pachyderms.

Next is an exhibit for secretary birds with grasses, a tree, and a statue of the extinct Daggett's eagle nearby. Afterward, the path goes down a crevasse with a wall embedded with vivaria for dung beetles. The path tunnels below the elephant exhibit to reach the other side, where it continues between the elephant exhibit and a creek for native reptiles and amphibians. Just past the source of the stream is a restaurant and gift shop, and after that are exhibits for dromedary camels, llamas, horses, & burros and another with pronghorns. Next the path splits between a playground, a rattlesnake terrarium, and a California condor aviary with artificial rock spires and a stream. The paths then reunite and join the rest of the zoo.

=== Gorilla Tropics ===
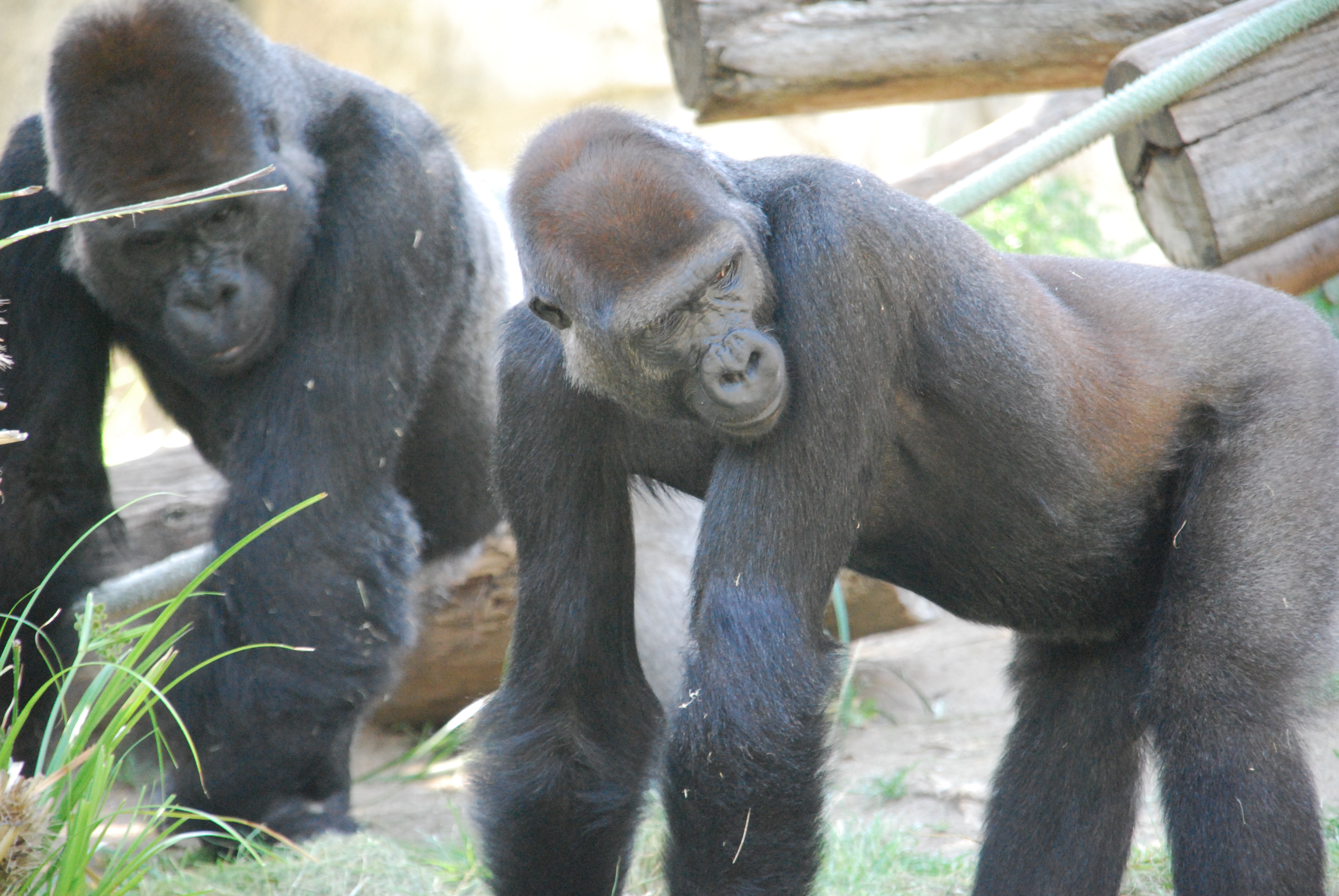
Western gorillas

Simulating the rainforests of central Africa, and opened in 1991, Gorilla Tropics has an 8,000-square-foot (740 m^{2}) enclosure for the eponymous species. The exhibit has waterfalls, a meadow, and tropical plants such as allspice, coral trees, and African tulip trees, as well as several species of bamboo.

Guests can view the three western lowland gorillas, which is a bachelor troop consisting of three males named Ekuba, Denny, and Kitoko from a viewing window, across a waterfall, and across a creek. Nearby are the bonobo habitat, an enclosure for an aviary housing crowned eagles and a small glass aviary by the bonobos housing a variety of smaller birds like exclamatory paradise whydahs, purple grenadiers, red-billed firefinches, red-cheeked cordon-bleus, zebra waxbills and more. There is also a row of other mesh aviaries which include more birds like three species of bird-of-paradise, the raggiana bird-of-paradise, magnificent bird-of-paradise, superb bird-of-paradise alongside others like Bali mynas, crested wood partridges, red-tailed black cockatoos, tricolored parrotfinch, mountain peacock-pheasants, western crowned pigeons, beautiful fruit doves, Guam kingfishers, Mindanao bleeding-hearts and blue-crowned lorikeets.

Play face expressed by an adult male gorilla playing with a juvenile gorilla.

On September 8, 2026 two gorillas, Kitoko and Matumaini, made their way to the San Diego Zoo and the San Diego Zoo Safari Park. The younger of the two, six year-old Kitoko, was transferred from Woodland Park, while the elder, thirty-three year old Matumaini, is coming from a zoo in Kansas. Both gorillas are western lowland gorillas, which are classified as critically endangered, despite having no natural predators. The gorillas are instead threatened by wildlife trafficking for illegal pet trade and loss of habitat. The gorillas’ arrivals were all a part of a survival plan program from the American Association of Zoos and Aquariums, which is a non profit organization dedicated to the advancement of zoos and aquariums in the areas of conservation, education, science, recreation, and species survival. Guests will be able to see Kitoko at the gorilla habitat in Lost Forest, while Matumaini will join Safari Park’s Gorilla Forest family troop as a silverback.

=== Absolutely Apes ===
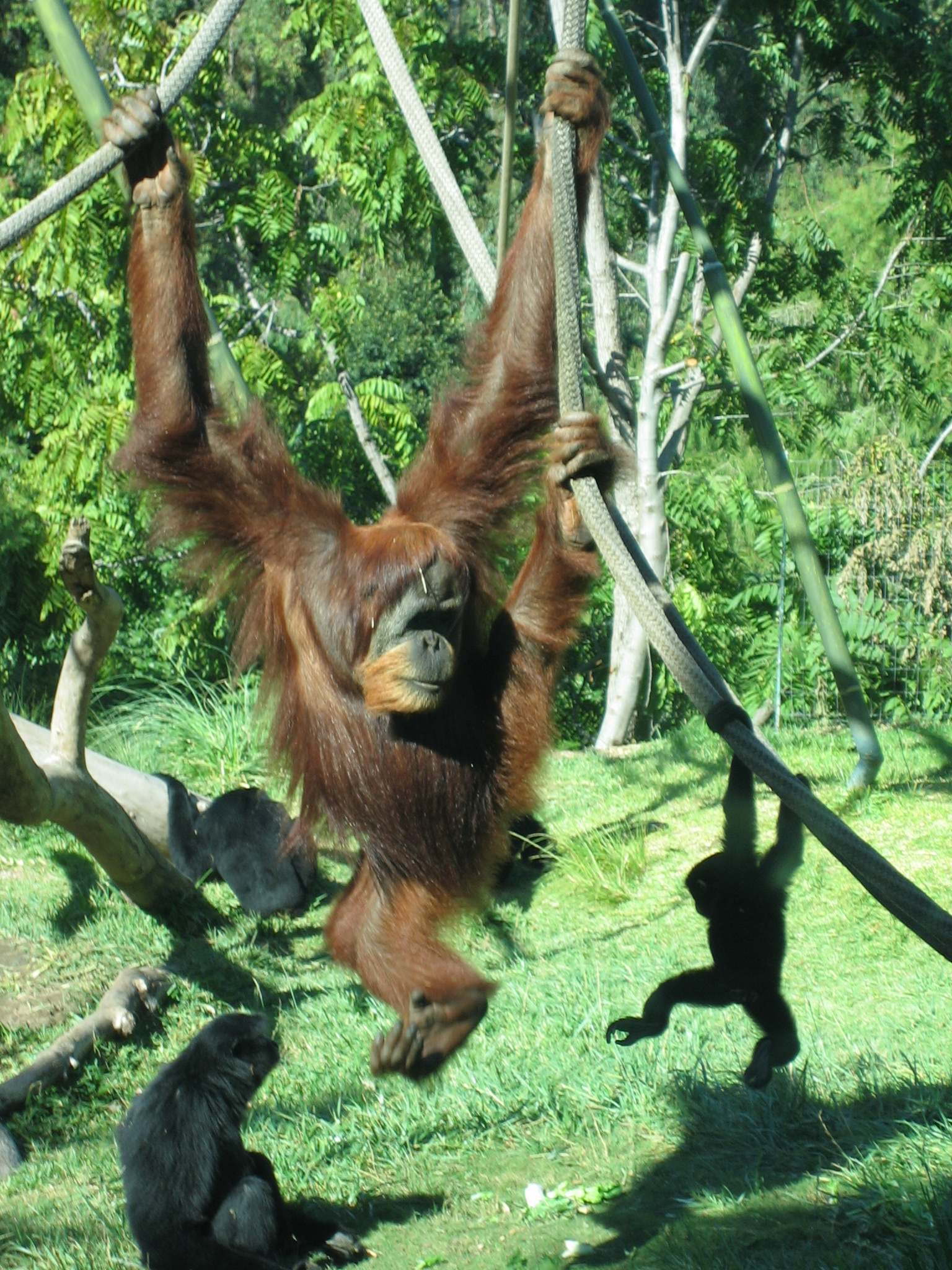
Sumatran orangutan with siamangs

This exhibit opened in 2003, as a major renovation of the former "Whittier Southeast Asian Exhibits", which had opened in 1982. It houses an adult male Sumatran orangutan, Labu, three females, Karen, Indah, and Aisha, as well as one juvenile male, Kaja. The orangutans live alongside two siamangs Eloise and her daughter Selamat in an 8,400-square-foot (780 m^{2}) exhibit, which is flanked by a 110-foot (34 m) glass viewing window.

The exhibit provides sway poles and artificial trees for the apes to swing on and a fake termite mound for them to fish condiments out of. The viewing area is designed to resemble the mulch-lined exhibit side of the viewing window by having rubber mulch, and miniature sway poles for kids. Some plant species in the exhibit are toog trees, carrotwood trees, and markhamia trees. Silvery lutungs reside in an exhibit adjacent to this area.

=== Sun Bear Forest ===
This $3.5 million exhibit opened in 1989, and exhibits Bornean sun bears, François' langurs, White-cheeked gibbons, and Aye-ayes. One end of the 1.5-acre (0.61 ha) complex houses lion-tailed macaques in a grassy exhibit with a stream and climbing ropes. The oblong sun bear exhibit straddles the path along the rest of the complex, and an aviary houses some species of birds, including Asian fairy-bluebird and Red-billed leiothrix. Farther down the path, visitors can see grizzly bears, sloth bears, spotted hyenas, spectacled bears and river otters.

=== Tiger Trail ===
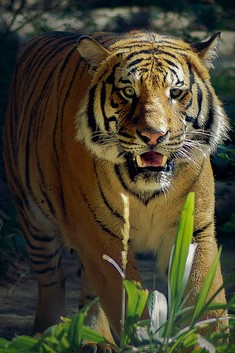
A tiger exploring a San Diego Zoo exhibit

Tiger Trail, located in a sloping canyon, opened in 1988 and houses two Malayan tiger brothers, Conner and his younger brother Berani. From the top of the canyon, It proceeds to another pavilion, this time flanked by a bunch of aviaries which feature Asian fairy-bluebirds, Baikal teals, blue-crowned laughingthrushes, Edwards's pheasants, common emerald doves, tricolored parrotfinch, red-billed leiothrix, and there are also exhibits for fishing cats and rare coconut crabs.

Farther down the canyon is an exhibit for Malayan tapirs, North Sulawesi babirusas, Indian pythons and the 1/4-acre (0.10 ha) tiger habitat, which has a hillside stream, waterfall, and glass viewing window. The Tiger Trail area of the zoo, when dedicated in 1988 as 'Tiger River', replaced an exhibit area that was known as Cascade Canyon, which had opened in 1973.

=== Outback ===
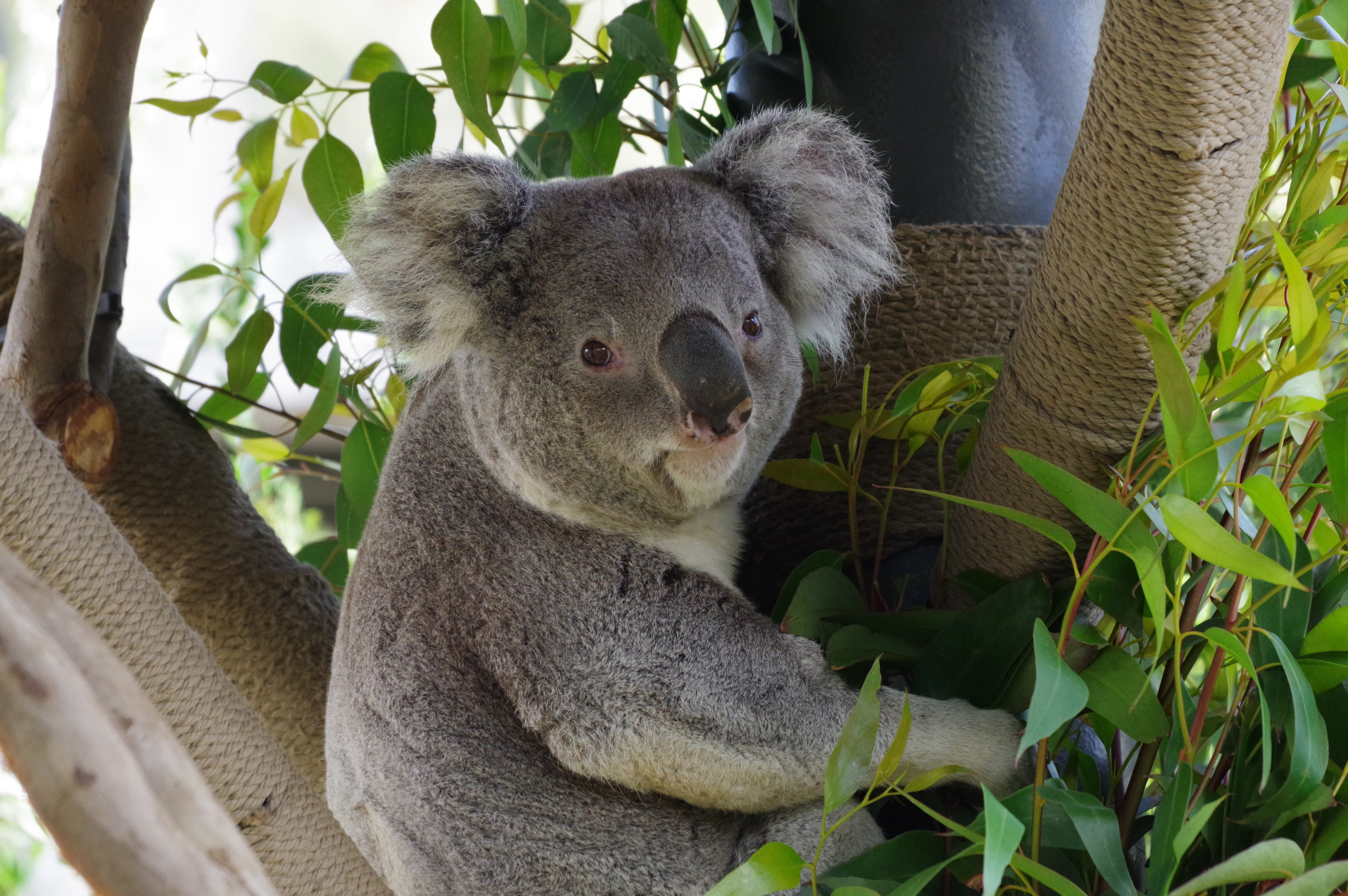
Koala at the San Diego Zoo

A new Australian Outback area, nicknamed "Koalafornia", opened in May 2013. The San Diego Zoo has over 40 koalas, the largest number in any zoo outside of Australia and the largest collection of Australian wildlife in America. It has twice as much exhibit space for koalas, including more outdoor enclosures based on a realization that koalas need sun exposure for their health.

The new area includes other Australian marsupials, such as parma wallabies, brush tailed bettongs, Goodfellow's tree-kangaroos, common ringtail possums, & short-beaked echidnas, though they are monotremes as well as Australasian birds, such as kagus, laughing kookaburras, blue-faced honeyeaters, common emerald doves, fawn-breasted bowerbirds, metallic starlings, masked lapwings, Gouldian finches and palm cockatoos. Since October 2013, the exhibit also houses Tasmanian devils, the first American zoo to do so; the animals are now kept in half a dozen zoos in the Americas as part of the Australian government's Save the Tasmanian Devil Program.

=== Africa Rocks ===
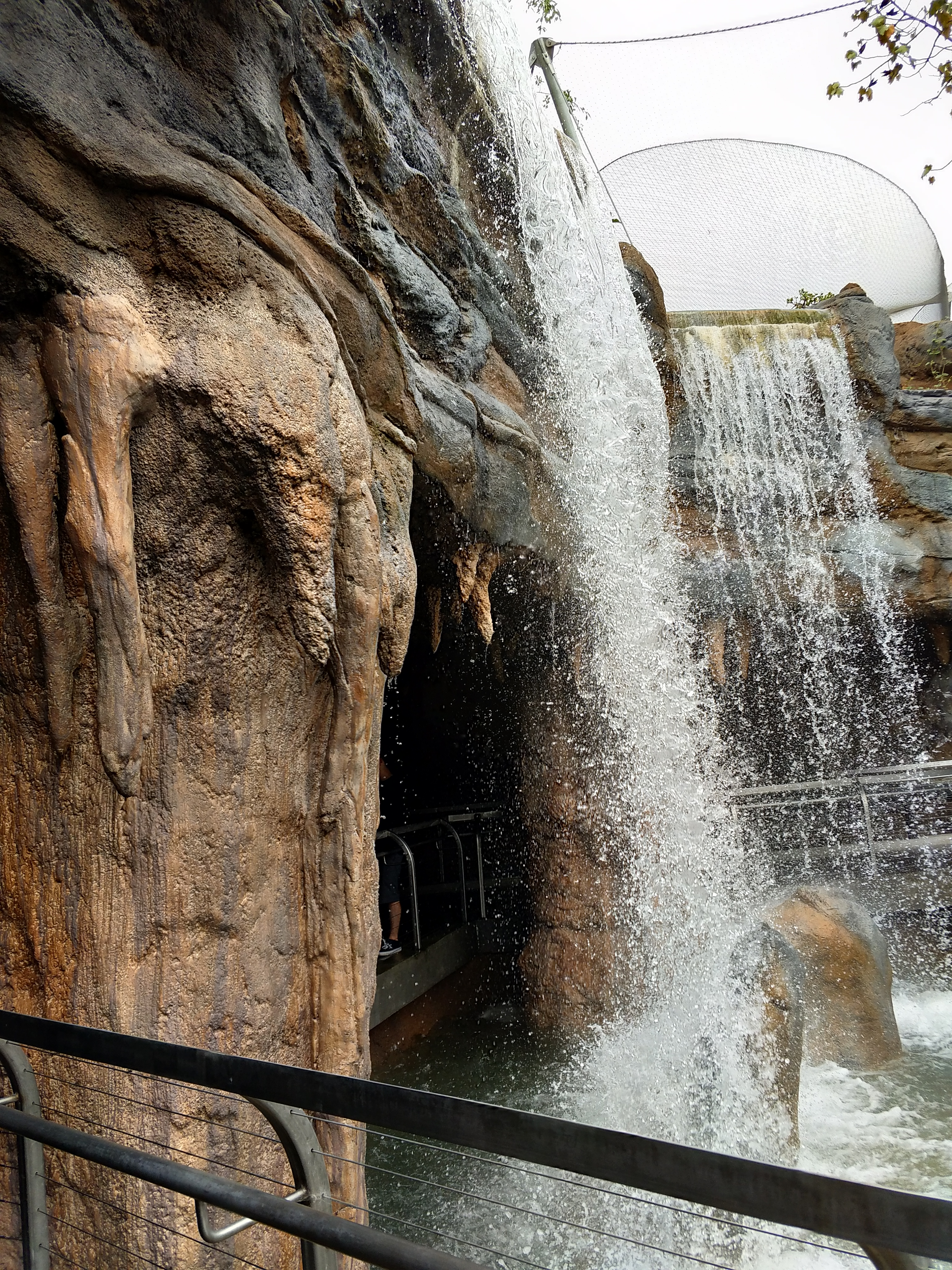
Waterfall at the Africa Rocks exhibit

Conrad Prebys's Africa Rocks highlights the biodiversity of Africa. The exhibit opened on July 1, 2017, but was not completed until December 6, 2017. The exhibit cost US$60 million to construct. The money was donated to the zoo by 3,800 donors. Africa Rocks replaced Dog and Cat Canyon, which featured grottos that were built in the 1930s.

The exhibit features the following six habitats:

==== Cape Fynbos ====
The Cape Fynbos exhibit features African penguins, an endangered species native to South Africa. The exhibit was designed to mimic the giant granite boulders that are found on Boulders Beach in South Africa, a place where these birds live. The 70 ft (21 m) long and 10 ft (3.0 m) wide habitat also includes a 200,000 US gal (757,080 L; 166,535 imp gal) pool for the penguins that stretches 170 ft (52 m), with depths up to 13 ft (4.0 m). Along with the large pool, the exhibit features a cobblestone beach and a nesting area. A group of 20 penguins moved in on June 22, 2017, to get ready for when the exhibit opened on July 1, 2017.

The penguins also share their exhibit with leopard sharks among other fish. Twelve leopard sharks arrived on June 23, 2017, from SeaWorld San Diego. The sharks were introduced to their exhibit and their penguin neighbors on Wednesday, June 28, 2017. The sharks range in age from 5 to 20. African penguins do not live alongside leopard sharks in the wild; however, they do live with similar shark species. Leopard sharks feed on crustaceans on the bottom floor and do not pose a threat to the penguins.

==== Acacia Woodland ====
The Acacia Woodland exhibit features a leopard exhibit, a troop of vervet monkeys, and an aviary. The leopard exhibit does not feature the African subspecies of leopard, but rather exhibits Amur leopards, from as far as Russia to Northern China. This is because the Amur leopard is critically endangered, as there are only around 60 individuals left in the wild. The San Diego Zoo participates in the Amur leopard Species Survival Plan, a breeding program that focuses on preserving the genetics of this endangered cat. The Acacia Woodland exhibit will allow the Zoo to have more breeding spaces for the cats. The Zoo has a spotted and a black leopard.

The aviary in this exhibit features two species of bee-eaters, the white-fronted and white-throated, as well as white-headed buffalo weavers and several other bird species. The exhibit also features African silverbills, African pygmy geese, violet-backed starlings, splendid sunbirds, blue-naped mousebirds, common waxbills, emerald-spotted wood doves, golden-breasted starlings, exclamatory paradise whydahs, magpie mannikins, Namaqua doves, pin-tailed whydahs, purple grenadiers, red-billed firefinches, red-cheeked cordon-bleus, snowy-crowned robin-chats, village indigobirds, white-bellied go-away-birds, white-headed buffalo weavers, yellow-crowned bishops, yellow-mantled widowbirds, and zebra waxbills. There are also Mozambique girdled lizards in the aviary.

==== Madagascar Forest ====
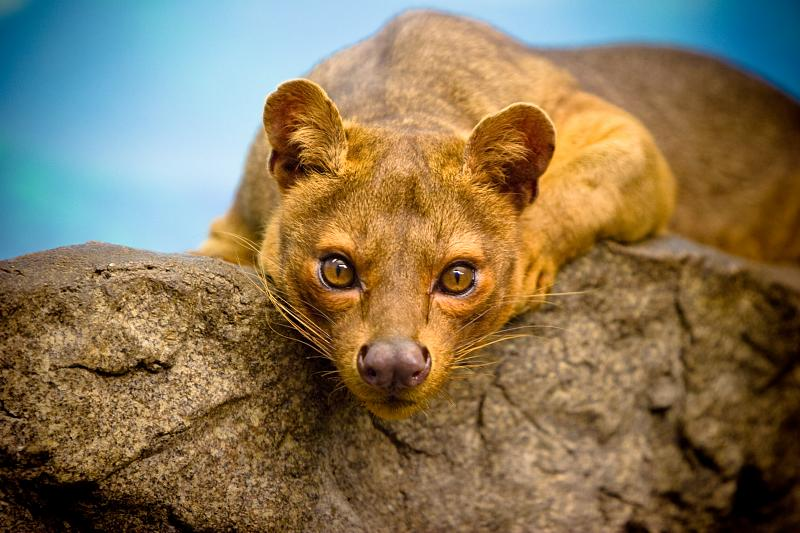
Fossa at the zoo

The Madagascar Forest exhibit features lemur species that the Association of Zoos and Aquariums' (AZA) Prosimian Taxon Advisory Group (TAG) has identified as needing sustainability assistance for the North American population, including blue-eyed black, red ruffed, red-collared, ring-tailed lemurs and Coquerel's sifakas.

Along with lemurs, the Madagascar Forest exhibit houses the lemurs' main predator the fossa as well as honey badgers.

==== Ethiopian Highlands ====
The Ethiopian Highlands exhibit houses two primate species: the gelada and the hamadryas baboon. The San Diego Zoo is only the second zoo in North America to house geladas, the other facility being the Bronx Zoo. An all-male troop of geladas arrived on September 7, 2016, from the Wilhelma Zoo in Stuttgart, Germany. This move was based on the European Association of Zoos and Aquariums' (EAZA) European Endangered Species Programme (EEP) for geladas—the European equivalent of an Association of Zoos and Aquariums' (AZA) Species Survival Plan (SSP) program. The bachelor group will be introduced to females later on. The exhibit is also home to Nubian ibexes.

==== Kopje ====
The word kopje in Dutch means "small head" which describes the rock formations that seem to pop out in the savanna. Kopjes are homes for well-adapted animals. The San Diego Zoo's Kopje section in Africa Rocks is home to animals including klipspringers, rock hyraxes, and dwarf mongoosees. Each animal has well-adapted feet that allow them to cling to the rocks. The exhibit also includes Trumpeter hornbills and bateleur eagles, as well as meerkats, servals, and the red-leaved rock fig, a tree species that manages to grow wherever its seeds disperse including the rocky kopje.

==== West African Forest ====
The West African Forest exhibits the West African dwarf crocodile, Kenyi cichlids, the Madagascan big-headed turtle, and the West African mud turtle. Behind the crocodile exhibit features Rady Falls, a 65 ft (20 m) tall waterfall, the largest man-made waterfall in San Diego.

== Special Events ==
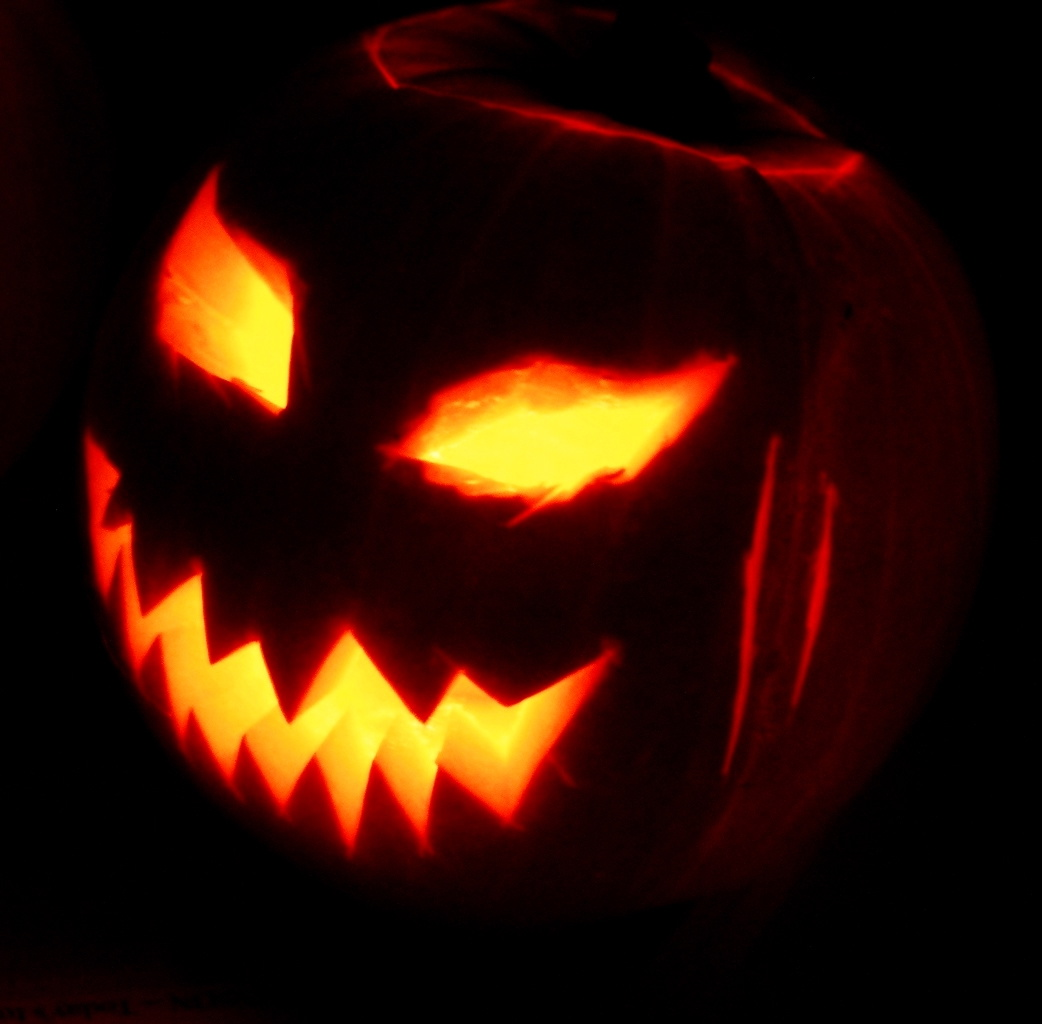
Jack-o'-lantern is what you'd typically see during Halloween

HalGLOWeen is an event that began back in 2017, it goes from October 3rd to October 31st, only on Friday, Saturday, and Sunday. The boo crew plays music for 30 minutes at 5pm, 6pm, 7pm, and 8pm, playing Halloween music. Only children 11 or under are allowed to wear costumes. HalGLOWeen festivals are free with paid admission, and children under 15 must be accompanied with a paying adult while in the zoo.

2026 February 21st to the 22nd, San Diego Zoo celebrates Lunar New Year. In the event people talk to wildlife care specialists, Horticulturists, and general experts in the field of wildlife. There are many activities: inside look tours, panda walking tours, bear walking tours, paper craft, hang a wish about wildlife, photo opportunity, and conservation support. to see their exhibitions with a guide.

Jungle Bells is happening from December 19 - Jan 4. It happens from the opening of the Zoo til 8:00 PM. In the front stage of the front street there is a Jingle Brass band, playing for 25 minutes at 4:30, 5:30, 6:30 and 7:30 PM. Then there are "Reindeer Games," playing activities and dancing with wildlife Explorers at 5, 6, and 7 pm, going for 25 minutes. In the Wildlife Explorers Basecamp, there is a Jack Frost Juggler at 4, 5, 6, and 7 PM, roaming for 30 minutes. "Holiday Troubadour" has an acoustic singer and guitarist roaming at 4:30, 5:30, and 6:30 for 30 minutes. In the Urban Jungle & Outback there is a Toy Shop Hop, Dr.Harry & His Holiday Friends, and Holiday Harmonies. The Toy Shop Hop are elf people doing acrobatics. Dr. Harry and his Holiday Friends has the event mascot, a polar bear, alongside additional characters. Holiday Harmonies has acappella quartet of Holiday classics. In the Africa Rocks Stage there is Dr. Zoolittle's One Wild Night Before Christmas. It has somebody's own interactive version of the tale of Christmas. In the Lost Forest there is Santa's Factory, where you can take a photo with Santa. In the Holiday Light Treks, there is a Holiday Light Discovery, Holiday Light Celebration, and a Holiday Light Symphony.

== Past Events ==
Running for 32 years, Nighttime Zoo had been up until August 9, 2026. It was a summer event that ran extended hours til 8:00 PM. The event has Live music, acrobats, and animal encounters. The event introduces itself with the Zoo's in house bands, The Chameleons and The Explorers. The Chameleons play acoustic guitar and vocals. The Explorers are a four-part a capella group. The event leads up to their performance of "Jumbo Dunia!" the event has the Zoo's lead singers, dancers, and acrobats. Jumbo Dunia celebrates African wildlife and the communities that share support for them.

== Conservation ==
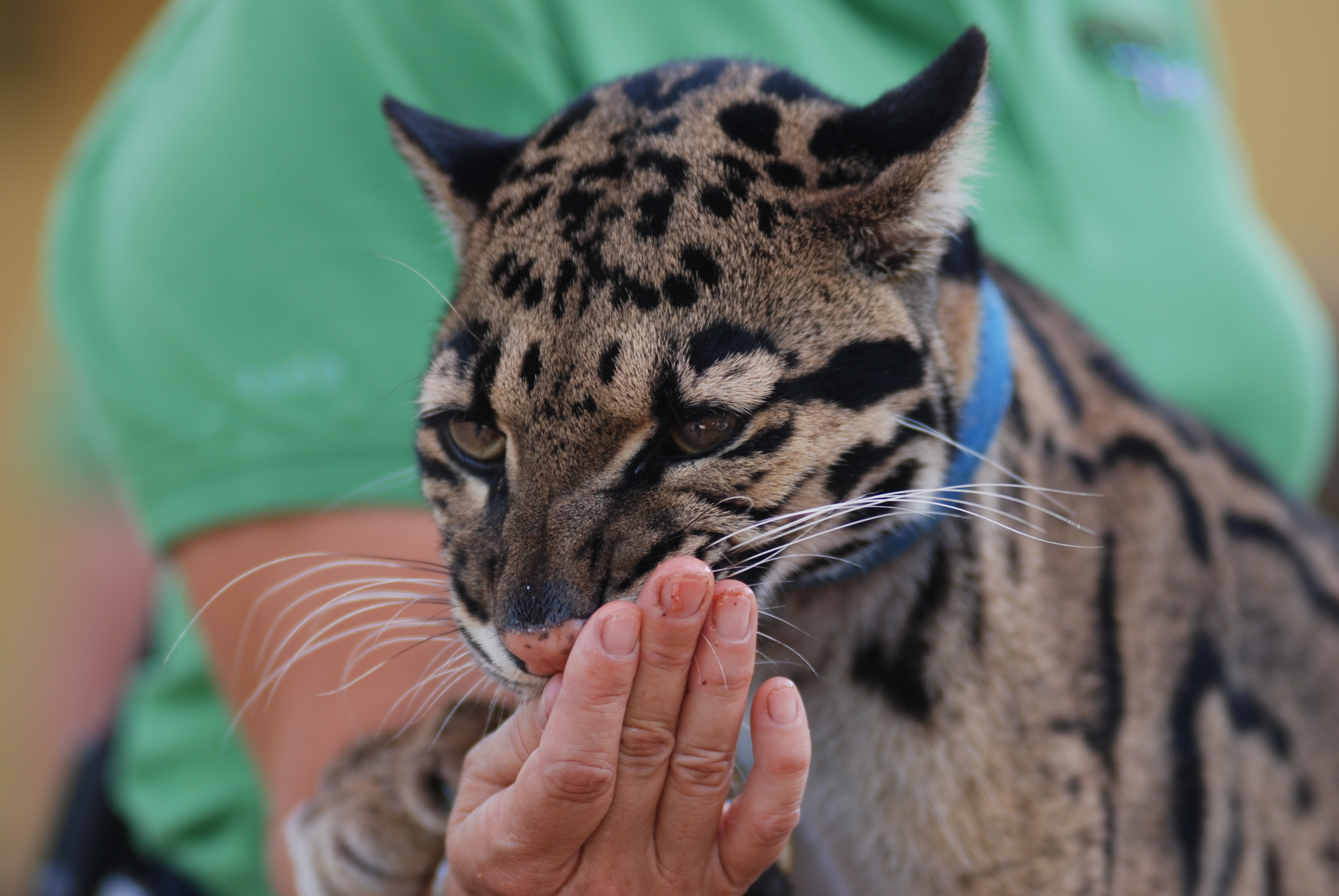
The clouded leopard is one of the species for which conservation work is being done.

The zoo is active in conservation and species-preservation efforts. Its Institute for Conservation Research (formerly the Center for Reproduction of Endangered Species) raises California condors, tigers, black rhinos, polar bears, orangutans, peninsular pronghorn, desert tortoises, African penguins, mountain yellow-legged frogs, Pacific pocket mice, dholes, Francois' langurs, giraffes, quino checkerspot butterflies, Hawaiian crows, light-footed clapper rails, Gray's monitors, tree lobsters, clouded leopards, Galapagos tortoises, Tahiti lorikeets, lion-tailed macaques, mhorr gazelles, gorillas, Przewalski's horses, saiga antelopes, koalas, burrowing owls, elephants, African wild dogs, ocelots, Tasmanian devils, okapi, Southwestern pond turtles, Pallas's cats, and 145 other endangered species.

The zoo has helped increase populations of endangered animals worldwide, both in captivity and in the wild. A prime example of this can be seen through the success of the repopulation of the California Condor. In 1982, due to poaching, lead poisoning, and destruction of habitat, there were only a remainder of 22 California Condors. The San Diego Zoo Wildlife Alliance was granted permission to begin the management of the first propagation program for the California Condor. In recognition of this program, within 20 years the population of the vulnerable bird went from 22 to 200. The success of the California condor program shows the importance of breeding efforts in saving endangered animals. By carefully managing the condor population, the San Diego Zoo Wildlife Alliance helped bring back the species from the brink of extinction. However, this is not the only species the zoo has helped with repopulation.

As a result, they have reintroduced more than 30 endangered species back into the wild, and have conserved habitat at 50 field sites. They also have over 200 conservation scientists working in 35 countries around the world. It employs numerous professional geneticists, cytologists, and veterinarians and maintains a cryopreservation facility for rare sperm and eggs called the frozen zoo.

The San Diego Zoo Institute for Conservation Research is the largest zoo-based multidisciplinary research effort in the world. Based at the Arnold and Mabel Beckman Center for Conservation Research adjacent to the San Diego Zoo Safari Park, more than 200 dedicated scientists carry out research vital to the conservation of animals, plants, and habitats, locally and internationally.

== Zoo Corps ==
Zoo Corps is a volunteer program at the San Diego Zoo that enlists high school students to teach guests at the zoo about the animals they are seeing and their place in the ecosystem. It enrolls students between 13 and 17 years of age. The goals are to promote public education about animals and conservation, and to help the students develop their ability to speak in public. The program runs year-round in two sessions, one from May through November and one from January through May. Members of the Zoo Corps are expected to volunteer at least once a month.

The program uses a series of "Kits", which are set on tables throughout the zoo. The kits contain objects that can be used to explain why an animal is endangered or to shed light on the animal's lifestyle. The four kits are "Backyard Habitats", "Saving Species", "Animal Care", and "Sustainability".

== Architecture ==
Local architect Louis John Gill designed the original buildings, cages, and animal grottos and later in 1926, the Spanish Revival-style research hospital, for which Gill received an Honor Award from the San Diego Chapter of the American Institute of Architects. Gill also designed a bird cage at the zoo in 1937, then the largest bird cage in the world.

== Awards ==
The San Diego Zoo has received numerous awards for its exhibits, programs, and reproduction and conservation efforts. This list includes only awards given to the Zoo specifically, not to its parent organization; for those, see San Diego Zoo Wildlife Alliance Awards.

Year	Awarding body	Award	Notes
1958	San Diego Zoo Convention & Tourist Bureau	First tourism award	Everyone loves San Diego zoo walking around looking at animals, cant forget about the food.
1961	American Association of Zoological Parks and Aquariums (AAZPA)	Edward H. Bean Award	For reproduction of koalas (first koala birth in Western Hemisphere)
1963	AAZPA	Edward H. Bean Award	For Galápagos tortoise hatching
1963	AAZPA	Edward H. Bean Award	For Gila monster hatching (first Gila monster conceived and hatched in captivity)
1964	AAZPA	Edward H. Bean Award	For hatching and rearing of rhinoceros iguana
1966	AAZPA	Edward H. Bean Award for Most Notable Animal Births in an American Zoo	For reproduction of proboscis monkey (first birth outside of Borneo)
1966	AAZPA	Edward H. Bean Award for Most Notable Animal Births in an American Zoo	For reproduction of thick-billed parrot (first hatching recorded in captivity)
1966	AAZPA	Edward H. Bean Award for Most Notable Animal Births in an American Zoo	For reproduction of African softshell turtle (first hatching recorded in captivity)
1974	AAZPA	Edward H. Bean Award	For birth of ruffed lemur
1987	AAZPA	Exhibit Award	For East African Rock Kopje
1988	AAZPA	Education Award	For East African Rock Kopje Interpretive Program
1989	AAZPA	Exhibit Award	For Tiger River
1989	AAZPA	Edward H. Bean Award	For California condor breeding (shared with San Diego Zoo Wild Animal Park and Los Angeles Zoo)
1991	AAZPA	Edward H. Bean Award	For François' langur propagation program
1991	AAZPA	Significant Achievement Award	For long-term propagation of Fijian iguanas
1992	AAZPA	Significant Achievement in Exhibits	For Gorilla Tropics
1995	Association of Zoos and Aquariums (AZA)	Significant Achievement Award	For Andean condor reintroduction program
1996	AZA	Significant Achievement in Exhibis	For Hippo Beach
2000	AZA	Top Honors in International Conservation	For Jamaican Iguana Conservation & Recovery Program (shared with Fort Worth Zoo, Indianapolis Zoo, Audubon Nature Institute, Sedgwick County Zoo, Tulsa Zoo, Toledo Zoo, Central Florida Zoo and Botanical Gardens, Columbus Zoo and Aquarium, Woodland Park Zoo, Gladys Porter Zoo, and Milwaukee County Zoo)
2000	AZA	Conservation Endowment Fund Award	For restoration of two critically endangered West Indian rock iguana species through headstarting and release (shared with Fort Worth Zoo)
2002	AZA	Edward H. Bean Award	For Sumatran rhinoceros breeding program (shared with Los Angeles Zoo, Wildlife Conservation Society, and Cincinnati Zoo and Botanical Garden)
2007	Avian Scientific Advisory Group (ASAG)	Plume Award for Noteworthy Achievement in Avian Husbandry	For the Light-footed Clapper Rail coalition (shared with Chula Vista Nature Center, SeaWorld San Diego, San Diego Zoo Wild Animal Park, and United States Fish and Wildlife Service Reserve)
2010	AZA	Significant Achievement in Exhibits	For Elephant Odyssey
2010	AZA	Top Honors for Excellence in Marketing	For Elephant Odyssey
2014	AZA	Top Honors in International Conservation	For Tree Kangaroo Conservation Program in Papua New Guinea (shared with Woodland Park Zoo, Brevard Zoo, Cleveland Metroparks Zoo, Columbus Zoo and Aquarium, Gladys Porter Zoo, Milwaukee County Zoological Gardens, Minnesota Zoological Garden, Oregon Zoo, Riverbanks Zoo and Garden, Roger Williams Park Zoo, Saint Louis Zoo, Santa Fe College Teaching Zoo, Sedgwick County Zoo, Smithsonian National Zoological Park, and Zoo New England)

== In popular culture ==
- The very first YouTube video, Me at the zoo, was shot in the San Diego Zoo and was uploaded to YouTube on April 23, 2005, by the website's co-founder, Jawed Karim. In addition to this, the San Diego Zoo's official YouTube account posted a comment on the video, which is also the most liked comment on the platform. A marker was placed near the elephant exhibit to commemorate the video.
- The shots of the private zoo at Xanadu in Orson Welles' 1941 film Citizen Kane were filmed at the San Diego Zoo.
- The San Diego Zoo was the filming location for the long-running documentary television series Zoorama.
- In addition to its normal publicity efforts, and web page, the zoo also produced a short TV program for several years with Joan Embery. Joan Embery brought various animals to The Tonight Show Starring Johnny Carson between 1971 and 1987, and more recently (between 1993 and 2008) The Tonight Show with Jay Leno. The zoo loaned the animals.
- The zoo was featured prominently in the 2004 movie Anchorman: The Legend of Ron Burgundy, though filming was done at the old Los Angeles Zoo, not at the San Diego Zoo.
- The zoo is featured in the 1979 film Scavenger Hunt, in which each of the five teams in a scavenger hunt steals an ostrich from the zoo. (Actual ostriches were not used.)
- The front cover of The Beach Boys' 1966 album Pet Sounds was photographed at the San Diego Zoo.
- The 6ths' first album Wasps' Nests includes a song called "San Diego Zoo", which features comprehensive directions on how to get to the zoo.
- The photographs in Helen Palmer's children's book I Was Kissed by a Seal at the Zoo were taken at the San Diego Zoo, and featured children from the Francis Parker School in San Diego interacting with the zoo's animals and staff.
- The game show Animal Planet ZooVenture taped at the San Diego Zoo between 1998 and 2000. JD Roth was the host.
- The San Diego Zoo was mentioned in the movie, Hey There, It's Yogi Bear! to which Yogi was supposed to be sent to, but he has one of his bear friends go in his place allowing him to secretly stay in Jellystone Park.
- SANDEAGOZU, a 1986 novel by Janann V. Jenner, told the story of a telepathic python who leads a rattlesnake, a coati, a langur and a macaw on an overland journey from a Depression-era New York City pet shop to the San Diego Zoo (which is treated as a Shangri-La-type paradise).

== See also ==
- Panda diplomacy – The practice of using pandas as diplomatic tools
- Balboa Park – The park where the San Diego Zoo is located
- San Diego Zoo Global – The organization overseeing the zoo and its conservation efforts
- San Diego Zoo Safari Park – A sister facility of the San Diego Zoo
- Belle Benchley – Former director of the San Diego Zoo, known as "The Zoo Lady"
