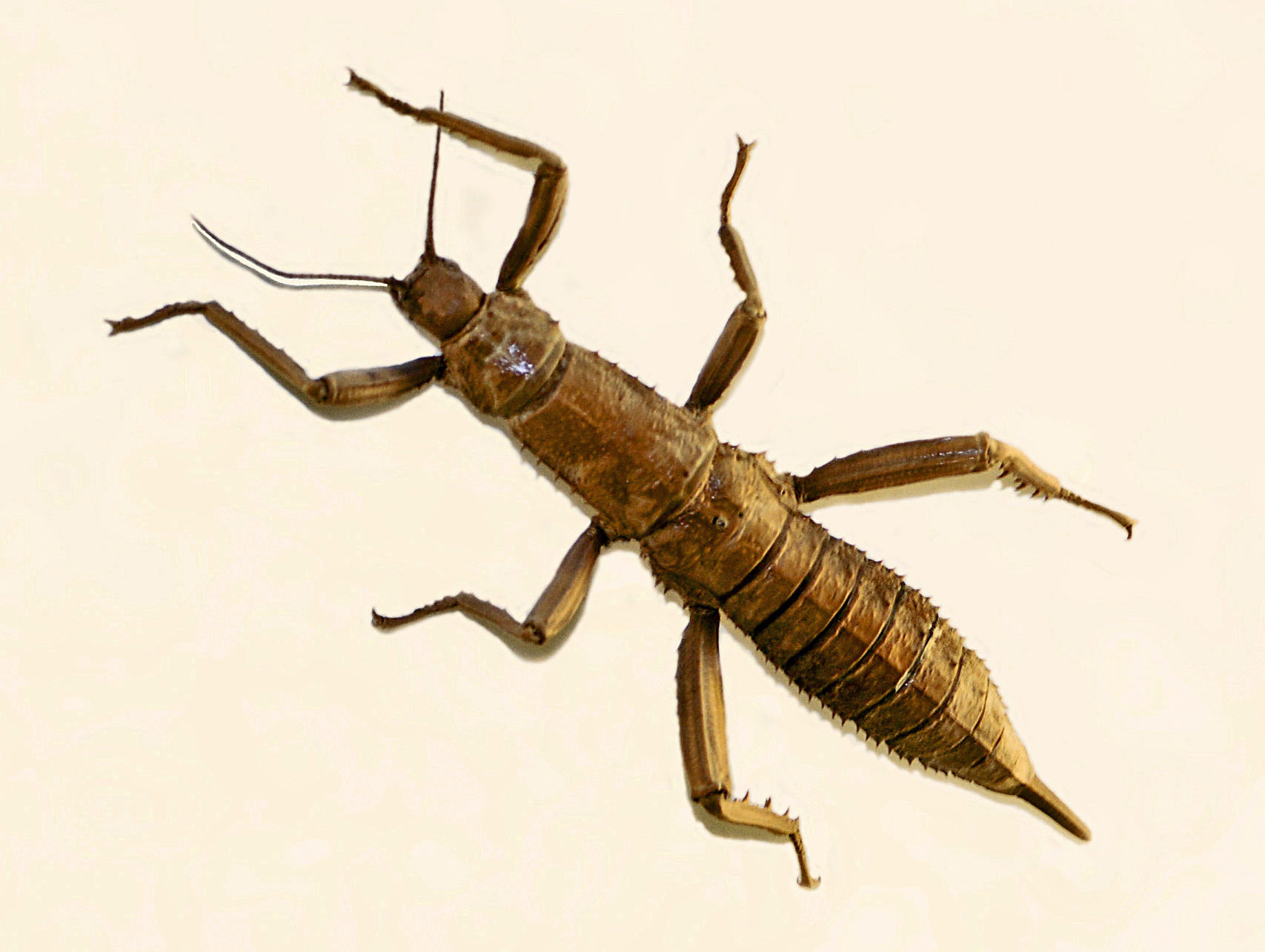
- Eurycantha species. Museum specimen

Scientific classification
- Domain: Eukaryota
- Kingdom: Animalia
- Phylum: Arthropoda
- Class: Insecta
- Order: Phasmatodea
- Infraorder: Anareolatae
- Family: Lonchodidae
- Subfamily: Lonchodinae
- Tribe: Eurycanthini
- Genus: Eurycantha; Boisduval, 1835

Synonyms
- Carabidion Redtenbacher, 1907; Karabidion Montrouzier, 1855

= Eurycantha =

Genus of stick insects

Eurycantha is a genus of Australasian stick insects: typical of the tribe Eurycanthini. It was described by Jean Baptiste Boisduval in 1835.

== Species ==
The Phasmida Species File lists:

- Eurycantha calcarata Lucas, 1869 - Giant Spiny Stick Insect (synonym E. sifia Kirby, 1904)
- Eurycantha coriacea (Redtenbacher, 1908)
- Eurycantha horrida Boisduval, 1835
- Eurycantha immunis Redtenbacher, 1908
- Eurycantha insularis Lucas, 1869
- Eurycantha latro Redtenbacher, 1908
- Eurycantha maluensis Günther, 1929
- Eurycantha micracantha (Montrouzier, 1855)
- Eurycantha portentosa Kirby, 1904
- Eurycantha rosenbergii Kaup, 1871
