= Eurycantha portentosa =

Scientific classification
- Domain: Eukaryota
- Kingdom: Animalia
- Phylum: Arthropoda
- Class: Insecta
- Order: Phasmatodea
- Family: Lonchodidae
- Genus: Eurycantha
- Species: E. portentosa

Binomial name
- Eurycantha portentosa Kirby, 1904

Species of stick insect

Eurycantha portentosa is a species of stick insect belonging to the family Lonchodidae. It was first described by British entomologist William Forsell Kirby in 1904. It is primarily found in the Rossel Island of Papua New Guinea.
