= Phobaeticus annamallayanus =

Scientific classification
- Domain: Eukaryota
- Kingdom: Animalia
- Phylum: Arthropoda
- Class: Insecta
- Order: Phasmatodea
- Family: Phasmatidae
- Genus: Phobaeticus
- Species: P. annamallayanus

Binomial name
- Phobaeticus annamallayanus (Wood-Mason, 1877)

Synonyms
- Phibalosoma annamallayanum Wood-Mason, 1877; Pharnacia annamallayana (Wood-Mason, 1877)

Species of insect

Phobaeticus annamallayanus is a species of stick insect found in forests in Tamil Nadu and Kerala. Its type location is in the forests of the Annamallay hills.

== Taxonomy ==
Phobaeticus annamallayanus is one of the 24 species of phasmids described by James Wood-Mason. He described the species from one preserved specimen given to him by a Colonel and a "much mutilated" dried specimen. Both specimens were female. Wood-Mason originally described the species as Phibalosoma annamallayanum, but the species was reclassified into the genus Pharnacia in 1904 with William Forsell Kirby's A synonymic catalogue of Orthoptera. It was subsequently renamed in 2008 as Phobaeticus annamallayanus based on the structure of its praeopercular organ, a structure only present in females and used during copulation. The species epithet derives from the Annamallay Hills where they are found.

The paper that recombined Pharnacia Annamallayanum [sic] (Note: Kirby listed the species epithet starting with a capital letter.) as Phobaeticus annamallayanus noted that another species, Phobaeticus sinetyi, bears many similarities to Ph. annamallayanus; however, the authors concluded more material was necessary to decide whether Ph. sinetyi should be considered a synonym of Ph. annamallayanus.

== Description ==
Wood-Mason's original description was very brief. He noted that Ph. annamallayanus was similar to Ph. acanthopus, but in general more compact and sturdy, with a "stout" body and "shorter and thicker" legs. In total, Wood-Mason's preserved specimen was 22.2 centimetres (8.7 in) long – the head was just 1.48 centimetres (0.58 in) in length but with 5.1-centimetre (2.0 in) antennae; the mesothorax, metathorax and abdomen combined measured 19.53 centimetres (7.69 in).
