= Phobaeticus hypharpax =

Scientific classification
- Kingdom: Animalia
- Phylum: Arthropoda
- Class: Insecta
- Order: Phasmatodea
- Family: Phasmatidae
- Genus: Phobaeticus
- Species: P. hypharpax

Binomial name
- Phobaeticus hypharpax (Westwood, 1859)

Synonyms
- Cladoxerus hypharpax (Westwood, 1859); Pharnacia spectabilis Redtenbacher, 1908; Phibalosoma hypharpax Westwood, 1859; Phobaeticus spectabilis (Redtenbacher, 1908); Tirachoidea hypharpax (Westwood, 1859)

Species of stick insect

Phobaeticus hypharpax, is a species of stick insect of the genus Phobaeticus. It is found in Sri Lanka and Southeast India. It is closely related to the Sri Lankan species Phobaeticus lobulatus and the Southeast Indian Phobaeticus sinetyi. It is characteristic for the sparse but very broad and prominent serrations of the anterodorsal carina of the front femora and unarmed medioventral carina of the middle and back femora. It is also distinctive for its particularly long abdomen.

== Taxonomy ==
It was described as a new species in 1859 by the English entomologist John O. Westwood. Later authors have suggested taxonomic transfers to the genera Phibalosoma, Tirachoidea, and Pharnacia. The holotype specimen of Phobaeticus hypharpax is kept at the British Museum of Natural History, London. The origin of the specific name hypharpax is uncertain. Two possible derivations have been suggested. It may be a compound word combining the Latin harpax (meaning 'rapacious' or 'grasping') with the Greek prefix hypo- (meaning 'under' or 'less than'). If this is the case, the name could be interpreted to mean 'not rapacious' or 'less grasping'. Alternatively, the name might be derived from Hypharpax, a genus of Australasian ground beetles (Coleoptera: Carabidae: Harpalinae) established by Alexander Macleay in 1825. This could suggest a perceived similarity to these beetles, or it might be an homage to MacLeay's work.

== Description ==
Phibalosoma hypharpax is a stick insect species characterised by its slender, cylindrical body devoid of spines. The description is based on a single male specimen, as at the time of its original collection, the female of the species had not been documented. The male P. hypharpax measures approximately 11.85 cm (4.67 in) in total body length. Its antennae are pale yellow, comprising long segments covered with fine hairs. The head is relatively large, oval-shaped, and slightly flattened, featuring pale patches on the front and sides.

The thorax maintains the slender, cylindrical form of the body, with the mesothorax measuring about 10 lines (2.1 cm) in length. The forewings, or tegmina, are small and narrow, approximately 4 lines (0.85 cm) long, and possess a prominent raised ridge (carina). The hindwings are moderately large, with a wingspan of about 4 inches (10 cm). These wings exhibit a pale brown colouration, with the costal area displaying a darker brown hue.

A distinctive feature of P. hypharpax is its exceptionally long abdomen, measuring about 34 lines (7.2 cm). The terminal segment of the abdomen is bifurcated, with the ninth segment elongated and deeply split. The two resulting divisions are denticulated on their inner surfaces.

The legs of P. hypharpax are elongated and serrated. All femora exhibit strong serrations on their edges, while the tibiae display less pronounced serrations. The middle and hind pairs of legs possess a noticeable spine on the outer edge near the base.

=== Eggs ===
The egg of Phibalosoma hypharpax is lens-shaped and slightly flattened from the sides, measuring approximately 5.5 mm in length (including its cap-like structure) and 3.8 mm in height. Its overall colour is dark yellowish-brown, with some features appearing darker. Its surface is not smooth but covered with tiny punctures, wrinkles, raised ridges, and small bumps. A noticeable ridge (called a keel) runs around the egg from top to bottom, interrupted only by a special plate-like structure on one side. This plate, known as the micropylar plate, is split into two oval lobes and surrounded by a bold black band. It contains a small cup-like depression at one end, which is important for the egg's development. The egg's cap (operculum) is slightly curved outward and oval-shaped. In its centre, there's an irregularly shaped knob-like structure on a short stalk.

== Habitat ==
Phibalosoma hypharpax was originally found in Ceylon (modern day Sri Lanka). It appears to be widely distributed in the tropical lowland and mountainous regions of the island, but absent in the northern portion. It has since been recorded in Mercara, Southeast India. No specific details about its preferred habitat or ecology were provided in the original description.
