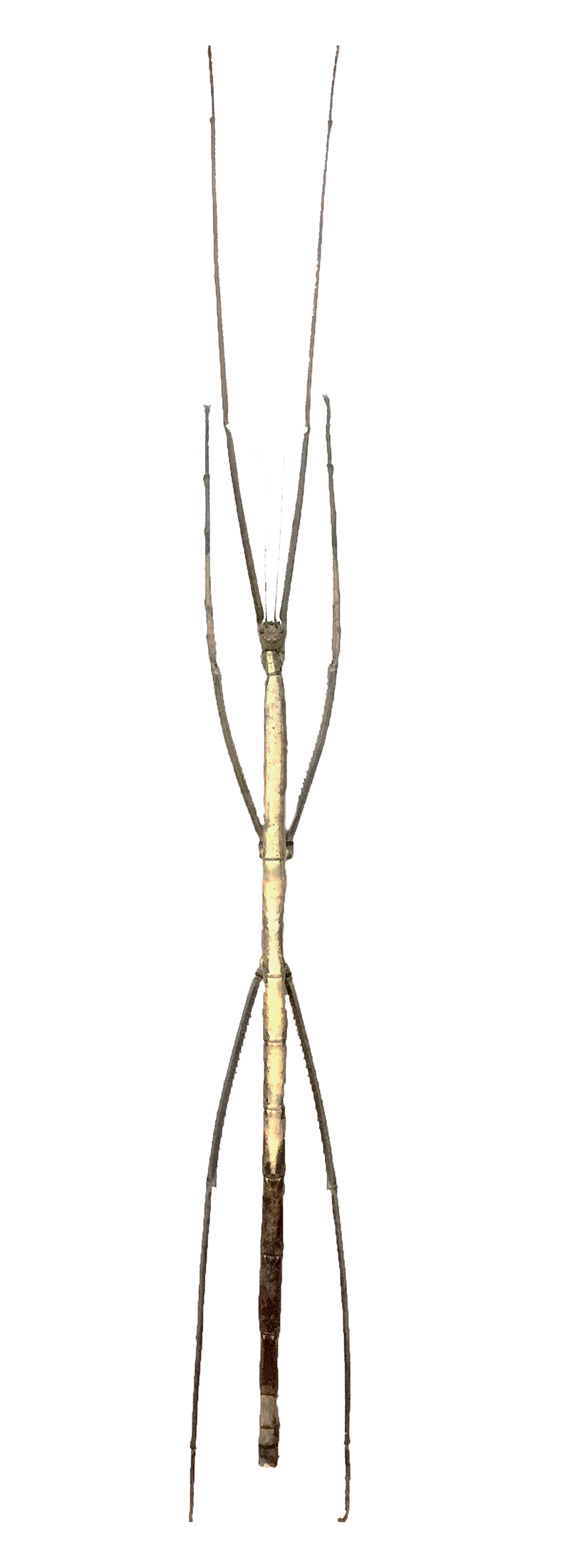
- Adult female Phobaeticus kirbyi specimen from the private collection of Andrew Markey, measuring 575mm in total length

Scientific classification
- Kingdom: Animalia
- Phylum: Arthropoda
- Class: Insecta
- Order: Phasmatodea
- Family: Phasmatidae
- Genus: Phobaeticus
- Species: P. kirbyi

Binomial name
- Phobaeticus kirbyi Brunner von Wattenwyl, 1907

Synonyms
- Baculolonga kirbyi (Brunner von Wattenwyl, 1907); Pharnacia kirbyi (Brunner von Wattenwyl, 1907); Pharnacia pilicornis Redtenbacher, 1908; Pharnacia sagitta Redtenbacher, 1908; Phobaeticus kirbiyii Seow-Choen, Grinang & Naming, 2004

= Phobaeticus kirbyi =

Species of stick insect

Phobaeticus kirbyi is species of stick insect native to Borneo. It is one of the world's longest insects. The holotype deposited at the Natural History Museum in London measures 32.8 cm (12.9 in) in body length and 54.6 cm (21.5 in) total length, including extended legs. This makes it the third-longest known insect in terms of body length, behind the stick insects Phryganistria "chinensis" (an informal name for a currently undescribed species) with 36.1 cm (14.2 in) and Phobaeticus chani with 35.7 cm (14.1 in). P. "chinensis", P. chani, P. serratipes and Ctenomorpha gargantua exceed it in total length with legs extended (no body lengths of females have been published for the last two, making it unclear if they also surpass P. kirbyi in this measurement). Recent specimens of P. kirbyi have only reached 28.3 cm (11.1 in) in body length.
