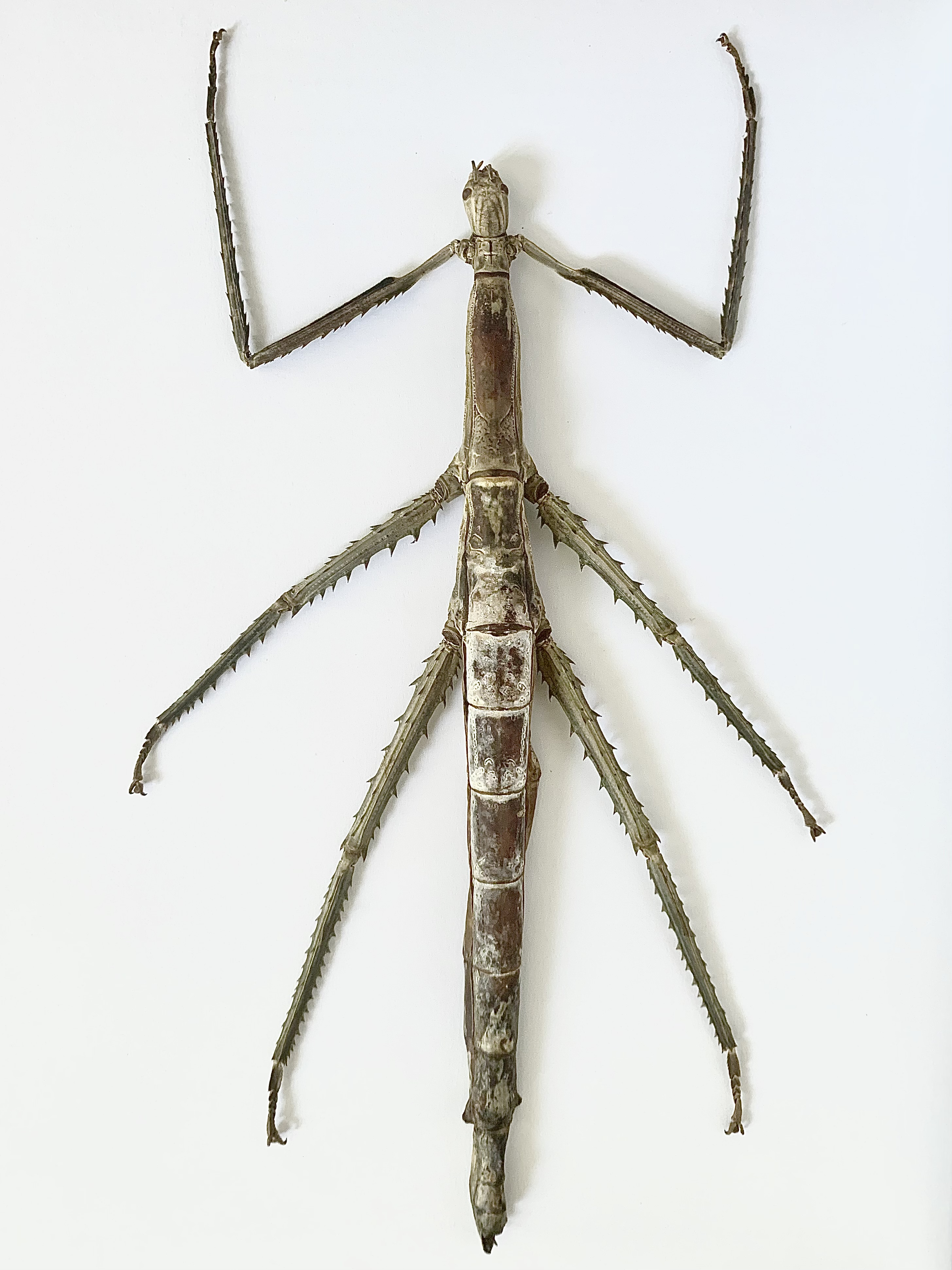
- Adult female Pharnacia sumatrana specimen from the private collection of Andrew Markey

Scientific classification
- Domain: Eukaryota
- Kingdom: Animalia
- Phylum: Arthropoda
- Class: Insecta
- Order: Phasmatodea
- Family: Phasmatidae
- Subfamily: Clitumninae
- Tribe: Pharnaciini
- Genus: Pharnacia
- Species: P. sumatrana

Binomial name
- Pharnacia sumatrana (Brunner von Wattenwyl, 1907)

Synonyms
- Pharnacia rigida Redtenbacher, 1908

= Pharnacia sumatrana =

Species of insect

Pharnacia sumatrana or Sumatran Stick Insect is a species of stick insect endemic to Peninsular Malaysia, Sumatra, Java.

== Description ==
Females are large and have a body length over 200 mm (7.9 in). Males are much smaller, with a body length of about 120 mm (4.7 in). Males have wings but are poor fliers.
