= Pterinoxylus =

Scientific classification
- Domain: Eukaryota
- Kingdom: Animalia
- Phylum: Arthropoda
- Class: Insecta
- Order: Phasmatodea
- Family: Phasmatidae
- Subfamily: Cladomorphinae
- Genus: Pterinoxylus; Serville, 1838

Genus of insects

Pterinoxylus is a genus of phasmids belonging to the family Phasmatidae.

The species of this genus are found in Central America.

Species:

- Pterinoxylus crassus Kirby, 1889
- Pterinoxylus eucnemis (Burmeister, 1838)
- Pterinoxylus perarmatus (Redtenbacher, 1908)
- Pterinoxylus spinulosus Redtenbacher, 1908
