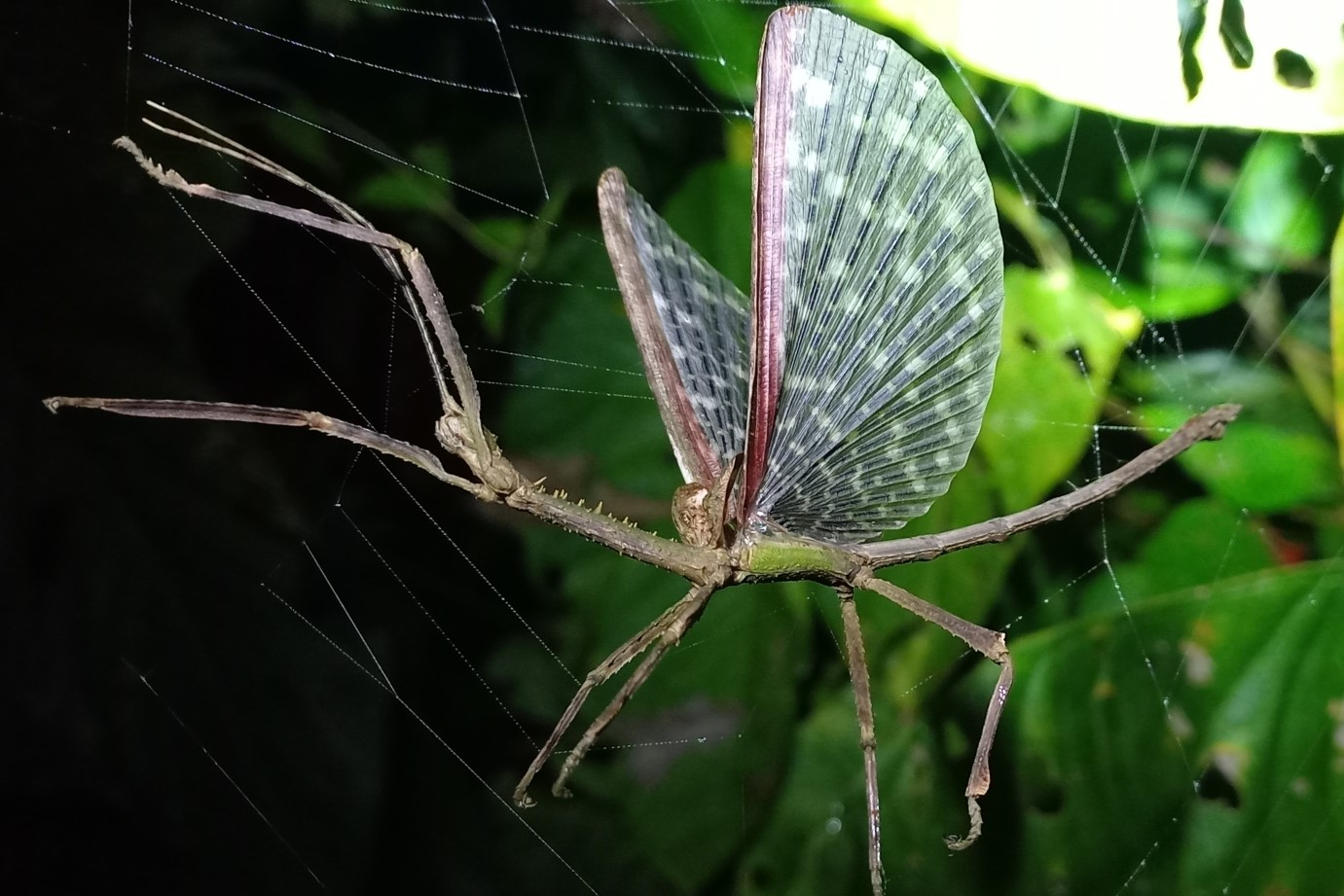

Scientific classification
- Kingdom: Animalia
- Phylum: Arthropoda
- Class: Insecta
- Order: Phasmatodea
- Infraorder: Anareolatae
- Family: Phasmatidae
- Subfamily: Cladomorphinae
- Genus: Pterinoxylus
- Species: P. spinulosus

Binomial name
- Pterinoxylus spinulosus Redtenbacher, 1908

= Pterinoxylus spinulosus =

Species of stick insect

Pterinoxylus spinulosus is a species of stick insect found in the Neotropics. It was first described by the Austrian entomologist Ludwig Redtenbacher in 1908, from an adult male and an immature female. It was not until 1957 that an adult female was described by J.A.G. Rehn.

== Description ==
This species is sexually dimorphic. The male is slender and elongated with large wings which are normally kept closely folded, while the female is larger and more robust, but with smaller wings. Both sexes are some shade of greyish-brown or dull brown, and the female sometimes has pale, lichen-like markings. When in the resting attitude by day, the insects resemble pieces of twig and are difficult to distinguish from the surroundings.

== Ecology ==
Like other stick insects, Pterinoxylus spinulosus is a herbivore, and in captivity it can be maintained on a diet of guava leaves (Psidium sp.). It has several modes of defence against predation. The first is crypsis; the insect is nocturnal in its habits and both adults and nymphs spend the day stationary in a resting position with the front legs extended forward beside the head and the other two pairs of legs folded tightly to resemble side twigs on a dead stick. This arrangement of limbs conceals the head and may deceive a visually-hunting predator so that the insect remains unnoticed.

However if disturbed by being touched, the insects raise their wings sharply. The male holds its wings and tegmina (leathery front wings) vertically and this has the effect of making the insect appear larger. It may maintain this position for a minute or more and then snap the wings shut. If further disturbed it may repeat these actions, or it may fly off. Under similar circumstances, the female raises its tegmina vertically and extends its wings laterally. This exposes the bright red underside of the tegmina in a "startle" display. The wings are translucent and dark brown, with black venation, and produce metallic reflections in sunlight. While holding the tegmina open, the wings move rapidly forwards and backwards, rubbing against the tegmina and producing a stridulatory sound. This sound has been described as being like that produced by a bumblebee or a distant aircraft.
