= Phobaeticus lobulatus =

Scientific classification
- Domain: Eukaryota
- Kingdom: Animalia
- Phylum: Arthropoda
- Class: Insecta
- Order: Phasmatodea
- Family: Phasmatidae
- Genus: Phobaeticus
- Species: P. lobulatus

Binomial name
- Phobaeticus lobulatus (Carl, 1913)

Synonyms
- Eucarcharus lobulatus Carl, 1913

Species of stick insect

Phobaeticus lobulatus, is a species of phasmid or stick insect of the genus Phobaeticus. It is found in Sri Lanka.
