= William Forsell Kirby =

British entomologist (1844–1912)

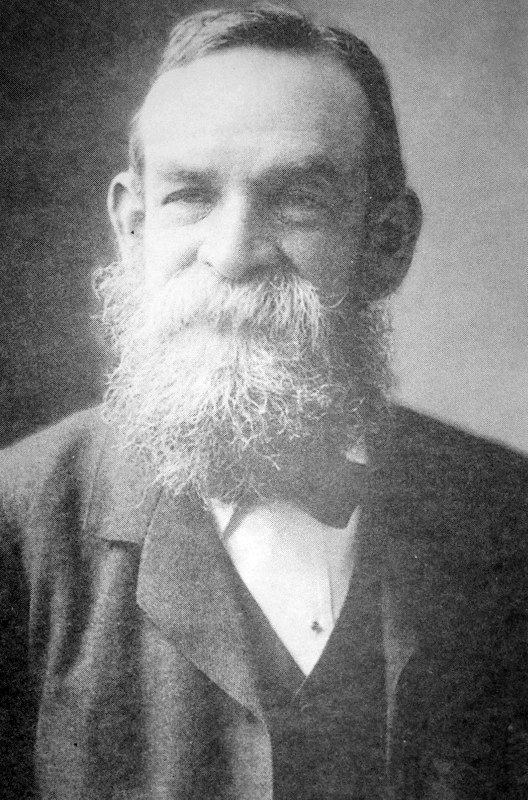
William Forsell Kirby

William Forsell Kirby (14 January 1844 – 20 November 1912) was an English entomologist and folklorist. He specialized in the study of the stick insects, describing nearly 70 species and 22 genera. His collection filled 120 cabinets and claimed that on reorganization, it would need 500 drawers. The stick insect Phobaeticus kirbyi described from Borneo and named by Brunner in 1907 after Kirby is one of the largest stick insects in the world.

== Life and work ==
Kirby was born in Leicester. He was the eldest son of banker Samuel Kirby and Lydia Forsell. He was educated privately, and became interested in butterflies and moths at an early age. The family moved to Brighton, where he became acquainted with Henry Cooke, Frederick Merrifield and J. N. Winter through the Brighton and Sussex entomological society. He published his first entomological article in 1856. He was elected fellow of the Entomological Society of London in 1861. He published the Manual of European Butterflies in 1862.

Kirby lived in Germany in 1866 where he met and married Johanna Maria Kappel (1835-1893). Johanna known as "Hannchen" was the second daughter of farmer Wilhelm Kappel and Sibilla Gertraud Kirberg. They had a son William Egmont Kirby (1844 -1912) who also became an entomologist. Johanna's younger brother was the entomologist August Kappel (1840-1915) who became a fellow of the Linnean Society. In 1867 Kirby became a curator in the Museum of the Royal Dublin Society, and produced a Synonymic Catalogue of Diurnal Lepidoptera (1871; Supplement 1877). He moved to London in 1879 when he joined the staff of the British Museum (Natural History) as an assistant, after the death of Frederick Smith. Here he lived close to his friend H. W. Bates after whom he named a couple of stick insect species.

Kirby published a number of catalogues, as well as Rhopalocera Exotica (1887–1897) and an Elementary Text-book of Entomology. He also did important work on orthopteroid insects including a three volume Catalogue of all known species (1904, 1906, 1910). He retired in 1909.

Kirby had a wide range of interests, knew many languages (a working knowledge of German, Italian, Persian, Portuguese, Spanish, Russian, Swedish, Danish and Finnish) and fully translated Finland's national epic, the Kalevala, from Finnish into English. Kirby's translation, which carefully reproduces the Kalevala meter, was a major influence on the writings of J.R.R. Tolkien, who first read it in his teens. Kirby also provided many footnotes to Sir Richard Burton's translation of the Arabian Nights.

Kirby died at Chiswick and was buried in Chiswick cemetery. An obituary was written by his son who noted that he was “never tiring assistance to all who required help or counsel endeared him to a large circle of friends and acquaintances”.

== Evolution ==
Kirby was an advocate of theistic evolution. In his book Evolution and Natural Theology, he argued that evolution and theism are compatible. He noted that creationism was scientifically untenable and refuted its arguments. He viewed nature as a "vast self-adjusting machine".

== Publications ==
=== Entomology ===
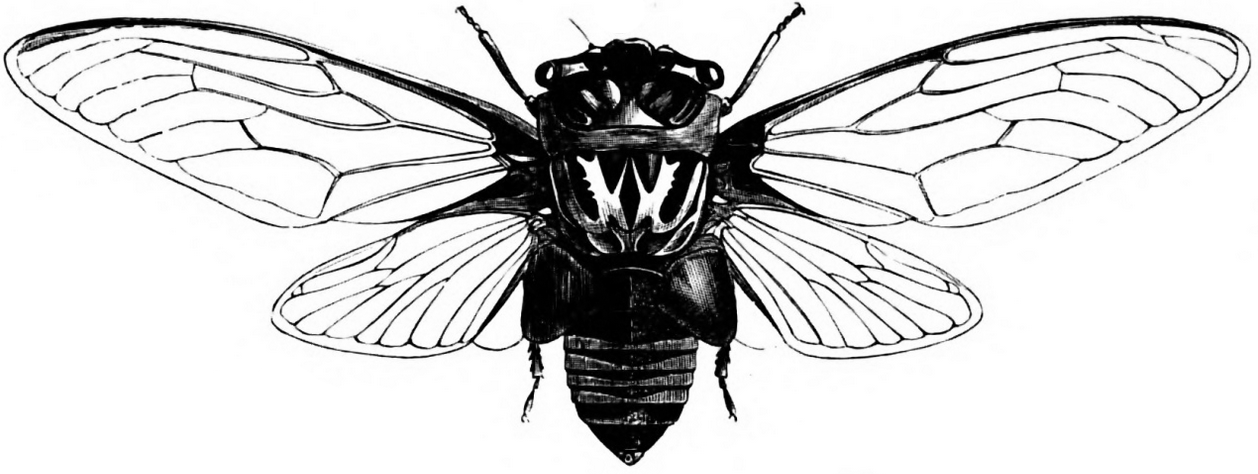
An illustration of the cicada Thopha saccata in Kirby's 1885 Elementary text-book of entomology

- Manual of European Butterflies, on the plan of Stainton's manual of British Butterflies and Moths. 1862.
- A synonymic catalogue of diurnal Lepidoptera. 1871.
  - A synonymic catalogue of diurnal Lepidoptera (Supplement). 1877.
- Catalogue of the collection of diurnal Lepidoptera formed by the late William Chapman Hewitson, of Otlands, Walton-on Thames; and bequeathed by him to the British Museum. 1879.
- European butterflies and moths ... Based upon Berge's "Schmetterlingsbuch". 1882.
- Tenthredinidoe and Siricidoe. Vol. 1. 1882.
- British Butterflies, Moths & Beetles, 1885
- Elementary text-book of entomology, 1885
- g. f., H. (1892), "A synonymic catalogue of Lepidoptera Heterocera. (Moths)", Nature, 1 Sphinges and Bombyces (1195): 487, Bibcode:1892Natur..46..487G, doi:10.1038/046487a0, S2CID 3985940
- A Hand-book to the Order Lepidoptera
  - Butterflies (Part.1), vol. 1, 1896
  - Butterflies (Part.2), vol. 2, 1896
  - Moths (Part.1), vol. 3, 1897
  - Moths (Part.2), vol. 4, 1897
  - Moths (Part.3), vol. 5, 1897
- "Marvels of Ant Life", Nature, 59 (1516): 52, 1898, Bibcode:1898Natur..59T..52., doi:10.1038/059052f0, S2CID 4017242
- A synonymic catalogue of Neuroptera Odonata, or dragon-flies. With an appendix of fossil species, 1890
- Familiar butterflies and moths, 1901
- "The Butterflies and moths of Europe", Nature, 69 (1783), Cassell & Co. Ltd., London: 197–198, 1903, Bibcode:1903Natur..69R.197., doi:10.1038/069197c0, hdl:2027/uc1.31175035213779, S2CID 38721803
- A Synonymic Catalogue of Orthoptera, British Museum (Natural History)
  - Orthoptera, Euplexoptera, Cursoria, et Gressoria, vol. 1, 1904
  - Orthoptera Saltatoria (Part.1) - Achetidae et Phasgonuridae, 1906
  - Orthoptera Saltatoria (Part.2) - Locustidae vel Acridiidae, vol. 3, 1910
- "Orthoptera (Acridiide)", The Fauna of British India including Ceylon and Burma, 1914

Collaborative works, and other acknowledgements

- Hewitson, William Chapman (1862), Illustrations of diurnal Lepidoptera, vol. 1 (Text)
- Hewitson, William Chapman (1862), Illustrations of diurnal Lepidoptera, vol. 1 (Plates)
- Gross-Smith, Henley (1887), Rhopalocera exotica; being illustrations of new, rare, and unfigured species of butterflies, London: Gurney & Jackson
  - (Papilionidae - Papilioninae), vol. 1, 1887
  - (Nymphalidae - Danainae - Ravadeba - Satyridae - Nymphalidae - Elymniinae), vol. 2, 1887
  - (Erycinidae - Lemoniidae - Lycaenidae), vol. 3, 1887, with index
- Lydekker, Ricard; Kirby, W. F.; Woodward, Bernard Barham; Kirkpatrick, R.; Pocock, R. I.; Sharpe, Richard Bowdler; Garstang, Walter; Bather, Francis Arthur; Bernard, Henry Meyners (1897), Natural History, New York, D. Appleton and company
- Hubner, Jacob; Geyer, Carl (1908), Zuträge zur Sammlung exotischer Schmetterlinge : bestehend in Bekundigung einzelner Fliegmuster neuer oder rarer nichteuropäischer Gattungen, vol. 1 , index and introductions
- Hubner, Jacob (1908), Zuträge zur Sammlung exotischer Schmetterlinge : bestehend in Bekundigung einzelner Fliegmuster neuer oder rarer nichteuropäischer Gattungen, vol. 2 , index and introductions

=== Other biology ===
- Evolution and Natural Theology, 1883
- British flowering plants, 1906

=== Literary ===
- The new Arabian nights. Select tales, not included by Galland or Lane, Philadelphia, J.B. Lippincott & co., 1883 , translator and editor
- Burton, Richard F., ed. (1886), "Contributions to the Bibliography of the Thousand and One Nights and Their Imitations", The Nights (appendix), vol. 10
- The Hero of Esthonia, and Other Studies in the Romantic Literature of That Country, 1895 , compiled and translated from Estonian and German
- Kalevala: The Land of Heroes, vol. 1, 1907 , translator
- Kalevala: The Land of Heroes, vol. 2, 1907 , translator
