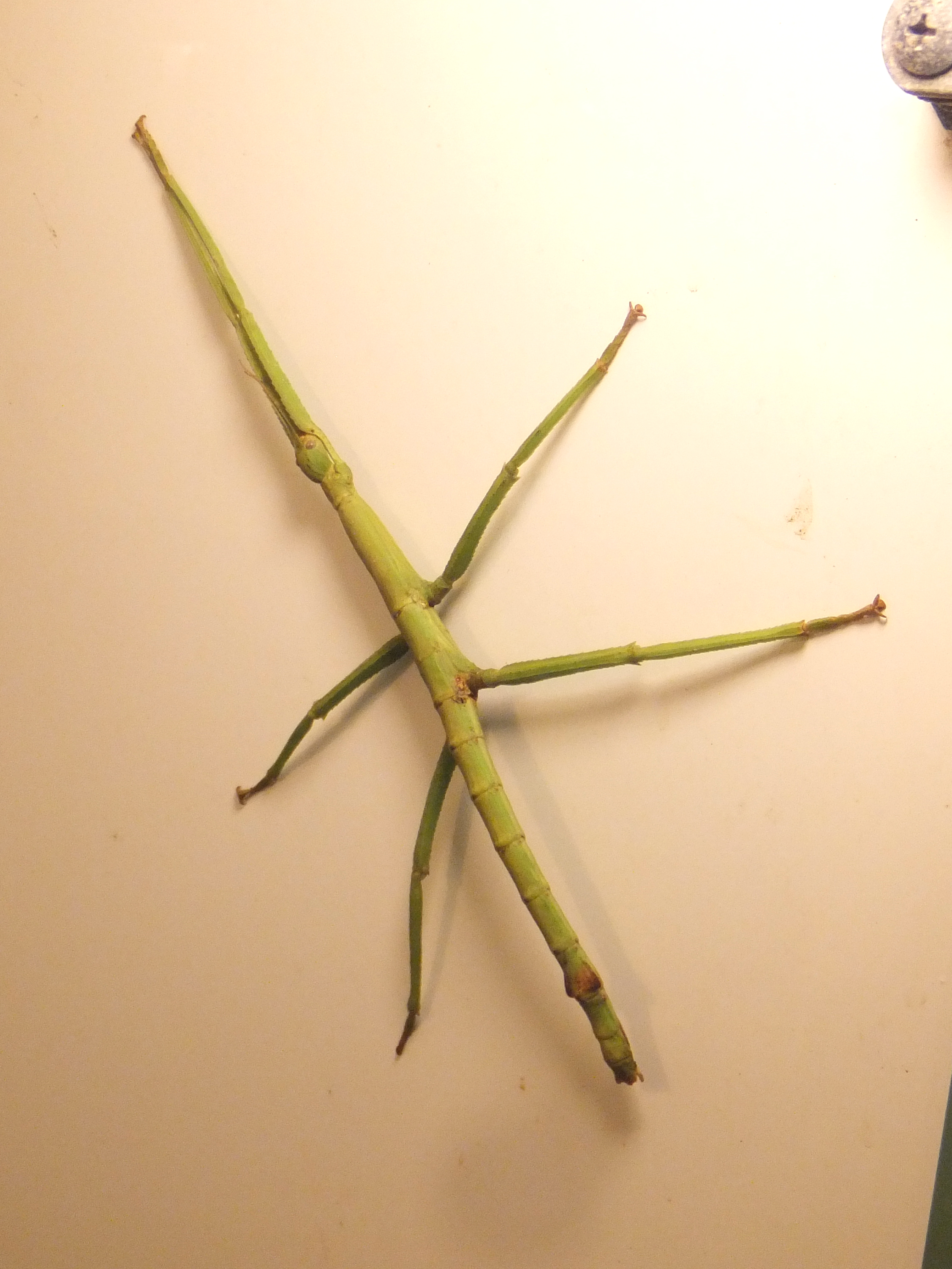
- Pharnacia sumatrana

Scientific classification
- Kingdom: Animalia
- Phylum: Arthropoda
- Clade: Pancrustacea
- Class: Insecta
- Order: Phasmatodea
- Infraorder: Anareolatae
- Family: Phasmatidae
- Subfamily: Clitumninae
- Tribe: Pharnaciini
- Genus: Pharnacia; Stål, 1877

Synonyms
- Lobophasma Günther, 1935

= Pharnacia =

Genus of insects

Pharnacia is a tropical Asian genus of stick insects in the family Phasmatidae and subfamily Clitumninae (tribe Pharnaciini). Some species formerly placed in this genus have been reassigned to Phobaeticus.

== Species ==
The Catalogue of Life lists:

- Pharnacia borneensis Hennemann & Conle, 2008
- Pharnacia heros Redtenbacher, 1908
- Pharnacia kalag Zompro, 2005
- Pharnacia palawanica Hennemann & Conle, 2008
- Pharnacia ponderosa Stål, 1877 - type species
- Pharnacia rex (Günther, 1928)
- Pharnacia sumatrana (Brunner von Wattenwyl, 1907)
- Pharnacia tirachus (Westwood, 1859)
