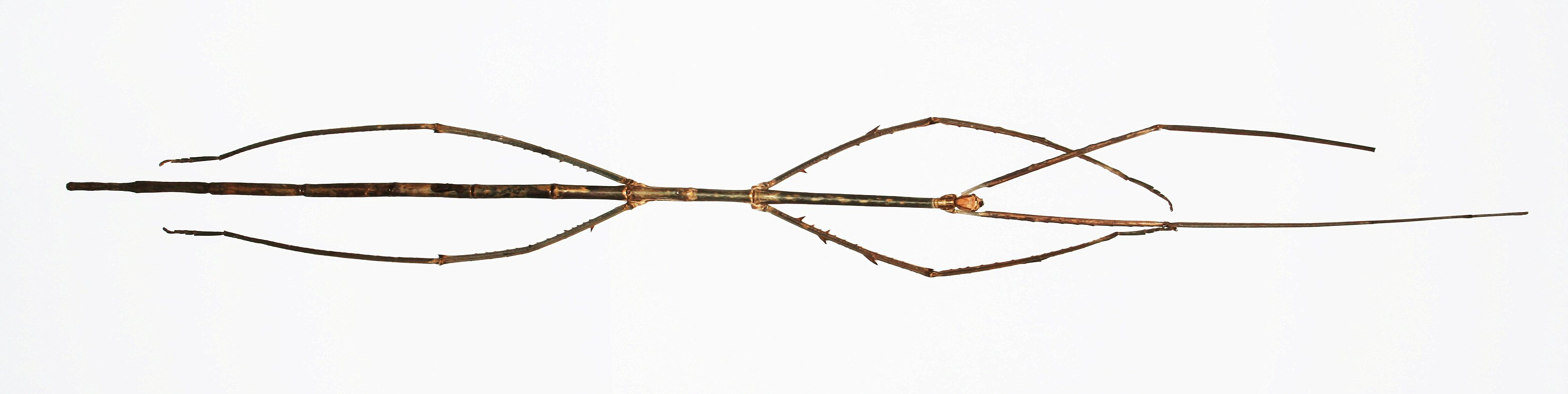
- Female holotype of P. chani
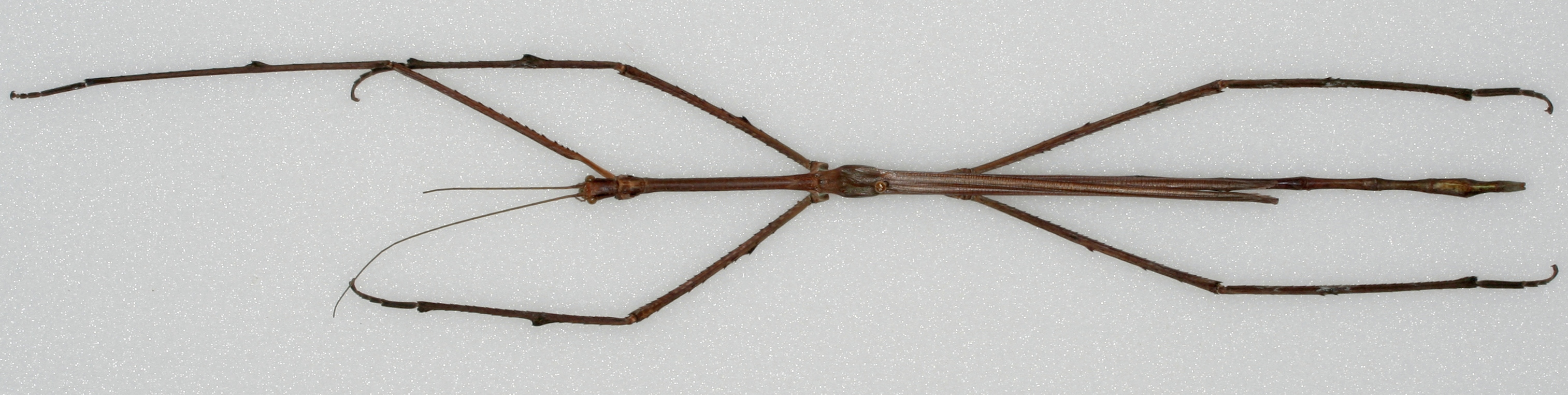
- Male paratype of Phobaeticus chani

Scientific classification
- Kingdom: Animalia
- Phylum: Arthropoda
- Clade: Pancrustacea
- Class: Insecta
- Order: Phasmatodea
- Family: Phasmatidae
- Subfamily: Clitumninae
- Tribe: Pharnaciini
- Genus: Phobaeticus
- Species: P. chani

Binomial name
- Phobaeticus chani Bragg, 2008

Synonyms
- Sadyattes chani (Bragg, 2008)

= Phobaeticus chani =

Species of stick insect

Phobaeticus chani, the Chan's megastick (also known by its synonym Sadyattes chani), is a species of stick insect in the tribe Pharnaciini, native to the southeast Asian island of Borneo. It is one of the longest insects in the world and was once considered the record-holder (it is currently held by a scientifically undescribed species discovered in 2014 and informally known as Phryganistria "chinensis"). One specimen held in the Natural History Museum in London measures 56.7 cm (22.3 in). This measurement is, however, with the front legs fully extended. The body alone still measures an impressive 35.7 cm (14.1 in).

It is named after amateur Malaysian naturalist Datuk Chan Chew Lun.

Phobaeticus chani was selected as one of "The Top 10 New Species" described in 2008 by the International Institute for Species Exploration at Arizona State University and an international committee of taxonomists. The species was also listed as one of the top 10 discoveries of the decade in the BBC television documentary Decade of Discovery, first broadcast on December 14, 2010.
