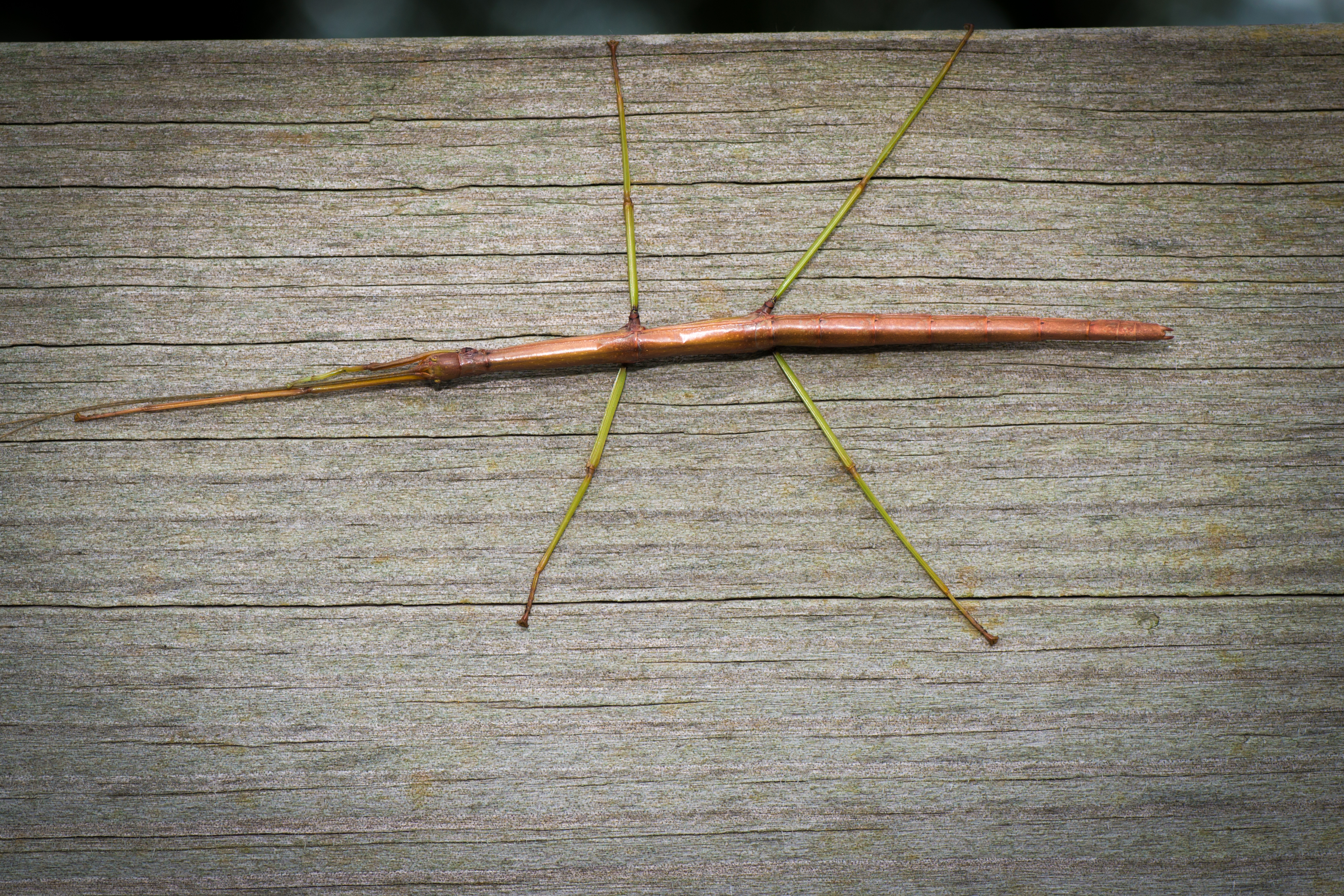

Conservation status
- Apparently Secure (NatureServe)

Scientific classification
- Kingdom: Animalia
- Phylum: Arthropoda
- Clade: Pancrustacea
- Class: Insecta
- Order: Phasmatodea
- Family: Diapheromeridae
- Genus: Diapheromera
- Species: D. femorata

Binomial name
- Diapheromera femorata (Say, 1824)

Synonyms
- Diapheromera betulla (Taylor, 1862); Diapheromera laevissimus (Brunner von Wattenwyl, 1907); Diapheromera linearis (Gosse, 1859); Diapheromera sayi Gray, 1835; Spectrum betulla Taylor, 1862; Bacunculus laevissimus Brunner von Wattenwyl, 1907

= Common walkingstick =

Species of stick insect

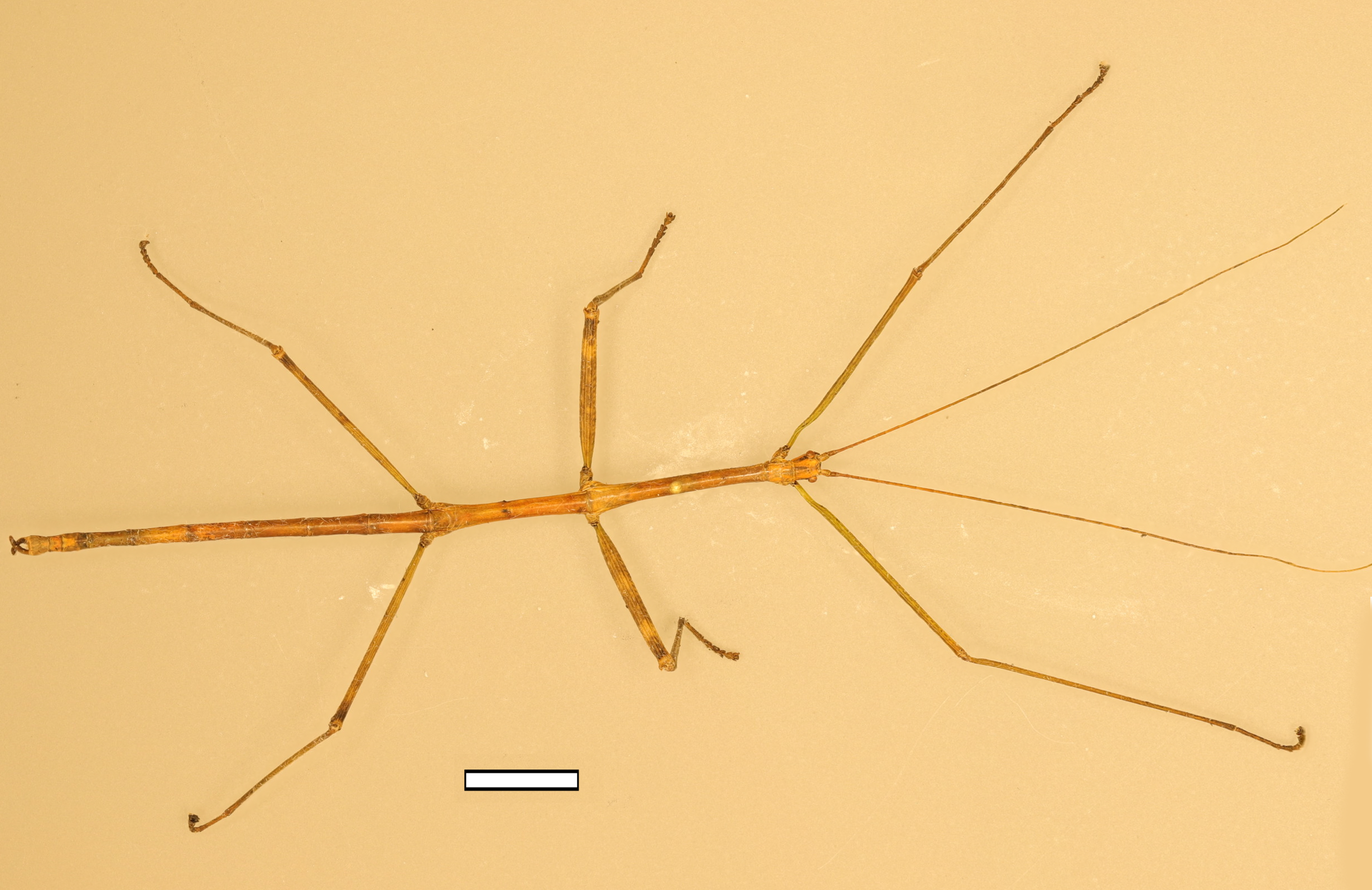

The common walkingstick or northern walkingstick (Diapheromera femorata) is a species of phasmid or stick insect found across North America. The average length of this species is 75 millimetres (3.0 inches) for males and 95 mm (3.7 in) for females.

The insect is found in deciduous forest throughout North America, where it eats many types of plant foliage. Even though the common walkingstick is a generalist it does tend to prefer foliage from oak and hazelnut trees. Localised clusters of these insects sometimes occur; however, the insects have no wings, and dispersal from tree to tree is limited.

== Description ==
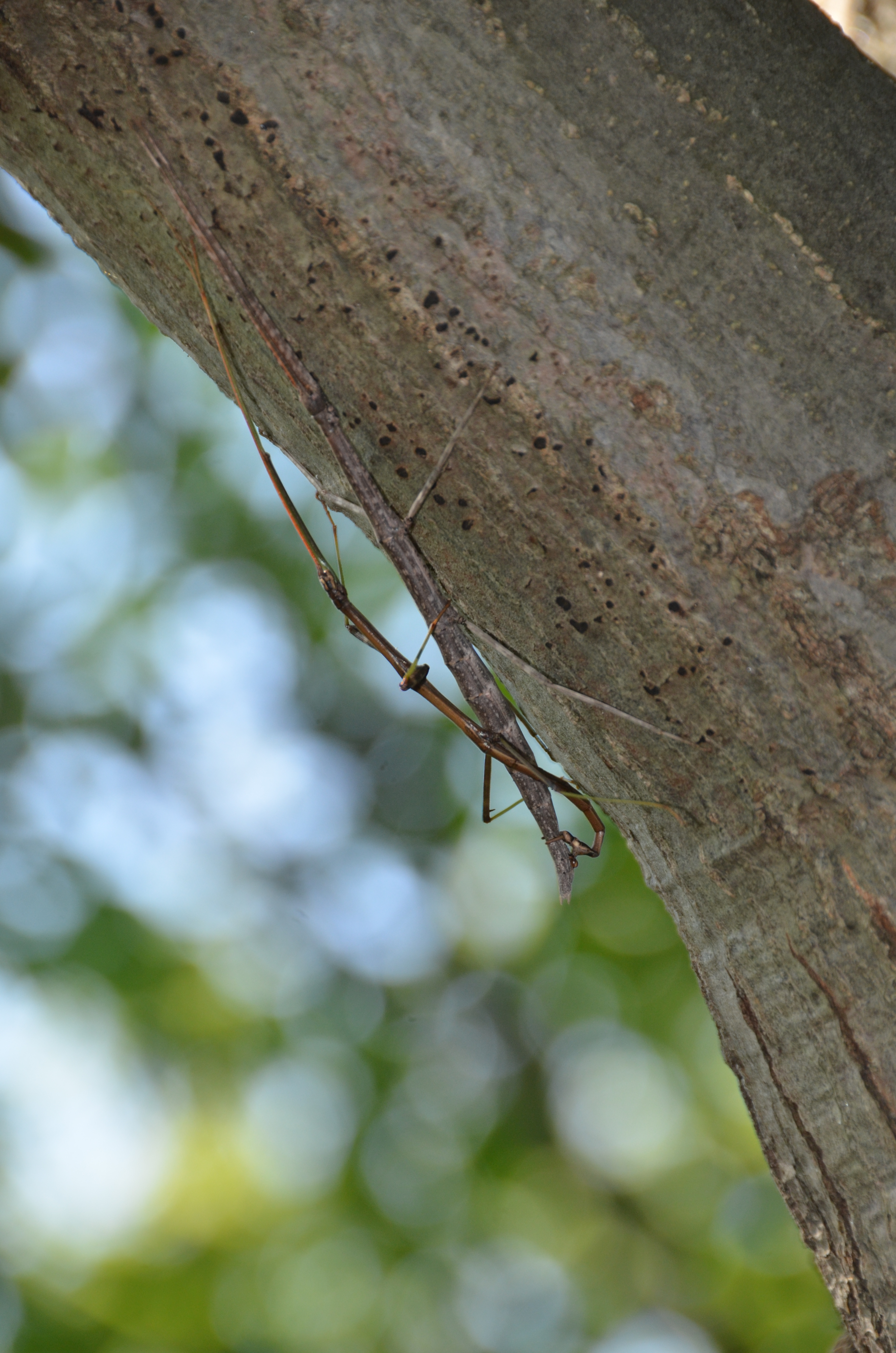
A pair of mating D. femorata in the Hudson Highlands region of New York

The common walkingstick is a slender, elongated insect that camouflages itself by resembling a twig. The sexes differ, with the male usually being brown and about 75 mm (3 in) in length while the female is greenish-brown, and rather larger at 95 mm (3.7 in). There are three pairs of legs, but at rest, the front pair is extended forward beside the antennae, forming an extension of the twig-like effect. Neither sex has wings, the antennae are two-thirds of the length of the body, and each of the cerci (paired appendages at the tip of the abdomen) has a single segment.

== Distribution ==
The walkingstick is native to North America. Its range extends from the Atlantic coast from Maine to Florida, as far west as California and northwards to North Dakota. It also occurs in Canada (where it is the only stick insect) being present in Alberta, Manitoba, Ontario and Québec.

== Ecology ==
D. femorata is herbivorous, feeding mainly on the leaves of trees. They are leaf skeletonisers, eating the tissues between the leaf veins, pausing for a while and then walking on to new leaves. They can feed at any time of day but the greatest feeding activity has been noted between 9 pm and 3 am. Early-stage nymphs are often found on American hazel (Corylus americana) and black cherry (Prunus serotina), but where these are scarce, they are likely to be on white oak (Quercus alba). Older individuals may choose black oak (Quercus velutina). Another food tree is the black locust (Robinia pseudoacacia). Adults are present in August and September in the northern part of the range, but because of their tendency to feed high in the canopy, the insects are seldom seen.

The stick insect life cycle is hemimetabolous, proceeding through a series of nymphal stages. Breeding takes place in late summer after the nymph has moulted for the last time and become an adult. Egg-laying takes place about a week after mating and the eggs, measuring 2.5 mm (0.1 in) across, are dropped singly to the forest floor. Here they overwinter in the leaf litter, hatching the following May or even a year later. If conditions are dry, the newly hatched young may fail to extricate themselves from their egg-capsules. Ones that succeed in doing so climb up the trunks of trees, start to feed on the foliage, and pass through four to six moults as they grow.
