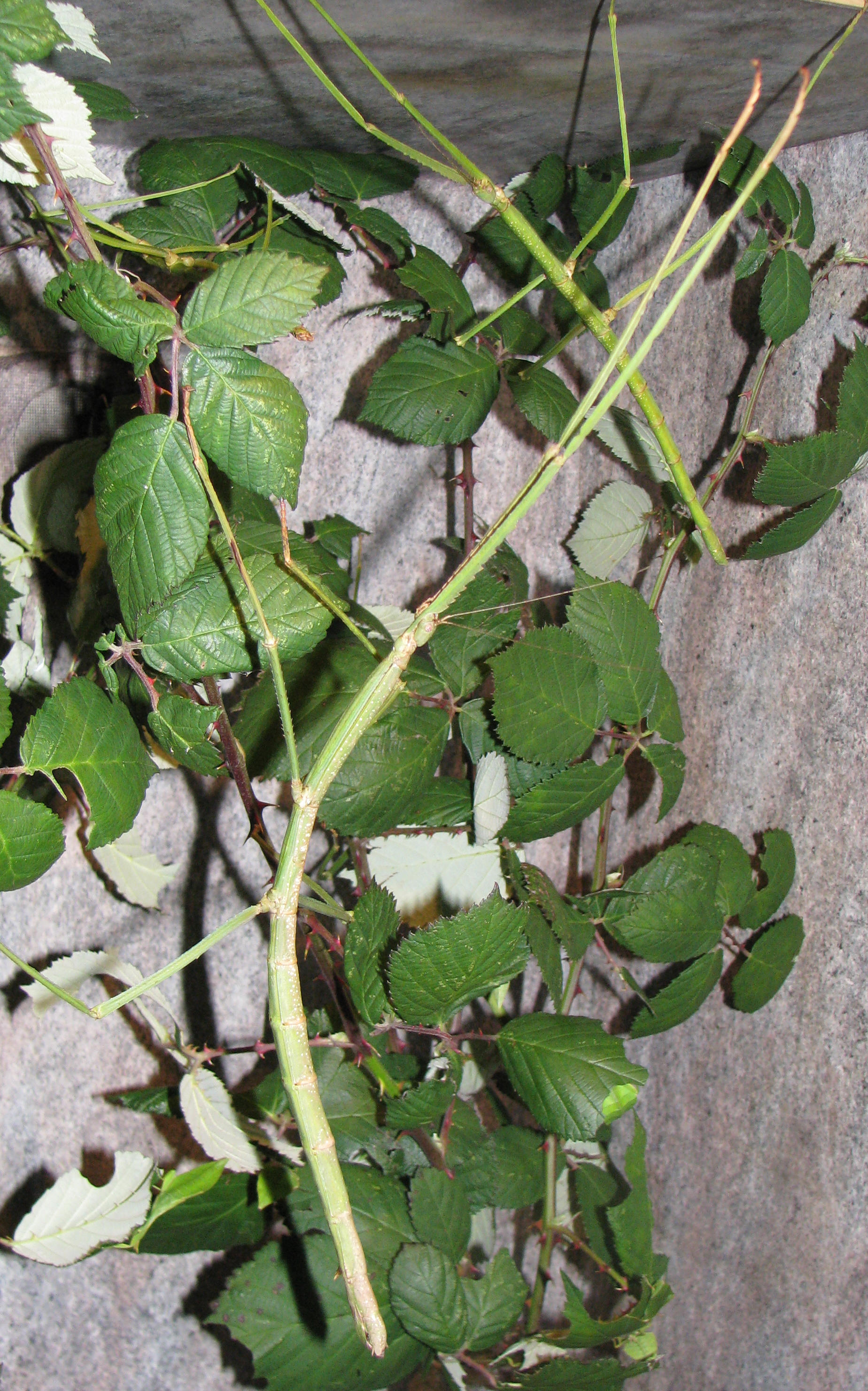
- Phobaeticus serratipes

Scientific classification
- Domain: Eukaryota
- Kingdom: Animalia
- Phylum: Arthropoda
- Class: Insecta
- Order: Phasmatodea
- Family: Phasmatidae
- Subfamily: Clitumninae
- Tribe: Pharnaciini
- Genus: Phobaeticus; Brunner von Wattenwyl, 1907

Species
- See text

Synonyms
- Baculolonga Hennemann & Conle, 1997; Nearchus Redtenbacher, 1908

= Phobaeticus =

Genus of stick insects

Phobaeticus is a genus of Asian stick insects comprising over 25 species. The genus includes some of the world's longest insects.

Some species of Phobaeticus were formerly included in the genus Pharnacia instead (e.g. Phobaeticus serratipes was known as Pharnacia serratipes).

== Species ==
1. Phobaeticus annamallayanus (Wood-Mason, 1877)
2. Phobaeticus chani Bragg, 2008
3. Phobaeticus decoris Seow-Choen, 2016
4. Phobaeticus foliatus (Bragg, 1995)
5. Phobaeticus grubaueri (Redtenbacher, 1908)
6. Phobaeticus hypharpax (Westwood, 1859)
7. Phobaeticus incertus Brunner von Wattenwyl, 1907
8. Phobaeticus ingens (Redtenbacher, 1908)
9. Phobaeticus kirbyi Brunner von Wattenwyl, 1907
10. Phobaeticus lobulatus (Carl, 1913)
11. Phobaeticus lumawigi Brock, 1998
12. Phobaeticus magnus Hennemann & Conle, 2008
13. Phobaeticus mjobergi (Günther, 1935)
14. Phobaeticus monicachiae Seow-Choen, 2016
15. Phobaeticus palawanensis Hennemann & Conle, 2008
16. Phobaeticus philippinicus (Hennemann & Conle, 1997)
17. Phobaeticus pinnipes (Redtenbacher, 1908)
18. Phobaeticus redtenbacheri (Dohrn, 1910)
19. Phobaeticus serratipes (Gray, 1835)
20. Phobaeticus sinetyi Brunner von Wattenwyl, 1907
21. Phobaeticus sobrinus Brunner von Wattenwyl, 1907 (synonym P. beccarianus) - type species
22. Phobaeticus trui Bresseel & Constant, 2014

=== Reassigned species ===
- P. lambirica, P. rex = Pharnacia rex (Günther, 1928)
- P. sichuanensis = Baculonistria alba Chen & He, 1990
