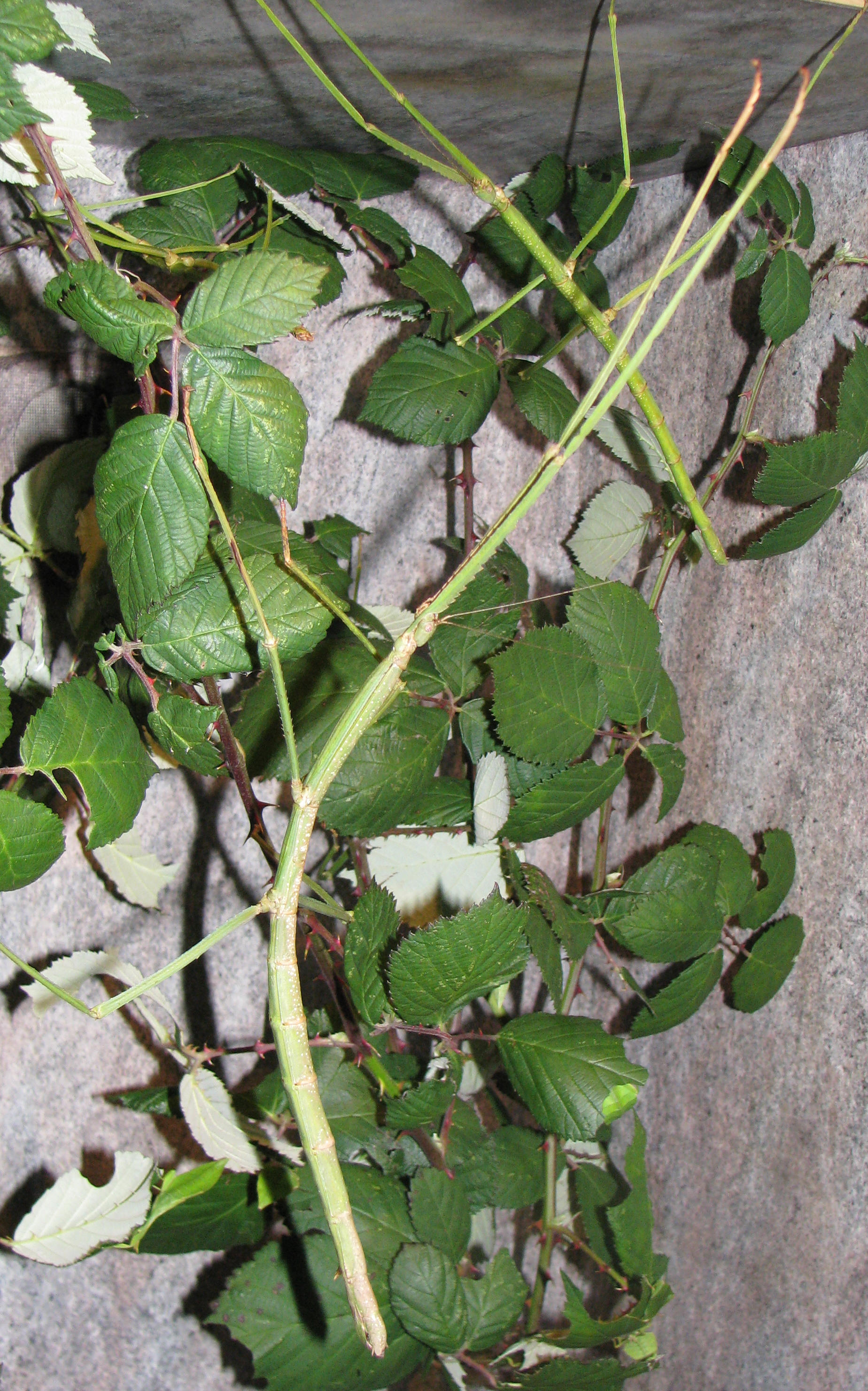

Scientific classification
- Kingdom: Animalia
- Phylum: Arthropoda
- Clade: Pancrustacea
- Class: Insecta
- Order: Phasmatodea
- Family: Phasmatidae
- Genus: Phobaeticus
- Species: P. serratipes

Binomial name
- Phobaeticus serratipes (Gray, 1835)

Synonyms
- Bacteria acanthopus Burmeister, 1838; Baculolonga serratipes (Gray, 1835); Cladoxerus serratipes Gray, 1835; Pharnacia serratipes (Gray, 1835); Phibalosoma serratipes (Gray, 1835); Pharnacia maxima (Bates, 1865); Bactridium grande Rehn, 1920

= Phobaeticus serratipes =

Species of insect

Phobaeticus serratipes (formerly known as Pharnacia serratipes) is a species of stick insect that at one time was the longest known insect, with one female specimen recorded as being 55.5 cm (21.9 in) in total length. This measurement includes the legs fully extended front and rear, and the actual length of the body alone is considerably shorter. This insect is endemic to Peninsular Malaysia, Singapore and Sumatra. It is a popular species among those who raise insects.

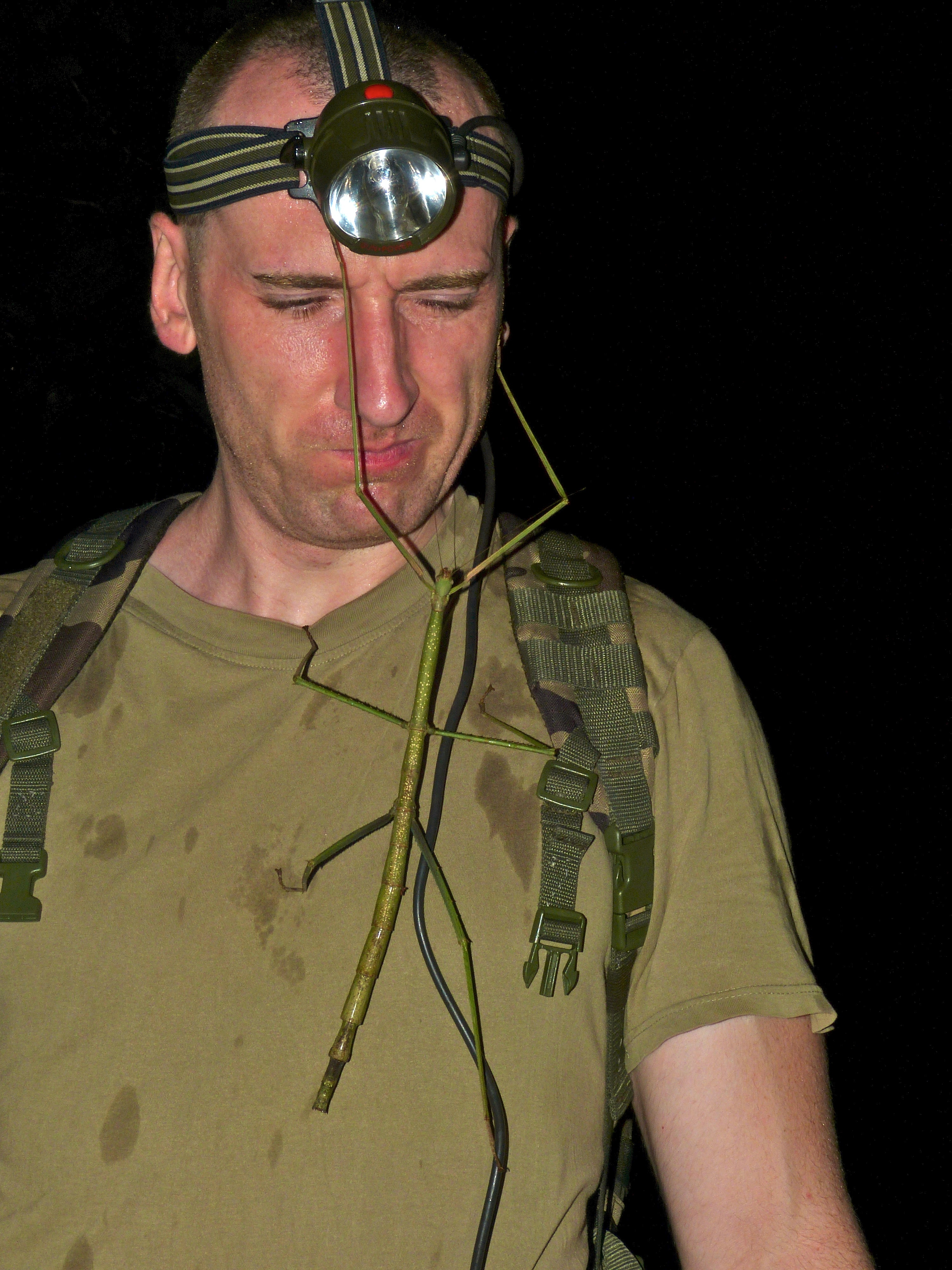
Phobaeticus serratipes climbing on a man

The record for longest known insect is now held by an individual of the stick insect Phryganistria "chinensis" (an informal name for a currently undescribed species) measuring 64 cm (25 in).
