= Phryganistria "chinensis" =

Scientific classification
- Kingdom: Animalia
- Phylum: Arthropoda
- Clade: Pancrustacea
- Class: Insecta
- Order: Phasmatodea
- Family: Phasmatidae
- Tribe: Pharnaciini
- Genus: Phryganistria
- Species: P. "chinensis"

Binomial name
- Phryganistria "chinensis"

Species of stick insect

Phryganistria "chinensis" is an informal name for a currently scientifically undescribed species of stick insect discovered in 2014 near Liuzhou in Guangxi, China. It is the world's longest stick insect, which also makes it the world's longest insect. A wild collected female kept at the Insect Museum of West China in Chengdu was the record holder at 62.4 centimetres (24.6 in) in total length (including extended legs) and 36.1 centimetres (14.2 in) in body length, but it was surpassed by one of its captive-bred young that reached 64 centimetres (25 in) in total length.
