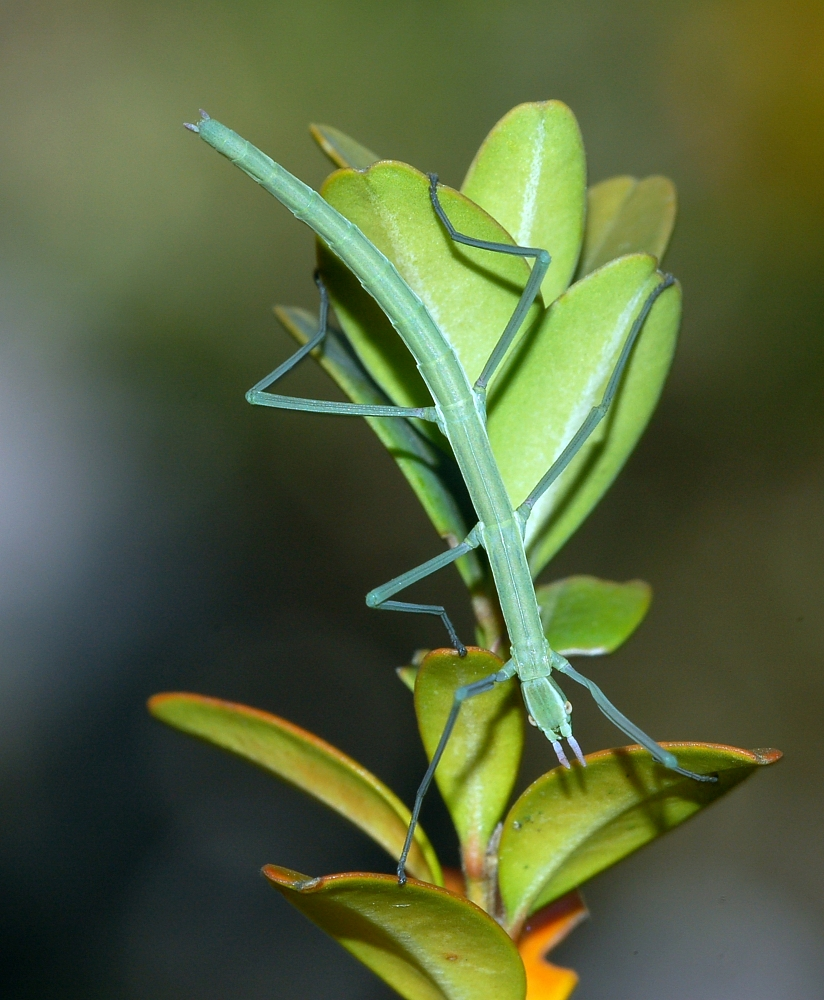
- Pijnackeria hispanica

Scientific classification
- Kingdom: Animalia
- Phylum: Arthropoda
- Clade: Pancrustacea
- Class: Insecta
- Clade: Dicondylia
- Subclass: Pterygota
- Infraclass: Neoptera
- Cohort: Polyneoptera
- Order: Phasmatodea; Jacobson & Bianchi, 1902

Subgroups
- †Susumanioidea; Timematodea; Euphasmatodea (=Verophasmatodea)

= Phasmatodea =

Phasmatodea Temporal range: Middle Jurassic–Recent

Order of stick and leaf insects

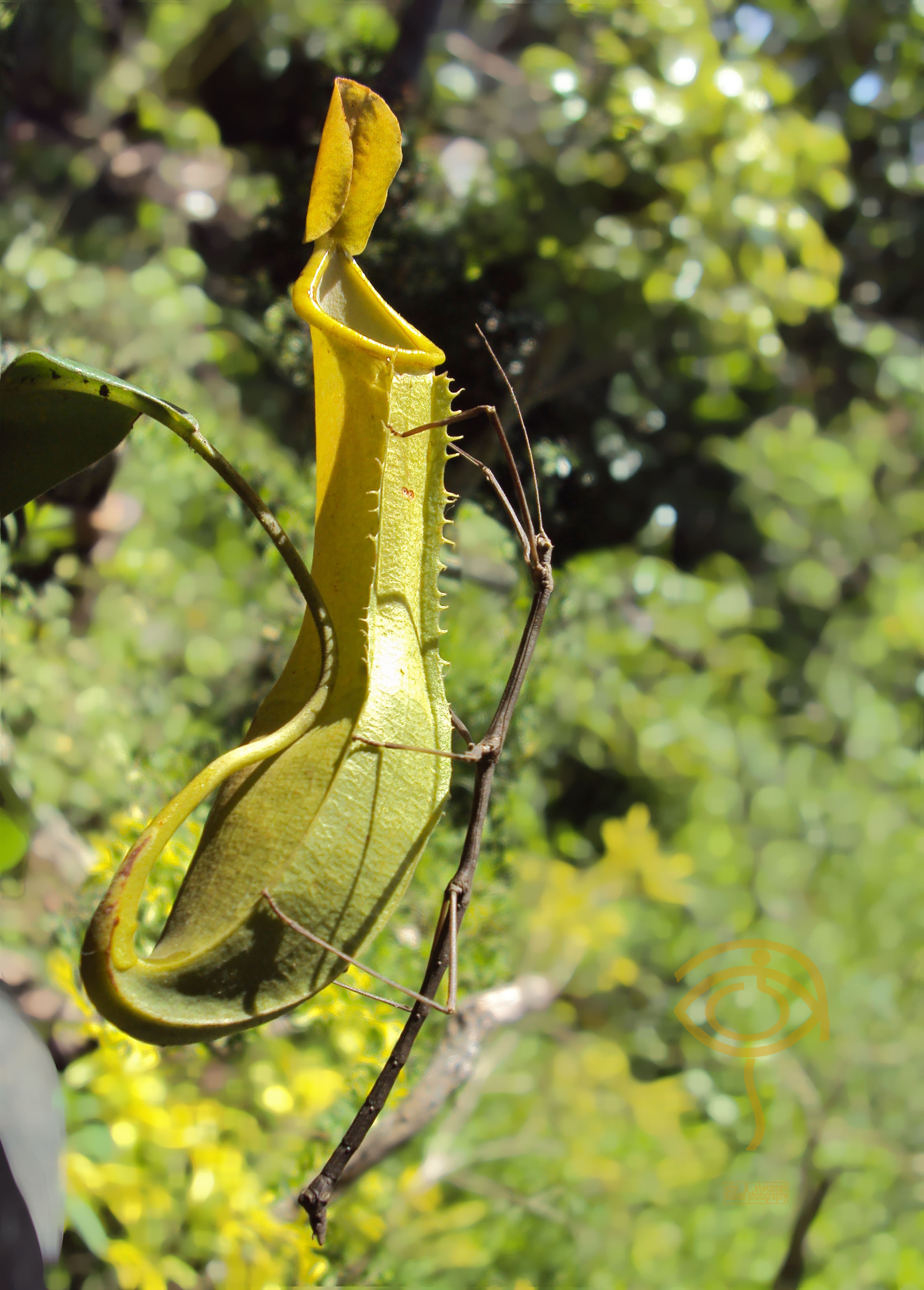
Phasmid in marginal forest on a pitcher plant in the Philippines

The Phasmatodea (also known as Phasmida or Phasmatoptera) are an order of insects whose members are variously known as stick insects, stick bugs, walkingsticks, stick animals, or bug sticks. They are also occasionally referred to as Devil's darning needles, although this name is shared by both dragonflies and crane flies. They can be generally referred to as phasmatodeans, phasmids, or ghost insects, with phasmids in the family Phylliidae called leaf insects, leaf-bugs, walking leaves, or bug leaves. The order name is derived from the Ancient Greek φάσμα (phásma), meaning "apparition, phantom", referring to their resemblance to vegetation while in fact being animals. Their natural camouflage makes them difficult for predators to detect; still, many species have one of several secondary lines of defense in the form of startle displays, spines or toxic secretions. Stick insects from the genera Phryganistria, Ctenomorpha, and Phobaeticus include the world's longest insects.

Members of the order are found on all continents except Antarctica, and they are most abundant in the tropics and subtropics. They are herbivorous, with many species living unobtrusively in the tree canopy. They are also nocturnal and are usually found feeding under leaves during twilight or midnight. During the day, their camouflage aids them in remaining undetected by predators which rely on sight, such as birds. They have an incomplete metamorphosis life cycle with three stages: egg, nymph and adult. Many phasmids are parthenogenic or androgenetic, and do not require fertilized eggs for female offspring to be produced. In hotter climates, they may breed all year round; in more temperate regions, the females lay eggs in the autumn before dying, and the new generation hatches in the spring. Some species have wings and can disperse by flying, while others are more restricted.

== Description ==
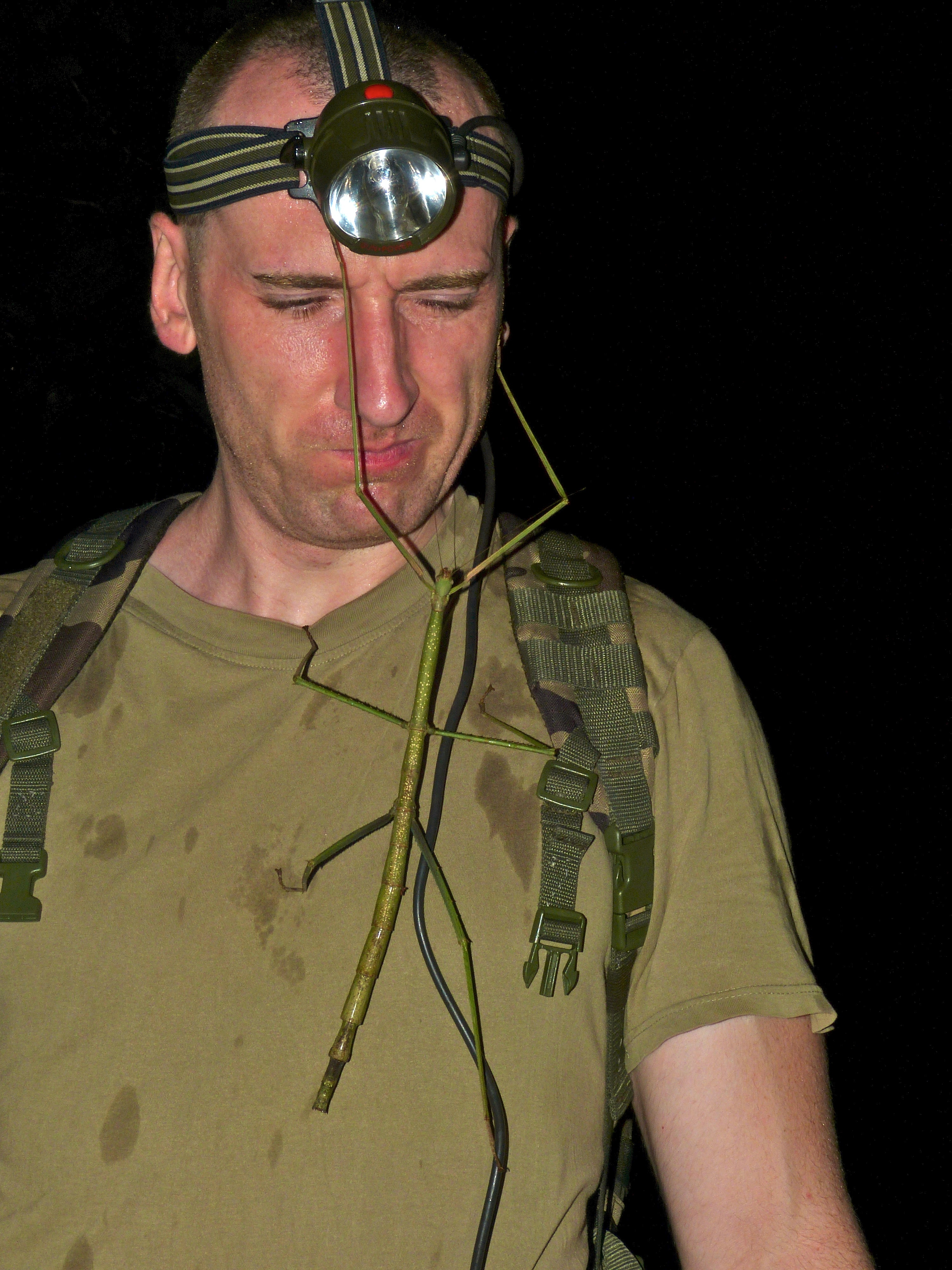
Phobaeticus serratipes

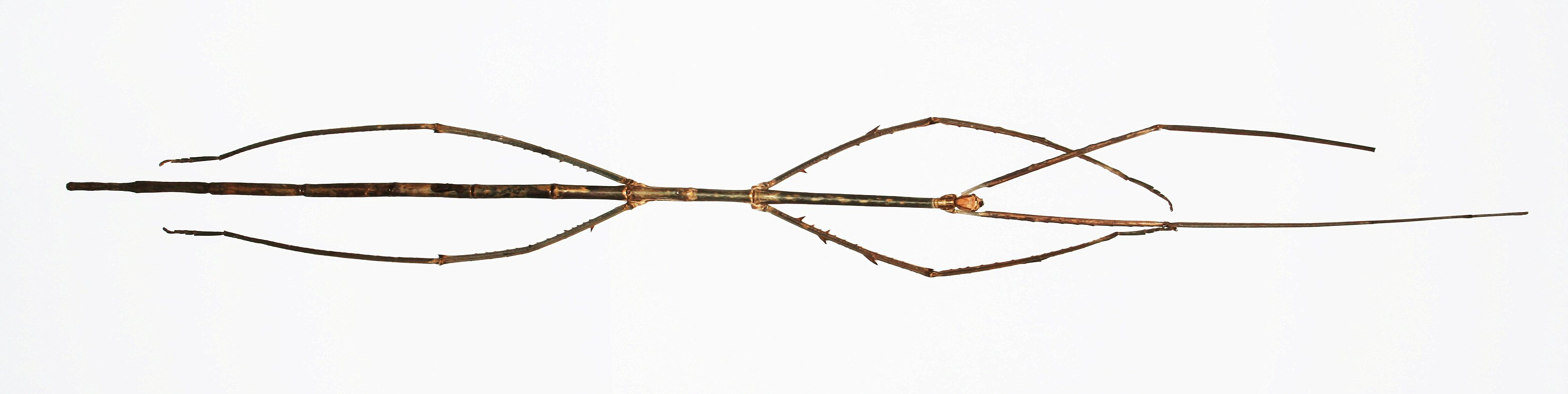
Female Phobaeticus chani, the world's second-longest insect. This species grows to a total length of 56.7 cm (22.3 in) (front legs fully extended) and body length of 35.7 cm (14.1 in).

Phasmids vary greatly in size, with females typically growing larger than males of the same species. Males of the smallest species, such as Timema cristinae, reach about 2 centimetres (0.8 in) long, while females of the longest, an undescribed species informally known as Phryganistria "chinensis", can be up to 64 centimetres (25 in) in total length, including outstretched legs. This makes it the world's longest insect. The heaviest species of phasmid is likely to be Heteropteryx dilatata, the females of which may weigh as much as 65 g (2.3 oz).

Some phasmids have cylindrical stick-like shapes, while others have flattened, leaflike shapes. Many species are wingless, or have reduced wings. The thorax is long in the winged species, since it houses the flight muscles, and is typically much shorter in the wingless forms. Where present, the first pair of wings is narrow and cornified (hardened), while the hind wings are broad, with straight veins along their length and multiple cross-veins. Their wing venation is unique among insects. The body is often further adapted to resemble vegetation, with ridges resembling leaf veins, bark-like tubercles, and other forms of camouflage. A few species, such as Carausius morosus, are even able to change their pigmentation to match their surroundings. The mouthparts project out from the head. Chewing mandibles are uniform across species. The legs are typically long and slender, and some species are capable of limb autotomy (appendage shedding). Phasmids have long, slender antennae, as long as or longer than the rest of the body in some species.

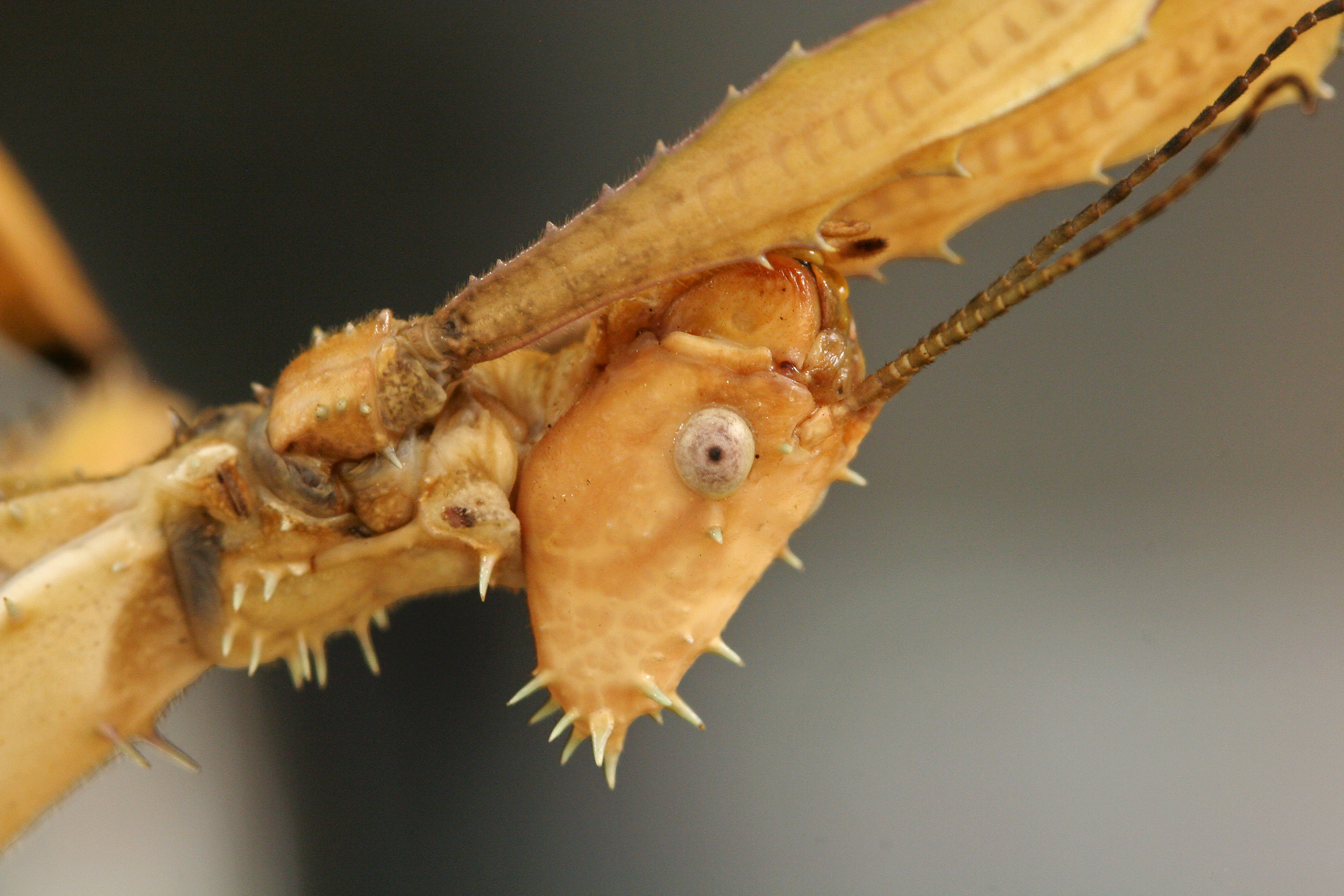
Head of a female Extatosoma tiaratum

All phasmids possess compound eyes, but ocelli (light-sensitive organs) are only known from the five groups Lanceocercata, Necrosciinae, Pseudophasmatidae, Palophidae and Phylliidae. Of these only the first three groups have females with ocelli, which like the wings seems to have re-evolved from ancestors that had lost them. Phasmids have an impressive visual system that allows them to perceive significant detail even in dim conditions, which suits their typically nocturnal lifestyle. They are born equipped with tiny compound eyes with a limited number of facets. As phasmids grow through successive molts, the number of facets in each eye is increased along with the number of photoreceptor cells. The sensitivity of the adult eye is at least tenfold that of the nymph in its first instar (developmental stage). As the eye grows more complex, the mechanisms to adapt to dark/light changes are also enhanced: eyes in dark conditions evidence fewer screening pigments, which would block light, than during the daytime, and changes in the width of the retinal layer to adapt to changes in available light are significantly more pronounced in adults. The larger size of the adult insects' eyes makes them more prone to radiation damage. This explains why fully grown individuals are mostly nocturnal. Lessened sensitivity to light in the newly emerged insects helps them to escape from the leaf litter wherein they are hatched and move upward into the more brightly illuminated foliage. Young stick insects are diurnal (daytime) feeders and move around freely, expanding their foraging range.

Stick insects have two types of pads on their legs: sticky "toe pads" and non-stick "heel pads" a little further up their legs. The heel pads are covered in microscopic hairs which create strong friction at low pressure, enabling them to grip without having to be peeled energetically from the surface at each step. The sticky toe pads are used to provide additional grip when climbing but are not used on a level surface.

== Distribution ==
Phasmatodea can be found all over the world except for the Antarctic and Patagonia. They are most numerous in the tropics and subtropics. The greatest diversity is found in Southeast Asia and South America, followed by Australia, Central America, and the southern United States. Over 300 species are known from the island of Borneo, making it the richest place in the world for Phasmatodea.

== Anti-predator adaptations ==
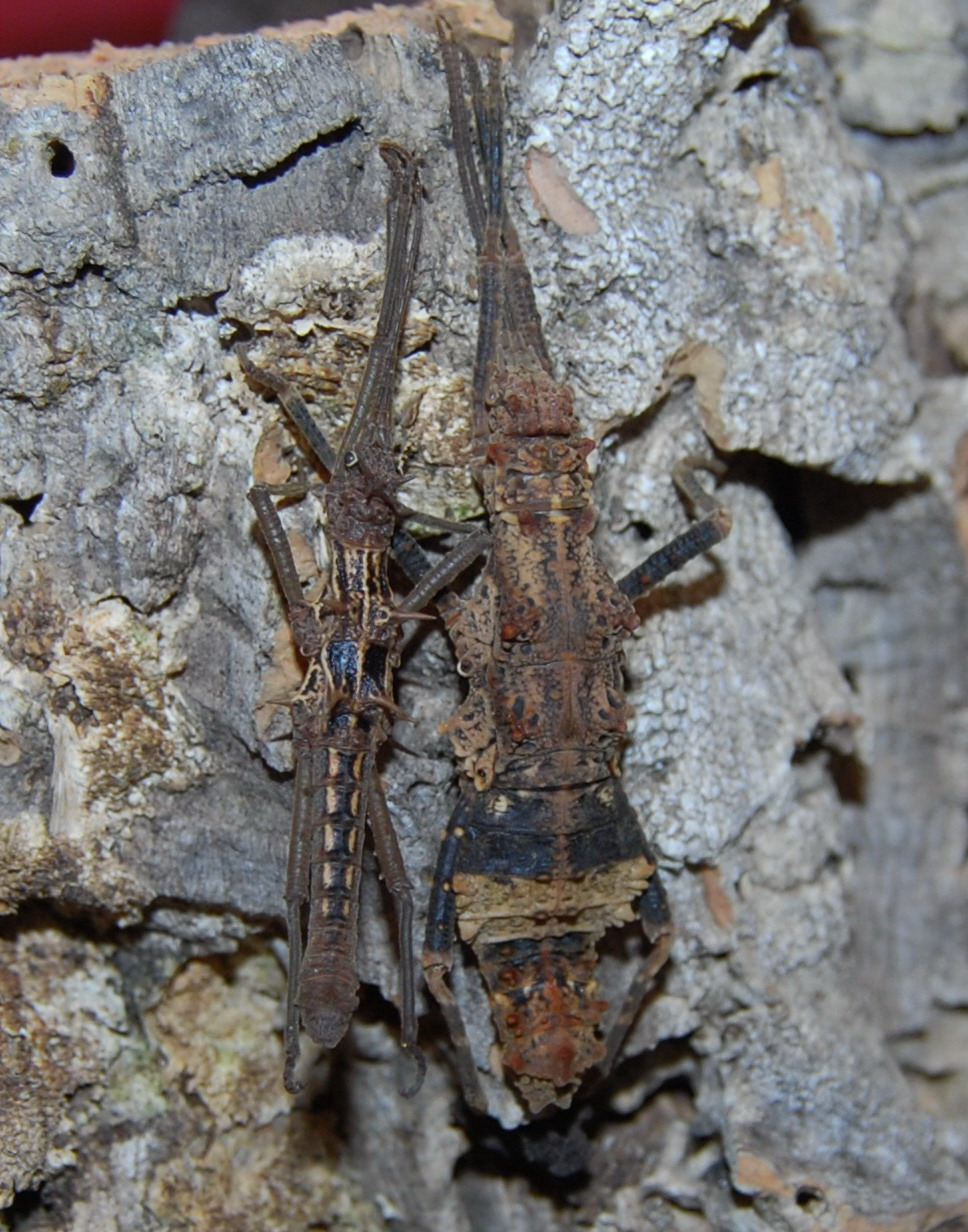
A pair of camouflaged Dares ulula

Phasmatodea species exhibit mechanisms for defense from predators that prevent an attack from happening in the first place (primary defense), and defenses that are deployed after an attack has been initiated (secondary defense).

The defense mechanism most readily identifiable with Phasmatodea is camouflage, in the form of a plant mimicry. Most phasmids are known for effectively replicating the forms of sticks and leaves, and the bodies of some species (such as Pseudodiacantha macklotti and Bactrododema centaurum) are covered in mossy or lichenous outgrowths that supplement their disguise. Remaining absolutely stationary enhances their inconspicuousness. Some species have the ability to change color as their surroundings shift (Bostra scabrinota, Timema californica). In a further behavioral adaptation to supplement crypsis, a number of species perform a rocking motion where the body is swayed from side to side; this is thought to mimic the movement of leaves or twigs swaying in the breeze. Another method by which stick insects avoid predation and resemble twigs is by entering a cataleptic state, where the insect adopts a rigid, motionless posture that can be maintained for a long period. The nocturnal feeding habits of adults also help Phasmatodea to remain concealed from predators.

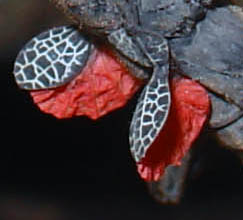
Hindwing deimatic (startle) display of a male Peruphasma schultei

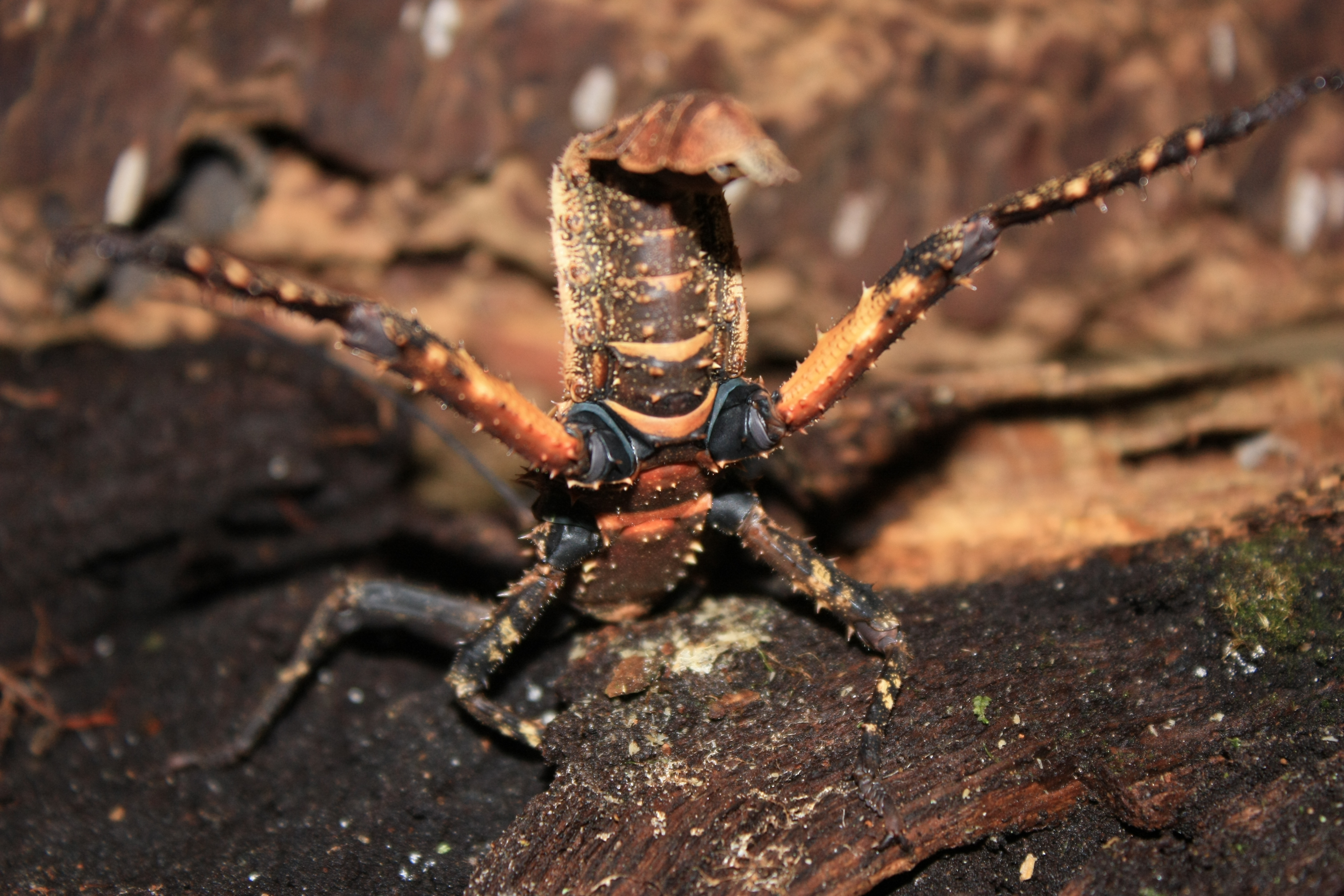
Defensive pose of a subadult female Haaniella dehaanii

In a seemingly different method of defense, many species of Phasmatodea seek to startle the encroaching predator by flashing bright colors that are normally hidden, and making a loud noise. When disturbed on a branch or foliage, some species, while dropping to the undergrowth to escape, will open their wings momentarily during free fall to display bright colors that disappear when the insect lands. Others will maintain their display for up to 20 minutes, hoping to frighten the predator and convey the appearance of a larger size. Some, such as Pterinoxylus spinulosus, accompany the visual display with the noise made by rubbing together parts of the wings.

Some species, such as the young nymphs of Extatosoma tiaratum, have been observed to curl the abdomen upwards over the body and head to resemble ants or scorpions in an act of mimicry, another defense mechanism by which the insects avoid becoming prey. The eggs of some species such as Diapheromera femorata have fleshy projections resembling elaiosomes (fleshy structures sometimes attached to seeds) that attract ants. When the egg has been carried to the colony, the adult ant feeds the elaiosome to a larva while the phasmid egg is left to develop in the recesses of the nest in a protected environment.

When threatened, some phasmids that are equipped with femoral spines on the metathoracic legs (Oncotophasma martini, Eurycantha calcarata, Eurycantha horrida, Diapheromera veliei, Diapheromera covilleae, Heteropteryx dilatata) respond by curling the abdomen upward and repeatedly swinging the legs together, grasping at the threat. If the menace is caught, the spines can, in humans, draw blood and inflict considerable pain.

Some species are equipped with a pair of glands at the anterior (front) edge of the prothorax that enables the insect to release defensive secretions, including chemical compounds of varying effect: some produce distinct odors, and others can cause a stinging, burning sensation in the eyes and mouth of a predator. The spray often contains pungent-smelling volatile metabolites, previously thought to be concentrated in the insect from its plant food sources. However, it now seems more likely that the insect manufactures its own defensive chemicals. Additionally, the chemistry of the defense spray from at least one species, Anisomorpha buprestoides, has been shown to vary based on the insect's life stage or the particular population it is part of. This chemical spray variation also corresponds with regionally specific color forms in populations in Florida, with the different variants having distinct behaviors. The spray from one species, Megacrania nigrosulfurea, is used as a treatment for skin infections by a tribe in Papua New Guinea because of its antibacterial constituents. Some species employ a shorter-range defensive secretion, where individuals bleed reflexively through the joints of their legs and the seams of the exoskeleton when bothered, allowing the blood (hemolymph), which contains distasteful compounds, to discourage predators. Another ploy is to regurgitate their stomach contents when harassed, repelling potential predators.

== Life cycle ==
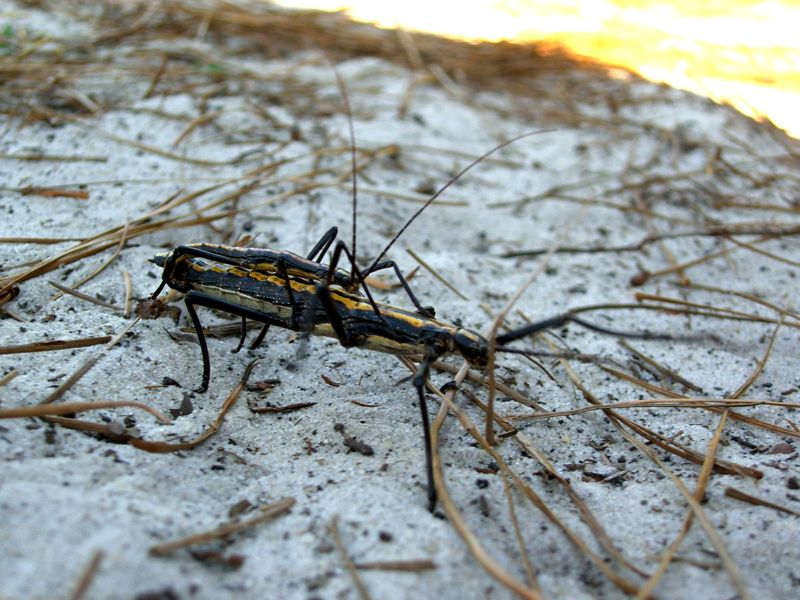
Mating pair of Anisomorpha buprestoides

The life cycle of the stick insect begins when the female deposits her eggs through one of these methods of oviposition: she will either flick her egg to the ground by a movement of the ovipositor or her entire abdomen, carefully place the eggs in the axils of the host plant, bury them in small pits in the soil, or stick the eggs to a substrate, usually a stem or leaf of the food plant. A single female lays from 100 to 1,200 eggs after mating, depending on the species.

Many species of phasmids are parthenogenic, meaning the females lay eggs without needing to mate with males to produce offspring. Eggs from virgin mothers are entirely female and hatch into nymphs that are exact copies of their mothers. Stick insect species that are the product of hybridisation are usually obligate parthenogens, but non-hybrids are facultative parthenogens, meaning they retain the ability to mate and their sexual behavior depends on the presence and abundance of males.

Reproduction by androgenesis has also been recorded in stick insects of the genus Bacillus such as Bacillus rossius and Bacillus grandii.

Phasmatodea eggs resemble seeds in shape and size and have hard shells. They have a lid-like structure called an operculum at the anterior pole, from which the nymph emerges during hatching. The eggs vary in the length of time before they hatch which varies from 13 to more than 70 days, with the average around 20 to 30 days. Some species, particularly those from temperate regions, undergo diapause, where development is delayed during the winter months. Diapause is initiated by the effect of short day lengths on the egg-laying adults or can be genetically determined. Diapause is broken by exposure to the cold of winter, causing the eggs to hatch during the following spring. Among species of economic importance such as Diapheromera femorata, diapause results in the development of two-year cycles of outbreaks.

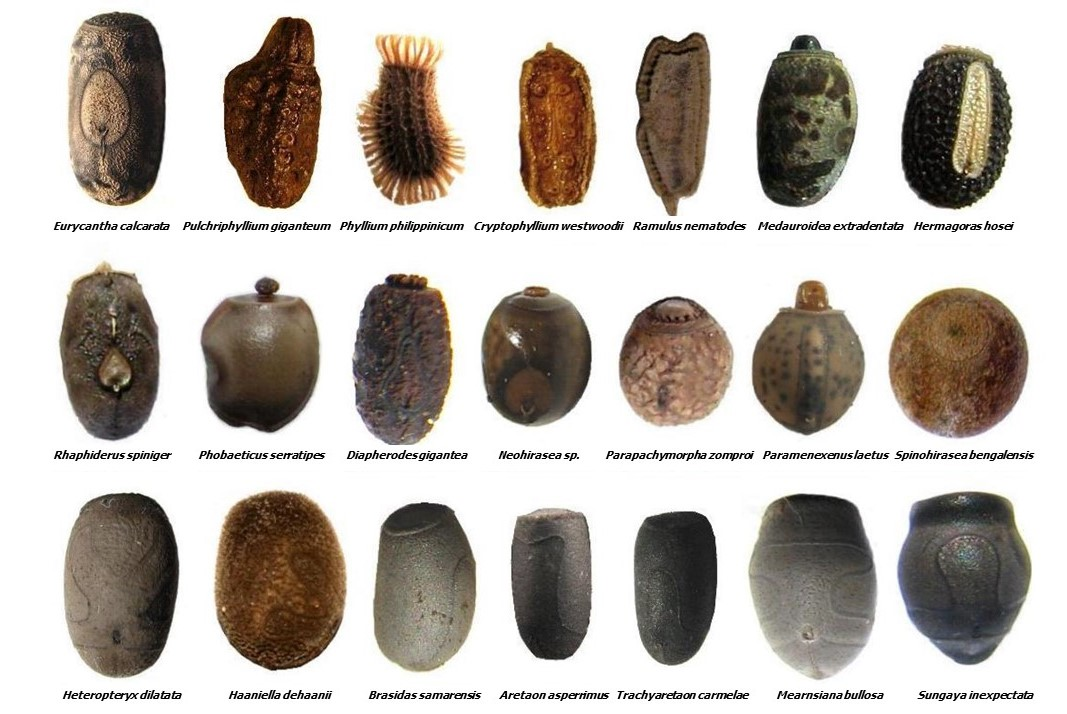
Eggs of various phasmid species (not to scale)

Many species' eggs bear a fatty, knoblike capitulum that caps the operculum. This structure attracts ants because of its resemblance to the elaiosome of some plant seeds that are sought-after food sources for ant larvae, and usually contribute to ensuring seed dispersal by ants, a form of ant-plant mutualism called myrmecochory. The ants take the egg into their nest underground and can remove the capitulum to feed to their larvae without harming the phasmid embryo. There, the egg hatches and the young nymph, which initially resembles an ant (another instance of mimicry among Phasmatodea), eventually emerges from the nest and climbs the nearest tree to safety in the foliage. The eggs of stick insects have a coating of calcium oxalate which makes them survive unscathed in the digestive tract of birds. It has been suggested that birds may have a role in the dispersal of parthenogenetic stick insect species, especially to islands.

The Phasmatodea life cycle is hemimetabolous, proceeding through a series of several nymphal instars. Once emerged, a nymph will eat its cast skin. Adulthood is reached for most species after several months and many molts. The lifespan of Phasmatodea varies by species, but ranges from a few months to up to three years.

== Ecology ==
Phasmids are herbivorous, feeding mostly on the leaves of trees and shrubs, and a conspicuous component of many Neotropical systems. Phasmatodea has been postulated as dominant light-gap herbivores there. Their role in the forest ecosystem is considered important by many scientists, who stress the significance of light gaps in maintaining succession and resilience in climax forests. The presence of phasmids lowers the net production of early successional plants by consuming them and then enriches the soil by defecation. This enables the late succession plants to become established and encourages the recycling of the tropical forest.

Phasmatodea are recognized as injurious to forest and shade trees by defoliation. Didymuria violescens, Podacanthus wilkinsoni and Ctenomorphodes tessulatus in Australia, Diapheromera femorata in North America and Graeffea crouani in coconut plantations in the South Pacific all occur in outbreaks of economic importance. In the American South, as well as in Michigan and Wisconsin, the walking stick is a significant problem in parks and recreation sites, where it consumes the foliage of oaks and other hardwoods. Severe outbreaks of the walking stick, Diapheromera femorata, have occurred in the Ouachita Mountains of Arkansas and Oklahoma. The insects eat the entire leaf blade. In the event of heavy outbreaks, entire stands of trees can be completely denuded. Continuous defoliation over several years often results in the death of the tree. Because these species cannot fly, infestations are typically contained to a radius of a few hundred yards. Nevertheless, the damage incurred to parks in the region is often costly. Control efforts in the case of infestations have typically involved chemical pesticides; ground fires are effective at killing eggs but have obvious disadvantages. In New South Wales, research has investigated the feasibility of controlling stick insects using natural enemies such as parasitic wasps (Myrmecomimesis spp.).

== Taxonomy ==
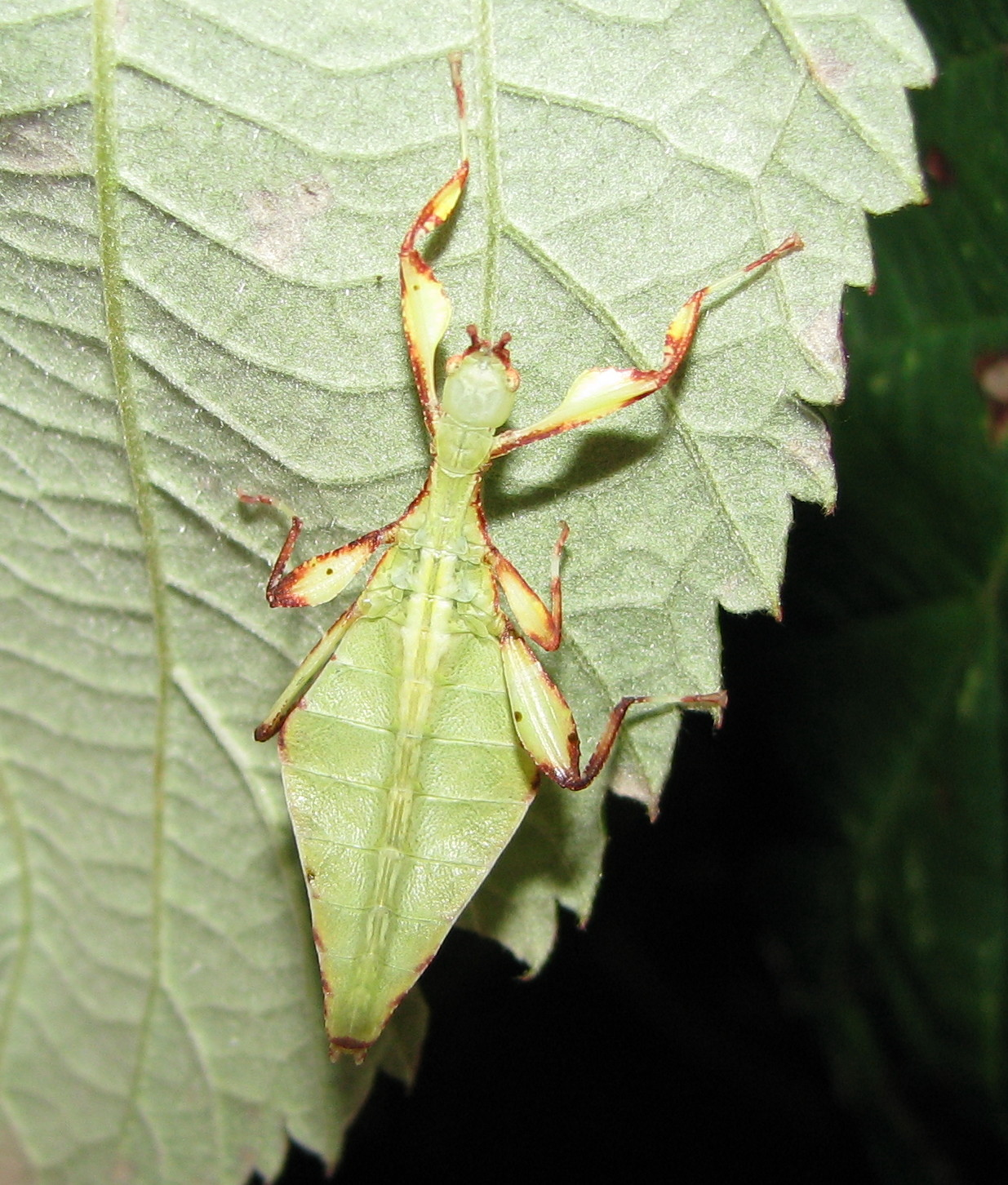
True leaf insects, like this Phyllium bilobatum, belong to the family Phylliidae.

The classification of the Phasmatodea is complex and the relationships between its members are poorly understood. Furthermore, there is much confusion over the ordinal name. Phasmida is preferred by many authors, though it is incorrectly formed; Phasmatodea is correctly formed, and is widely accepted. However, Brock and Marshall argue:

Phasmida is the oldest and simplest name, first used by Leach in 1815 in "Brewster's Edinburgh Encyclopaedia" volume 9, p. 119, and widely used in major entomological textbooks, dictionaries and many scientific papers and books on phasmids. As there is no compulsion to select the "grammatically correct" name [which some argue is Phasmatodea Jacobson & Bianchi, 1902], selection of a long established (and simple) name is reasonable, although the probability of persuading all colleagues to agree on the use of Phasmida is unlikely.

The order Phasmatodea is sometimes considered to be related to other orders, including the Blattodea, Mantodea, Grylloblattodea, Mantophasmatodea and Dermaptera, but the affiliations are uncertain and the grouping (sometimes referred to as "Orthopteroidea") may be paraphyletic (not have a common ancestor) and hence invalid in the traditional circumscription (set of attributes that all members have). Phasmatodea, once considered a suborder of Orthoptera, is now treated as an order of its own. Anatomical features separate them as a monophyletic (descended from a common ancestor) group from the Orthoptera. One is the instance among all species of Phasmatodea of a pair of exocrine glands inside the prothorax used for defense. Another is the presence of a specially formed sclerite (hardened plate), called a vomer, which allows the male to clasp the female during mating.

The order is divided into two, or sometimes three, suborders. The traditional division is into the suborder groups Anareolatae and Areolatae, which are distinguished according to whether the insect has sunken areola, or circular areas, on the underside of the apices of the middle and hind tibiae (Areolate) or not (Anareolate). However the phylogenetic (evolutionary) relationships between the different groups is poorly resolved. The monophyly of Anareolatae has been questioned and the morphology of the eggs may be a better basis for classification. An alternative is to divide the Phasmatodea into three suborders Agathemerodea (1 genus and 8 species), Timematodea (1 genus and 21 species) and Euphasmatodea (or Verophasmatodea) for the remaining taxa. This division is, however, not fully supported by the molecular studies, which recover Agathemerodea as nested within Euphasmatodea rather than being the sister group of the latter group. Recent taxonomic treatments recognise two suborders, with Agathemeridae placed in Pseudophasmatoidea within Euphasmatodea and Agathemerodea treated as nomen dubium

While suggestions have been made that various insects extending back to the Permian epoch represent stem-group phasmatodeans, the earliest unambiguous members of the group are the Susumanioidea, which first appeared during the Middle Jurassic, and usually have two large pairs of wings. Modern phasmatodeans first appeared during the Early Cretaceous, with the currently oldest known being Araripephasma from the Early Cretaceous (Aptian) Crato Formation of Brazil, around 113 million years old, which can be confidently assigned to the Euphasmatodea.

The earliest leaf insect (Phylliinae) fossil is Eophyllium messelensis from the 47-million-year-old Eocene of Messel, Germany. In size and cryptic (leaflike) body form, it closely resembles extant species, suggesting that the behavior of the group has changed little since that time.

Over 3,500 species have been described, with many more yet to be described both in museum collections and in the wild.

Suborders	No. of species	Defining notes	Image
Timematodea	21	Considered earliest to branch from phylogenetic tree	Timema dorotheae
Euphasmatodea	3514	Vast majority of extant species	Phasma gigas

== Select species ==
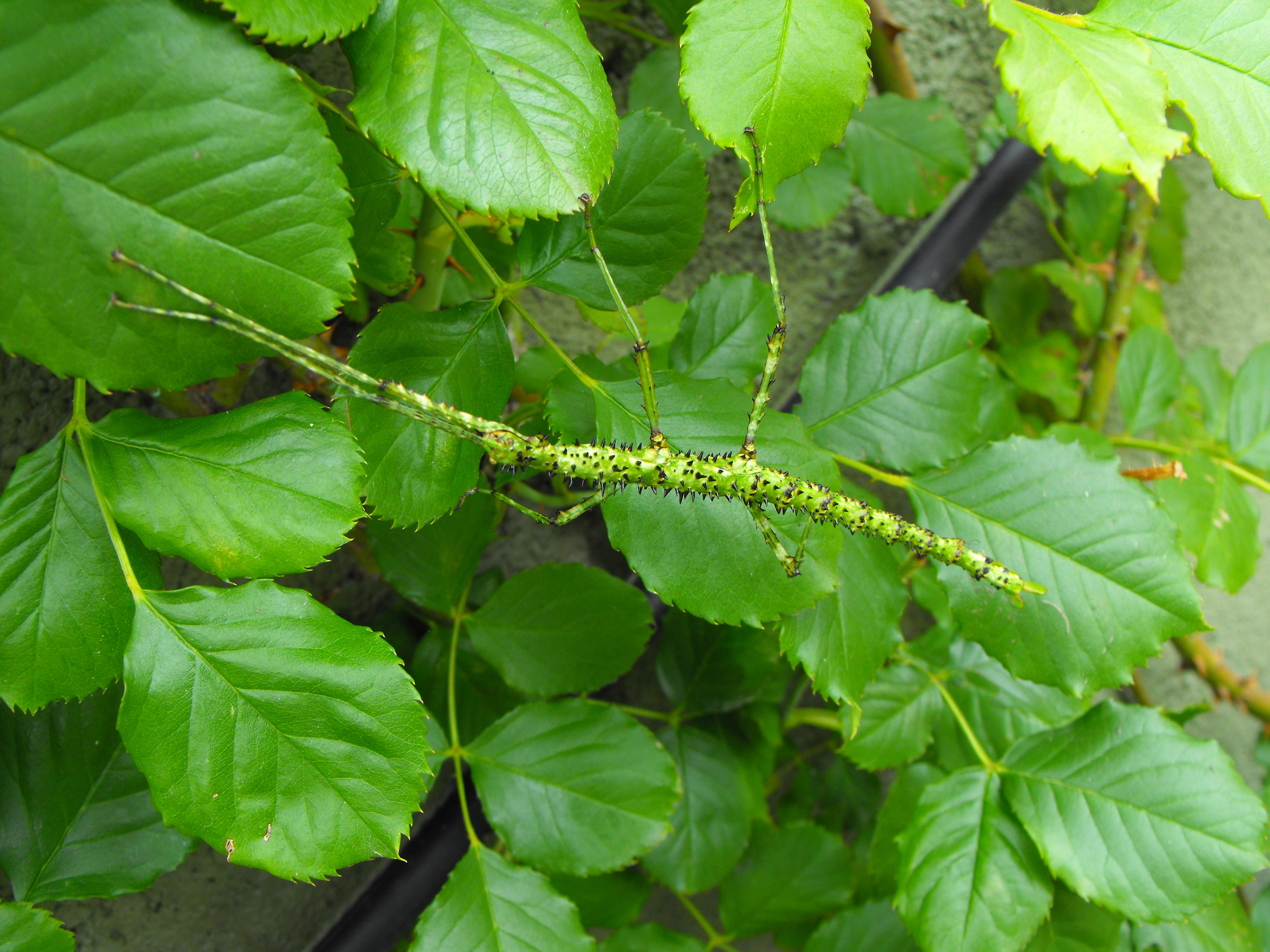
Acanthoxyla prasina, or the prickly stick insect, native to New Zealand, is believed to reproduce by parthenogenesis; no males were recorded until 2016, when a single male was discovered in the UK where this lineage has been introduced.

One Australian species, the Lord Howe Island stick insect or tree lobster, is now listed as critically endangered. It was believed extinct until its rediscovery on the rock known as Ball's Pyramid. An effort is underway in Australia to rear this species in captivity.

The best known of the stick insects is the Indian or laboratory stick insect (Carausius morosus). This insect grows to roughly 10 cm (4 in) and reproduces parthenogenically, and although males have been recorded, they are rare.

Fossils of the extinct genus and species Eoprephasma hichensi have been recovered from Ypresian age sediments in the U.S. state of Washington and British Columbia, Canada. The species is one of the youngest members of the stem phasmatodean group Susumanioidea.

Numerous species of phasmid rank among the largest and heaviest insects; the species Phryganistria "chinensis" of Guangxi, Phobaeticus chani and Phobaeticus kirbyi of Borneo, Ctenomorpha gargantua of northern Queensland, and Phobaeticus serratipes of Peninsular Malaysia and Sumatra are among the longest, while the species Heteropteryx dilatata of Peninsular Malaysia, Sumatra, and Thailand, the aforementioned Lord Howe Island stick insect of Lord Howe Island, and Acrophylla alta of Queensland are among the heaviest.

=== European species ===
In Europe there are 17 species of stick insects described, belonging to the genera Bacillus Clonopsis, Leptynia and Pijnackeria. There are also a few other species that live in Europe but are introduced, as for example with a couple of species of Acanthoxyla, which are native to New Zealand but are present in southern England.

In the Iberian Peninsula there are currently described 13 species and several subspecies. Their life cycle is annual, living only during the hottest months (especially genera Leptynia and Pijnackeria), which usually means late spring to early autumn.

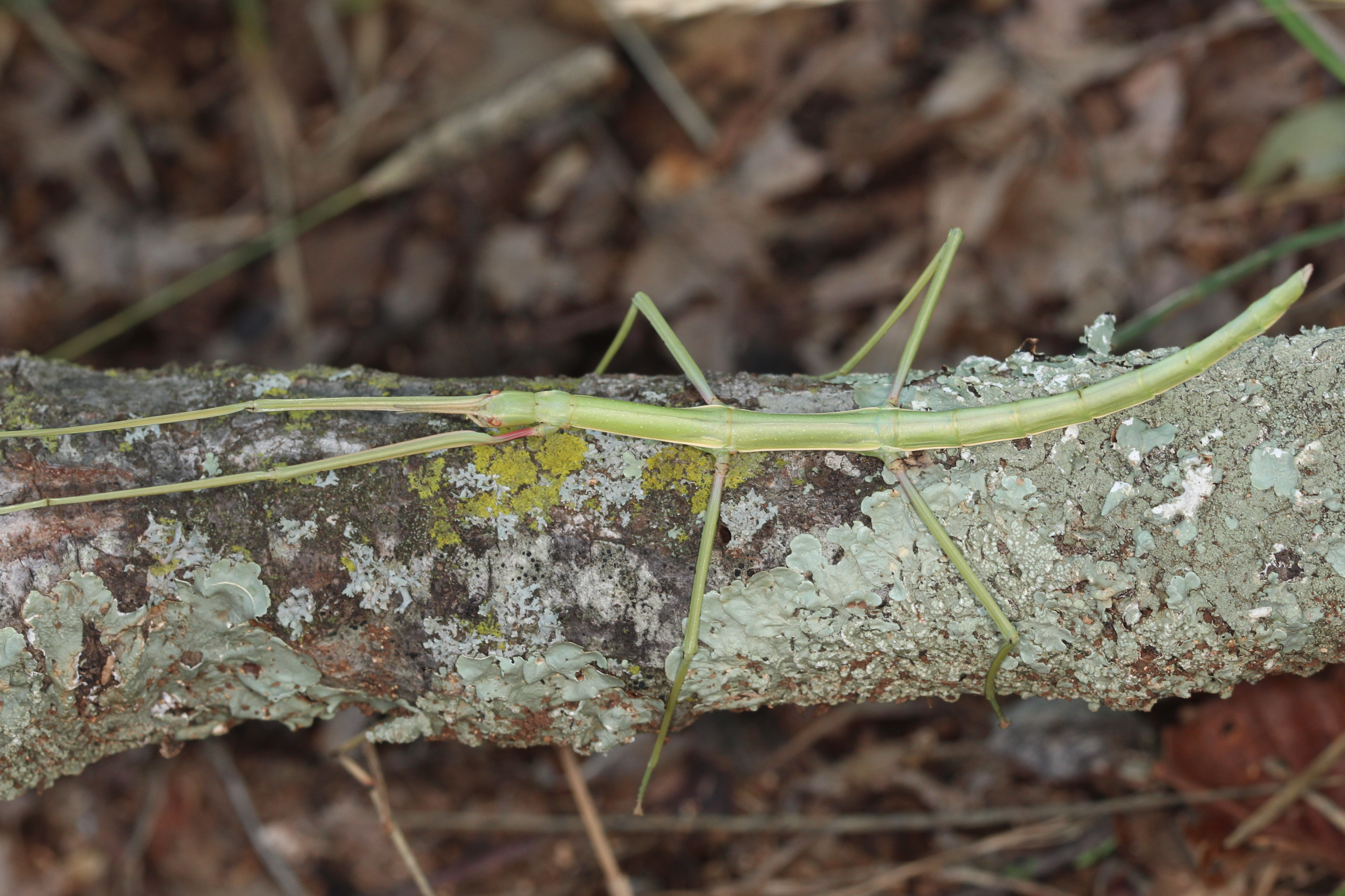
Bacillus rossius

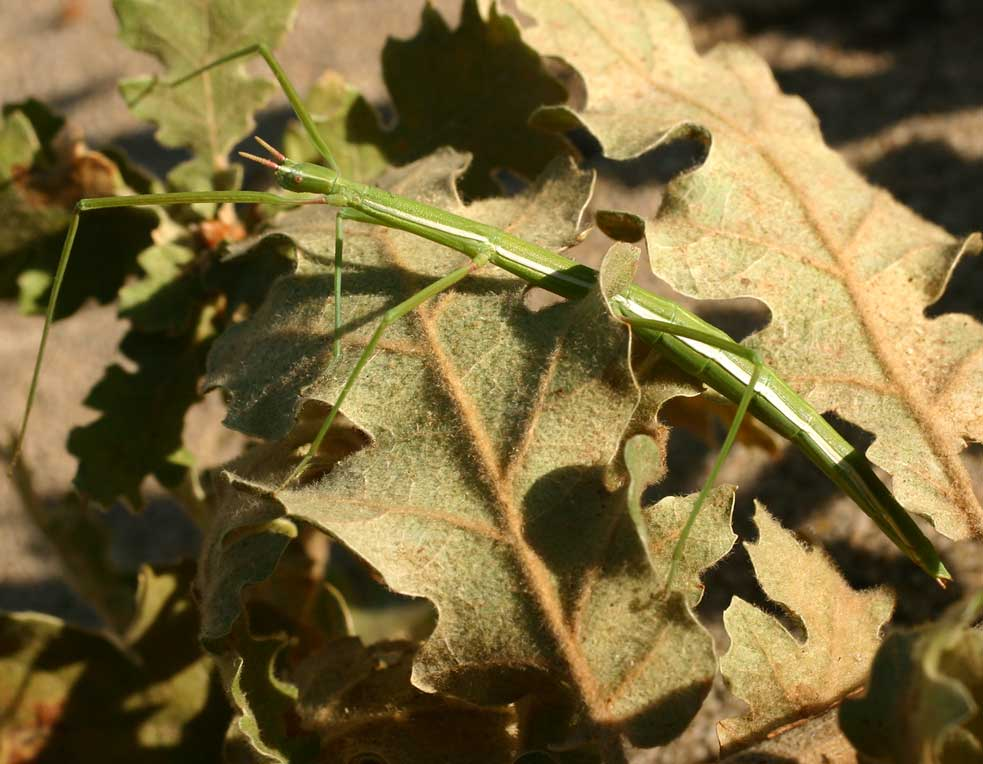
Clonopsis gallica

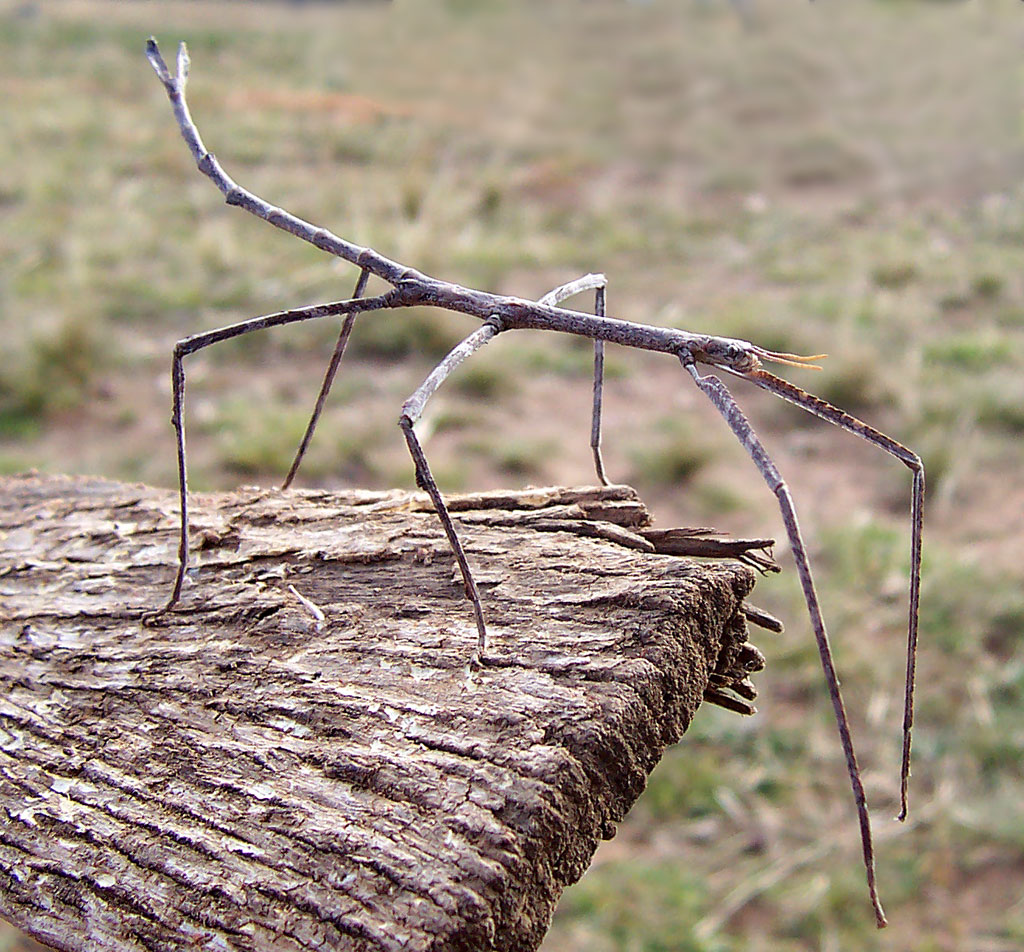
Ctenomorpha marginipennis

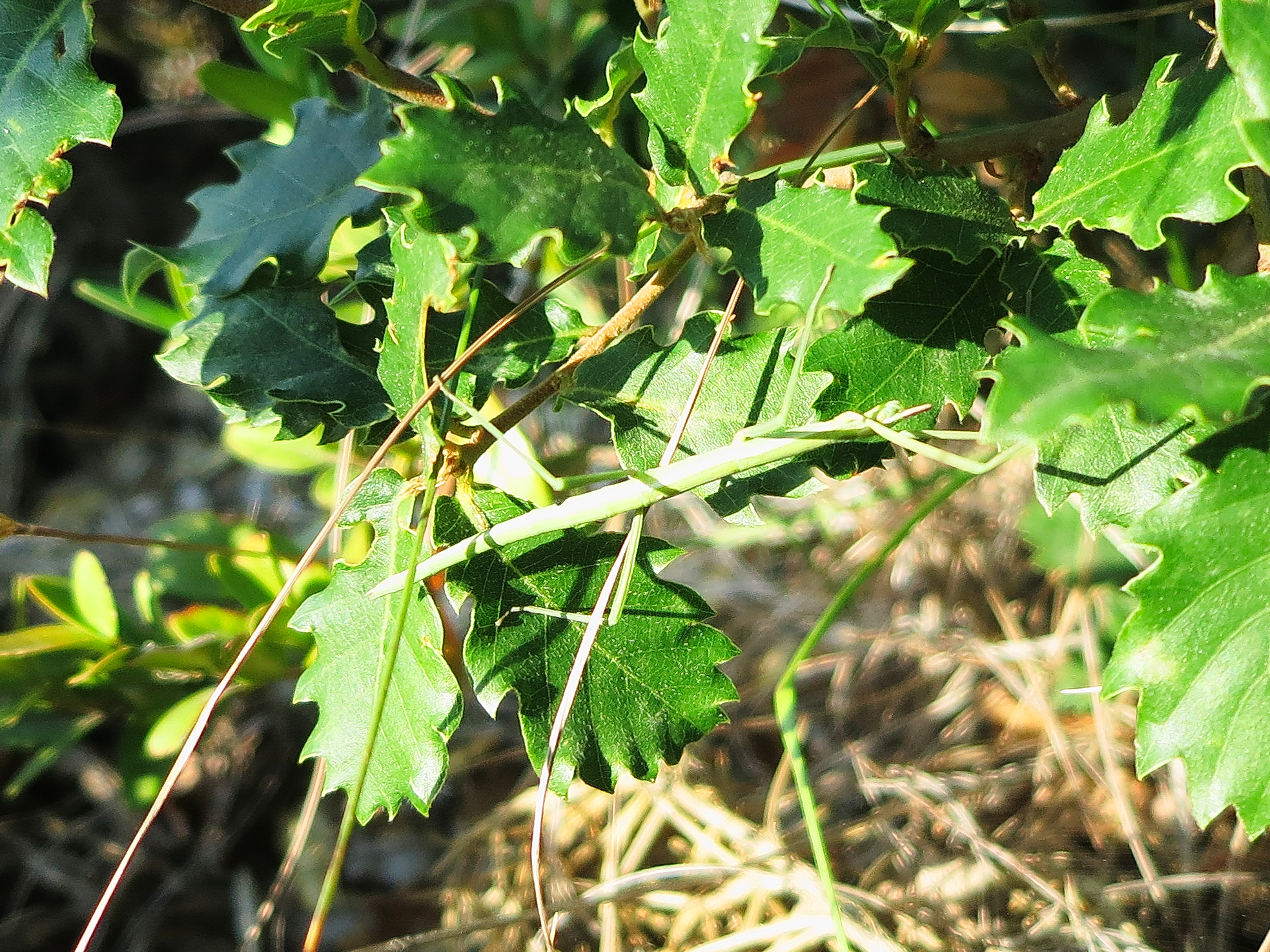
Leptynia hispanica

== Behavior ==
Video of a walking phasmid

Stick insects, like praying mantises, show rocking behavior in which the insect makes rhythmic, repetitive, side-to-side movements. The common interpretation of this behavior's function is it enhances crypsis by mimicking vegetation moving in the wind. These movements may also be important in allowing the insects to discriminate objects from the background by relative motion. Rocking movements by these generally sedentary insects may replace flying or running as a source of relative motion to help them discern objects in the foreground.

Mating behavior in Phasmatodea is impressive because of the extraordinarily long duration of some pairings. A record among insects, the stick insect Necroscia sparaxes, found in India, is sometimes coupled for 79 days at a time. It is not uncommon for this species to assume the mating posture for days or weeks on end, and among some species (Diapheromera veliei and D. covilleae), pairing can last three to 136 hours in captivity.

Overt displays of aggression between males over mates suggests that extended pairing may have evolved to guard females from sperm competition. Fighting between competing males has been observed in the species D. veiliei and D. covilleae. During these encounters, the approach of a challenger causes the existing mate to manipulate the female's abdomen, which he has clasped by means of the clasping organ, or vomer, down upon itself to block the site of attachment. Occasionally, the consort will strike out at the competitor with the mid femora, which are equipped with an enlarged and hooked spine in both sexes that can draw the blood of the opponent when they are flexed against the body to puncture the integument. Usually, a strong hold on the female's abdomen and blows to the intruder are enough to deter the unwanted competition, but occasionally the competitor has been observed to employ a sneaky tactic to inseminate the female. While the first mate is engaged in feeding and is forced to vacate the dorsal position, the intruder can clasp the female's abdomen and insert his genitalia. If he is discovered, the males will enter into combat wherein they lean backward, both clasped to the female's abdomen, and freely suspended, engage in rapid, sweeping blows with their forelegs in a manner similar to boxing. Usually, when the intruder gains attachment to the female's abdomen, these conflicts result in the displacement of the original mate.

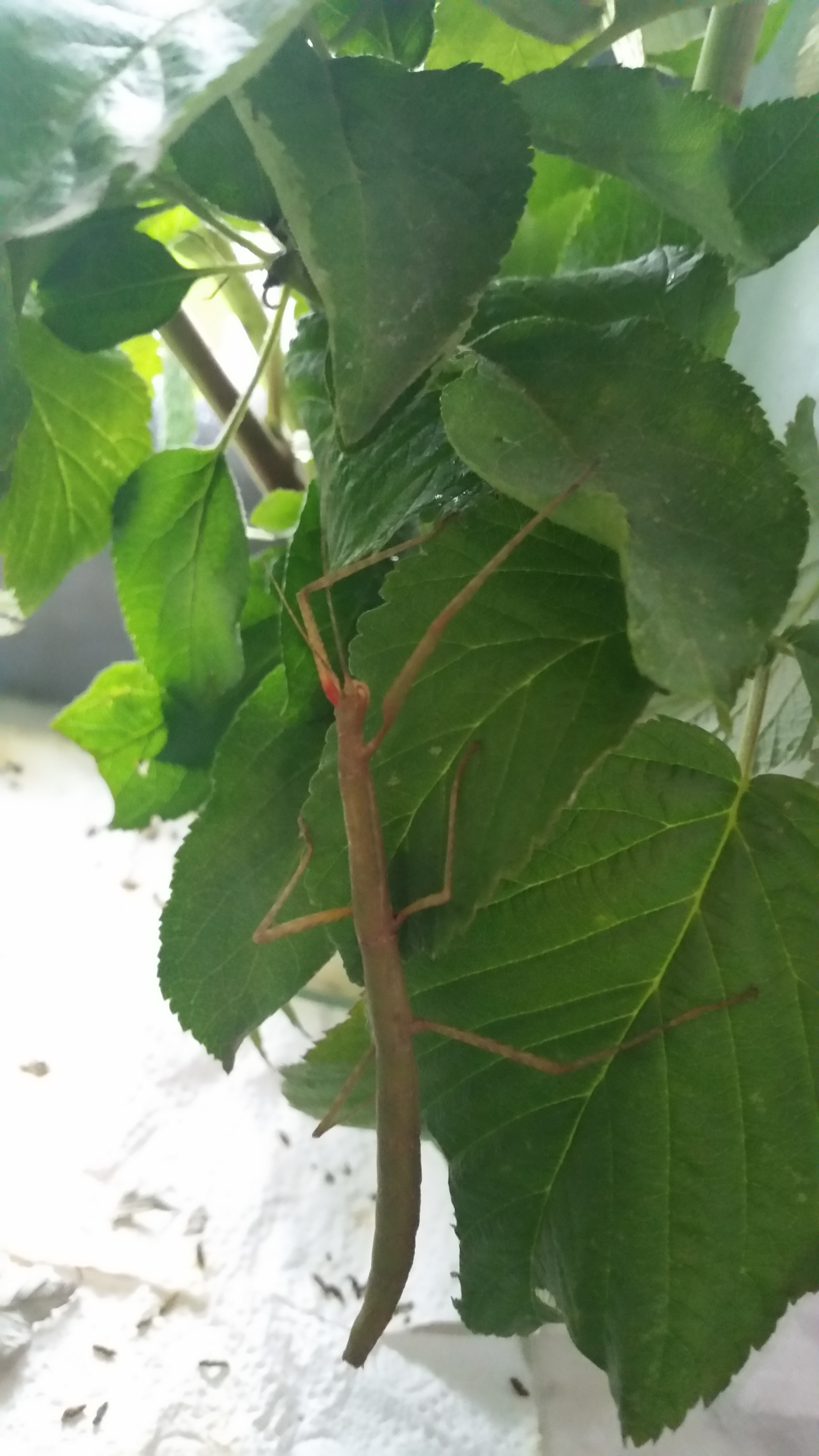
Carausius morosus is often kept as a pet by schools and individuals.

Lengthy pairings have also been described in terms of a defensive alliance. When cleaved together, the pair is more unwieldy for predators to handle. Also, the chemical defenses (secretions, reflex bleeding, regurgitation) of the individual stick insect are enhanced when two are paired. Females survive attacks by predators significantly better when pairing, largely because the dorsal position of the male functions well as a shield. This could indicate that manipulation by females is taking place: if females accept ejaculate at a slow rate, for instance, the males are forced to remain in copulo for longer and the female's chances of survival are enhanced. Also, evolution could have simply favored males that remained attached to their females longer, since females are often less abundant than males and represent a valuable prize, so for the lucky male, even the sacrifice of his own life to preserve his offspring with the female may be worthwhile. Sexual dimorphism in the species, where females are usually significantly larger than the males, may have evolved due to the fitness advantage accrued to males that can remain attached to the female, thereby blocking competitors, without severely impeding her movement.

Certain Phasmatodea, such as Anisomorpha buprestoides, sometimes form aggregations. These insects have been observed to congregate during the day in a concealed location, going their separate ways at nightfall to forage, and returning to their refuge before dawn. Such behavior has been little studied, and how the insects find their way back is unknown.

== In human culture ==
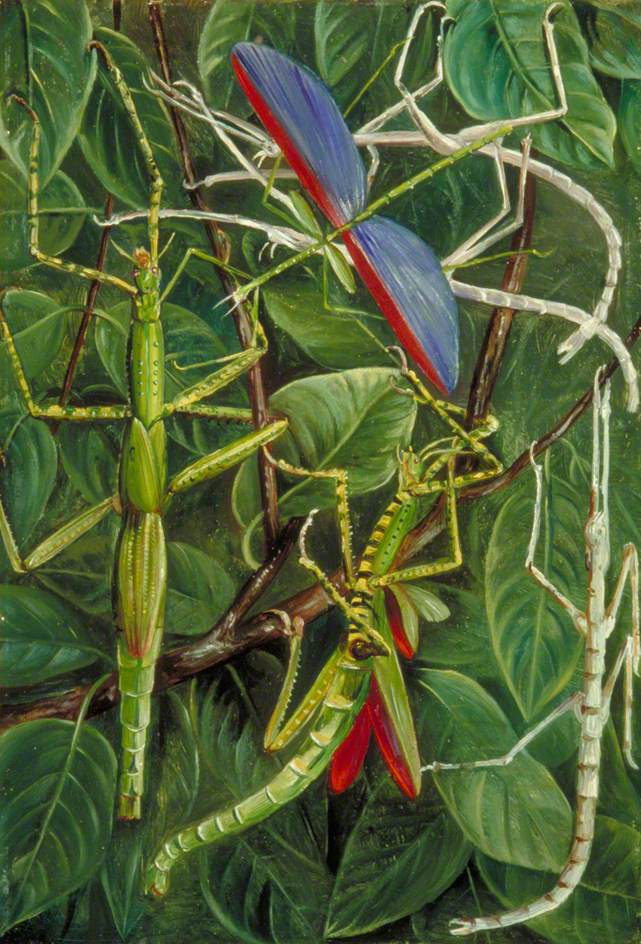
Painting of Stick Insects by Marianne North, 1870s

Stick insects are often kept in captivity: almost 300 species have been reared in laboratories or as pets. The most commonly kept is the Indian (or laboratory) stick insect, Carausius morosus, which eats vegetables such as lettuce. Droppings of the stick insect Eurycnema versirubra (Serville, 1838) [=Eurycnema versifasciata] fed with specific plants are made into a medicinal tea by Malaysian Chinese to treat ailments.

The botanical illustrator Marianne North (1830–1890) painted leaf and stick insects that she saw on her travels in the 1870s.

Tribesmen in Sarawak eat phasmids and their eggs.

Some indigenous people of the D'Entrecasteaux Islands have traditionally made fishhooks from the legs of certain phasmids.

Research has been conducted to analyze the stick insect method of walking and apply this to the engineering of six-legged walking robots. Instead of one centralized control system, it seems each leg of a phasmid operates independently.

In Australia and Hawaii many kinds of stick insects are kept as exotic pets including the strong, goliath, spiny and children's. The custom of keeping stick insects as pets was probably brought to Australia by either Chinese, Japanese or Vietnamese immigrants during World War II, the Korean War or the Vietnam War.

Stick insects have been kept as pets since the time of the Han dynasty. They were kept inside birdcages and people in the Far East believe they bring good luck and fortune, just like crickets.

The video game Disco Elysium includes a storyline centered around a giant stick insect and cryptid called the Insulindian phasmid.

A clip of a stick insect swaying back and forth, in a manner akin to dancing, became an Internet meme in 2020 as a bait-and-switch.
