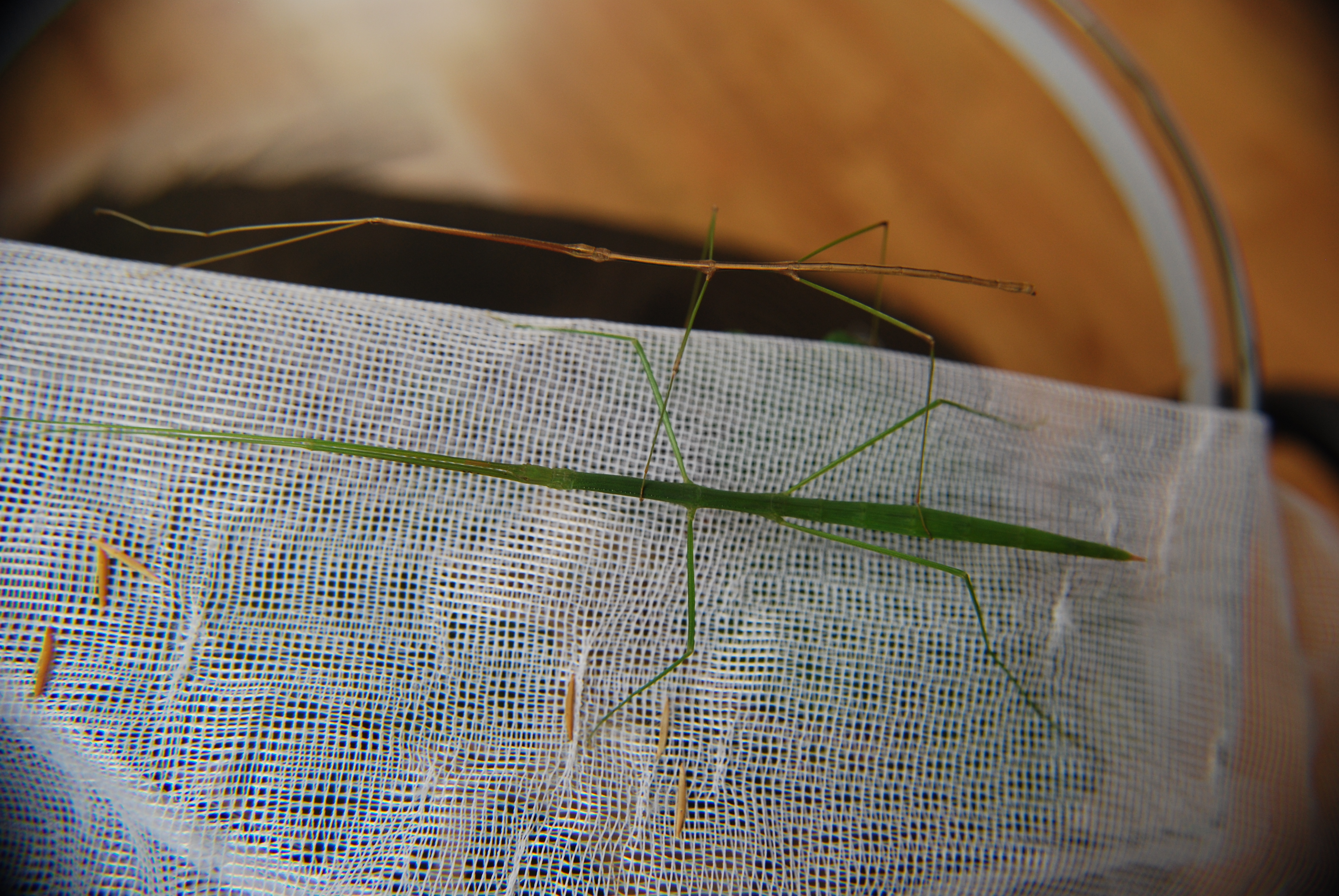
- Clonaria conformans male & female

Scientific classification
- Kingdom: Animalia
- Phylum: Arthropoda
- Clade: Pancrustacea
- Class: Insecta
- Order: Phasmatodea
- Family: Bacillidae
- Tribe: Gratidiini
- Genus: Clonaria; Stål, 1875

= Clonaria =

Genus of insects

Clonaria is an Asian genus of stick insects belonging to the tribe Gratidiini.

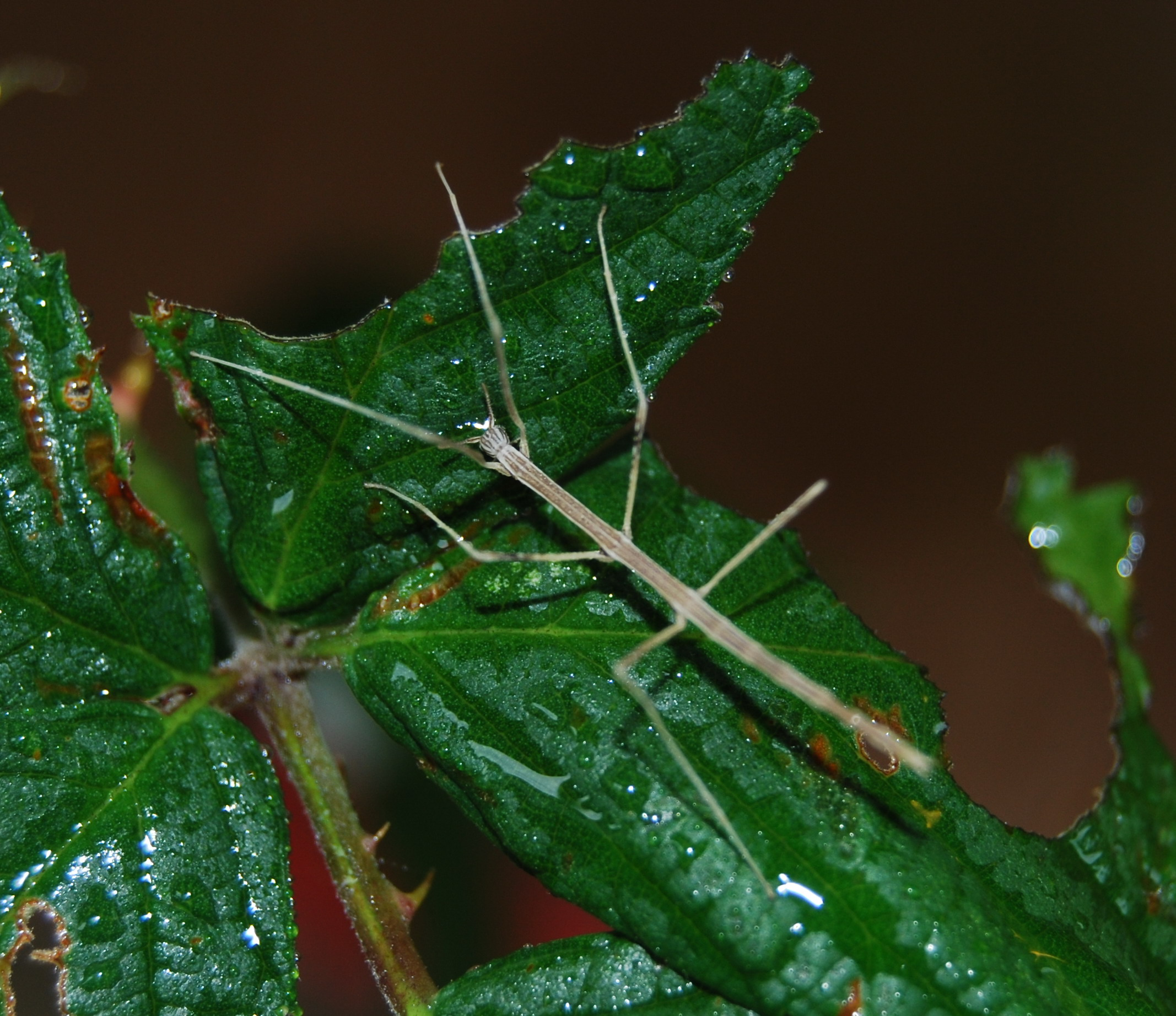
Clonaria conformans nymph

== Species ==
The Catalogue of Life lists:

- Clonaria abdul (Westwood, 1859)
- Clonaria adelungi (Brunner von Wattenwyl, 1907)
- Clonaria aegyptiaca (Gray, 1835)
- Clonaria aestuans (Saussure, 1862)
- Clonaria affinis (Schulthess, 1898)
- Clonaria agrostimorpha (Rehn, 1914)
- Clonaria albida (Sjöstedt, 1909)
- Clonaria angolensis (Rehn, 1912)
- Clonaria annulata (Westwood, 1859)
- Clonaria aphrodite (Rehn, 1914)
- Clonaria arcuata (Karsch, 1898)
- Clonaria arida (Karsch, 1898)
- Clonaria asystasia (Thanasinchayakul, 2006)
- Clonaria beroe (Westwood, 1859)
- Clonaria beybienkoi (Bekuzin, 1960)
- Clonaria bifurcata (Karsch, 1898)
- Clonaria bispinosa (Chopard, 1938)
- Clonaria breviuscula (Bolívar, 1922)
- Clonaria brunneri Kirby, 1904
- Clonaria buchholzi (Gerstaecker, 1883)
- Clonaria bugoiensis (Rehn, 1914)
- Clonaria canaliculata (Sjöstedt, 1924)
- Clonaria capelongata Brock, 2005
- Clonaria capemontana Brock, 2007
- Clonaria cederbergensis Brock, 2006
- Clonaria conformans (Brunner von Wattenwyl, 1907)
- Clonaria congoensis (Sjöstedt, 1909)
- Clonaria cristata (Brunner von Wattenwyl, 1907)
- Clonaria cryptocercata (Rehn, 1912)
- Clonaria cylindrica (Sjöstedt, 1909)
- Clonaria damicornis (Bolívar, 1922)
- Clonaria deschauenseei Rehn, 1933
- Clonaria dicranura (Uvarov, 1939)
- Clonaria digitalis (Sjöstedt, 1924)
- Clonaria eitami (Brock & Shlagman, 1994)
- Clonaria elgonensis (Sjöstedt, 1934)
- Clonaria ensis (Bolívar, 1922)
- Clonaria evanescens (Karsch, 1898)
- Clonaria excisa (Sjöstedt, 1909)
- Clonaria fissa (Karsch, 1898)
- Clonaria flavescens (Sjöstedt, 1909)
- Clonaria forcipata (Karsch, 1898)
- Clonaria fritzschei (Zompro, 2000)
- Clonaria furcata (Brunner von Wattenwyl, 1907)
- Clonaria furcifer (Sjöstedt, 1909)
- Clonaria gigliotosi Otte & Brock, 2005
- Clonaria globosa (Brunner von Wattenwyl, 1907)
- Clonaria gracilipes (Westwood, 1859)
- Clonaria gracilis (Chopard, 1938)
- Clonaria graminis (Sjöstedt, 1909)
- Clonaria guenzii (Bates, 1865)
- Clonaria guilielmi (Sjöstedt, 1924)
- Clonaria hamuligera (Schulthess, 1898)
- Clonaria incisa (Chopard, 1938)
- Clonaria inclinata (Karsch, 1898)
- Clonaria inconspicua (Brunner von Wattenwyl, 1907)
- Clonaria indica (Gray, 1835)
- Clonaria insolita (Brunner von Wattenwyl, 1907)
- Clonaria insulsa (Brunner von Wattenwyl, 1907)
- Clonaria javanica (Haan, 1842)
- Clonaria jeanneli (Chopard, 1938)
- Clonaria kibonotensis (Sjöstedt, 1909)
- Clonaria kivuensis (Rehn, 1914)
- Clonaria kurda (Uvarov, 1944)
- Clonaria laminifera (Chopard, 1938)
- Clonaria leprosa (Gerstaecker, 1869)
- Clonaria libanica (Uvarov, 1924)
- Clonaria lindneri (Kevan, 1955)
- Clonaria lineaalba (Rehn, 1914)
- Clonaria lineata (Gray, 1835)
- Clonaria lineolata (Brunner von Wattenwyl, 1907)
- Clonaria longefurcata (Chopard, 1954)
- Clonaria longithorax (Brunner von Wattenwyl, 1907)
- Clonaria luethyi (Zompro, 2000)
- Clonaria manderensis (Chopard, 1954)
- Clonaria massaica (Sjöstedt, 1909)
- Clonaria massauensis (Giglio-Tos, 1910)
- Clonaria minuta (Giglio-Tos, 1910)
- Clonaria montana (Brunner von Wattenwyl, 1907)
- Clonaria montivaga (Sjöstedt, 1909)
- Clonaria nairobensis (Bolívar, 1919)
- Clonaria naivashensis (Bolívar, 1922)
- Clonaria nana (Mishchenko, 1941)
- Clonaria natalis (Westwood, 1859) - type species (as Bacillus natalis Westwood)
- Clonaria nebulosipes (Rehn, 1911)
- Clonaria nimbana (Chopard, 1955)
- Clonaria nubilipes (Sjöstedt, 1924)
- Clonaria obocensis (Brunner von Wattenwyl, 1907)
- Clonaria parva (Zompro, 1998)
- Clonaria pedunculata (Rehn, 1914)
- Clonaria planicercata (Rehn, 1914)
- Clonaria polita (Sjöstedt, 1909)
- Clonaria postrostrata (Karsch, 1898)
- Clonaria postspinosa (Sjöstedt, 1909)
- Clonaria predtetshenskyi (Bey-Bienko, 1946)
- Clonaria proboscidea (Bolívar, 1922)
- Clonaria prodigiosa (Karsch, 1898)
- Clonaria prolata (Karsch, 1898)
- Clonaria propinqua (Giglio-Tos, 1910)
- Clonaria pulchrepicta (Carl, 1913)
- Clonaria pulchripes (Rehn, 1912)
- Clonaria quinquecarinata (Chopard, 1938)
- Clonaria rectangulata (Bolívar, 1922)
- Clonaria reducta (Brunner von Wattenwyl, 1907)
- Clonaria rehni (Bolívar, 1922)
- Clonaria rubrotaeniatus (Günther, 1956)
- Clonaria ruwenzorica (Rehn, 1914)
- Clonaria sansibara (Stål, 1875)
- Clonaria schaumi (Karsch, 1898)
- Clonaria schizura (Uvarov, 1939)
- Clonaria securigera (Brunner von Wattenwyl, 1907)
- Clonaria sicca (Sjöstedt, 1909)
- Clonaria silvaepluvialis (Sjöstedt, 1909)
- Clonaria simplex (Brunner von Wattenwyl, 1907)
- Clonaria sjoestedti (Rehn, 1914)
- Clonaria sororcula (Rehn, 1914)
- Clonaria specifica (Brunner von Wattenwyl, 1907)
- Clonaria spinulosa (Brunner von Wattenwyl, 1907)
- Clonaria subquadrata (Sjöstedt, 1924)
- Clonaria talea (Karsch, 1898)
- Clonaria tardigrada (Sjöstedt, 1934)
- Clonaria tenuis (Sjöstedt, 1909)
- Clonaria trivittata (Gerstaecker, 1883)
- Clonaria uvaroviana (Mishchenko, 1937)
- Clonaria viridis (Gray, 1835)
- Clonaria voluptaria (Brunner von Wattenwyl, 1907)
- Clonaria werneri (Ebner, 1934)
- Clonaria xiphidophora (Rehn, 1914)
