= Macellina =

Scientific classification
- Domain: Eukaryota
- Kingdom: Animalia
- Phylum: Arthropoda
- Class: Insecta
- Order: Phasmatodea
- Superfamily: Bacilloidea
- Family: Bacillidae
- Tribe: Gratidiini
- Genus: Macellina; Uvarov, 1940

Synonyms
- Macella Stål, 1875

Genus of stick insects

External image
- Images at iNaturalist

Macellina is a genus of stick insects in the tribe Gratidiini, erected by Boris Uvarov in 1940. Species have been recorded from China, Thailand and Vietnam (possibly incomplete distribution).

== Species ==
The Phasmida Species File lists:

1. Macellina caulodes (Rehn, 1904)
2. Macellina dentata (Stål, 1875)
3. Macellina digitata Chen & Wang, 1993
4. Macellina nigriseta Ho, 2013
5. Macellina qizhouense Ho, 2015
6. Macellina souchongia (Westwood, 1859) - type species (as Bacillus souchongia Westwood)
