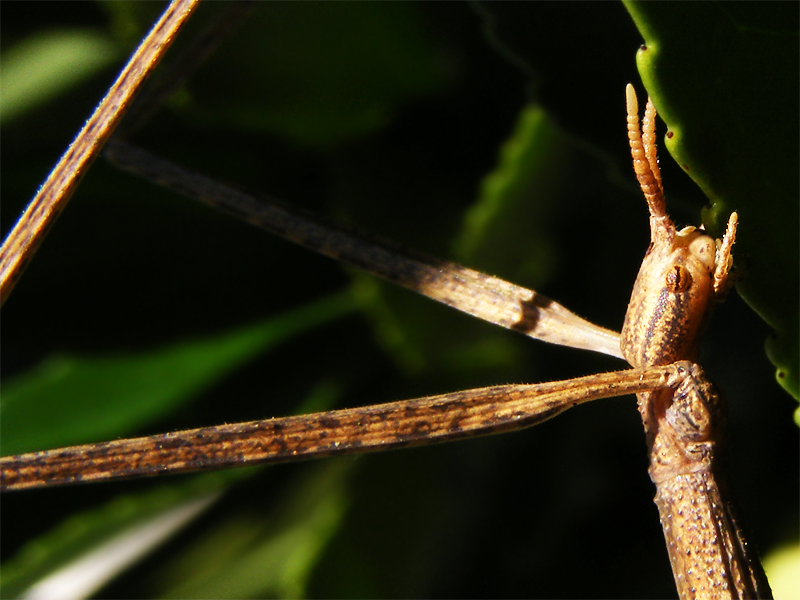
- Female Leptynia attenuata in Buarcos (Vale de Leão), Coimbra, Portugal

Scientific classification
- Domain: Eukaryota
- Kingdom: Animalia
- Phylum: Arthropoda
- Class: Insecta
- Order: Phasmatodea
- Family: Bacillidae
- Genus: Leptynia
- Species: L. attenuata

Binomial name
- Leptynia attenuata Pantel, 1890

= Leptynia attenuata =

Species of stick insect

Leptynia attenuata is a species of stick insect from Diapheromeridae family which is endemic to Portugal.

== Study ==
In 1998 the species was studied by Anna Paola Bianchi and Patrizia Meliado who discovered that the species have 36 chromosomes and is reproduced by amphigony.
