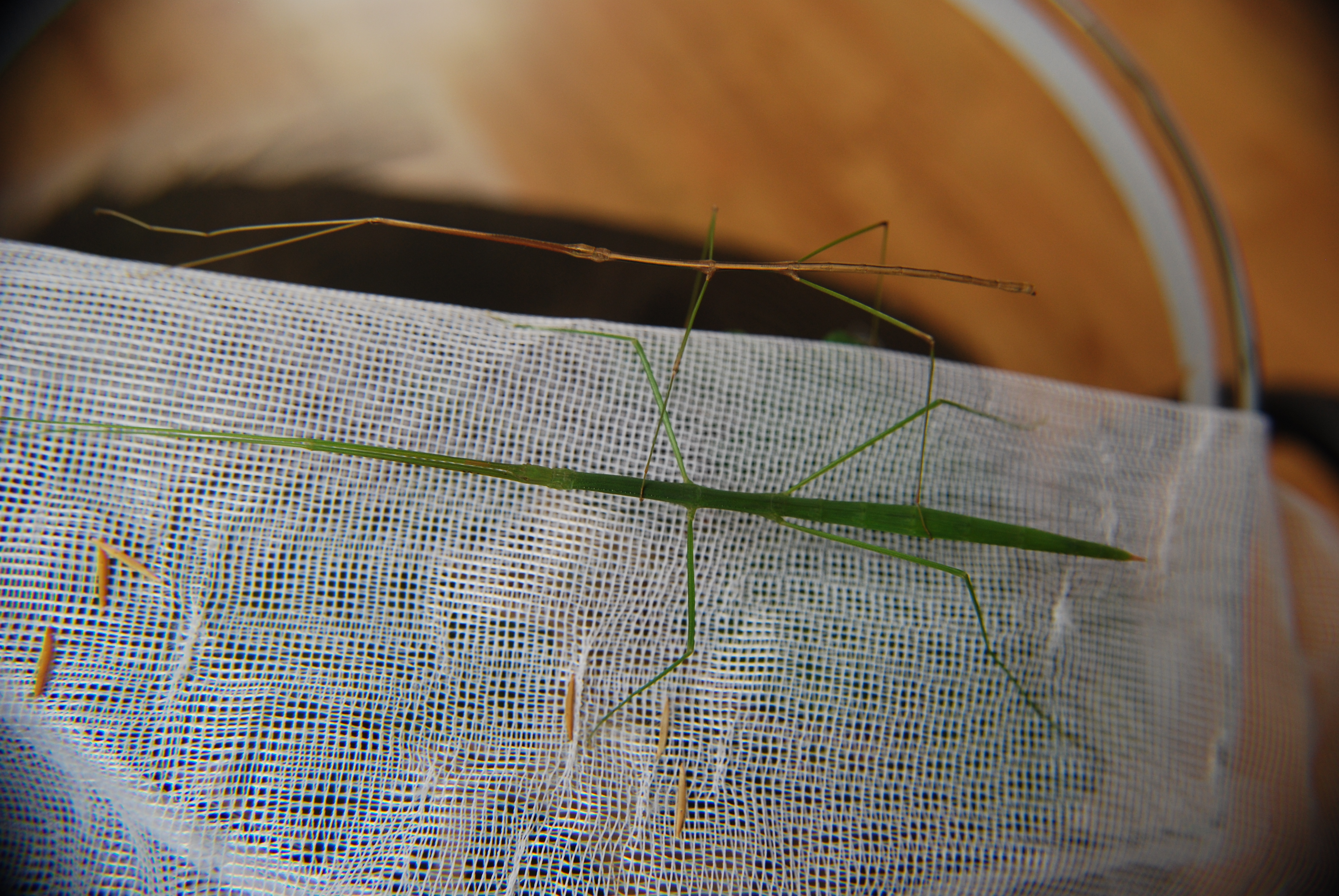
- Clonaria conformans: female, male and eggs

Scientific classification
- Domain: Eukaryota
- Kingdom: Animalia
- Phylum: Arthropoda
- Class: Insecta
- Order: Phasmatodea
- Superfamily: Bacilloidea
- Family: Bacillidae
- Tribe: Gratidiini; Cliquennois, 2005

= Gratidiini =

Tribe of stick insects

The Gratidiini are a tribe of stick insects based on the type genus Clonaria (as an old synonym Gratidia Stål, 1875) and first used by Cliquennois in 2005. Genera are known to be distributed in: Africa, Europe, temperate and tropical Asia and various Pacific Islands.

This tribe was previously placed in the Pachymorphinae, but the current consensus (2022) is that it is better placed in the Bacilloidea: either in the family Bacillidae or a proposed new family "Gratidiidae".

== Genera ==
The Phasmida Species File lists:

1. Adelungella Brunner von Wattenwyl, 1907
2. Adelungella Brunner von Wattenwyl, 1907
3. Burria Brunner von Wattenwyl, 1900
4. Clonaria Stål, 1875
5. Gharianus Werner, 1908
6. Gratidiinilobus Brock, 2005
7. Ladakhomorpha Hennemann & Conle, 1999
8. Leptynia Pantel, 1890
9. Linocerus Gray, 1835
10. Macellina Uvarov, 1940
11. Maransis Karsch, 1898
12. Paragongylopus Chen & He, 1997
13. Phthoa Karsch, 1898
14. Pijnackeria Scali, 2009
15. Sceptrophasma Brock & Seow-Choen, 2000
16. Zangphasma Chen & He, 2008
17. Zehntneria Brunner von Wattenwyl, 1907
