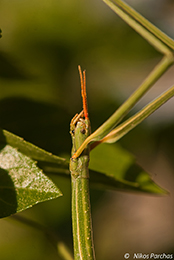
- Bacillus atticus atticus

Scientific classification
- Kingdom: Animalia
- Phylum: Arthropoda
- Class: Insecta
- Order: Phasmatodea
- Family: Bacillidae
- Genus: Bacillus
- Species: B. atticus
- Subspecies: B. a. atticus

Trinomial name
- Bacillus atticus atticus Brunner v. W., 1882

= Bacillus atticus atticus =

Subspecies of insect

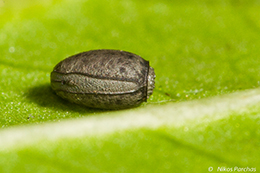
The glyphs on the eggs, are very distinguishable

Bacillus atticus atticus is a species of phasmid or "walking stick" with recorded specimens in Greece, Italy, Croatia and Israel. In Cyprus, the endemic subspecies Bacillus atticus cyprius is present. Both can often be found climbing on plants.

== Description ==
Adults have a slim body about 80 mm long, with a stripe on each side. Their antennae are red and short. The forelegs are strong, around 50 mm long, painted red at their base.

== Behaviour ==
Bacillus atticus atticus is mostly active at night, when it feeds. The usual foods of this species are plants such as ivy and lettuce. During the day, the animal stays absolutely still, camouflaged as a stick, matching the color of the plant that it's on. If disturbed, its main defense is to feign death. Like many phasmids, the species is parthenogenetic, so it can reproduce on its own by laying eggs. The eggs are ovoid-shaped, with some distinguishable glyphics around them and a sponge-like shape on the top.

== See also ==
- Bacillus rossius, the endemic Bacillus of Western Mediterranean Europe
