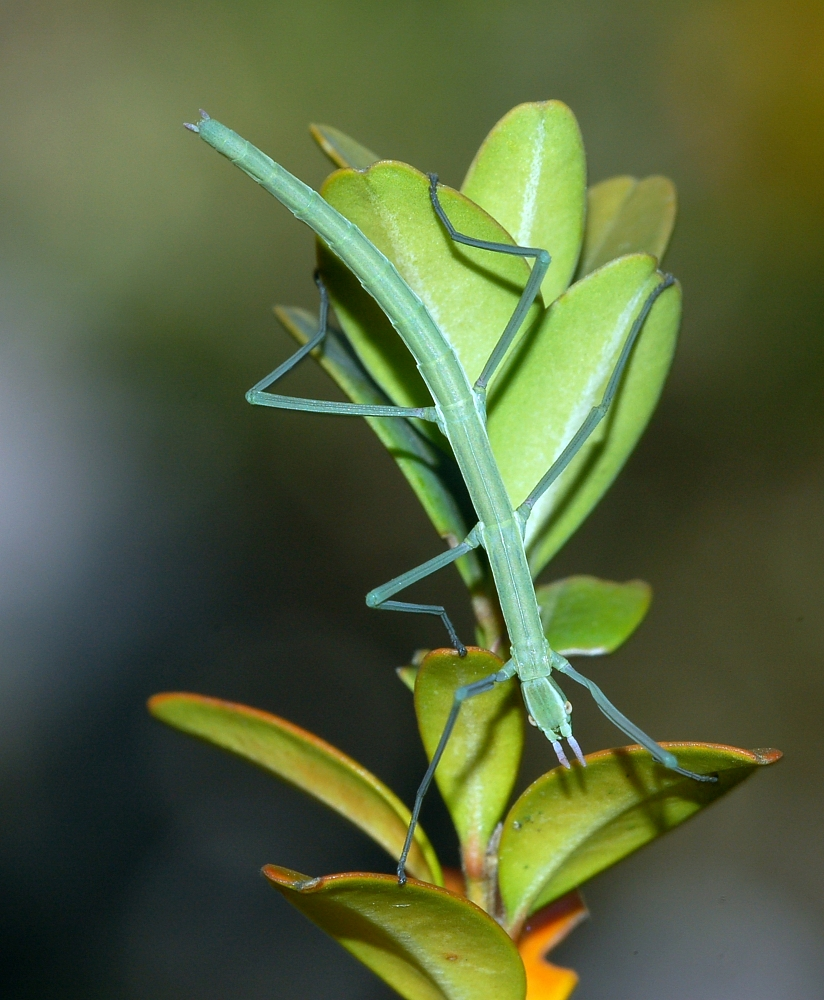

Scientific classification
- Kingdom: Animalia
- Phylum: Arthropoda
- Clade: Pancrustacea
- Class: Insecta
- Order: Phasmatodea
- Family: Bacillidae
- Genus: Pijnackeria
- Species: P. hispanica

Binomial name
- Pijnackeria hispanica (Bolívar, 1878)

Synonyms
- Bacillus hispanicus Bolívar, 1878; Leptinia hispanica (Bolívar, 1878); Leptynia hispanica (Bolívar, 1878); Parabacillus hispanica (Bolívar, 1878); Phthoa hispanicus (Bolívar, 1878)

= Pijnackeria hispanica =

Species of stick insect

Pijnackeria hispanica, commonly known as the Spanish walkingstick or the Spanish stick insect, is a species of Phasmid (stick insect) in the family Diapheromeridae. It is found in Spain and France. This species' color can be turquoise, brown, or green. P. hispanica usually feeds on rose leaves. This phasmid is slender with short antennae and yellow or brown eyes with a black horizontal stripe or pseudopupil.
