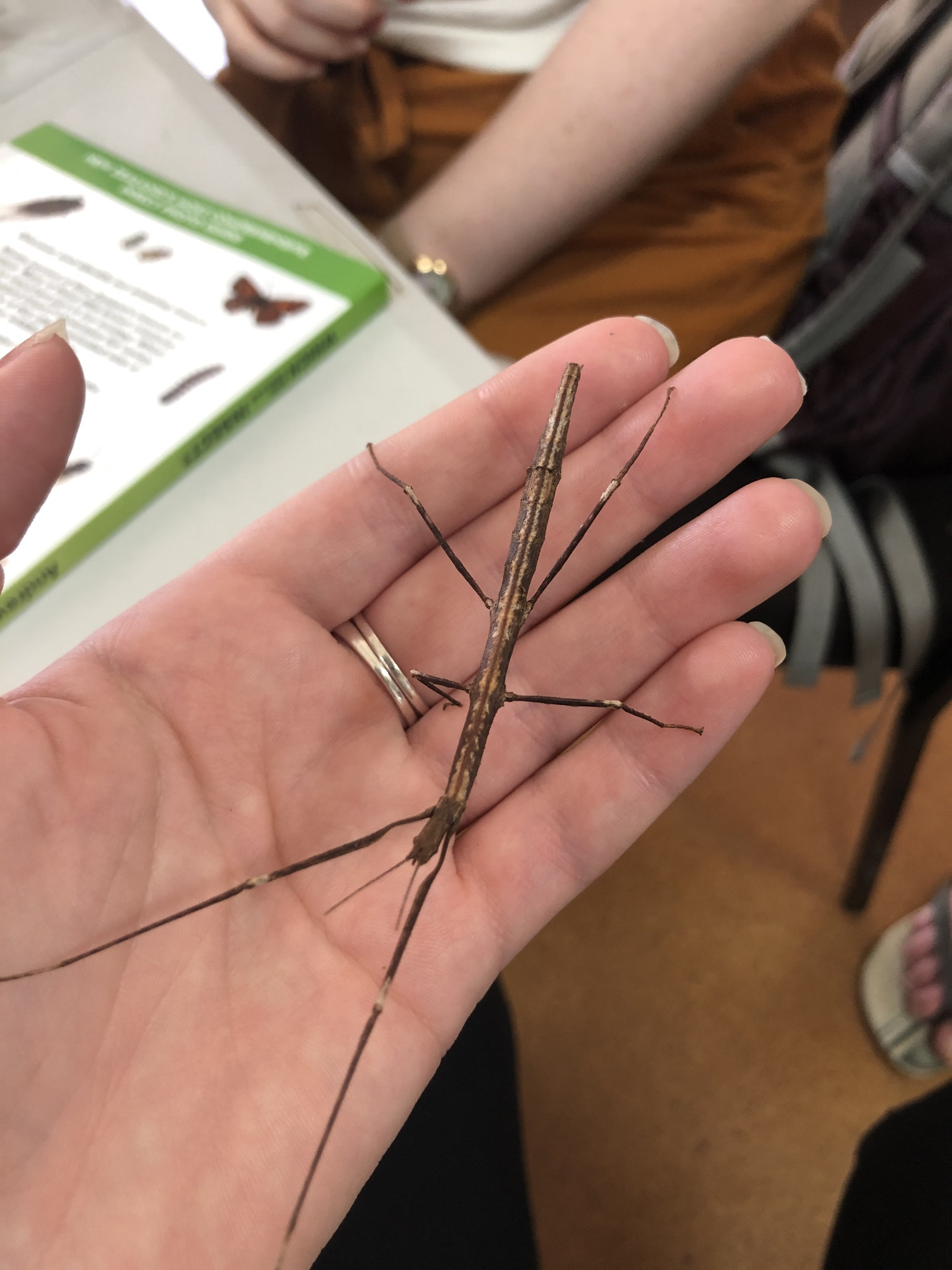

Scientific classification
- Kingdom: Animalia
- Phylum: Arthropoda
- Clade: Pancrustacea
- Class: Insecta
- Order: Phasmatodea
- Family: Phasmatidae
- Tribe: Pachymorphini
- Genus: Asteliaphasma; Jewell & Brock, 2003
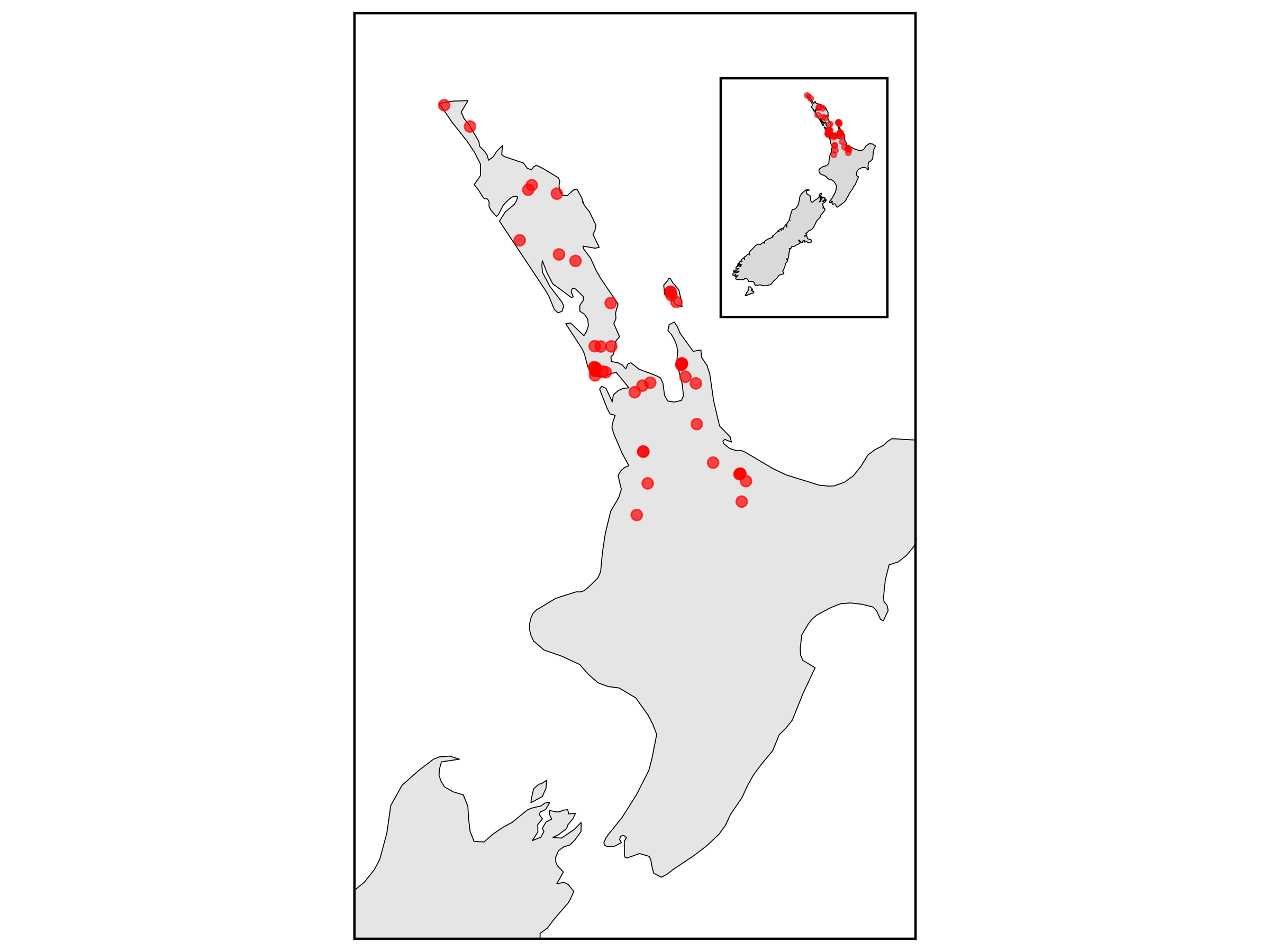
- Asteliaphasma distribution

= Asteliaphasma =

Genus of insects

Asteliaphasma is a genus of stick insects (order Phasmatodea) belonging to the family Phasmatidae. The genus is endemic to New Zealand and the species were first described by Salmon in 1991 and later moved to the genus Asteliaphasma. Members of this genus are found in the forests of the North Island, where they have been collected at elevations up to 900 meters above sea level. Asteliaphasma are nocturnal, apterous (wingless), arboreal stick insects that feeds on Astelia and rātā species.

Species:

- Asteliaphasma jucundus (Salmon, 1991)
- Asteliaphasma naomi (Salmon, 1991)

As of 2014, both species are considered not threatened by the New Zealand Department of Conservation (DOC).

== Taxonomy and phylogeny ==
The genus is named from the plant genus Astelia (family Liliaceae), combined with the suffix "phasma" meaning "phantom" or "insect" (reference to stick insects). The species is so far only known from Astelia species and the Astelia-like Freycinetia banksii (Pandanaceae) and climbing rātā.

One species, Asteliaphasma naomi, for a long time was known from a single specimen, but has now been collected a number of times.

Early classifications suggested that Asteliaphasma was a sister group to Spinotectarchus; however, recent molecular data indicate that they are not sister taxa. Instead, phylogenetic analysis indicates that A. jucundus is more closely related to Niveaphasma and Micrarchus species.

== Morphology ==
Asteliaphasma are small, slender and completely wingless stick insects. Until 2005 only female A. jocunda had been recorded so reproduction of some populations might be parthenogenetic, a pattern consistent with that observed in other New Zealand stick insects. Adult female A. jucundus range from 64 to 88 mm in body length and males are thinner and shorter (5mm).

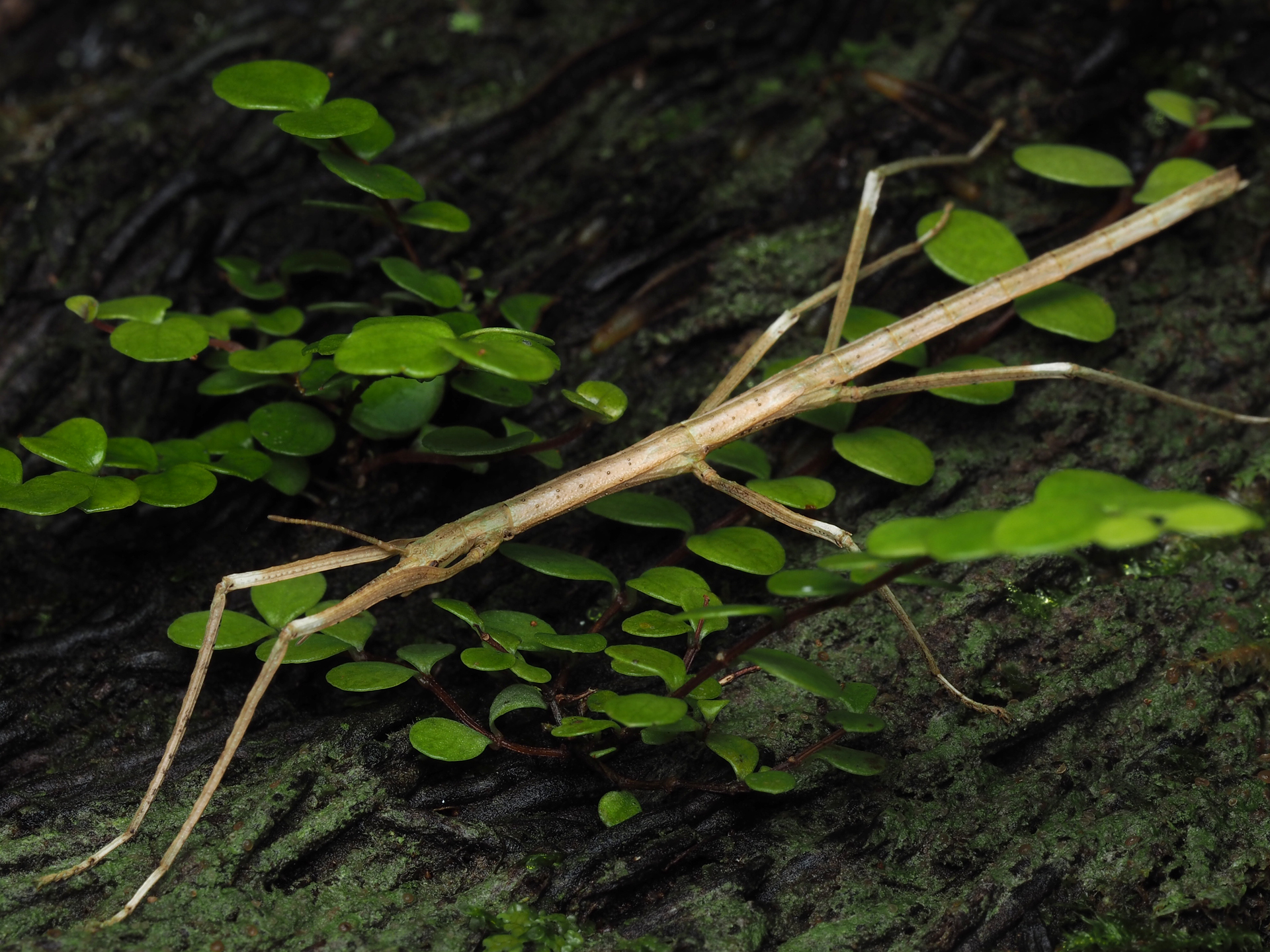
Female Asteliaphasma jucundum

The following key features are used to identify this genus:

- Entire body lightly granulated, sometimes with small tubercles
- A pair of short spines between the eyes
- Antennae slightly shorter than the fore femora (the femur of the foreleg)
- Small lateral lobes may be present on the fifth abdominal segment
- Operculum boat-shaped, reaching the tip of the anal segment

Asteliaphasma eggs are elongated, cylindrical, finely pitted and lightly rugose with minute spine-like setae restricted to the anterior and dorsal regions.
