= Sceptrophasma humilis =

Scientific classification
- Kingdom: Animalia
- Phylum: Arthropoda
- Class: Insecta
- Order: Phasmatodea
- Family: Bacillidae
- Genus: Sceptrophasma
- Species: S. humilis

Binomial name
- Sceptrophasma humilis (Westwood, 1859)

Synonyms
- Bacillus carinulatus Saussure, 1868; Bacillus humilis Westwood, 1859; Gratidia carinulata (Saussure, 1868); Ramulus carinulatus (Saussure, 1868); Ramulus humilis (Westwood, 1859)

Species of stick insect

Sceptrophasma humilis is a species of phasmid or stick insect of the genus Sceptrophasma. It is found in Sri Lanka.
