= Leptynia caprai =

Scientific classification
- Domain: Eukaryota
- Kingdom: Animalia
- Phylum: Arthropoda
- Class: Insecta
- Order: Phasmatodea
- Family: Bacillidae
- Genus: Leptynia
- Species: L. caprai

Binomial name
- Leptynia caprai Scali, 1996

Species of stick insect

Leptynia caprai is a species of stick insect which is endemic to Spain. In 1998 the species was studied by Anna Paola Bianchi and Patrizia Meliado who discovered that the species have 40 chromosomes.
