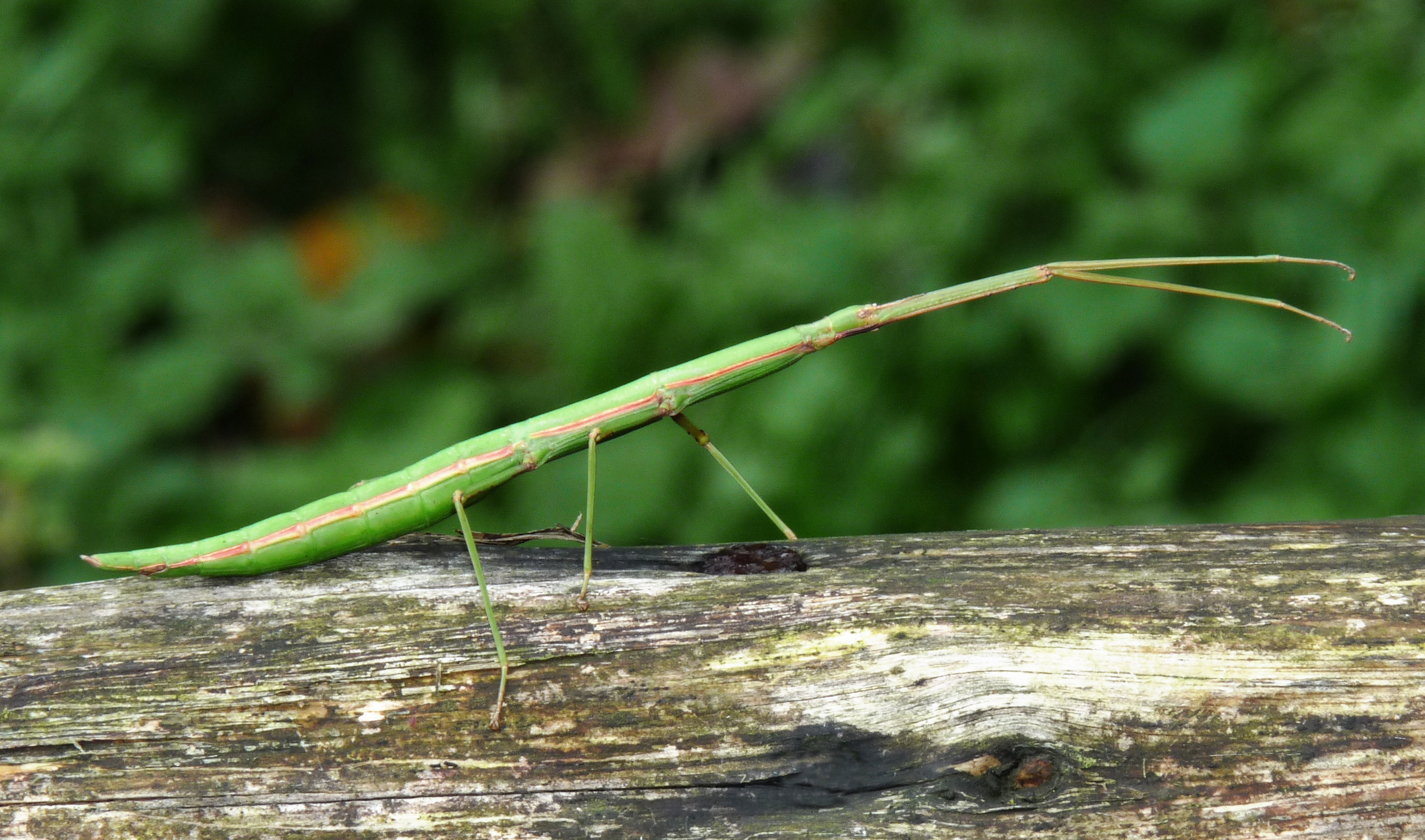

Scientific classification
- Kingdom: Animalia
- Phylum: Arthropoda
- Clade: Pancrustacea
- Class: Insecta
- Order: Phasmatodea
- Family: Bacillidae
- Genus: Bacillus
- Species: B. rossius

Binomial name
- Bacillus rossius (Rossi, 1790)

Subspecies
- Bacillus rossius subsp. catalauniae L.Bullini, 1982; Bacillus rossius subsp. lobipes Lucas, 1849; Bacillus rossius subsp. medeae Nascetti & L.Bullini, 1983; Bacillus rossius subsp. montalentii L.Bullini, 1982; Bacillus rossius subsp. redtenbacheri Padewieth, 1899; Bacillus rossius subsp. rossius; Bacillus rossius subsp. tripolitanus (Haan & W.de, 1842)

Synonyms
- Mantis rossia Rossi, 1790; Pseudomantis rossius Rossius, 1790

= Bacillus rossius =

Species of stick insect

The European stick insect (Bacillus rossius) also called the European stick bug, European walking stick, or Mediterranean stick insect, is a species of stick insect, common in southern Europe. The species is endemic to the northwestern Mediterranean, especially Italy, Spain, Southern France, and the Balkans.

== Overview ==
Adults have a slim body, with short antennae and long, thin legs. Colors vary from brown to green, sometimes with a pinkish tinge on its head, legs and sides. This species can eat bramble leaves, ivy, and privet. B. rossius can be found from June to mid December and the eggs look like seeds. Females are larger than the male, with a bigger abdomen. An adult can be 10 cm (4 inches) in length.

== Life cycle ==
The nymphs hatch out from their seed-like eggs 8 weeks to 2 months after being laid by a female. Like the adult, the nymphs sway as in a breeze to avoid predators. B. rossius lives up to a year. They are nocturnal and may stay still for hours and usually feed at night. They shed the exoskeleton a few times in their life.

== Predators ==
The predators include birds, frogs, lizards, rodents and spiders.

== Gallery ==
Many young stick insects on leaves (video)

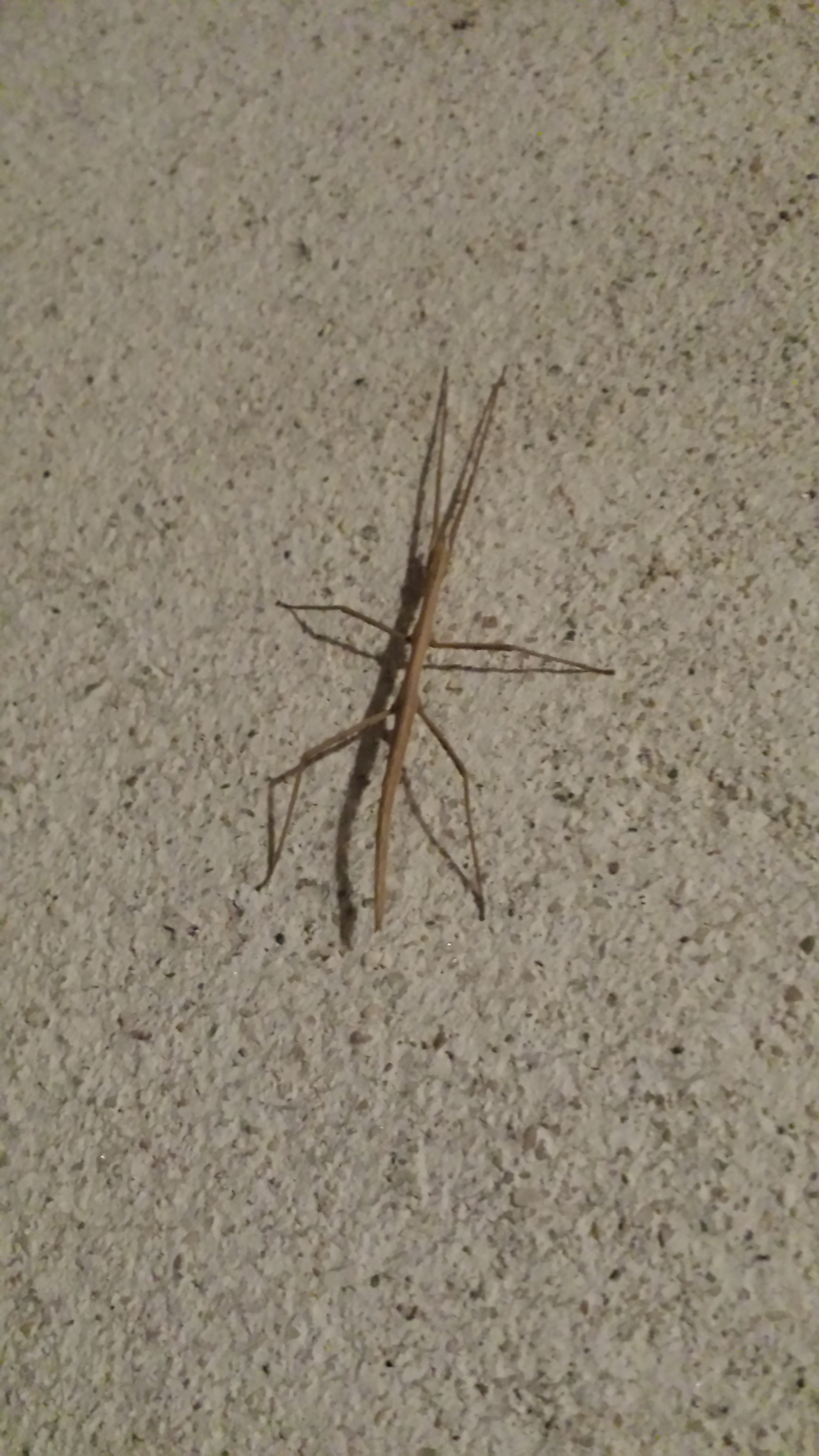
A brown form

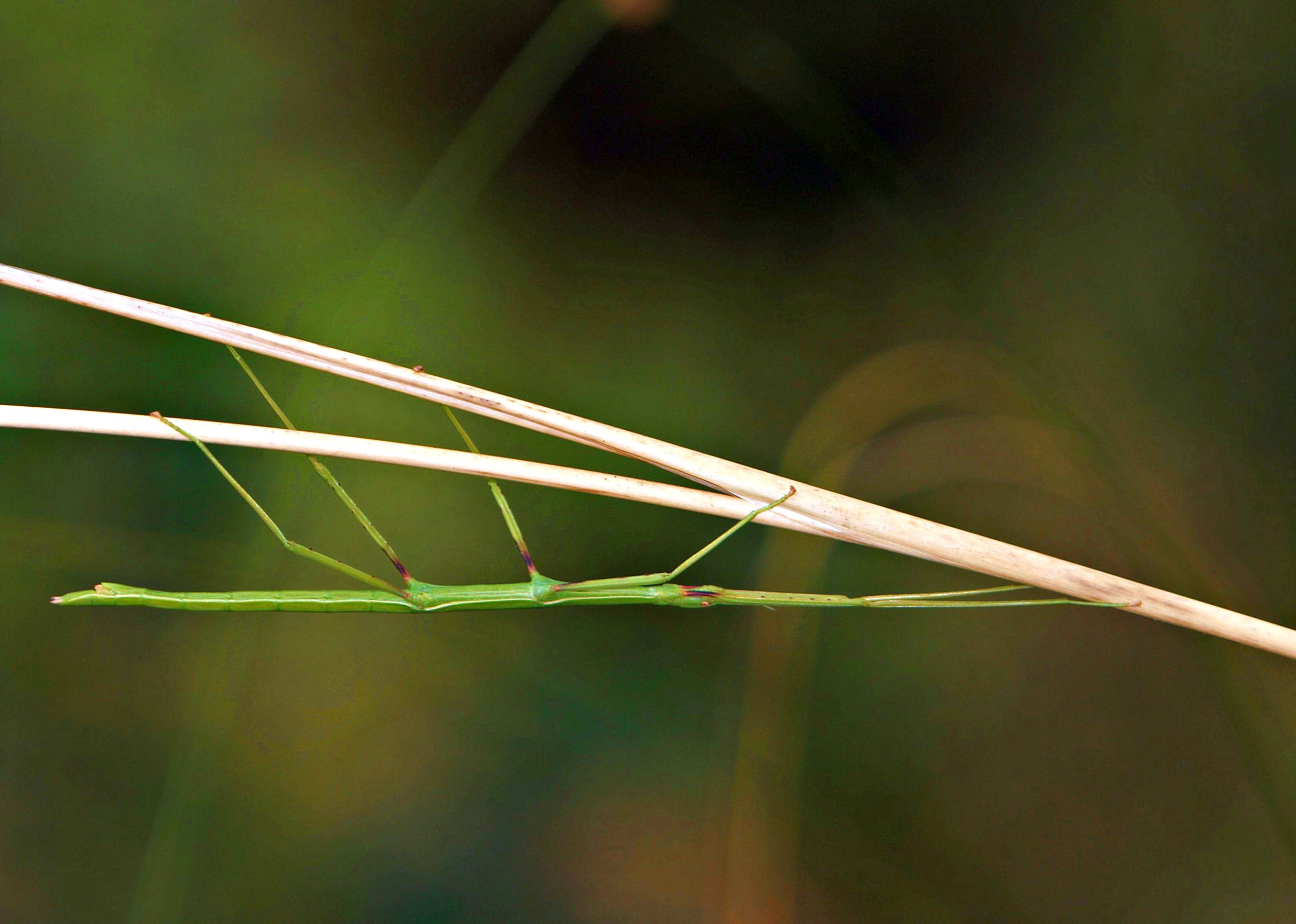
B. rossius on a twig

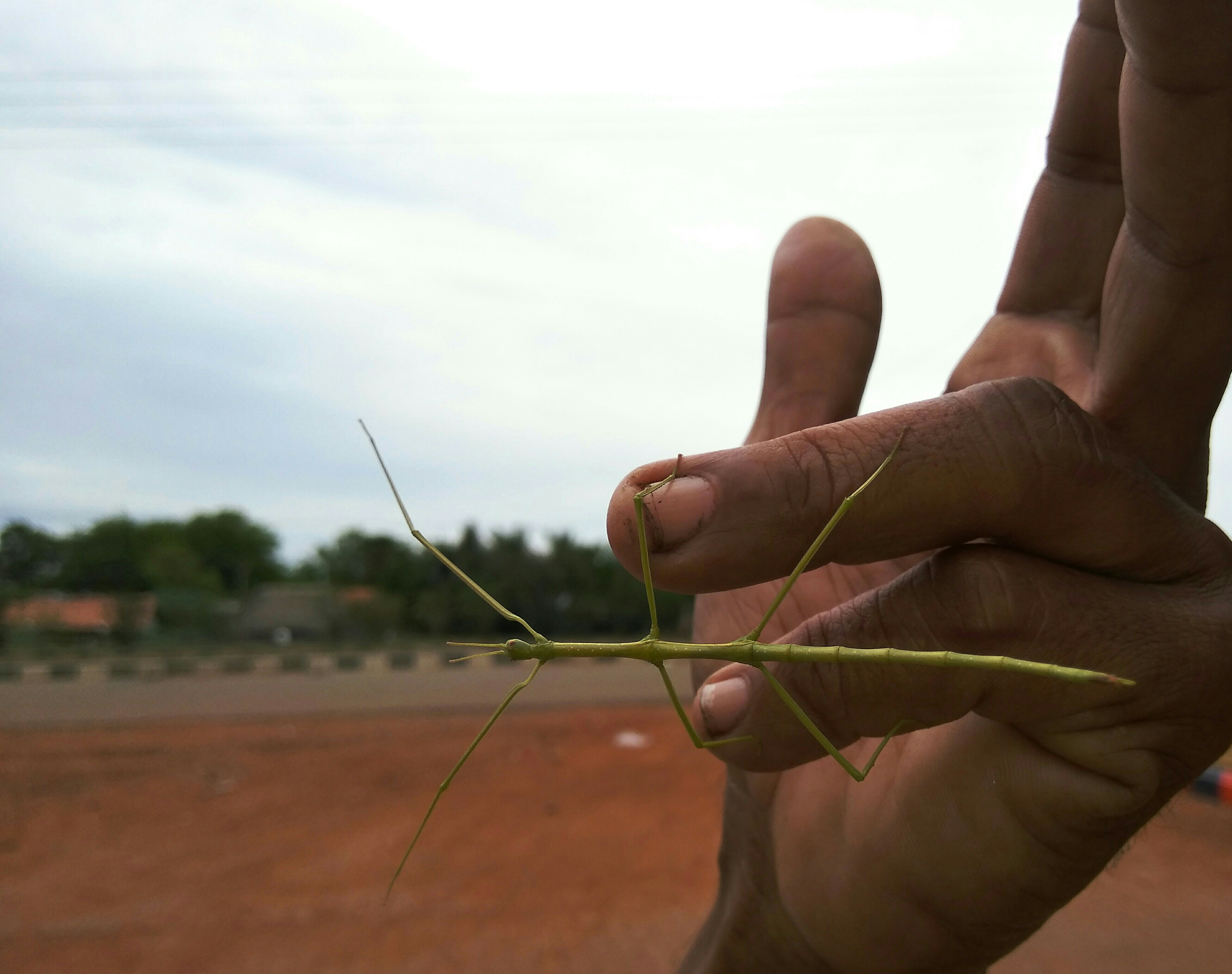
A green form

Video of a European stick insect (B. rossius)

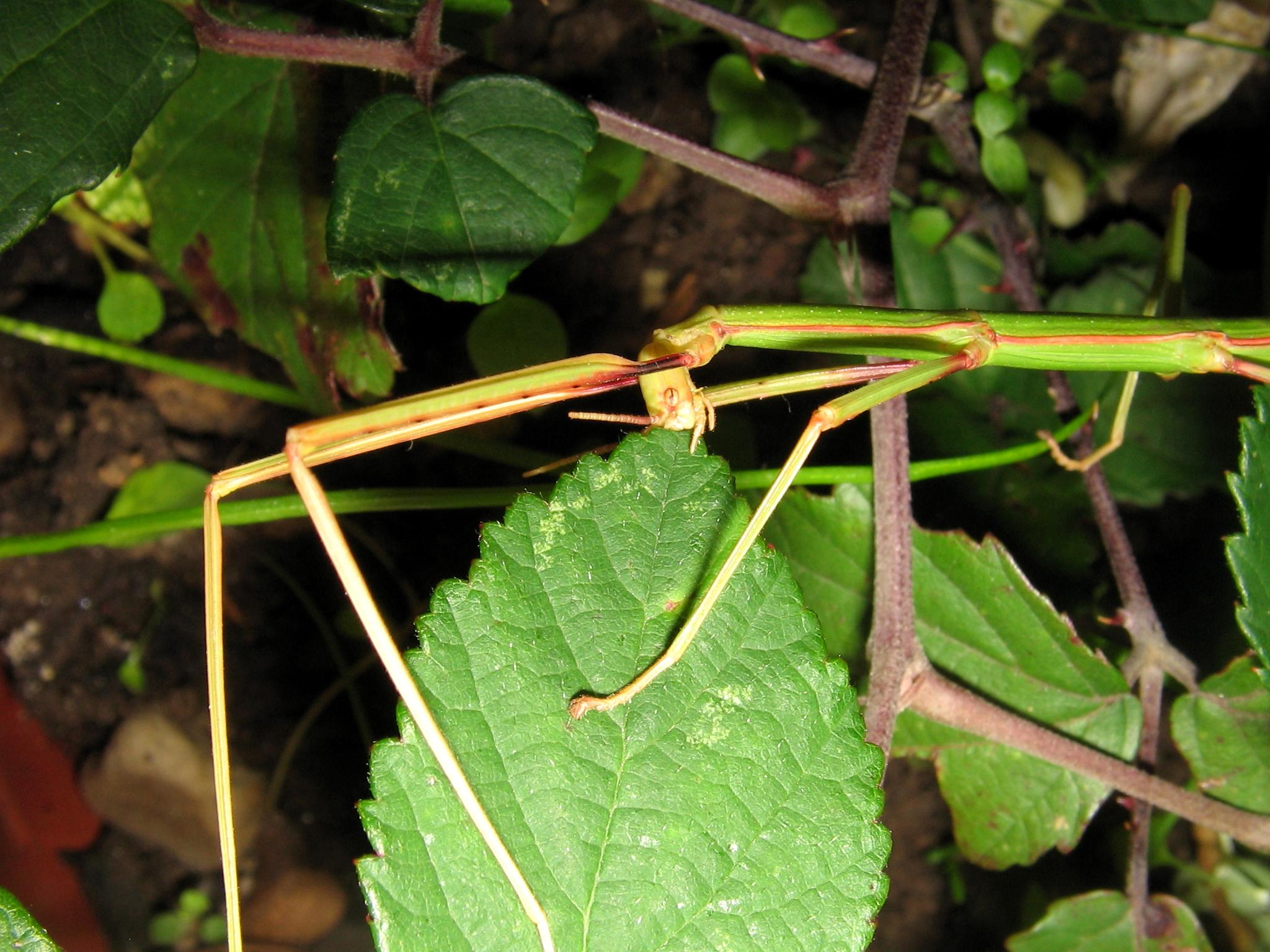
Eating a leaf of Rubus ulmifolius (mouthparts also visible)

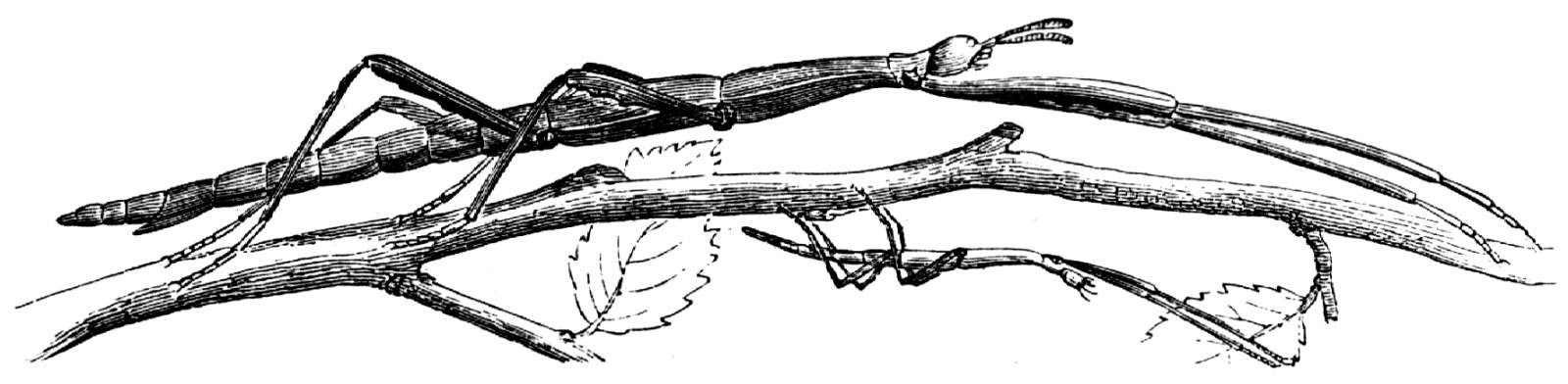
Adult and nymph

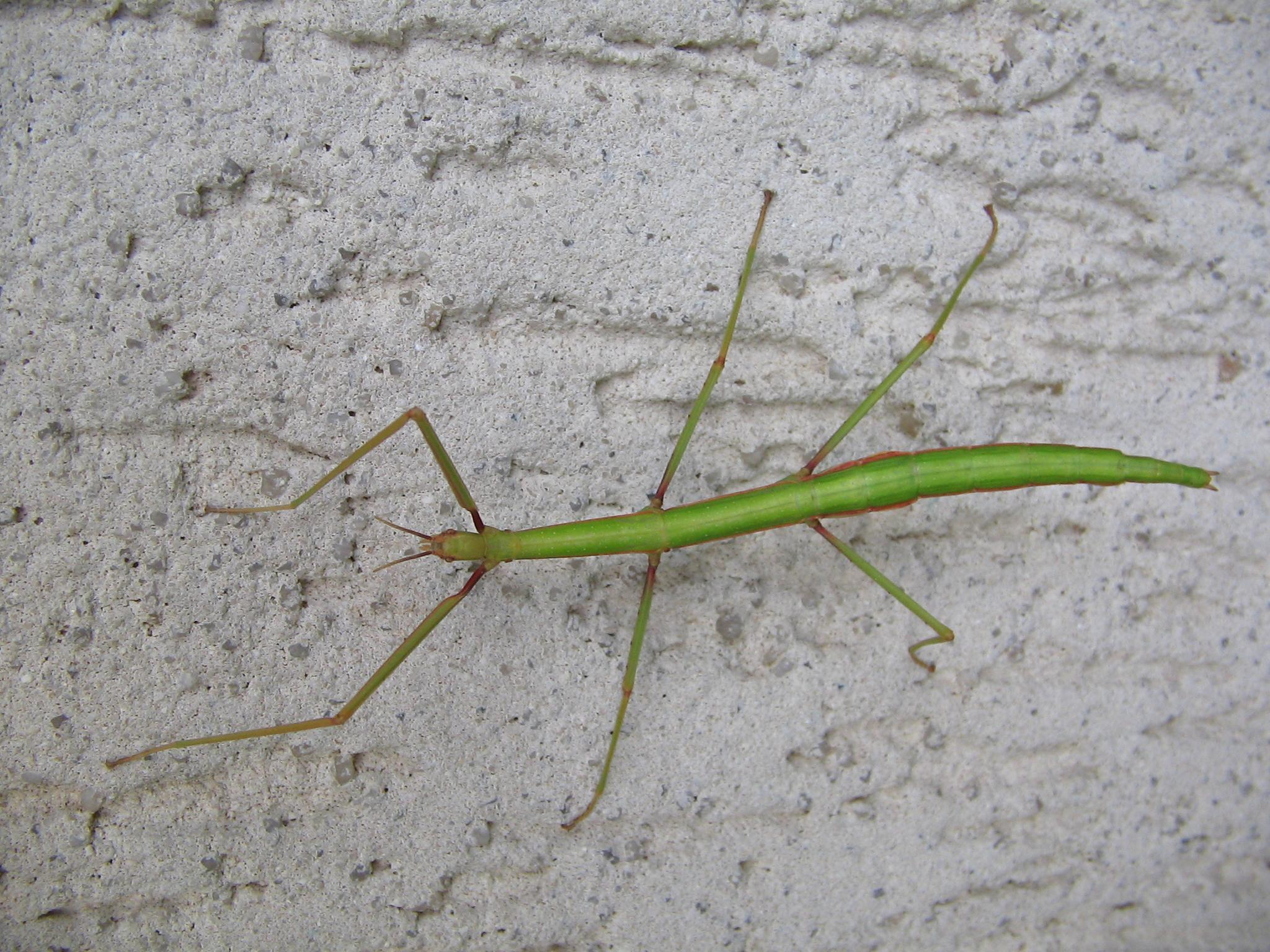
Female stick insect

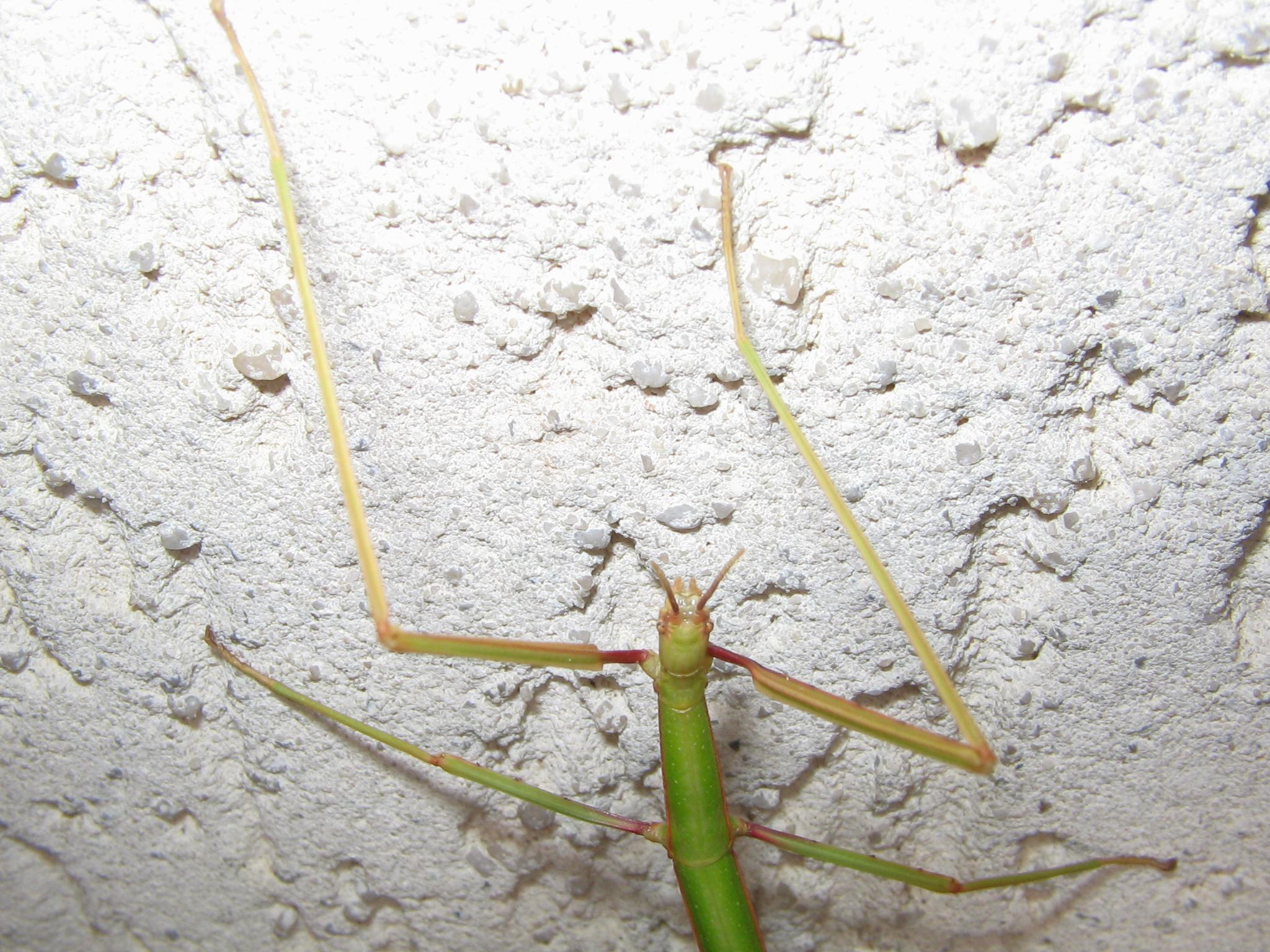
Female (head's detail)

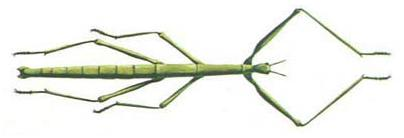
A stick bug

== See also ==
- Bacillus atticus atticus, the endemic Bacillus of Greece
