= Paragongylopus =

Scientific classification
- Domain: Eukaryota
- Kingdom: Animalia
- Phylum: Arthropoda
- Class: Insecta
- Order: Phasmatodea
- Superfamily: Bacilloidea
- Family: Bacillidae
- Tribe: Gratidiini
- Genus: Paragongylopus; Chen & He, 1997

Genus of stick insects

External image
- Image at iNaturalist

Paragongylopus is a genus of stick insects in the tribe Gratidiini, erected by S.C. Chen and Y.H. He in 1997. Species have been recorded from China, Thailand and Vietnam (possibly incomplete distribution).

== Species ==
The Phasmida Species File lists:

subgenus Paragongylopus Chen & He, 1997

1. Paragongylopus brevicornis Ho, 2019
2. Paragongylopus cheni Ho, 2017
3. Paragongylopus sinensis Chen & He, 1997 - type species (P. sinensis sinensis: 2 subspp.)

subgenus Planoparagongylopus Ho, 2017

1. Paragongylopus abramovi Ho, 2017
2. Paragongylopus lii Ho, 2017
3. Paragongylopus nabanheensis Ho, 2017
4. Paragongylopus obtusidentatus Ho, 2019
5. Paragongylopus plaumanni Zompro, 2000
