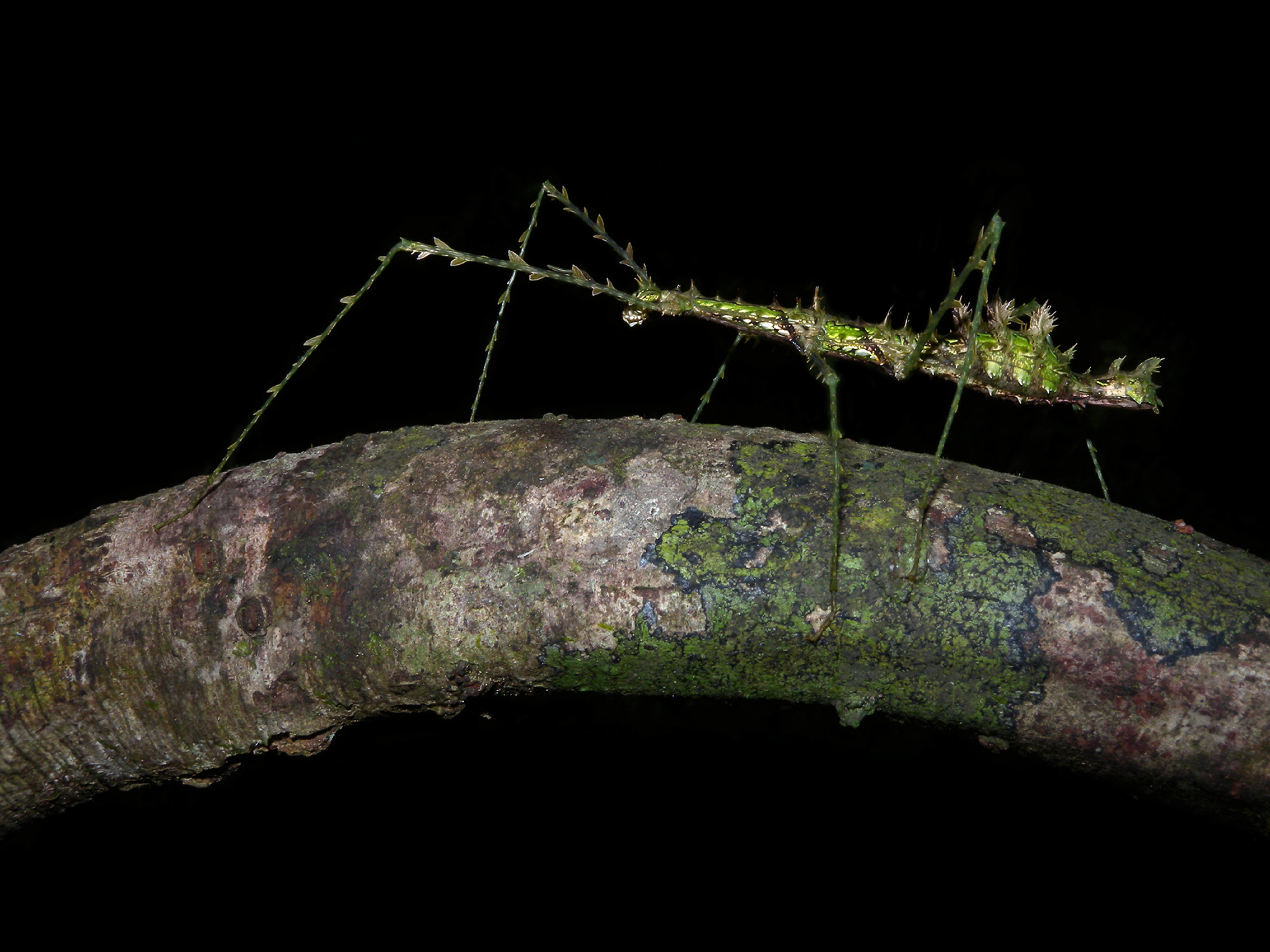

Scientific classification
- Domain: Eukaryota
- Kingdom: Animalia
- Phylum: Arthropoda
- Class: Insecta
- Order: Phasmatodea
- Family: Bacillidae
- Genus: Antongilia
- Species: A. laciniata

Binomial name
- Antongilia laciniata Redtenbacher, 1906

= Antongilia laciniata =

Species of stick insect

Antongilia laciniata is a species of stick insect endemic to the wet forests of Madagascar. It is noted for its resemblance to moss, making it hard to locate.
