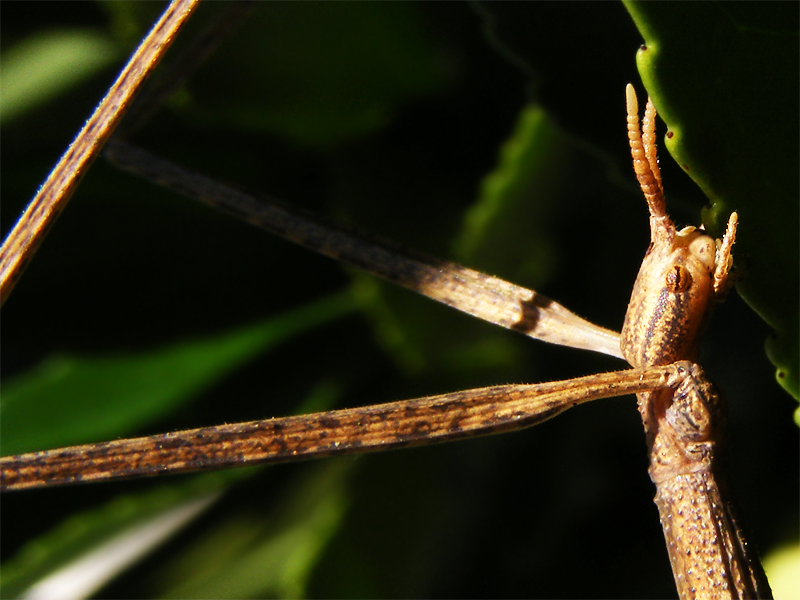
- Leptynia attenuata

Scientific classification
- Domain: Eukaryota
- Kingdom: Animalia
- Phylum: Arthropoda
- Class: Insecta
- Order: Phasmatodea
- Family: Bacillidae
- Tribe: Gratidiini
- Genus: Leptynia; Pantel, 1890

= Leptynia =

Genus of insects

Leptynia is a genus of stick insects belonging to the tribe Gratidiini. The species of this genus are found in the Iberian Peninsula.

== Species ==
GBIF lists:

- Leptynia acuta (Karsch, 1898)
- Leptynia annaepaulae Scali, Milani & Passamonti, 2012
- Leptynia attenuata Pantel, 1890
- Leptynia caprai Scali, 1996
- Leptynia montana Scali, 1996
- Leptynia platensis Piza, 1939
