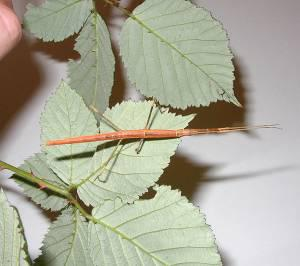

Scientific classification
- Kingdom: Animalia
- Phylum: Arthropoda
- Class: Insecta
- Order: Phasmatodea
- Family: Bacillidae
- Genus: Sceptrophasma
- Species: S. hispidulum

Binomial name
- Sceptrophasma hispidulum (Wood-Mason, 1873)

Synonyms
- Gratidia hispidula (Wood-Mason, 1873); Sceptrophasma hispidula (Wood-Mason, 1873); Paraclitumnus hispidulus (Wood-Mason, 1873); Bacillus hispidulus Wood-Mason, 1873

= Sceptrophasma hispidulum =

Species of stick insect

Sceptrophasma hispidulum, commonly known as the Andaman Islands stick insect, is a species of the stick insect family. It originates from the Andaman Islands and is commonly found in tropical forests there. They eat a variety of foliage, though in captivity they commonly eat blackberry bramble, hawthorn, oak, rose, and lettuce. The species has the Phasmid Study Group number PSG183.

== Description ==
Females grow to 7 cm long and males to 6 cm long. The colours include: brown and bronze orange, with slight shining. The eggs take 2–3 months to hatch.

== Reproduction ==
Sceptrophasma hispidulum must have both males and female parents for the ova to hatch. Females will stick their eggs just about everywhere. The ova are 0.8 cm long and are of slightly arched form. The eggs are rather fragile and take 2–3 months to hatch.
