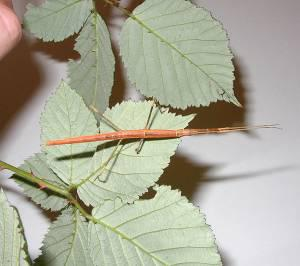
- Sceptrophasma hispidulum

Scientific classification
- Kingdom: Animalia
- Phylum: Arthropoda
- Class: Insecta
- Order: Phasmatodea
- Family: Bacillidae
- Tribe: Gratidiini
- Genus: Sceptrophasma; Brock & Seow-Choen, 2000

= Sceptrophasma =

Genus of insects

Sceptrophasma is a genus of stick insects belonging to the tribe Gratidiini. The species of this genus are found in Central Asia and Southern Asia.

== Species ==
GBIF lists:

- Sceptrophasma bituberculatum (Redtenbacher, 1889)
- Sceptrophasma hispidulum (Wood-Mason, 1873)
- Sceptrophasma humilis (Westwood, 1859)
- Sceptrophasma langkawicense Brock & Seow-Choen, 2000
