= Zehntneria =

Scientific classification
- Kingdom: Animalia
- Phylum: Arthropoda
- Class: Insecta
- Order: Phasmatodea
- Family: Bacillidae
- Tribe: Gratidiini
- Genus: Zehntneria; Brunner von Wattenwyl, 1907

Genus of insects

Zehntneria is a genus of stick insects belonging to the tribe Gratidiini. The species of this genus are found in Central Asia and Southern Asia.

== Species ==
GBIF lists:

- Zehntneria desciscens Brunner von Wattenwyl, 1907
- Zehntneria mystica Brunner von Wattenwyl, 1907
- Zehntneria secundaria Brunner von Wattenwyl, 1907
