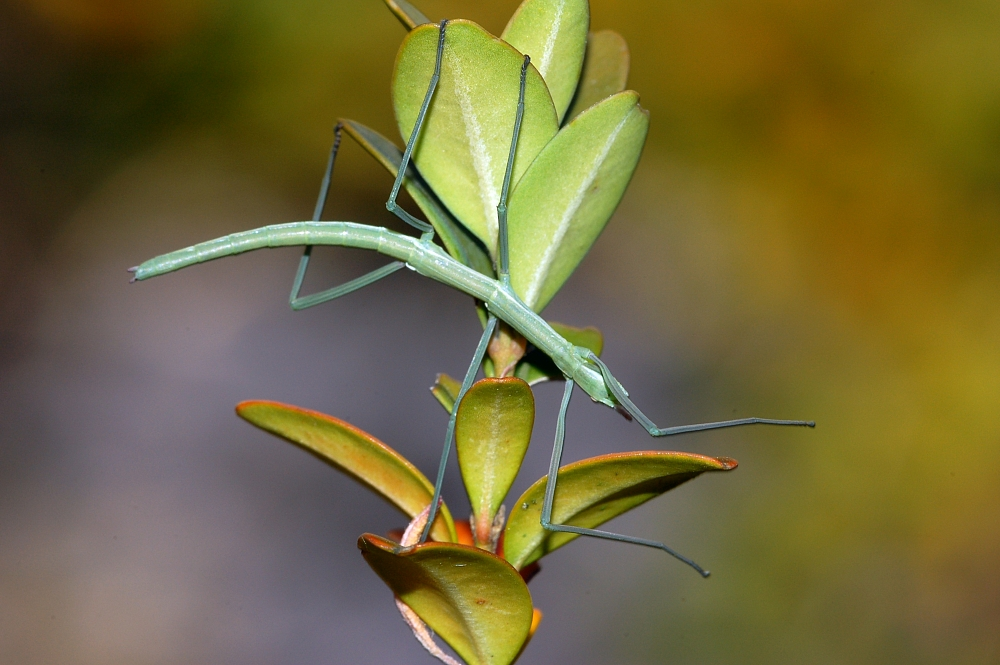
- Pijnackeria hispanica

Scientific classification
- Domain: Eukaryota
- Kingdom: Animalia
- Phylum: Arthropoda
- Class: Insecta
- Order: Phasmatodea
- Family: Bacillidae
- Tribe: Gratidiini
- Genus: Pijnackeria; Scali, 2009

= Pijnackeria =

Genus of insects

Pijnackeria is a genus of stick insects belonging to the tribe Gratidiini.

The species of this genus are found in Southern Europe.

== Species ==
The Phasmida Species File and GBIF include:

1. Pijnackeria barbarae Scali, Milani & Passamonti, 2013
2. Pijnackeria hispanica (Bolívar, 1878) - type species (as Bacillus hispanicus Bolívar [Y Urrutia])
3. Pijnackeria lelongi Scali, Milani & Passamonti, 2013
4. Pijnackeria lucianae Scali, Milani & Passamonti, 2013
5. Pijnackeria masettii Scali, Milani & Passamonti, 2013
6. Pijnackeria originis Scali, Milani & Passamonti, 2013
7. Pijnackeria recondita Valero & Ortiz, 2015
