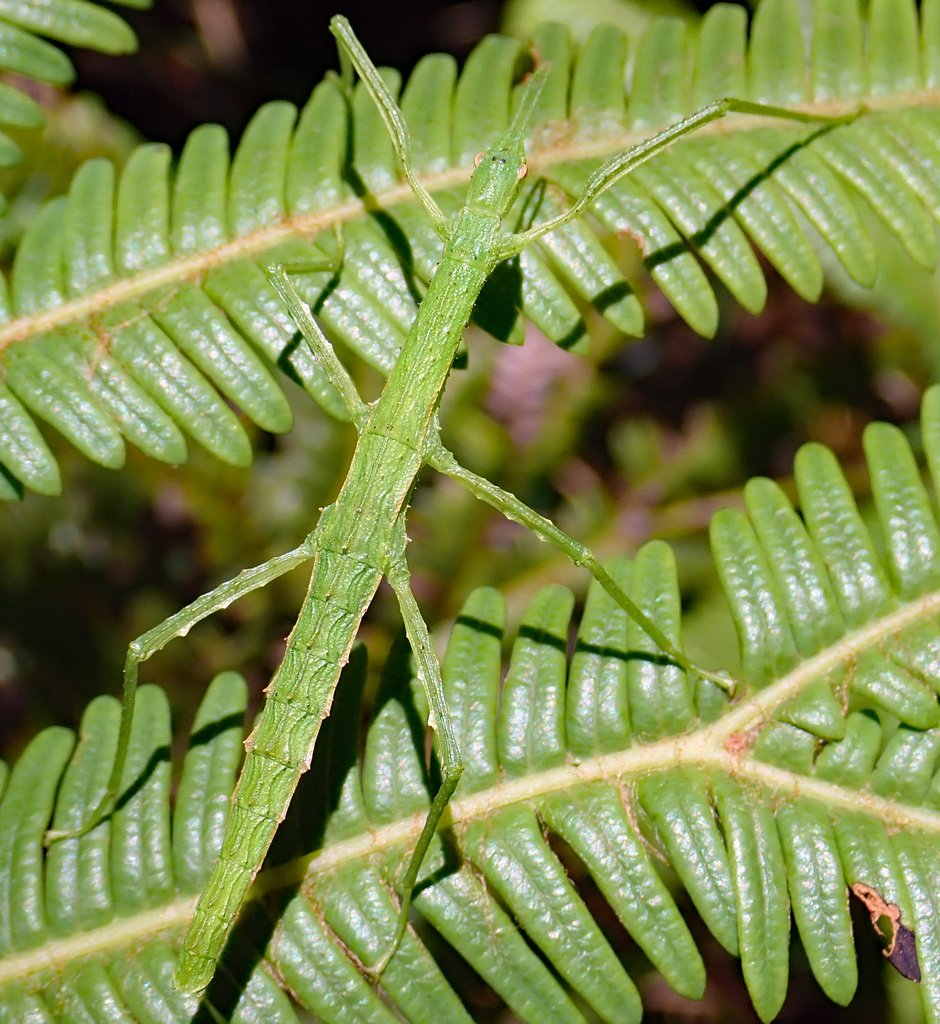
- A green Spinotectarchus acornutus in Kaimai Mamaku Conservation Park

Scientific classification
- Kingdom: Animalia
- Phylum: Arthropoda
- Clade: Pancrustacea
- Class: Insecta
- Order: Phasmatodea
- Family: Phasmatidae
- Subfamily: Pachymorphinae
- Tribe: Hemipachymorphini
- Genus: Spinotectarchus; Salmon, 1991
- Species: S. acornutus

Binomial name
- Spinotectarchus acornutus (Hutton, 1899)

= Spinotectarchus =

Genus of stick insects

Spinotectarchus acornutus is a species of stick insect endemic to New Zealand. It belongs to the family Diapheromeridae, and is the only member of the genus Spinotectarchus. It is commonly referred to as the spiny ridge-backed stick insect.

== Description ==
These stick insects are fairly small, with the body size of females reaching up to 4.8 cm long. Males have a body size of 3.5 to 3.7 cm long. Both males and females come in various colour forms and patterns, ranging from brown to green. Females are bigger, and have a more ridged appearance to their dorsal side. All the legs appear serrated, due to the presence of numerous "teeth". Males are smaller and skinnier, appearing only faintly ridge-backed, and with less prominent "teeth" on the legs compared to the female. An interesting character is that the eggs of Spinotectarchus acornutus are covered in short spines giving it a hairy appearance. This trait is also shared with Asteliaphasma, another genus of endemic stick insects. However, these stick insects can be distinguished by other traits such as the morphology of their genitalia. Studies have shown that S. acornutus is unrelated to other stick insect genera in New Zealand.

== Habitat and distribution ==
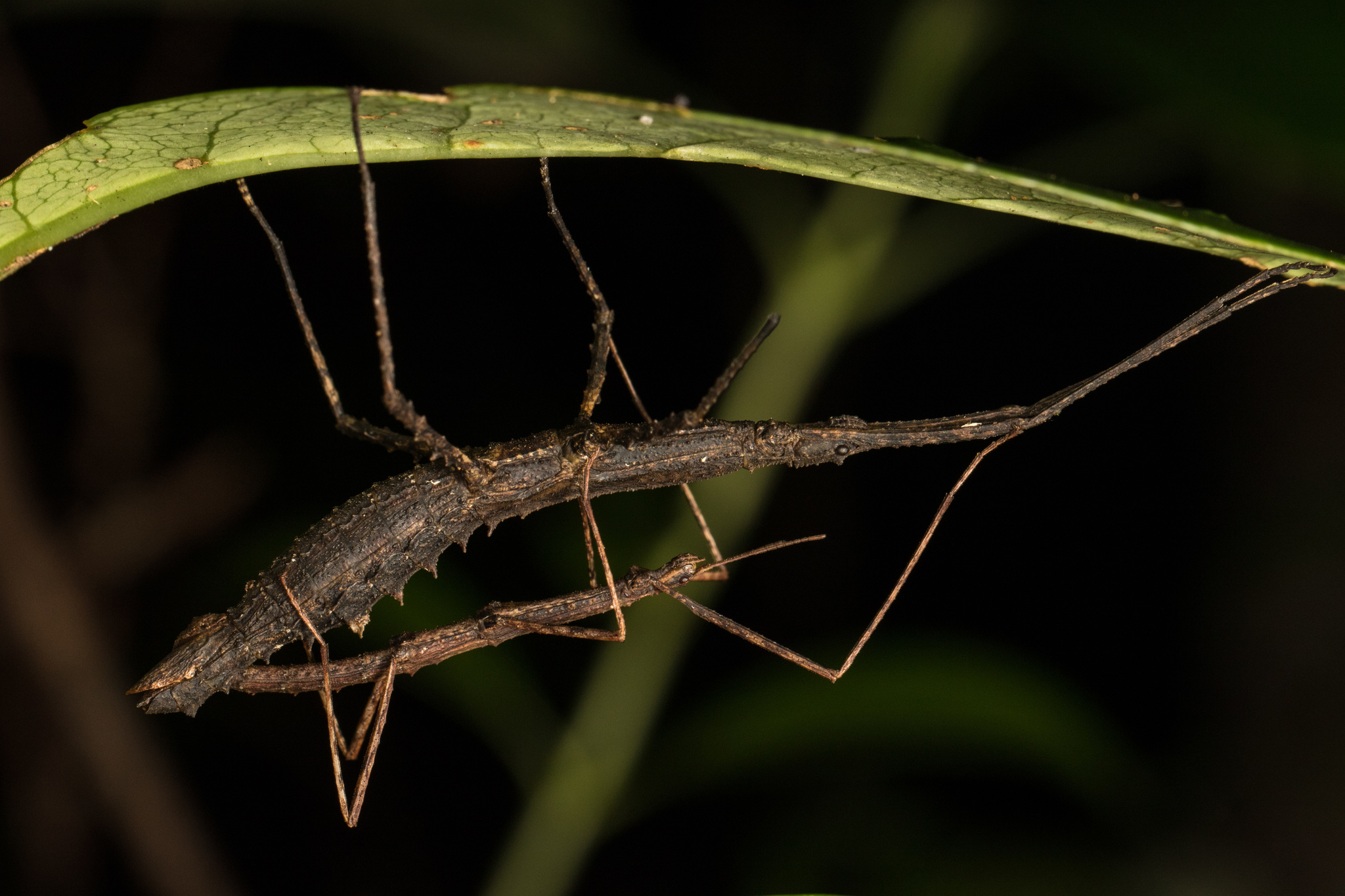
Spinotectarchus acornutus mating

Spinotectarchus acornutus is restricted to the north of the North Island of New Zealand, as well as some offshore islands. The type specimen described by Frederick Hutton in 1899 was collected from Great Barrier Island. It is currently held in the Canterbury Museum in Christchurch. This species inhabits native bush and regenerated forest in Northland. They can be most commonly found on Metrosideros perforata (climbing rātā), Dendroconche scandens (fragrant fern), the epiphyte Collospermum hastatum, and Dysoxylum spectabile (kohekohe).

== See also ==
- List of stick insects of New Zealand
