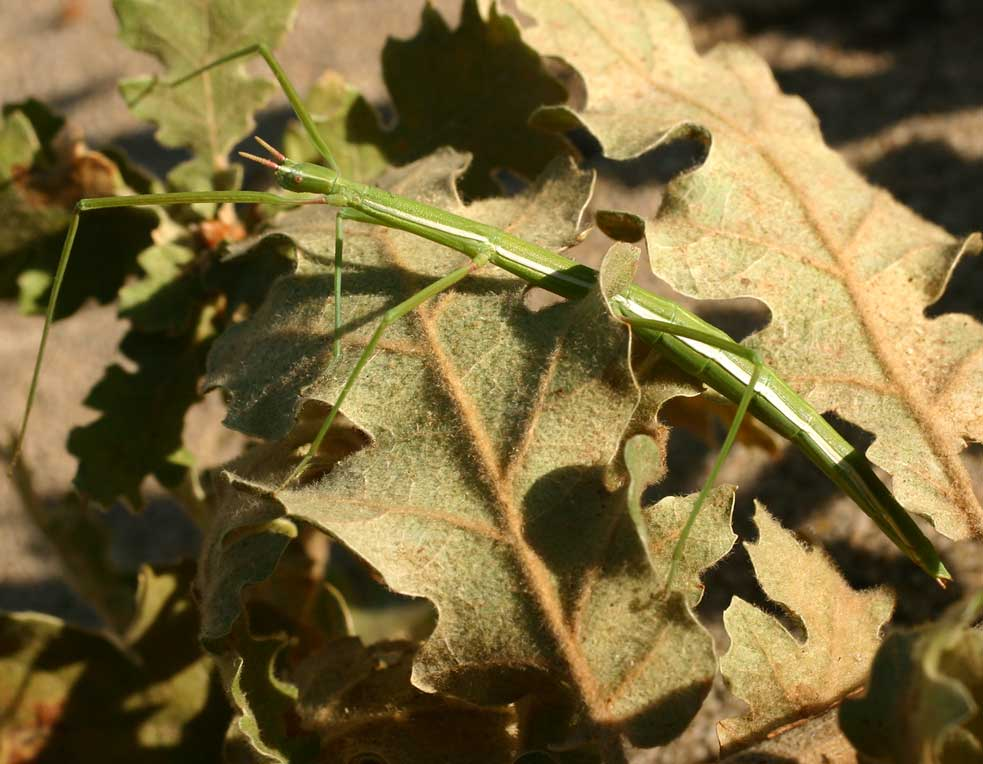
- Clonopsis gallica

Scientific classification
- Domain: Eukaryota
- Kingdom: Animalia
- Phylum: Arthropoda
- Class: Insecta
- Order: Phasmatodea
- Family: Bacillidae
- Tribe: Bacillini
- Genus: Clonopsis; Pantel, 1915

= Clonopsis =

ToroStecco

Genus of stick insects

Clonopsis is a stick insect genus in the family Bacillidae. Species have been recorded from mainland Europe and North Africa.

== Species ==
- Clonopsis algerica (Pantel, 1890) - type species (as Bacillus algericus Pantel)
- Clonopsis felicitatis Scali & Milani, 2009
- Clonopsis gallica (Charpentier, 1825)
- Clonopsis maroccana Bullini & Nascetti, 1987
- Clonopsis soumiae Scali & Milani, 2009
