= Pachymorpha =

Scientific classification
- Domain: Eukaryota
- Kingdom: Animalia
- Phylum: Arthropoda
- Class: Insecta
- Order: Phasmatodea
- Family: Phasmatidae
- Tribe: Pachymorphini
- Genus: Pachymorpha; Gray, 1835

Genus of insects

Pachymorpha is a genus of phasmids belonging to the family Diapheromeridae.

The species of this genus are found in Australasia, Africa, Madagascar and tropical Asia up to southern China.

== Species ==
The Phasmida Species File lists:

- Pachymorpha arguta Chen & Y.H.He, 2008
- Pachymorpha belocerca Chen & Y.H.He, 2008
- Pachymorpha carli (Günther, 1937)
- Pachymorpha congensis Brunner von Wattenwyl, 1907
- Pachymorpha darnis (Westwood, 1859)
- Pachymorpha epidicus (Günther, 1935)
- Pachymorpha madagassa Brunner von Wattenwyl, 1907
- Pachymorpha meruensis Sjöstedt, 1909
- Pachymorpha sansibarica Brunner von Wattenwyl, 1907
- Pachymorpha simplicipes Serville, 1838
- Pachymorpha spinosa Brock & Hasenpusch, 2007
- Pachymorpha squalida (Gray, 1833) = type species (as Bacillus squalidus Gray; locality Australia)
- Pachymorpha staeli (Brunner von Wattenwyl, 1893)
