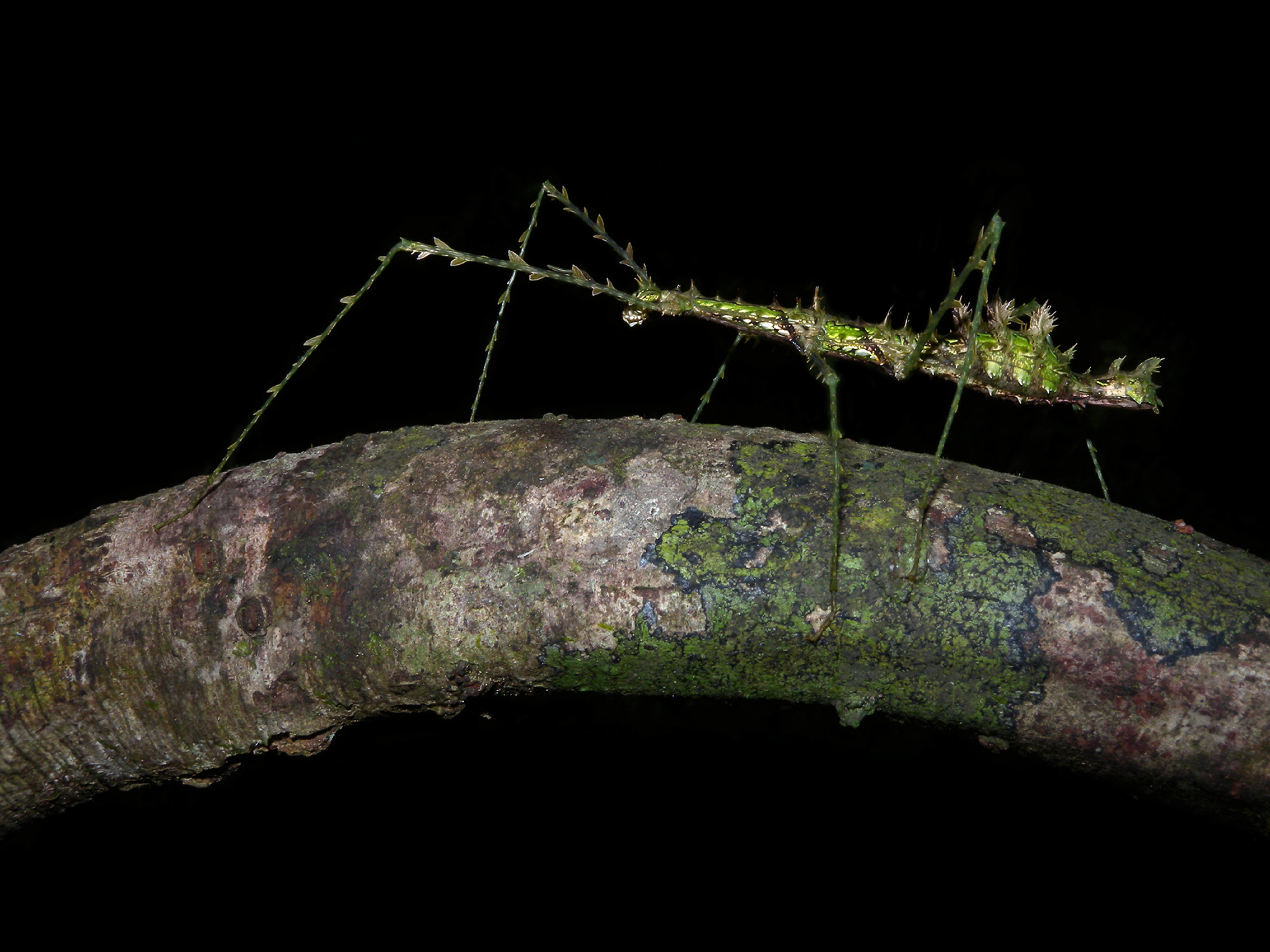
- Antongilia laciniata

Scientific classification
- Domain: Eukaryota
- Kingdom: Animalia
- Phylum: Arthropoda
- Class: Insecta
- Order: Phasmatodea
- Family: Bacillidae
- Subfamily: Antongiliinae
- Genus: Antongilia; Redtenbacher, 1906

= Antongilia =

Genus of stick insects

Antongilia is a genus of stick insects endemic to Madagascar.

Species in the genus include:

- A. annulicornis Redtenbacher, 1906
- A. chopardi Cliquennois, 2003
- A. laciniata Redtenbacher, 1906
- A. madagassa (Brunner von Wattenwyl, 1907)
- A. muricata Redtenbacher, 1906
- A. pungens Redtenbacher, 1906
- A. quadrituberculata Redtenbacher, 1906
- A. unispinosa Carl, 1913
