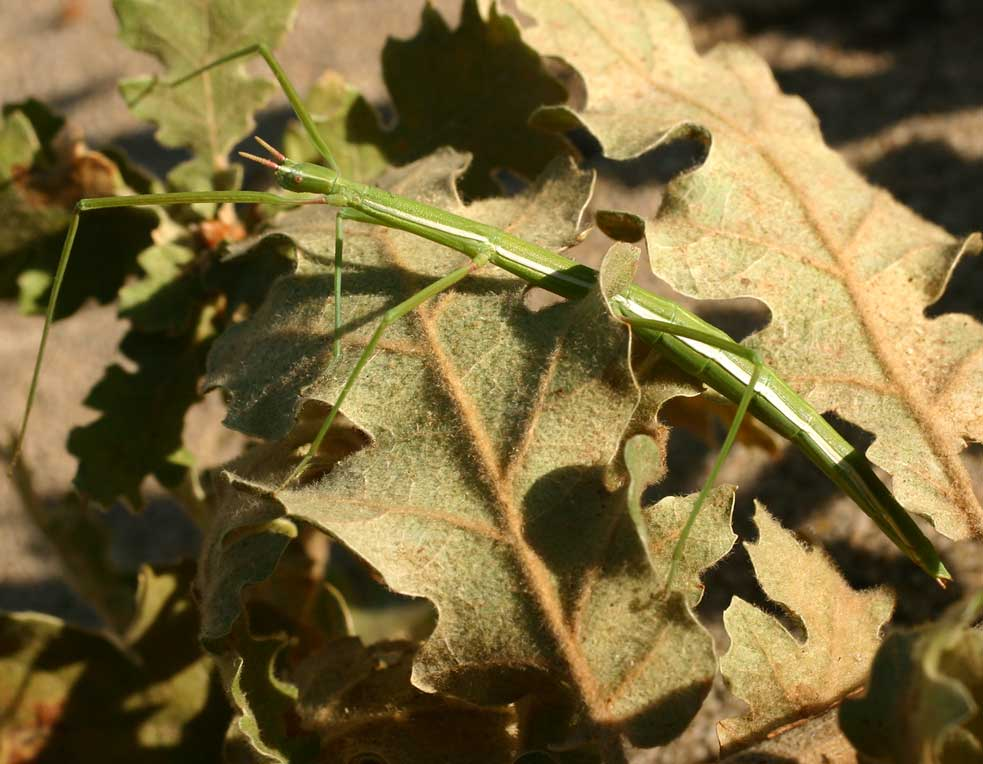
- Clonopsis gallica

Scientific classification
- Domain: Eukaryota
- Kingdom: Animalia
- Phylum: Arthropoda
- Class: Insecta
- Order: Phasmatodea
- Family: Bacillidae
- Genus: Clonopsis
- Species: C. gallica

Binomial name
- Clonopsis gallica (Charpentier, 1825)

Synonyms
- Bacillus (Clonopsis) gallicus affinis Salfi, 1925; Bacillus granulatus Brullé, 1832; Bacillus gallicus occidentalis Bolívar, 1894

= Clonopsis gallica =

Species of stick insect

Clonopsis gallica is a stick insect species in the genus Clonopsis. It has been recorded from: Croatia, France (including Corsica), Jersey, Italy (including Sicily, Sardinia and most of the minor islands) Portugal (including Azores), Spain (including Majorca), Madeira, Tenerife and North-Western Africa.

This species is a stable, obligate parthenogen.
