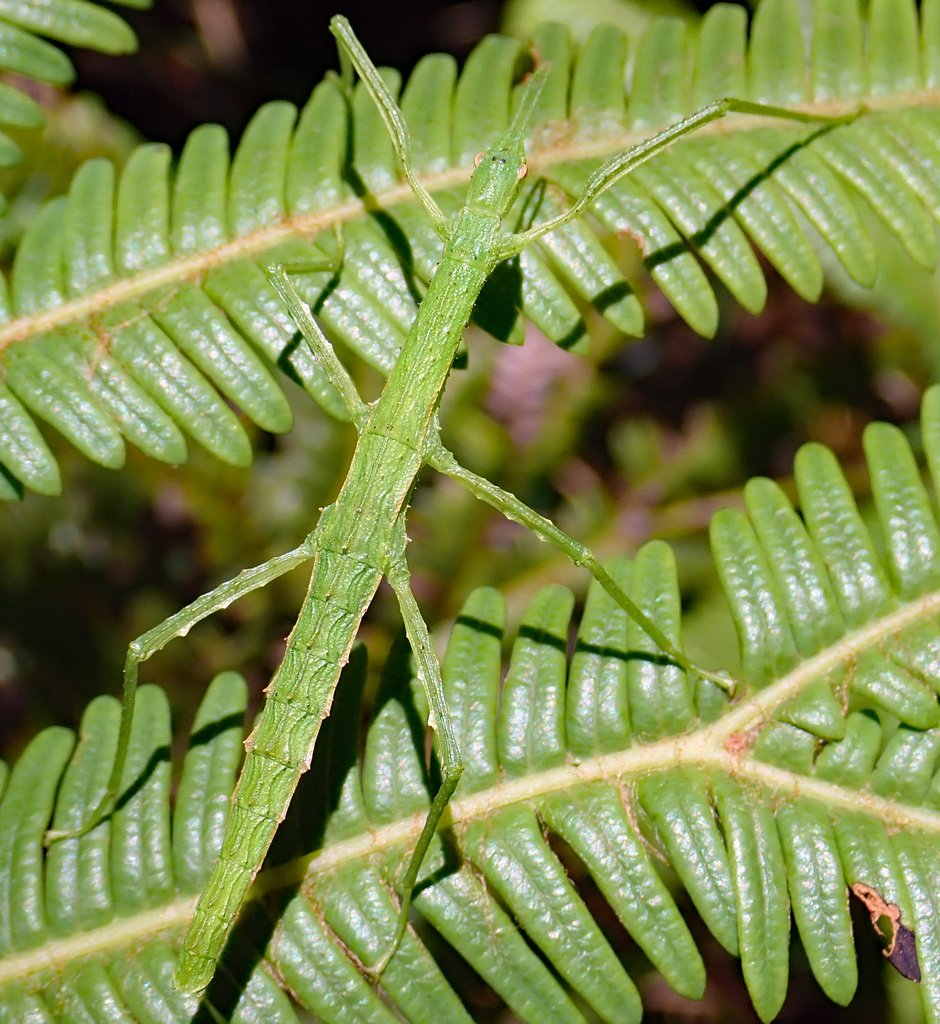
- Spinotectarchus acornutus

Scientific classification
- Kingdom: Animalia
- Phylum: Arthropoda
- Class: Insecta
- Order: Phasmatodea
- Family: Phasmatidae
- Subfamily: Pachymorphinae; Brunner von Wattenwyl, 1893

Synonyms
- Pachymorphae Brunner von Wattenwyl, 1893

= Pachymorphinae =

Subfamily of stick insects

Pachymorphinae is a subfamily of stick insects in the family Phasmatidae. Genera are primarily found in Africa, Asia and Australia.

== Tribes and genera ==
The Phasmida Species File lists two tribes (Gratidiini has been moved):

=== Hemipachymorphini ===
Authority: Günther, 1953

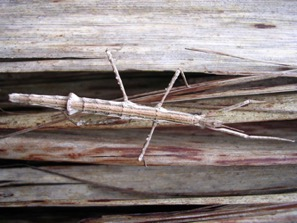
Tectarchus salebrosus

- Hemipachymorpha Kirby, 1904
- Pseudopromachus Günther, 1929
- Spinotectarchus Salmon, 1991
- Tectarchus Salmon, 1954

=== Pachymorphini ===
Authority: Brunner von Wattenwyl, 1893

- Acanthoderus Gray, 1835
- Asteliaphasma Jewell & Brock, 2003
- Micrarchus Carl, 1913
- Miniphasma Zompro, 2007
- Niveaphasma Jewell & Brock, 2003
- Pachymorpha Gray, 1835
