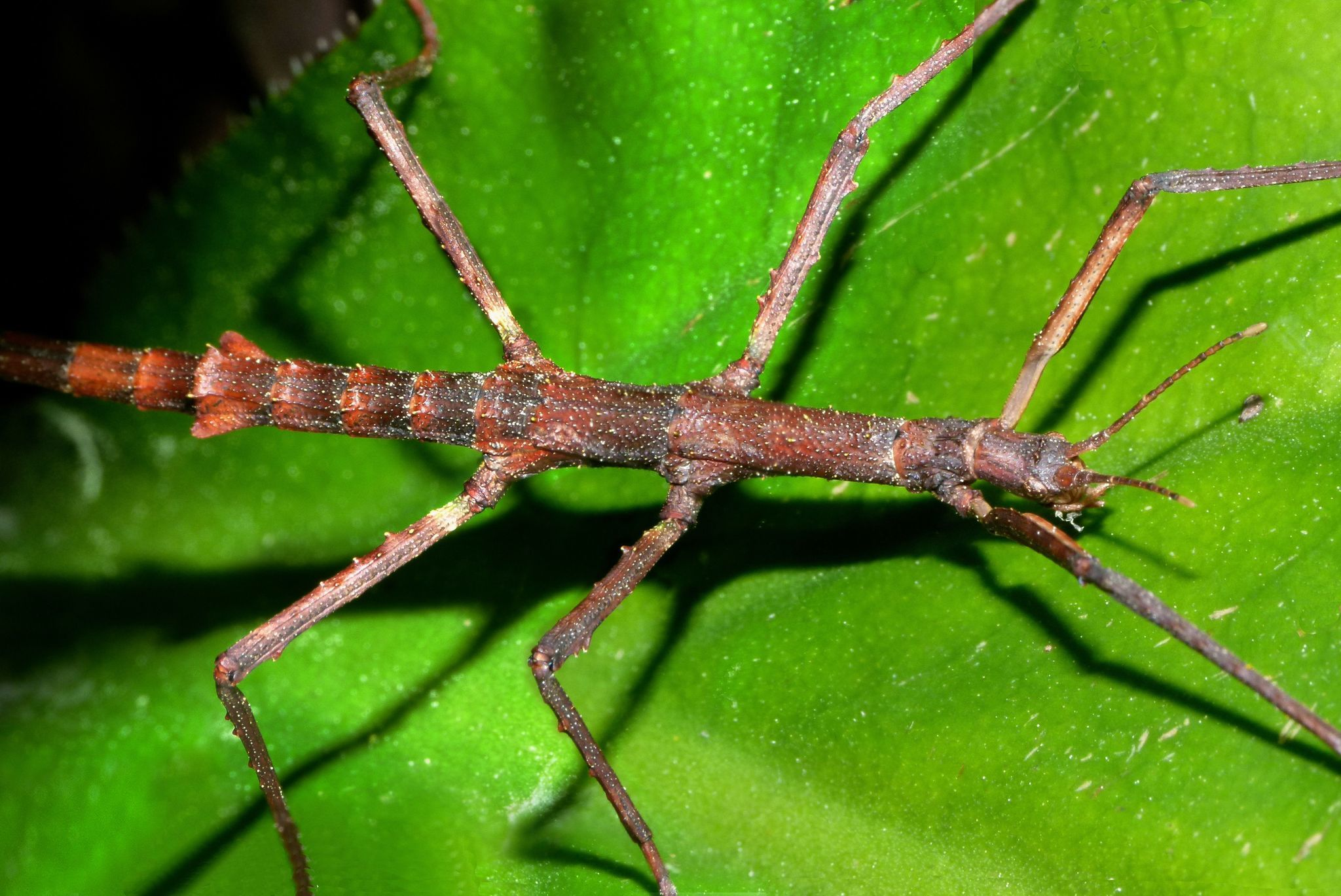

Scientific classification
- Kingdom: Animalia
- Phylum: Arthropoda
- Class: Insecta
- Order: Phasmatodea
- Family: Phasmatidae
- Subfamily: Pachymorphinae
- Tribe: Pachymorphini
- Genus: Niveaphasma; Jewell & Brock, 2003
- Species: N. annulata

Binomial name
- Niveaphasma annulata (Hutton, 1898)

= Niveaphasma =

Genus of stick insects

Niveaphasma annulata is a species of stick insect found in New Zealand.

It is the sole member of the genus Niveaphasma which is unique among stick insects because it can be found living in alpine areas. Niveaphasma annulata is sister to the New Zealand stick insect Asteliaphasma jucunda.

== Distribution and habitat ==
Niveaphasma annulata is restricted to the southern half of South Island. It is absent from the North Island and has not been observed north of Arthur's Pass.
