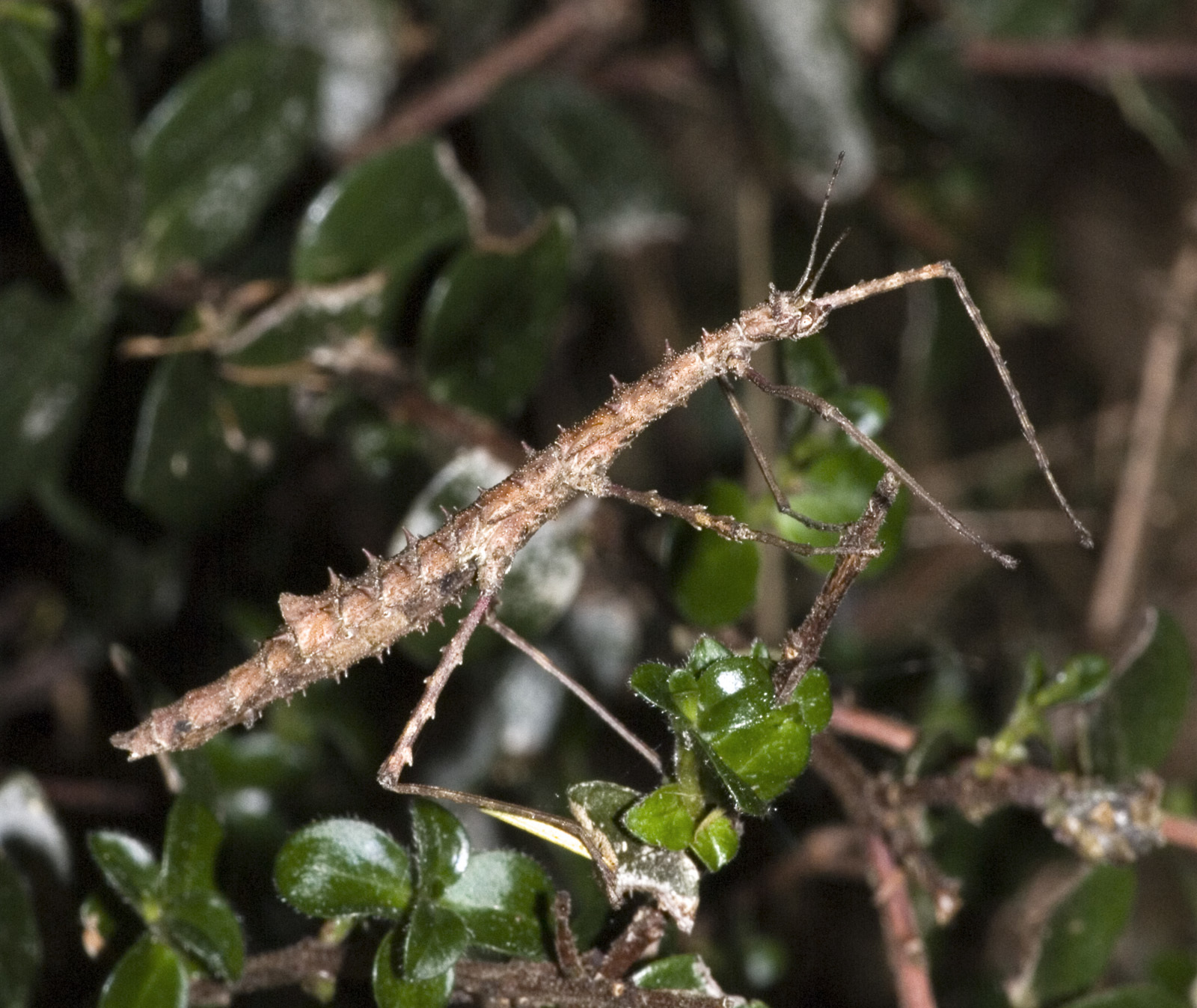

Scientific classification
- Kingdom: Animalia
- Phylum: Arthropoda
- Class: Insecta
- Order: Phasmatodea
- Family: Phasmatidae
- Genus: Micrarchus
- Species: M. hystriculeus

Binomial name
- Micrarchus hystriculeus (Westwood, 1859)

= Micrarchus hystriculeus =

Species of insect

Micrarchus hystriculeus is a species of flightless stick insect (order Phasmatodea) in the family Phasmatidae, and is endemic to New Zealand. It was first described by John Obadiah Westwood in 1859. It is a widespread species of the genus Micrarchus and the only species recorded on North Island. This species is known for its sexual size dimorphism, prolonged mating behaviour, and male-biased sex ratio. It is currently classified as Not Threatened under the New Zealand Threat Classification System.

== Description ==
Micrarchus hystriculeus is apterous (wingless) and exhibit sexual size dimorphism. Adult females are larger than males, exceeding 56 mm in length, with proportionally longer mid and hind legs, which support their larger abdomens. Males are less than 50 mm in length, and are equipped with elongate tong-like claspers armed with a series of black teeth, used to grasp females during copulation. This species is generally small, brown in colour with two rows of spines on their backs and spiky flangers on legs. Their eggs are distinctive and used for species identification. Eggs have spine-like setae absent and the capsules are 1.7–2.4 times longer than broad. They have a prominent keel arising steeply and a capitulum (knob-like structure) that is very short, flatly conical, and sharply pointed.

Identification features:

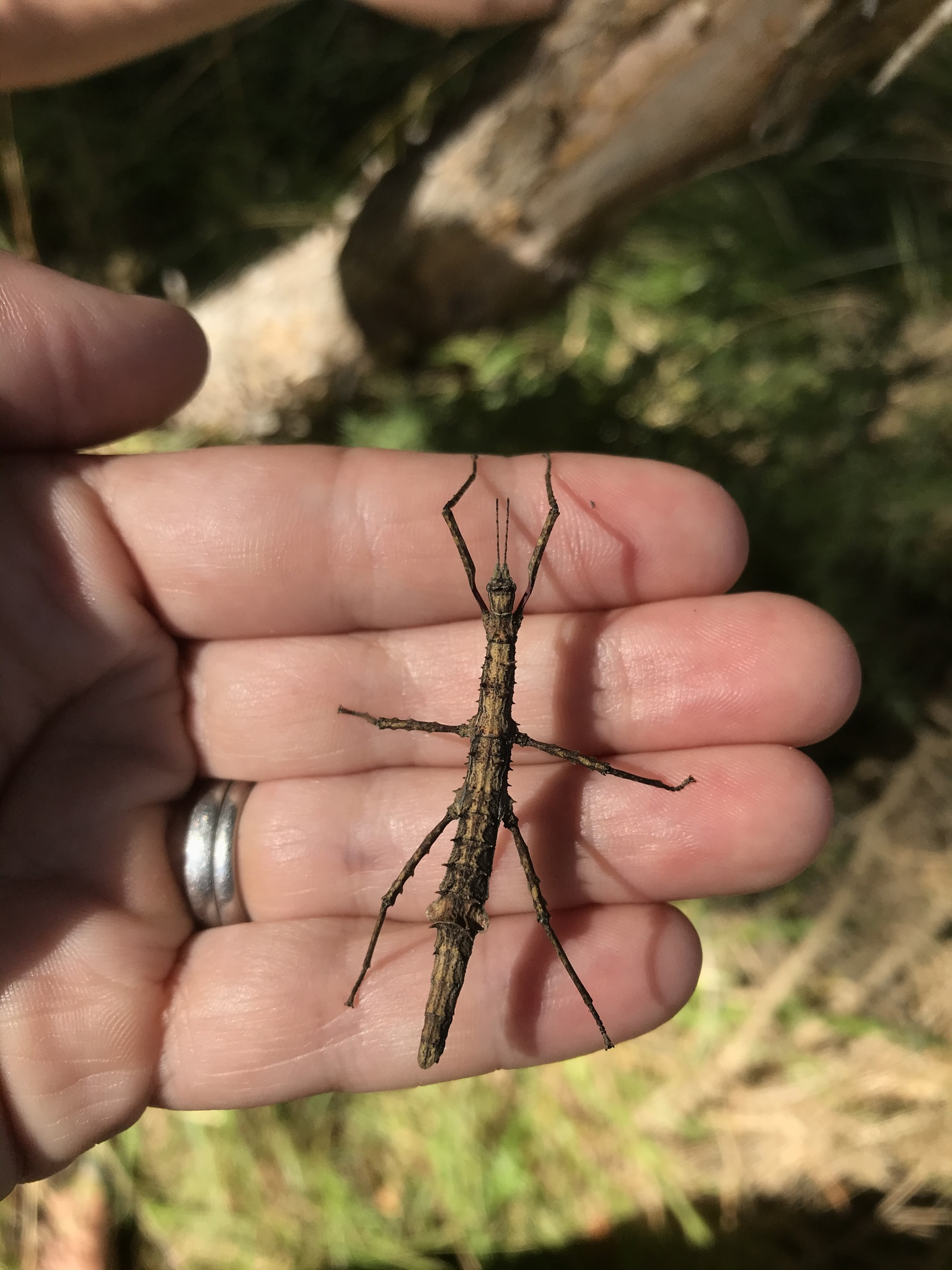
Female

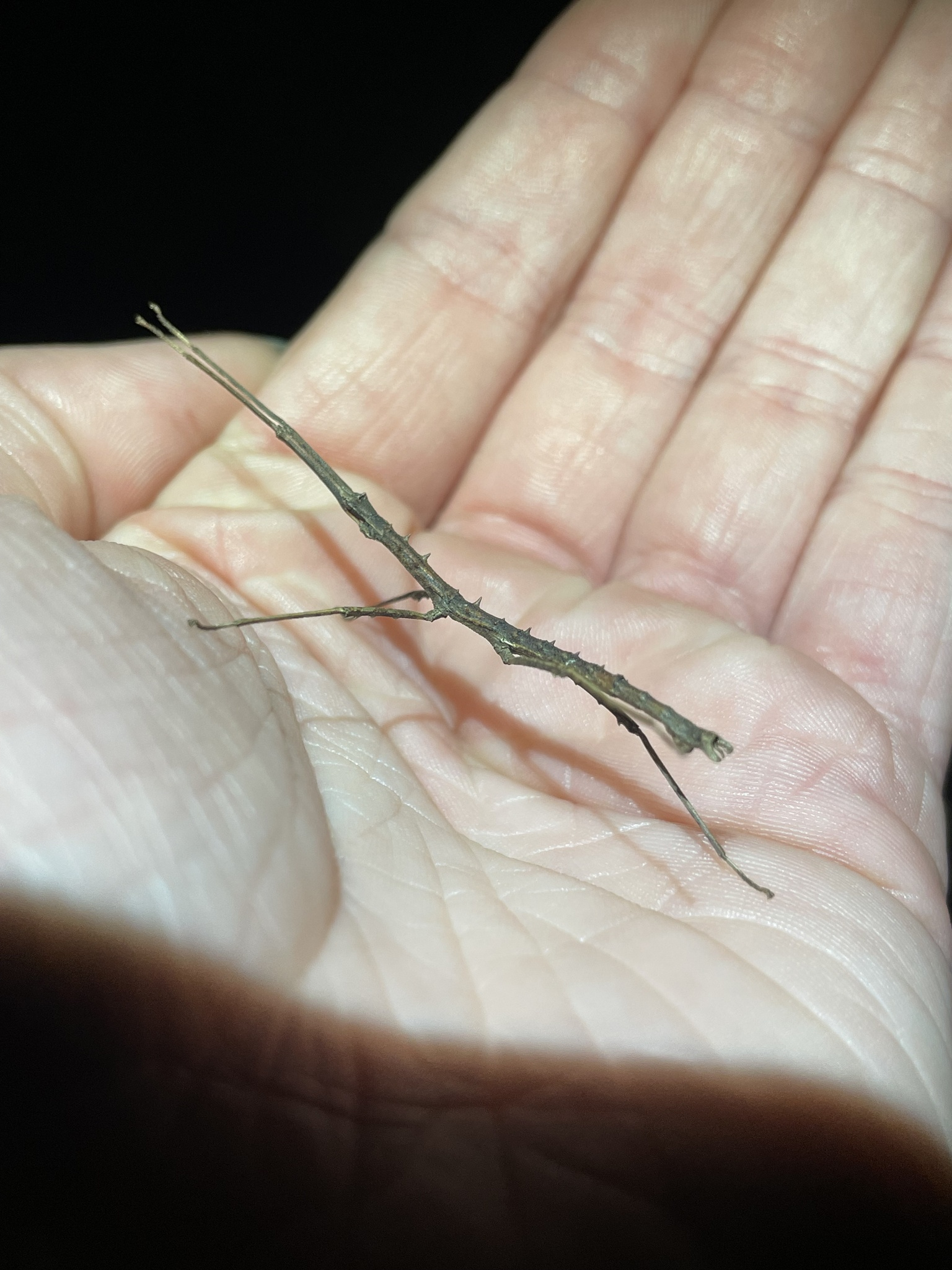
Male

Female

- Cerci distinctly shorter than the anal segment, not reaching the tip of the anal segment
- Metatarsals of the mid and hind limbs lacking a dorsal lobe
- Operculum extending up to halfway along the anal segment

Males

- Claspers forming elongate tong-like pinchers with separate black teeth
- Dorsal abdominal spines located on the anterior margin of each tergite

== Distribution and habitat ==
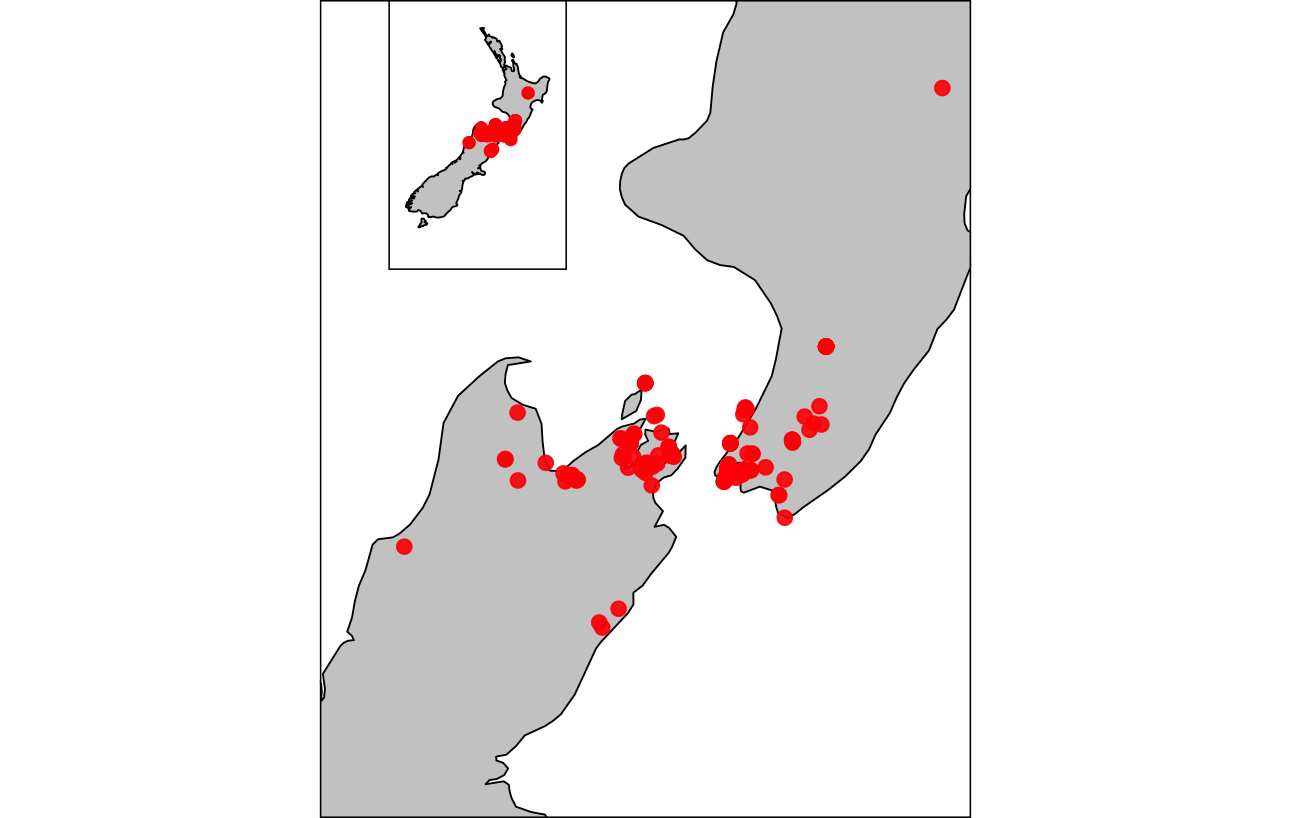
Distribution map of Micrarchus hystriculeus based on observations from iNaturalist (Red points).

This species is widely distributed throughout New Zealand, and is the only member of its genus found on the North Island. It inhabits lowland arboreal habitats and is considered an ecological generalist. Although this species is present in alpine areas, it is less cold-hardy compared to other Micrarchus species.

== Biology and ecology ==
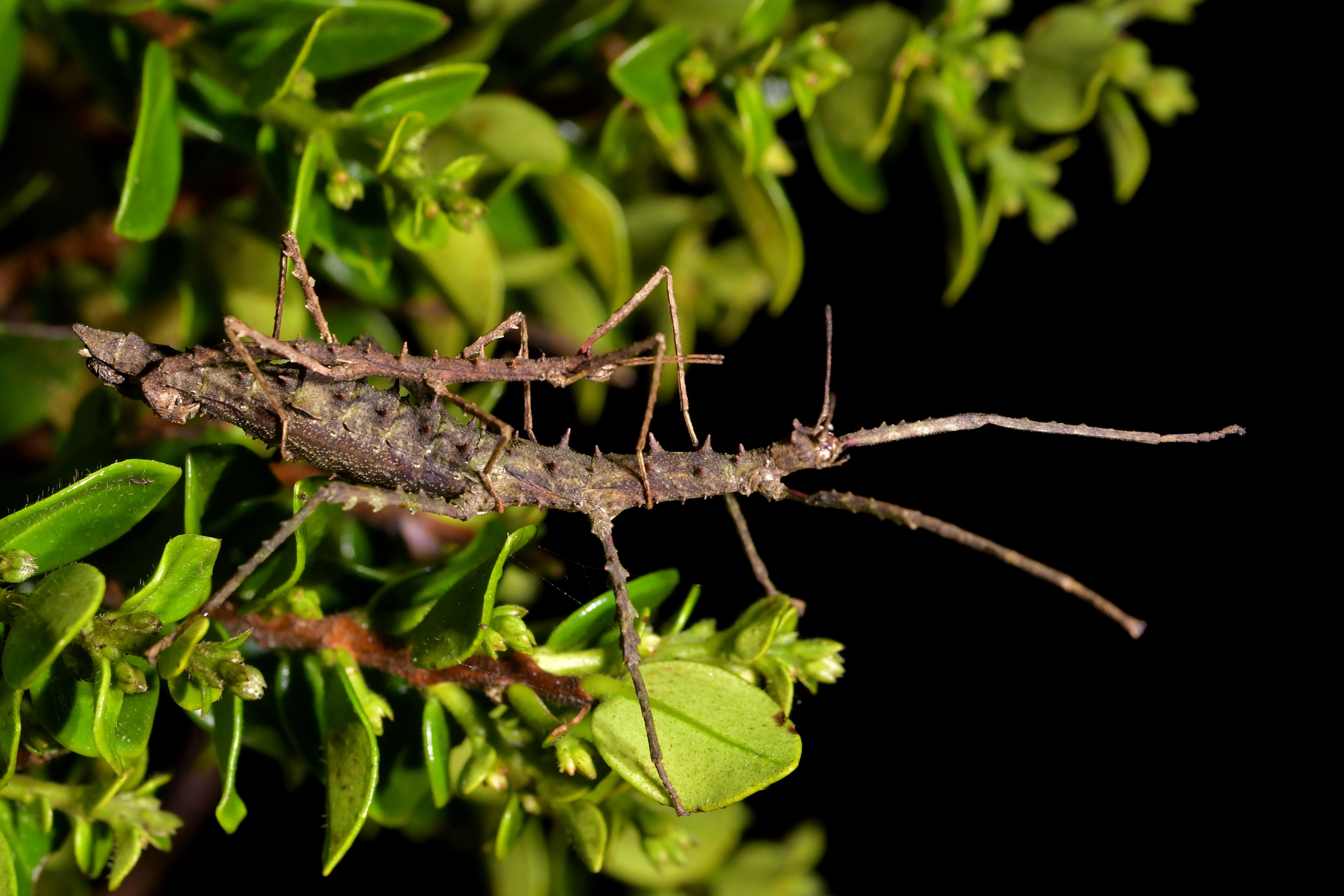
Micrarchus hystriculeus mating

Micrarchus hystriculeus is a plant-feeding stick insect, known to feed on mānuka, ribbonwood and Hoheria. Mating occurs when the male mounts the back of the female and curves his abdomen down and around the female's body, tightly grasping the operculum. This species exhibits prolonged pairing which is thought to function as mate guarding. Males compete in grappling contests where males attempt to dislodge males that are mounted on females. Populations have male-biased sex ratio, with unpaired females rarely observed.

Physiological research indicates that this species can survive low temperatures by supercooling but is not entirely freeze tolerant. Compared to the alpine species, this lowland species has a significantly low (<50%) survival rate when ice is present. This species uses a cold tolerance strategy called freeze avoidance, avoiding the internal formation of ice.

== Taxonomy and phylogeny ==
This species name is derived from the Latin word "hystriculeus," meaning “bristly” or "spiny," referring to the insect's spiny body. First described by Westwood in 1859, this species belongs to the order Phasmatodea and is in the family Phasmatidae. The genus Micrarchus contains several species, including an undescribed taxon from the northern area of the South Island of New Zealand, some of which are restricted to alpine habitats.

Molecular phylogenetic analyses show that New Zealand stick insects, including Micrarchus, form a monophyletic radiation derived from a single colonisation event from New Caledonia. Further studies confirmed that all New Zealand Phasmatidae are closely related to each other and to the New Caledonia species.
