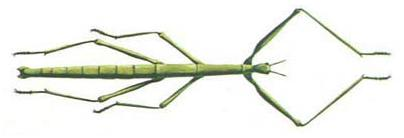
- Bacillus rossius

Scientific classification
- Kingdom: Animalia
- Phylum: Arthropoda
- Class: Insecta
- Order: Phasmatodea
- Family: Bacillidae
- Subfamily: Bacillinae
- Tribe: Bacillini
- Genus: Bacillus; Berthold, 1827

Synonyms
- Bacillus Le Peletier de Saint Fargeau & Serville, 1827; Epibacillus Redtenbacher, 1906

= Bacillus (insect) =

Genus of insects

Bacillus is a stick insect genus, common in Europe and North Africa.

== Species ==
The Phasmida Species File lists:

1. Bacillus atticus – Brunner von Wattenwyl, 1882
2. Bacillus grandii – Nascetti & Bullini, 1982
3. Bacillus lynceorum – Bullini, Nascetti & Bianchi Bullini, 1984
4. Bacillus rossius (Mediterranean Stick Insect) – Rossi, 1788 – type species
5. Bacillus whitei – Nascetti & Bullini, 1981

Note

- Bacillus inermis – (Thunberg, 1815) is nomen dubium
- Bacillus atticus atticus is an endemic species found in Greece and Bacillus rossius is found in Europe.

== See also ==
- List of Phasmatodea of Australia: Bacillus peristhenellus is a synonym of Hyrtacus caurus (Tepper, 1905).
