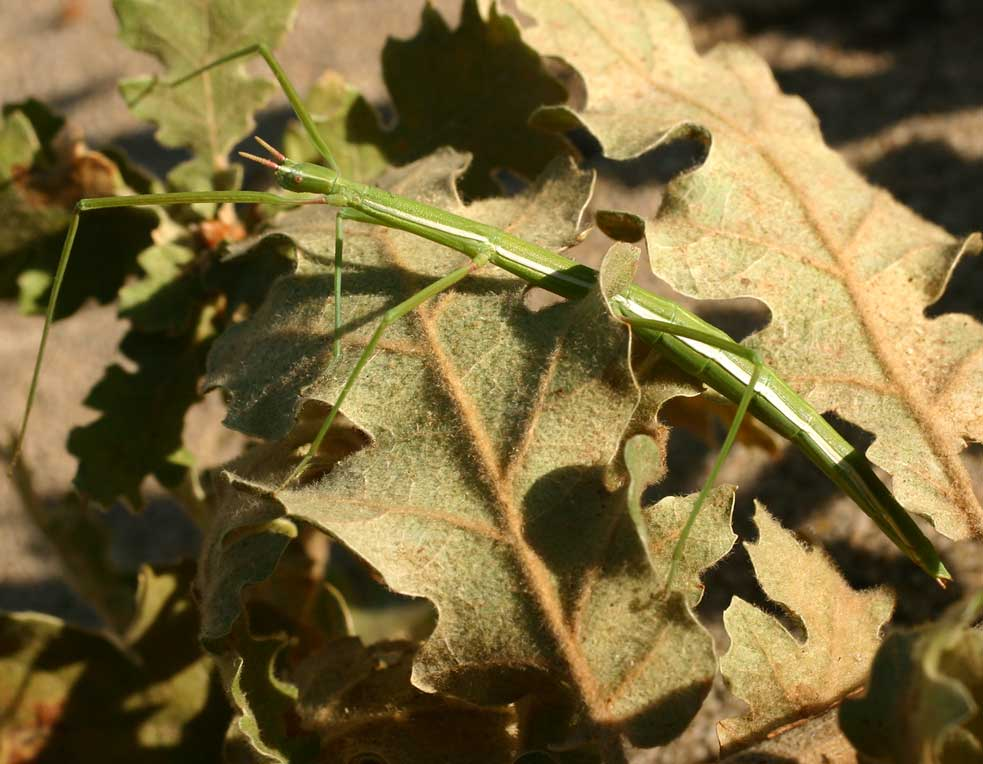
- Clonopsis gallica

Scientific classification
- Kingdom: Animalia
- Phylum: Arthropoda
- Clade: Pancrustacea
- Class: Insecta
- Order: Phasmatodea
- Superfamily: Bacilloidea
- Family: Bacillidae; Brunner von Wattenwyl, 1893

Subfamilies
- Antongiliinae; Bacillinae; Macyniinae

= Bacillidae =

Family of stick insects

Bacillidae is a stick insect family in the order Phasmatodea and the suborder Verophasmatodea.

== Subfamilies and Genera ==
The Phasmida Species File lists:

=== subfamily Antongiliinae ===
Auth. Zompro, 2004; distribution: Africa, Madagascar

tribe Antongiliini Zompro, 2004

- Antongilia Redtenbacher, 1906
- Onogastris Redtenbacher, 1906
- Paronogastris Cliquennois, 2006

tribe Leprodini Cliquennois, 2006

- Leprodes Redtenbacher, 1906
- Pseudonogastris Cliquennois, 2006
- Virgasia Cliquennois, 2006

tribe Pseudodatamini Zompro, 2004

- Cirsia Redtenbacher, 1906
- Paracirsia Cliquennois, 2006
- Pseudodatames Redtenbacher, 1906

tribe Tuberculatocharacini Zompro, 2005

- Tuberculatocharax Zompro, 2005

tribe Xylicini Günther, 1953

- Bathycharax Kirby, 1896
- Ocnobius Redtenbacher, 1906
- Ulugurucharax Zompro, 2005
- Xylica Karsch, 1898
- Xylobacillus Uvarov, 1940

=== subfamily Bacillinae ===
Auth. Brunner von Wattenwyl, 1893. Mediterranean. Africa. Europe. Madagascar.

tribe Bacillini Brunner von Wattenwyl, 1893.

- Bacillus Peletier de Saint Fargeau & Serville, 1827
- Clonopsis Pantel, 1915

tribe Phalcini Zompro, 2004.

- Phalces Stål, 1875

subfamily Macyniinae

Auth. Zompro, 2004; endemic to Cape Province

- Macynia (insect) Stål, 1875
