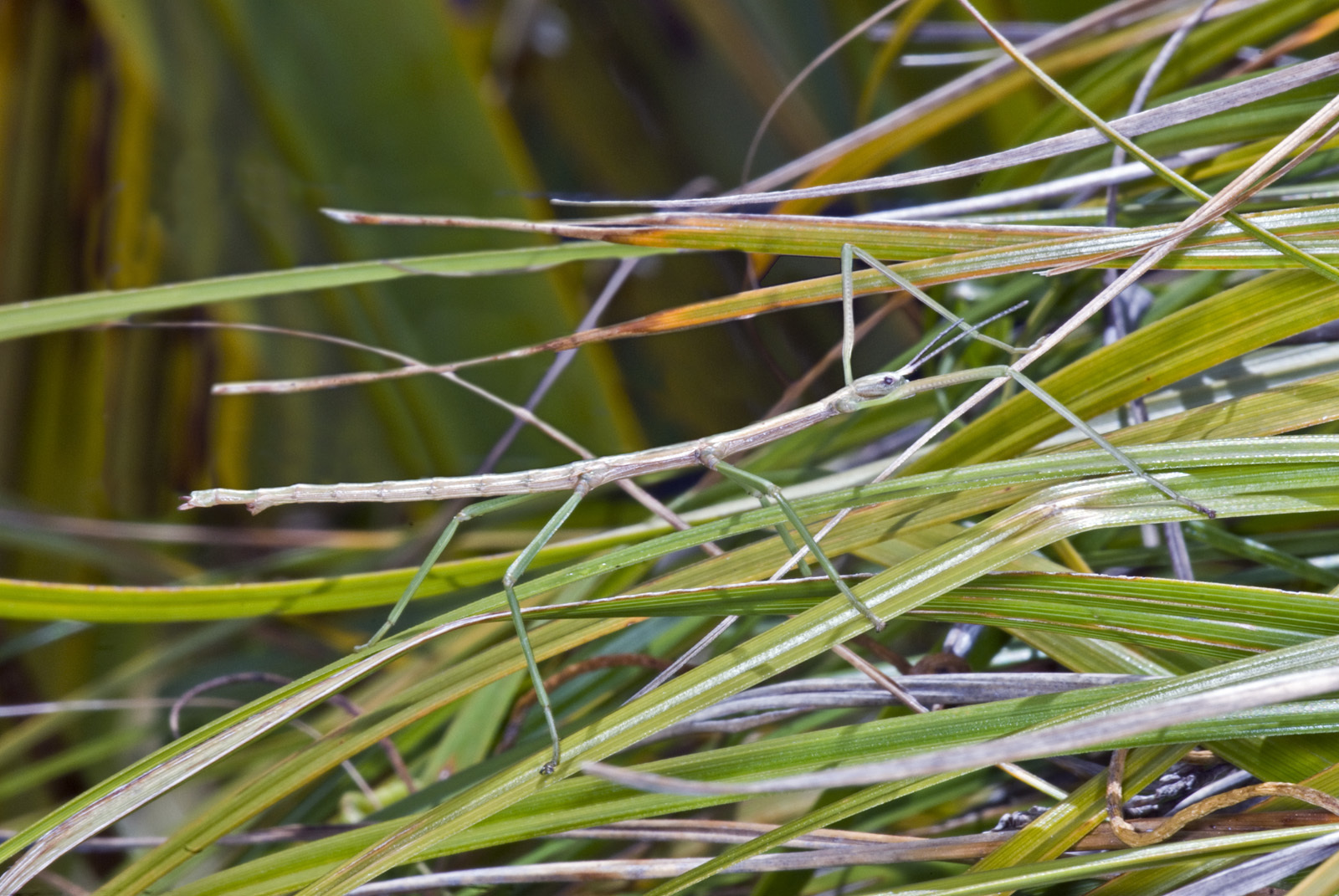

Scientific classification
- Kingdom: Animalia
- Phylum: Arthropoda
- Class: Insecta
- Order: Phasmatodea
- Family: Phasmatidae
- Genus: Clitarchus
- Species: C. tepaki

Binomial name
- Clitarchus tepaki Buckley, Myers and Bradler, 2014

= Clitarchus tepaki =

Species of stick insect

Clitarchus tepaki is a stick insect that belongs to the common New Zealand genus Clitarchus. It is endemic to the North Cape area of New Zealand, in particular Te Paki and the Karikari Peninsula.

== Description ==
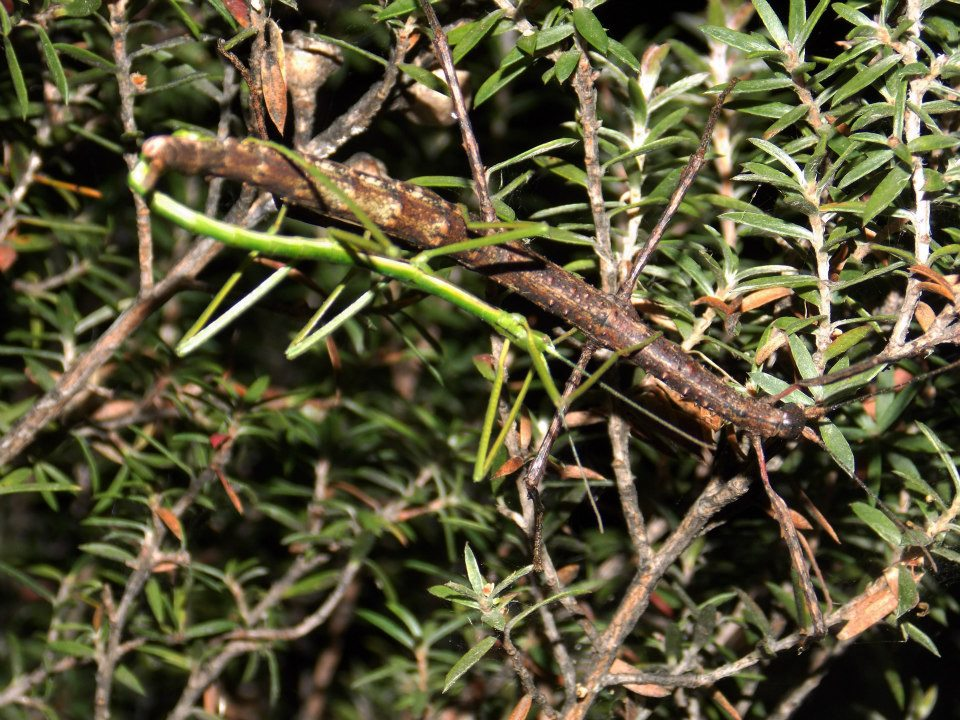
Male and female Clitarchus tepaki at Spirits Bay, Northland

Clitarchus tepaki is a medium-sized, moderately robust and wingless stick insect with a green to mottled brown and grey body, sometimes with tubercles on its dorsal side. It prefers to live in forest remnants, and has been seen feeding on Metrosideros perforata, Metrosideros bartlettii, mānuka (Leptospermum scoparium), kānuka (Kunzea spp.), and pohuehue (Muehlenbeckia australis).

This stick insect has been found in just two localities: the Te Paki or North Cape area, and the volcanic uplands of Paraawanui in the Karikari Peninsula. Within Te Paki it has been collected in many spots, including Spirits Bay, Tom Bowling Bay, and Unuwhao. Both these areas were isolated from the rest of New Zealand during the Pliocene, and are home to several endemic species. Outside these areas C. tepaki is replaced by the species Clitarchus hookeri. C. tepaki was described and formally named by Buckley, Myers, and Bradler in 2014. Its species name, "tepaki", refers to its type locality, which is known to be a centre of endemism for many species of plants and invertebrates, such as Leucopogon xerampelinus, Placostylus ambagiosus, and the stick insect Tepakiphasma ngatikuri. Its name in Māori is whē o Ngāti Kurī, chosen by the Ngāti Kurī people of Northland, whose area of interest includes North Cape.

== See also ==
• List of stick insects of New Zealand
