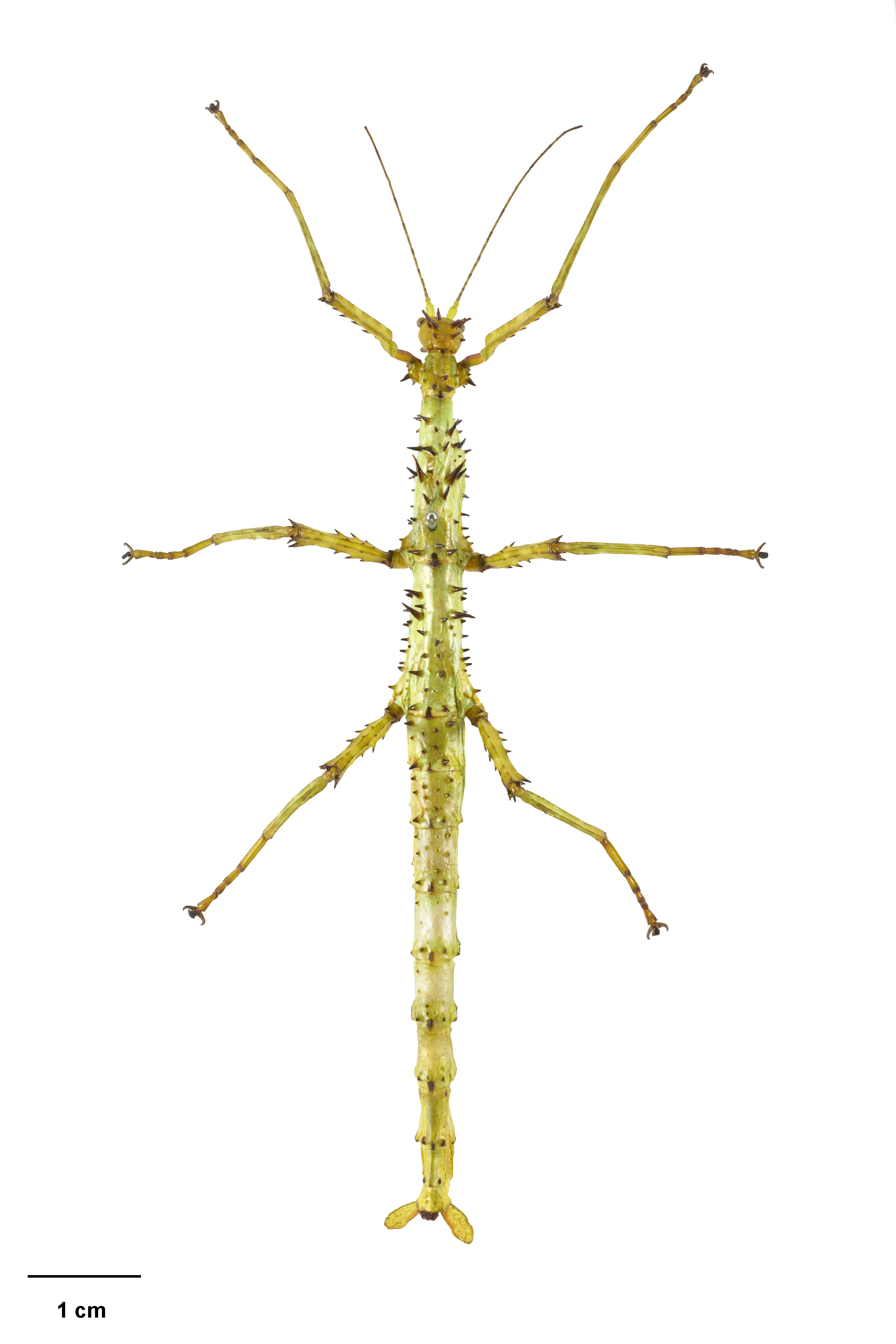
- Acanthoxyla huttoni

Scientific classification
- Domain: Eukaryota
- Kingdom: Animalia
- Phylum: Arthropoda
- Class: Insecta
- Order: Phasmatodea
- Family: Phasmatidae
- Subfamily: Phasmatinae
- Tribe: Acanthoxylini; Bradley & Galil, 1977

Diversity
- 5 genera

Synonyms
- Macracanthiin [sic] Günther, 1953; Macracanthini Günther, 1953 (emendation)

= Acanthoxylini =

Tribe of stick insects

Acanthoxylini is a tribe of Phasmatodeas (stick insects and relatives). They belong to the "typical" stick insects of the superfamily Anareolatae, though they are rather notable among these. For example, the New Zealand giant stick insect (the only species of Argosarchus) is huge, and all Acanthoxyla are females reproducing by parthenogenesis.

== Genera ==
The following genera are currently recognized:

1. Acanthoxyla Uvarov, 1944
2. Argosarchus Hutton
3. Clitarchus Stål, 1875
4. Pseudoclitarchus Salmon, 1991
5. Tepakiphasma Buckley and Bradler, 2010

== See also ==
- List of stick insects of New Zealand
