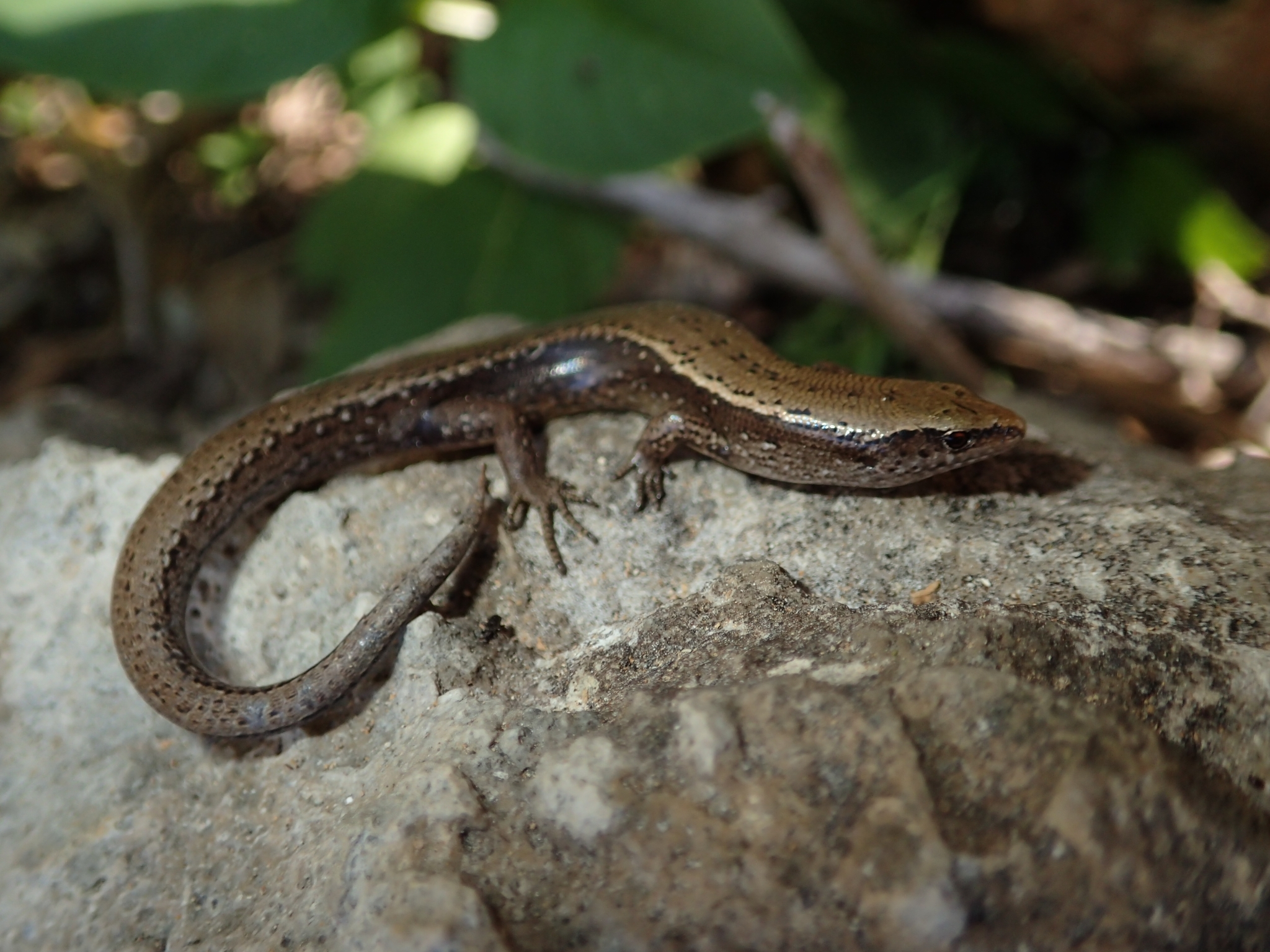

Conservation status
- Vulnerable (IUCN 3.1)

Scientific classification
- Kingdom: Animalia
- Phylum: Chordata
- Class: Reptilia
- Order: Squamata
- Family: Scincidae
- Genus: Oligosoma
- Species: O. hardyi

Binomial name
- Oligosoma hardyi Chapple et al., 2008
- Distribution of Hardy's skink on a map of the North Island Known native range

Synonyms
- Cyclodina aenea Girard, 1857 (part); Cyclodina aenea — Hardy, 1977 (part); Cyclodina hardyi Chapple et al., 2008; Oligosoma hardyi — Chapple et al., 2009

= Hardy's skink =

Species of lizard

Hardy's skink (Oligosoma hardyi) is a species of skink, a lizard in the family Scincidae. The species is endemic to the Poor Knights Islands of New Zealand.

== Etymology ==
The specific name, hardyi, is in honor of Kiwi herpetologist Graham S. Hardy.

== Geographic range ==
In the Poor Knights Islands, O. hardyi occurs on Tawhiti Rahi Island, Aorangi Island, Aorangaia Island, Archway Island, and two rock stacks (Stack “B”, Stack “C”).

== Taxonomy ==
Oligosoma hardyi closely resembles the copper skink, Cyclodina aenea, and was considered to be a member of this species until recently when it was described as a new species using morphological, allozyme and DNA methods (Chapple et al. 2008). More recently, the genus Cyclodina was merged with the genus Oligosoma (Chapple et al. 2009), resulting in a new combination for this species, Oligosoma hardyi.

== Habitat and behaviour ==
Oligosoma hardyi is most commonly found in areas where there is ground cover near flax and scrub habitat. It is crepuscular, seeking refuge during the day under stones or thick vegetation.

== Description ==
Oligosoma hardyi can be distinguished from all other Oligosoma species, including the other members of the O. aeneum species complex, by having suboculars three and four separated by the fifth supralabial under the eye. In addition, the midbody scale count is greater than that of the slight skink (Oligosoma levidensum) from the Te Paki region.

Oligosoma hardyi may attain a snout-to-vent length (SVL) of 5.5 cm (2.2 in).

== Diet ==
Oligosoma hardyi preys upon invertebrates.

== Reproduction ==
Oligosoma hardyi has been described as being viviparous and as being ovoviviparous.
