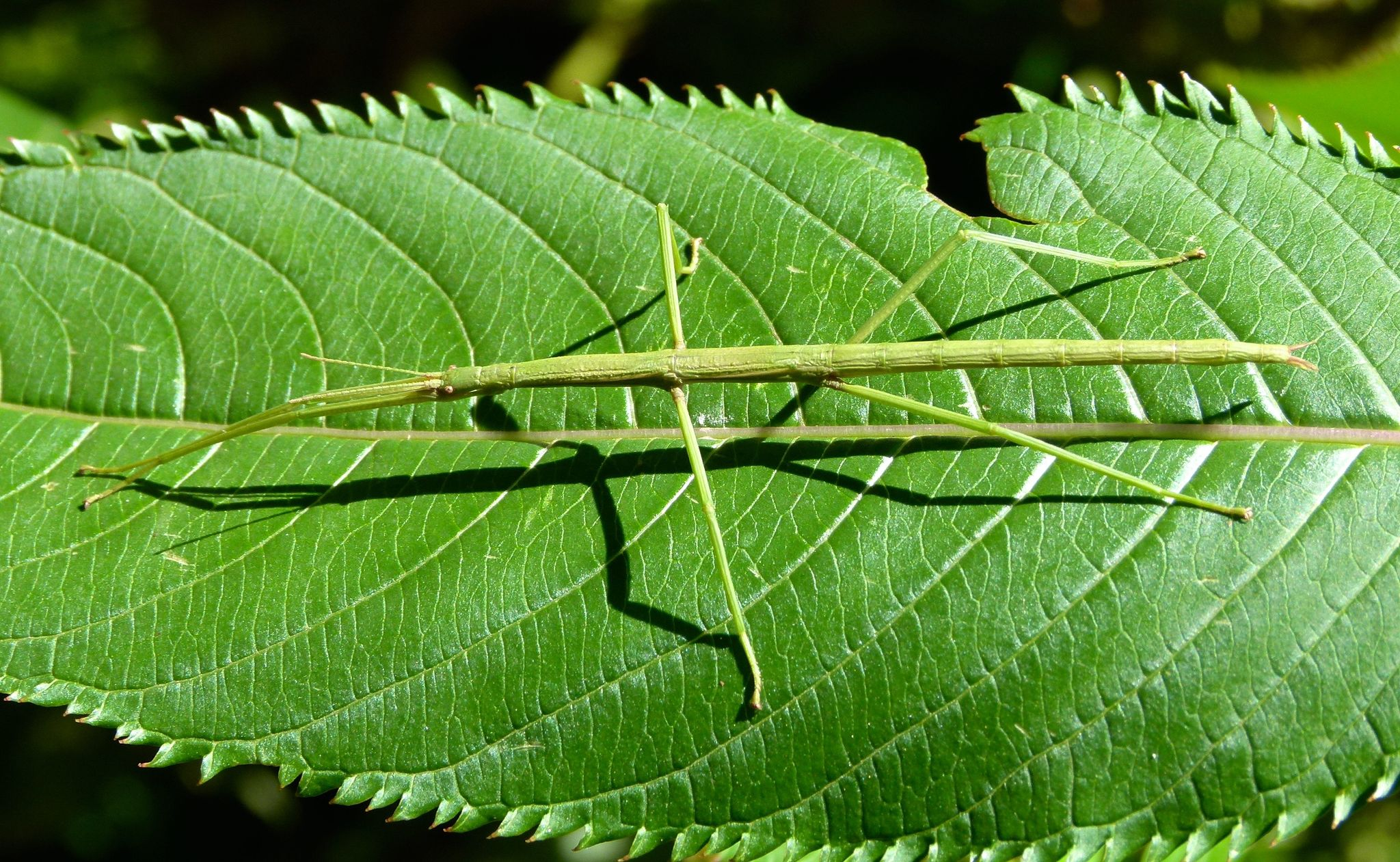

Scientific classification
- Kingdom: Animalia
- Phylum: Arthropoda
- Clade: Pancrustacea
- Class: Insecta
- Order: Phasmatodea
- Family: Phasmatidae
- Genus: Clitarchus
- Species: C. hookeri

Binomial name
- Clitarchus hookeri (White, 1846)

= Clitarchus hookeri =

Species of insect

Clitarchus hookeri, commonly known as the smooth stick insect or the common stick insect, is a stick insect of the family Phasmatidae, endemic to New Zealand. It is possibly New Zealand's most common stick insect. Clitarchus hookeri is often green in appearance, but can also be brown or red. Alongside the prickly stick insect and the Unarmed stick insect, C. hookeri is one of three stick insect species to have become naturalised in Great Britain, with all three having originated in New Zealand.

== Description ==
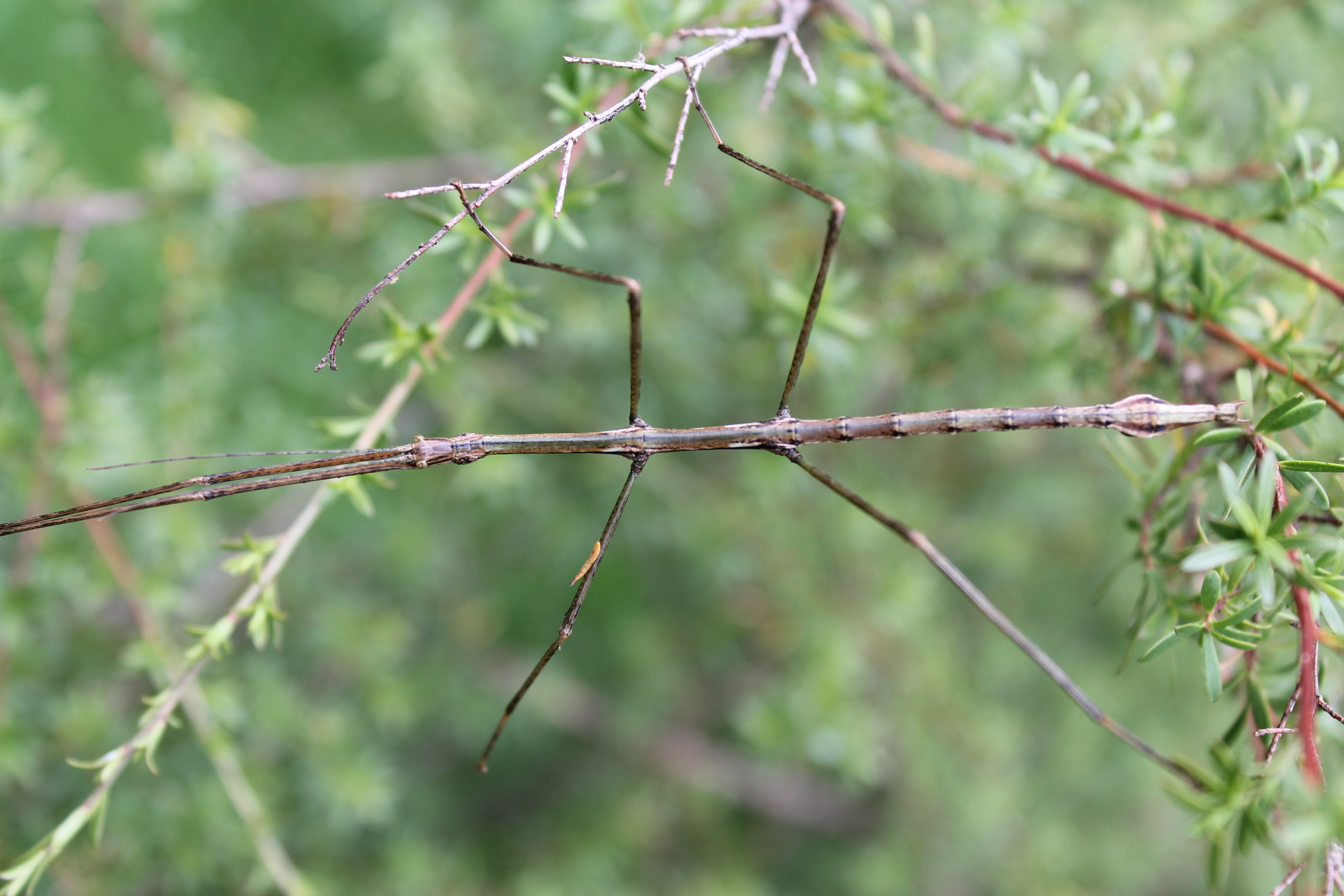
Male Clitarchus hookeri

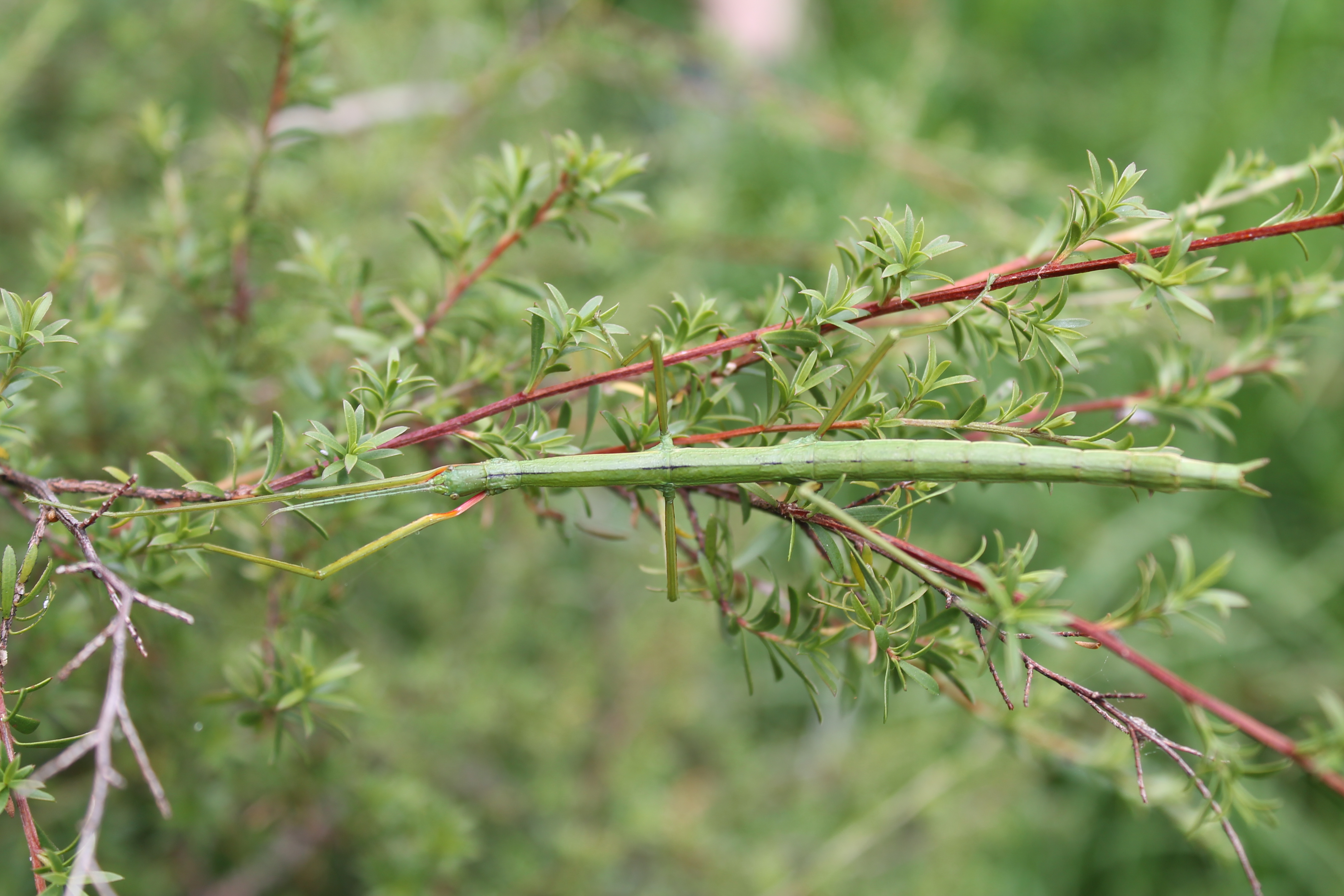
Female Clitarchus hookeri

Clitarchus hookeri is a large stick insect. This species demonstrates sexual dimorphism. Female specimens grow from 81 – 106 mm and males from 67 – 74 mm. The colour can be variable, even in the same location, ranging from bright green to grey, brown or buff. Colour variation is thought to be genetic not environmentally determined. Unlike many tropical stick insects, Clitarchus hookeri is flightless.

== Habitat and distribution ==
Clitarchus hookeri is found from Northland to the Wellington region in the south of the North Island of New Zealand. In the South Island it is not as widespread, being found mainly in eastern coastal areas from Nelson and Marlborough in the north through Canterbury to its southern limit in Dunedin. It is also found in Great Britain, where it has been introduced. The UK population is all-female but came from a sexual population in Taranaki. The species is most commonly found on mānuka, but has also been observed feeding on kānuka, pōhutukawa, Muehlenbeckia australis, roses, white rātā, and Coprosma.

== Life cycle and mating behaviour ==
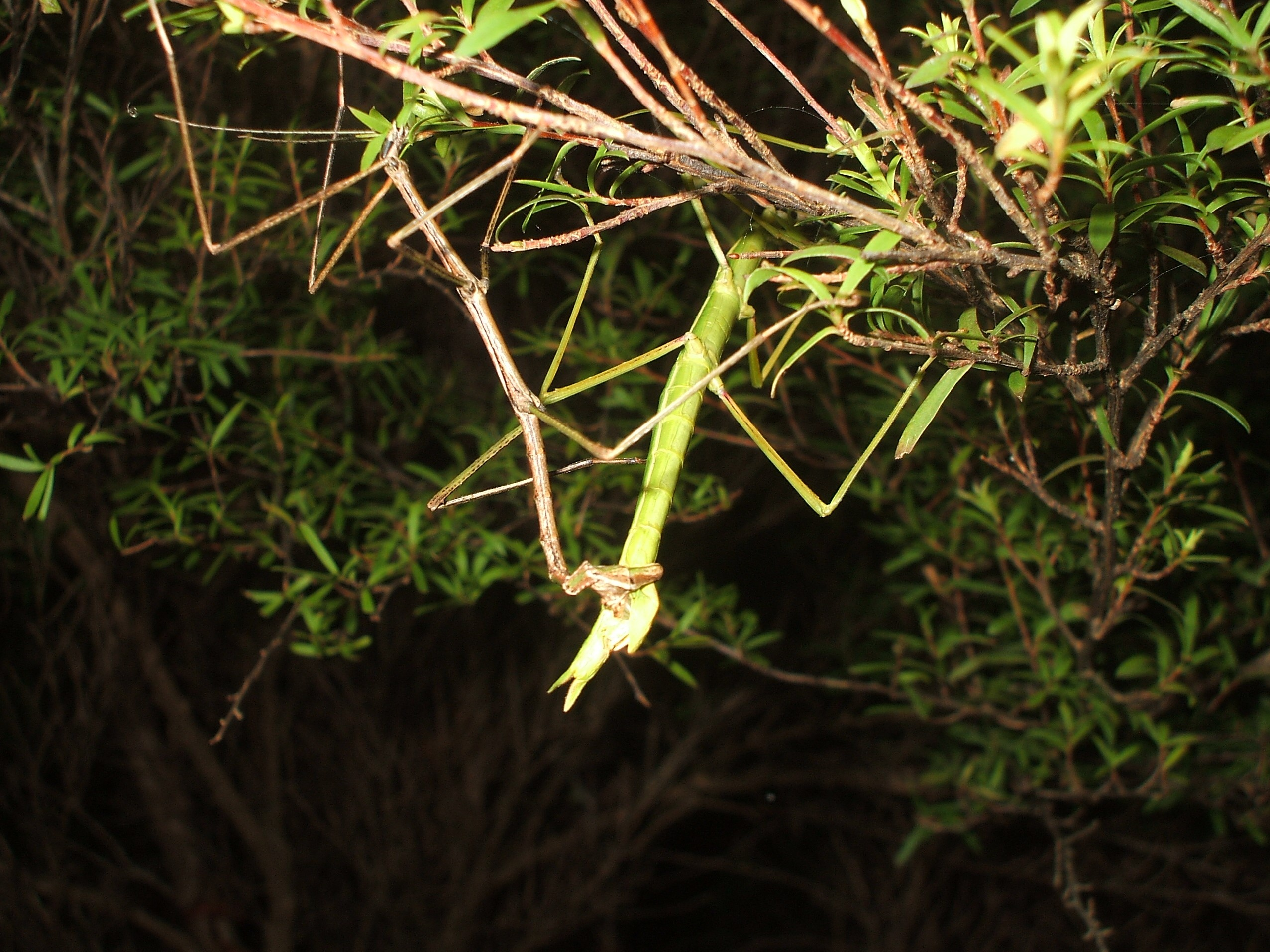
Mating pair of Clitarchus hookeri

Clitarchus hookeri are hemimetabolous, meaning that the nymphs grow through a series of six instars before a final moult into their adult stage.

Adults are found during the summer months and are mostly active at night. During the day they hide among the branches of their host trees, before emerging at sunset to feed and mate. Females hang off the edge of branches feeding on the leaves of their host plant and signalling to males by releasing a mix of volatile chemicals. The long-legged adult males move around at night in search of mates. Males court females by laying his forelegs across her for between 10 minutes to 1 hour, after which he climbs onto the female and attempts to clasp onto her sub genital plate using his genital claspers. If the male successfully attaches to the female, mating begins when the female's operculum opens and the male inserts his genitalia. Males remain attached to the female for extended periods, ranging from one through to 10 nights, during which they may mate multiple times.

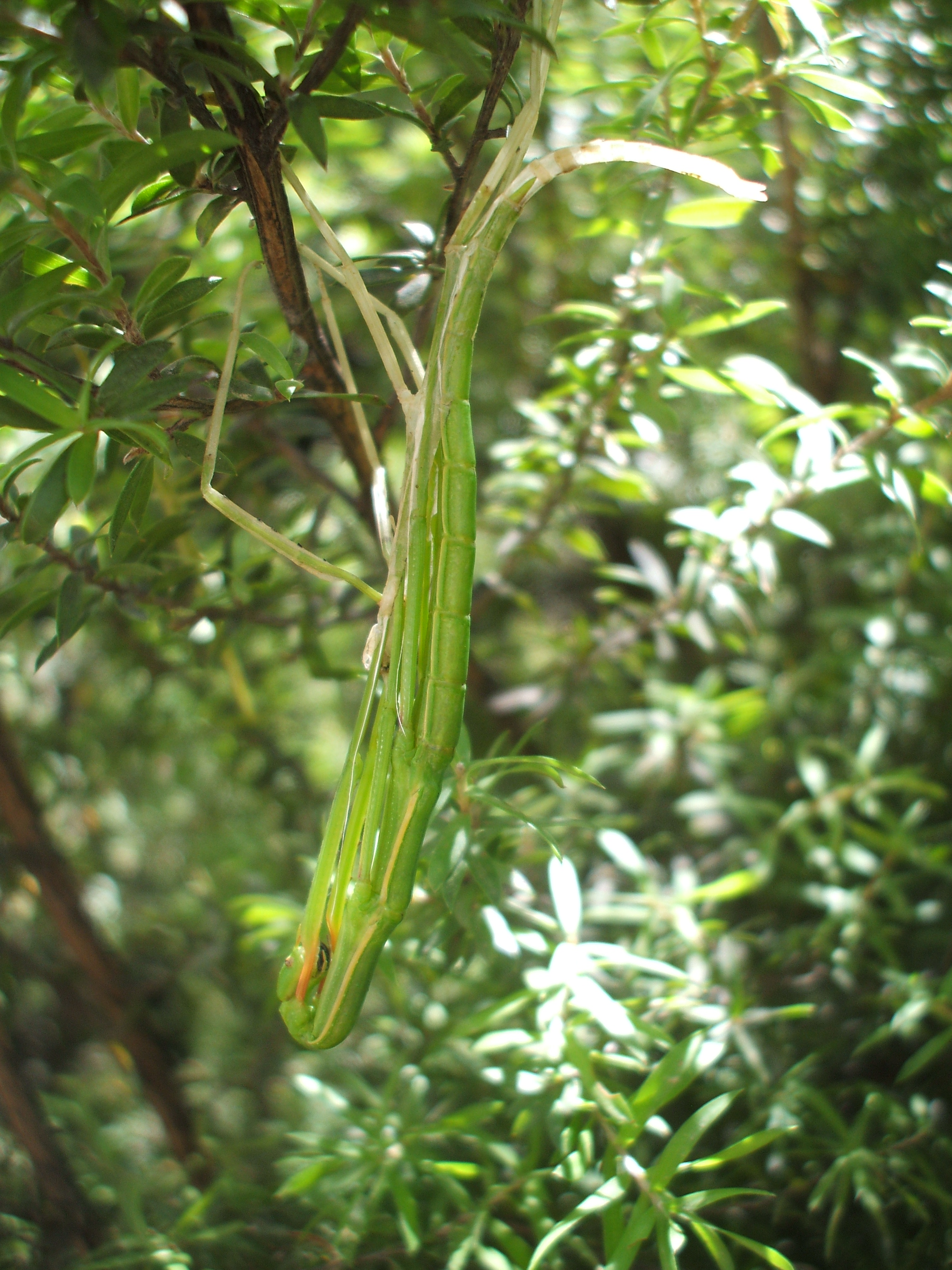
A Clitarchus hookeri moulting

Clitarchus hookeri is geographically parthenogenetic, meaning that in some localities females do not mate to reproduce. Instead, they are able to produce fertile eggs without mating. After mating all eggs are the result of sexual reproduction if the females are from sexual populations. In the South Island Clitarchus hookeri males are rare or absent, while in the North Island both asexual and sexual populations occur. Although females who reproduce asexually lay similar number of eggs and have similar hatching success as those who reproduce sexually, their eggs took longer to hatch. Eggs from parthenogenic females took between 21 and 23 weeks, while eggs from mated females took between 9–16 weeks. Females from parthenogenetic populations show a barrier to fertilization in captivity when provided with mates, however, males cannot distinguish between sexual and parthenogenetic females. However, two wild populations in New Zealand have reverted to sexual reproduction very recently.

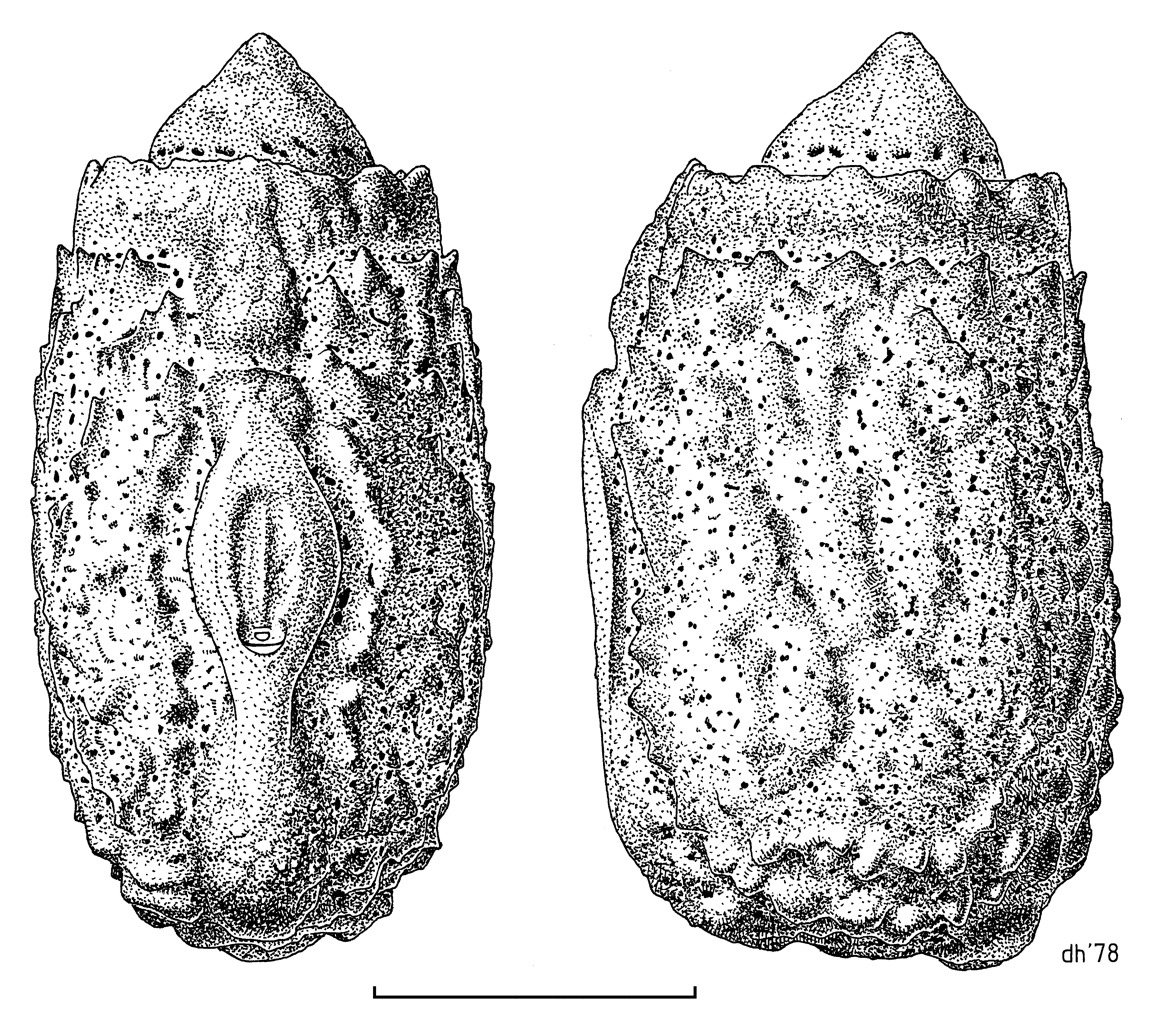
Clitarchus hookeri egg illustration by Des Helmore

== Phylogeography ==
With the exception of the West Coast of the South Island, the current distribution of Clitarchus hookeri is widespread on both the North and South Islands of New Zealand. It is thought that its distribution restricted at the Last Glacial Maximum to refugia in the northern North Island and the east coast of the South Island. It is thought that parthenogenetic female members of the species were able to recolonize areas more favourably following the glacial retreat. South Island individuals and those from the southern region of the North Island form a single clade with very low genetic diversity. Upper North Island individuals are much more diverse genetically. It is thought that the lack of genetic diversity in the lower North Island and South Island population to be due to its younger lineage than their sexually reproducing relatives.

== See also ==
• List of stick insects of New Zealand
