= List of stick insects of New Zealand =

Types of stick insect found in New Zealand

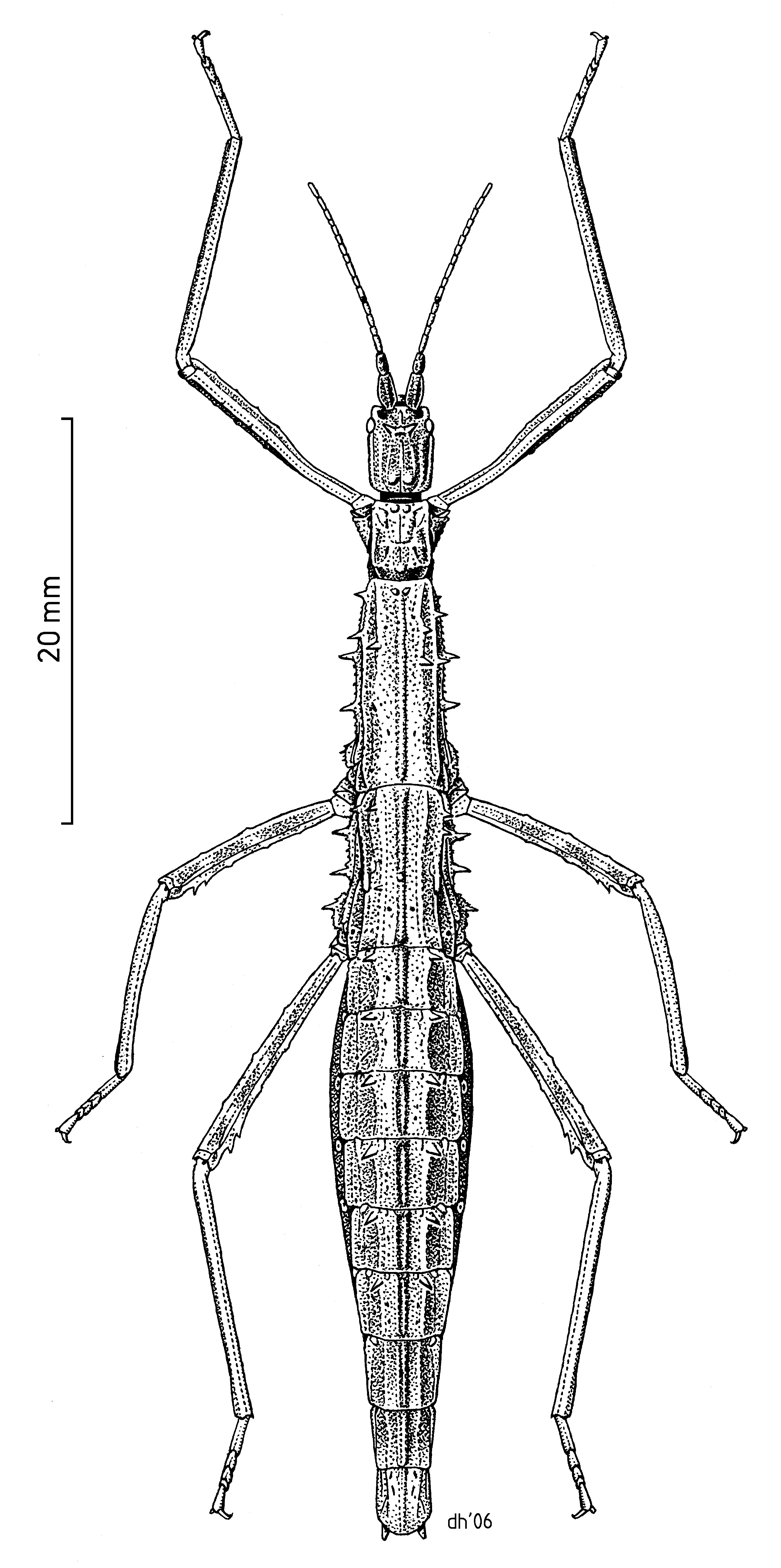
Undescribed Micrarchus species illustrated by Des Helmore

Stick insects in New Zealand are found in a range of different environments, from cold high alpine areas to dry coastal forest. There are between 17 and 23 different species recognised, from 10 genera. The most common species of the stick insect in New Zealand is the smooth stick insect (Clitarchus hookeri) (Salmon 1991). Following Günther (1953), the New Zealand stick insects are placed into the subfamilies Phasmatinae (tribe: Acanthoxylini) and Pachymorphinae (tribe: Pachymorphinini). Classification and identification is based on Jewell & Brock (2002) and 2015.

This is a list of currently recognised stick insects in New Zealand:

== Family Phasmatinae ==
=== Acanthoxyla ===
- Acanthoxyla geisoveii (Kaup 1866)
- Acanthoxyla inermis (Salmon 1955)
- Acanthoxyla prasina (Westwood 1859)

=== Argosarchus ===
- Argosarchus horridus (White 1846)

=== Clitarchus ===
- Clitarchus hookeri (White 1846)
- Clitarchus rakauwhakanekeneke (Buckley, Myers & Bradler 2014)
- Clitarchus tepaki (Buckley, Myers & Bradler 2014)

=== Pseudoclitarchus ===
- Pseudoclitarchus sentus (Salmon, J. T. 1948)

=== Tepakiphasma ===
- Tepakiphasma ngatikuri (Buckley & Bradler 2010)

== Family Pachymorphinae ==
=== Asteliaphasma ===
- Asteliaphasma jucundum (Salmon 1991)
- Asteliaphasma naomi (Salmon 1991)

=== Micrarchus ===
- Micrarchus hystriculeus (Westwood 1859)
- Micrarchus parvulus Carl, 1913

=== Niveaphasma ===
- Niveaphasma annulata (Hutton 1899)

=== Spinotectarchus ===
- Spinotectarchus acornutus (Hutton 1899)

=== Tectarchus ===
- Tectarchus huttoni (Brunner 1907)
- Tectarchus ovobessus (Salmon 1954)
- Tectarchus salebrosus (Hutton 1899)

== See also ==
- Egg (phasmatodea)
