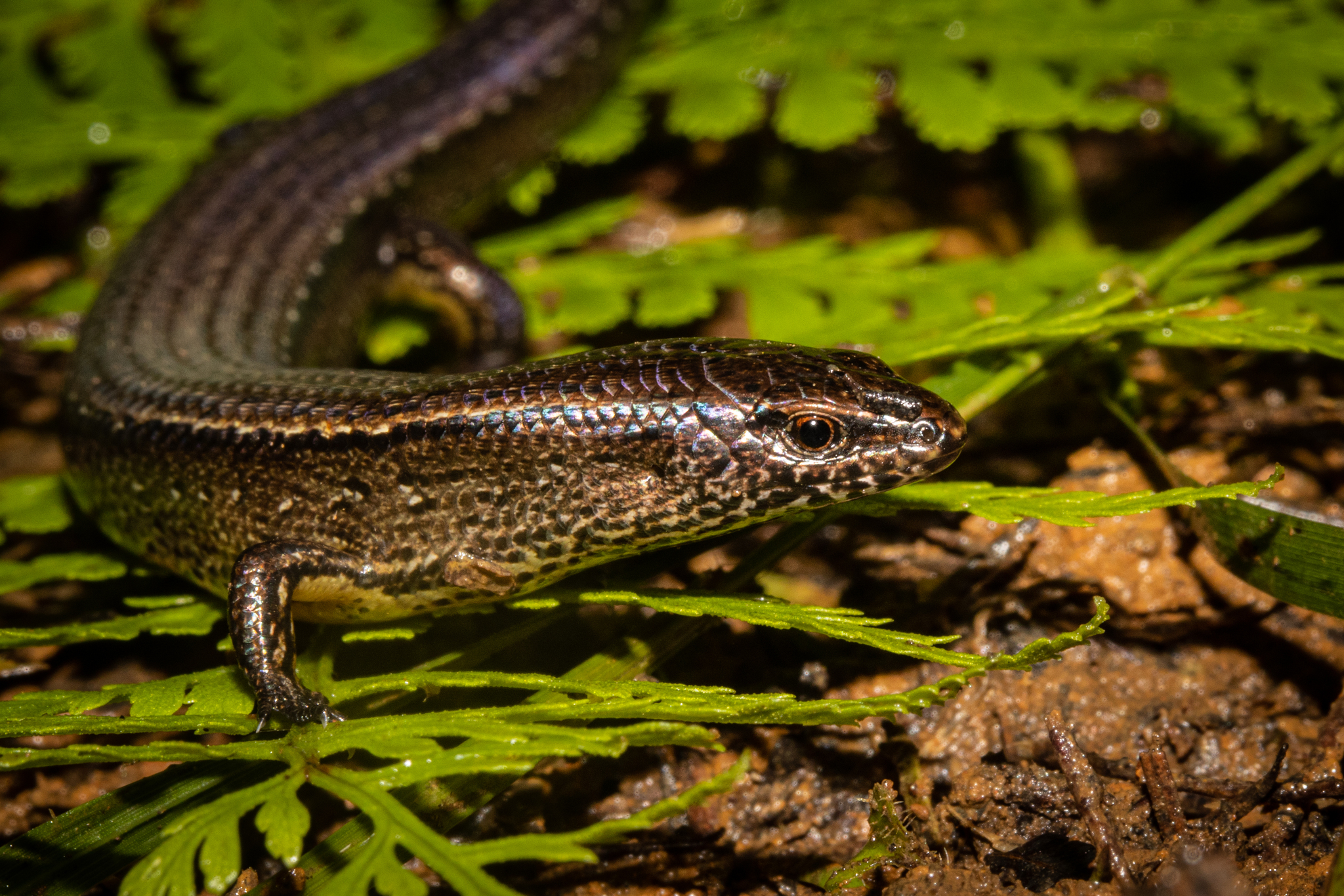

Conservation status
- Endangered (IUCN 3.1)

Scientific classification
- Kingdom: Animalia
- Phylum: Chordata
- Class: Reptilia
- Order: Squamata
- Family: Scincidae
- Genus: Oligosoma
- Species: O. levidensum

Binomial name
- Oligosoma levidensum Chapple et al. 2008
- Distribution of Oligosoma levidensum on a map of the North Island Known native range

= Slight skink =

Species of lizard

The slight skink (Oligosoma levidensum) is a skink of the family Scincidae, endemic to the far north of the North Island of New Zealand. The precise distribution is unknown; currently it is only known from localities in the Te Paki region of Northland. It closely resembles the copper skink, Oligosoma aeneum, and was considered to be a member of this species until recently when it was described as a new species using morphological, allozyme and DNA methods (Chapple et al. 2008). O. levidensum is difficult to distinguish morphologically from O. aeneum, which is probably why it had not been recognised until recently. The main distinguishing feature is the slighter overall body form of O. levidensum compared to O. aeneum. The limbs of O. levidensum are reduced compared to O. aeneum and O. hardyi, the other members of the O. aeneum complex.

== Conservation status ==
As of 2012 the Department of Conservation (DOC) classified the slight skink as Nationally Vulnerable under the New Zealand Threat Classification System.
