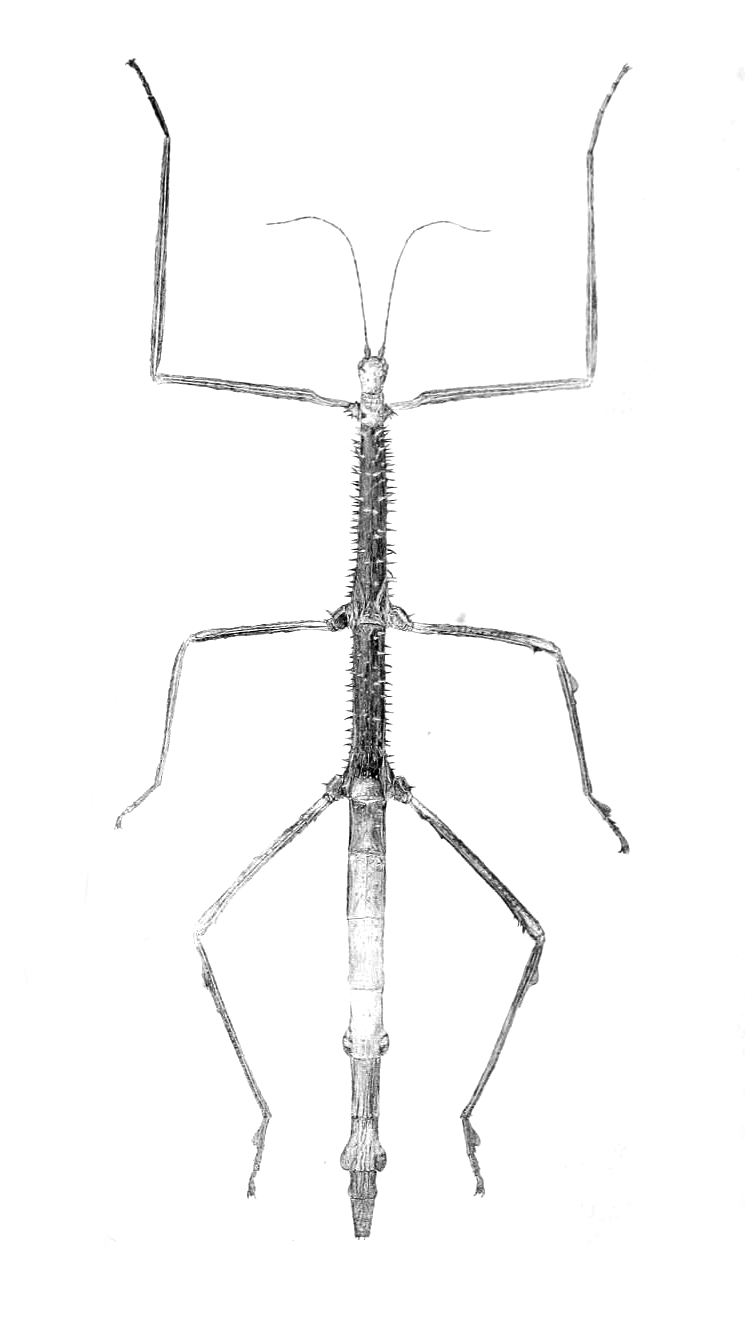
- Argosarchus horridus by William Wing

Scientific classification
- Kingdom: Animalia
- Phylum: Arthropoda
- Clade: Pancrustacea
- Class: Insecta
- Order: Phasmatodea
- Family: Phasmatidae
- Subfamily: Phasmatinae
- Tribe: Acanthoxylini
- Genus: Argosarchus; Hutton, 1898
- Species: A. horridus

Binomial name
- Argosarchus horridus (White, 1846)

Synonyms
- Bacillus gerhardii Kaup, 1866; Argosarchus schauinslandi Brunner von Wattenwyl, 1907; Argosarchus spiniger (White, 1846); Phasma spiniger White, 1846; Bacillus sylvaticus Colenso, 1882; Mimarchus tarsatus Carl, 1913

= Argosarchus =

Genus of insect

Argosarchus is a monotypic genus in the family Phasmatidae containing the single species Argosarchus horridus, or the New Zealand bristly stick insect, a stick insect endemic to New Zealand (Argosarchus spiniger is now considered a junior synonym of A. horridus). The specific epithet horridus means 'bristly' in Latin, likely referring to its spiny thorax.

== Description ==
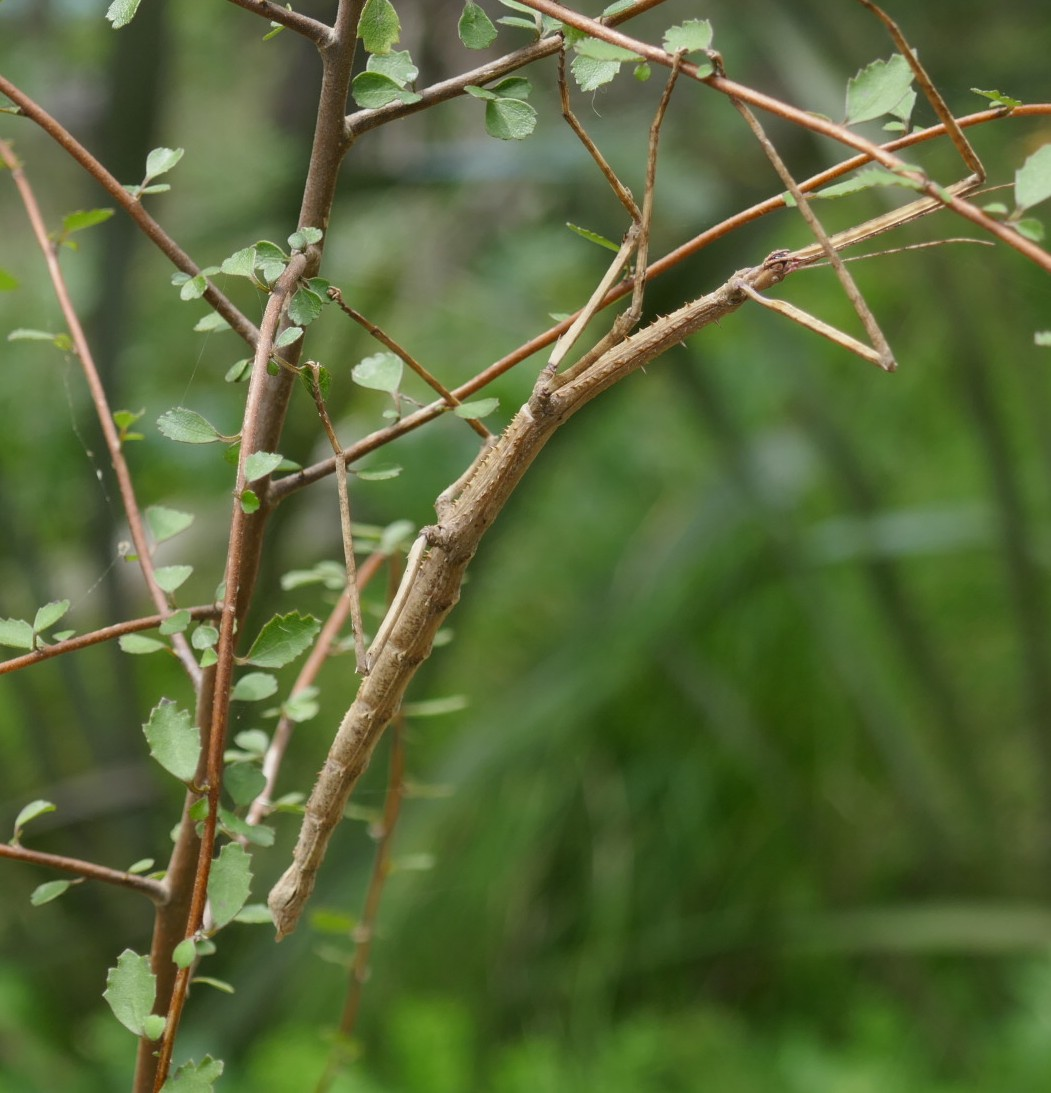
Argosarchus horridus on a juvenile Hoheria angustfolia. Port Hills, Lyttelton

Females can reach up to 20 centimetres (7.9 in) (but are usually 12–15 cm), making this endemic species the longest New Zealand insect. A distinguishing feature is the coxa of the two forelegs is purple or pink. Females are much larger than males and have a visibly spiny thorax. Males are much skinnier and shorter, usually up to 10 centimetres (3.9 in). The colour of A. horridus ranges from pale white to dark brown, with females usually being grey and males being a dark greenish-brown or dark brown. Males have longer spines but less of them.

== Life cycle and mating behaviour ==
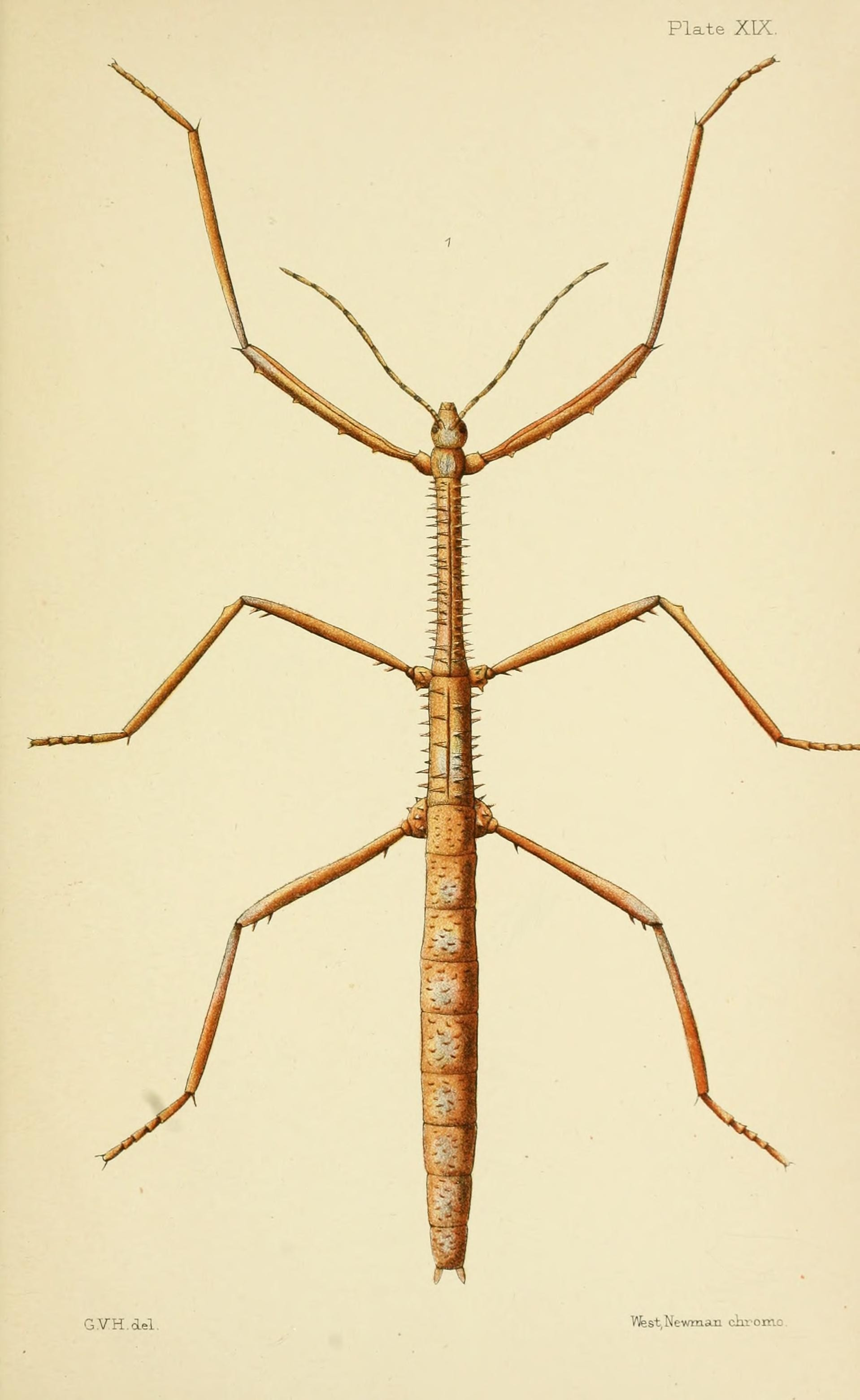
Argosarchus horridus illustrated by George Hudson

Like many other New Zealand stick insects, A. horridus is facultatively parthenogenetic. Because of that, some populations consist of only females who reproduce asexually, while other populations have both males and females and can reproduce by either asexual or sexual reproduction. Adults hatch in early summer and can be seen hanging off their host plant, feeding on it. They are mostly active at night, with males actively searching for females.

Males will mate with females by climbing on to their back, and using the toothed claspers near their genitalia to attach and begin copulation. Males may remain clasped onto a female, even if not mating, in order to mate-guard. Mature females lay eggs continuously throughout their adult life, indiscriminately dropping them to the ground. The large eggs resemble plant seeds, and are well-camouflaged on the forest floor. Eggs hatch in early spring, and nymphs resemble miniature adults. Like other stick insects, A. horridus is hemimetabolous, and nymphs grow by moulting, going through six instars until final adulthood.

Argosarchus horridus eggs illustrated by Des Helmore

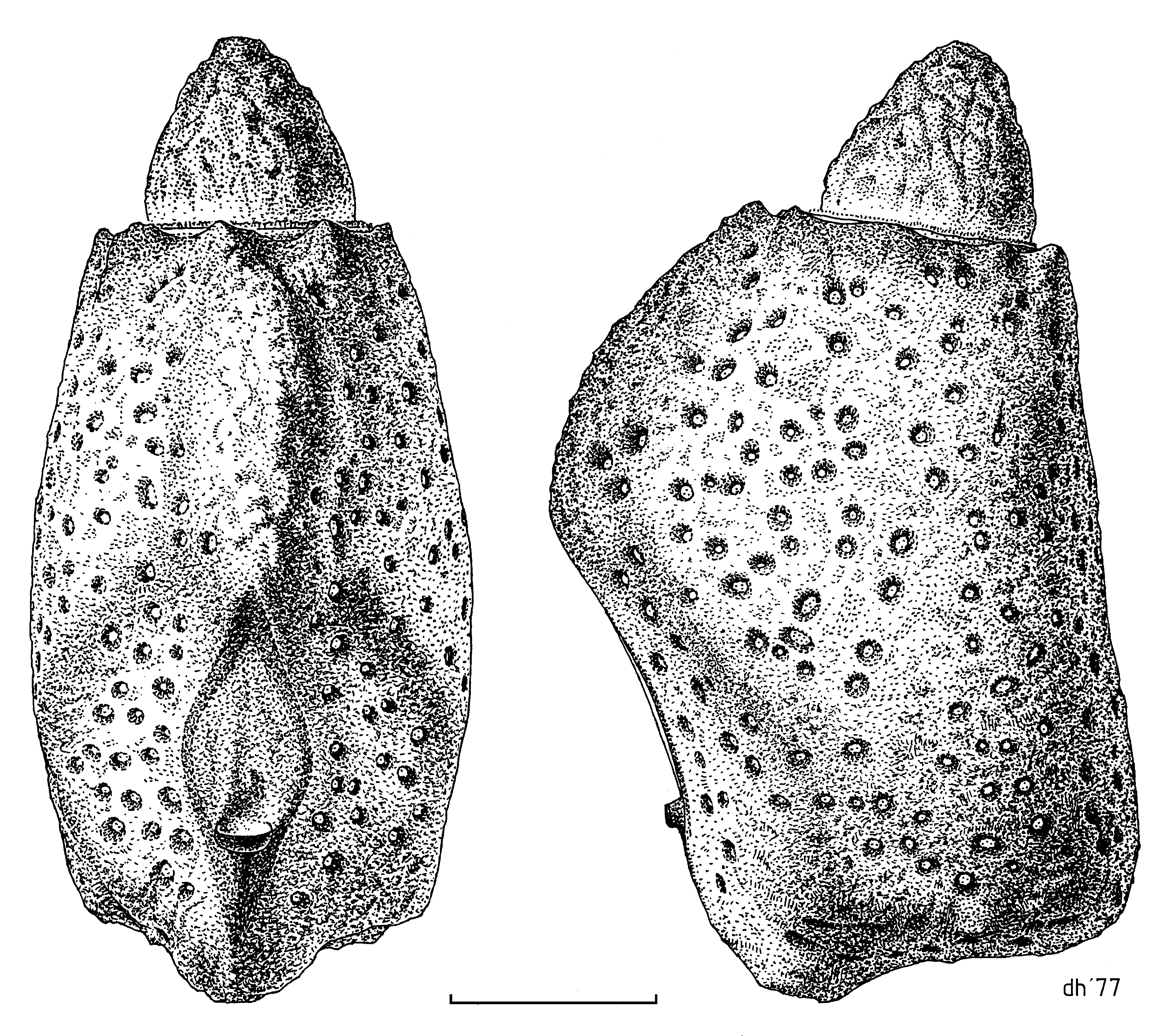

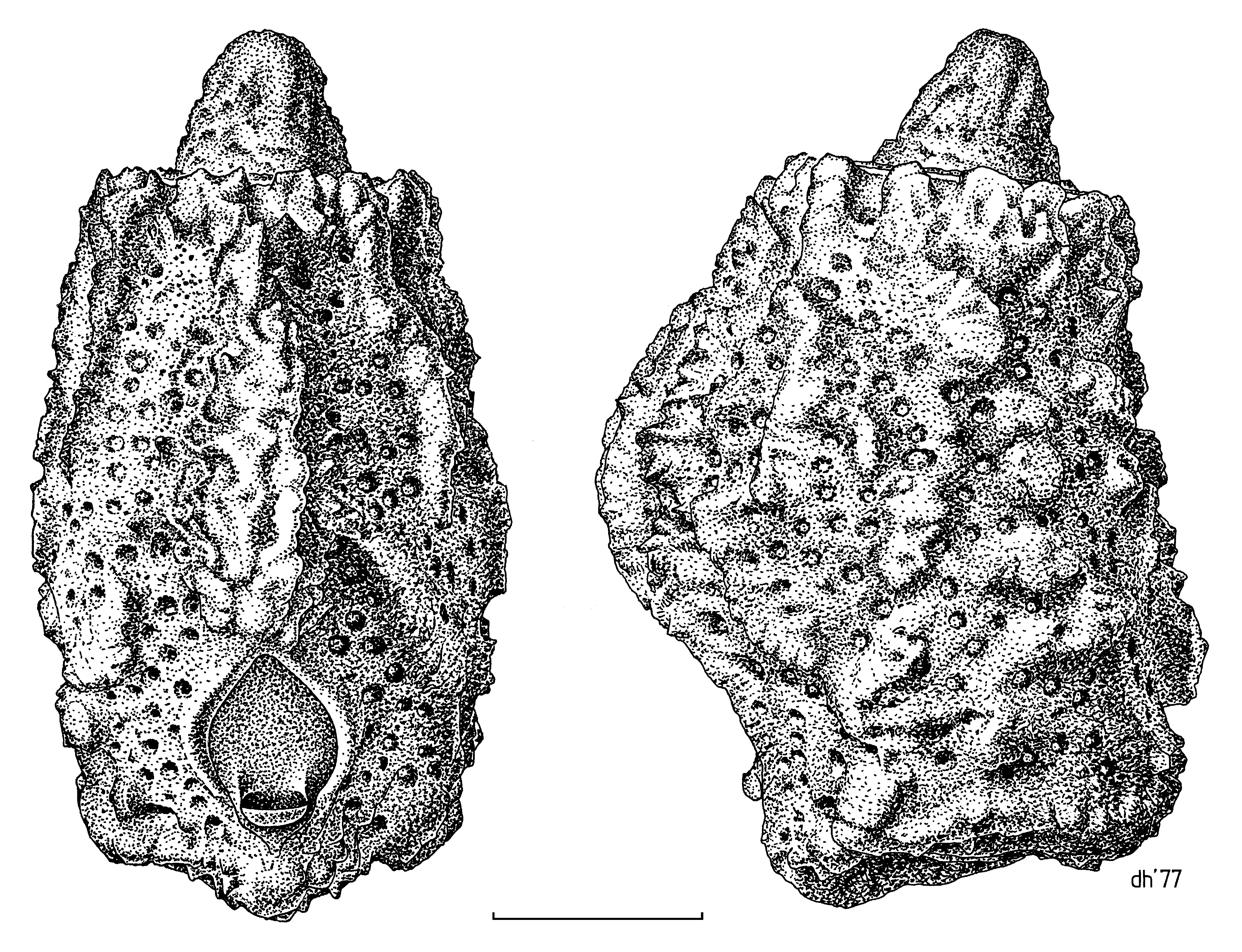

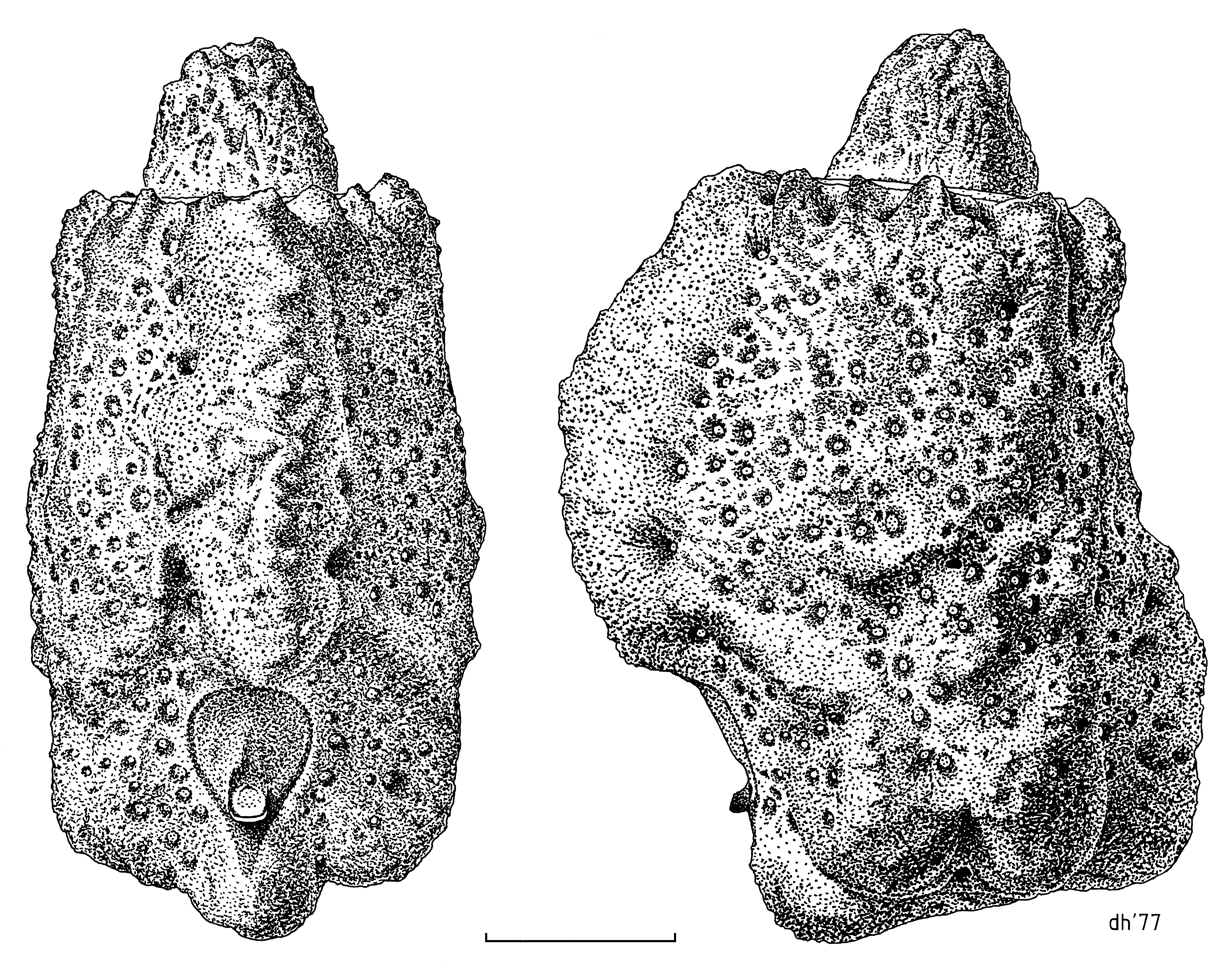

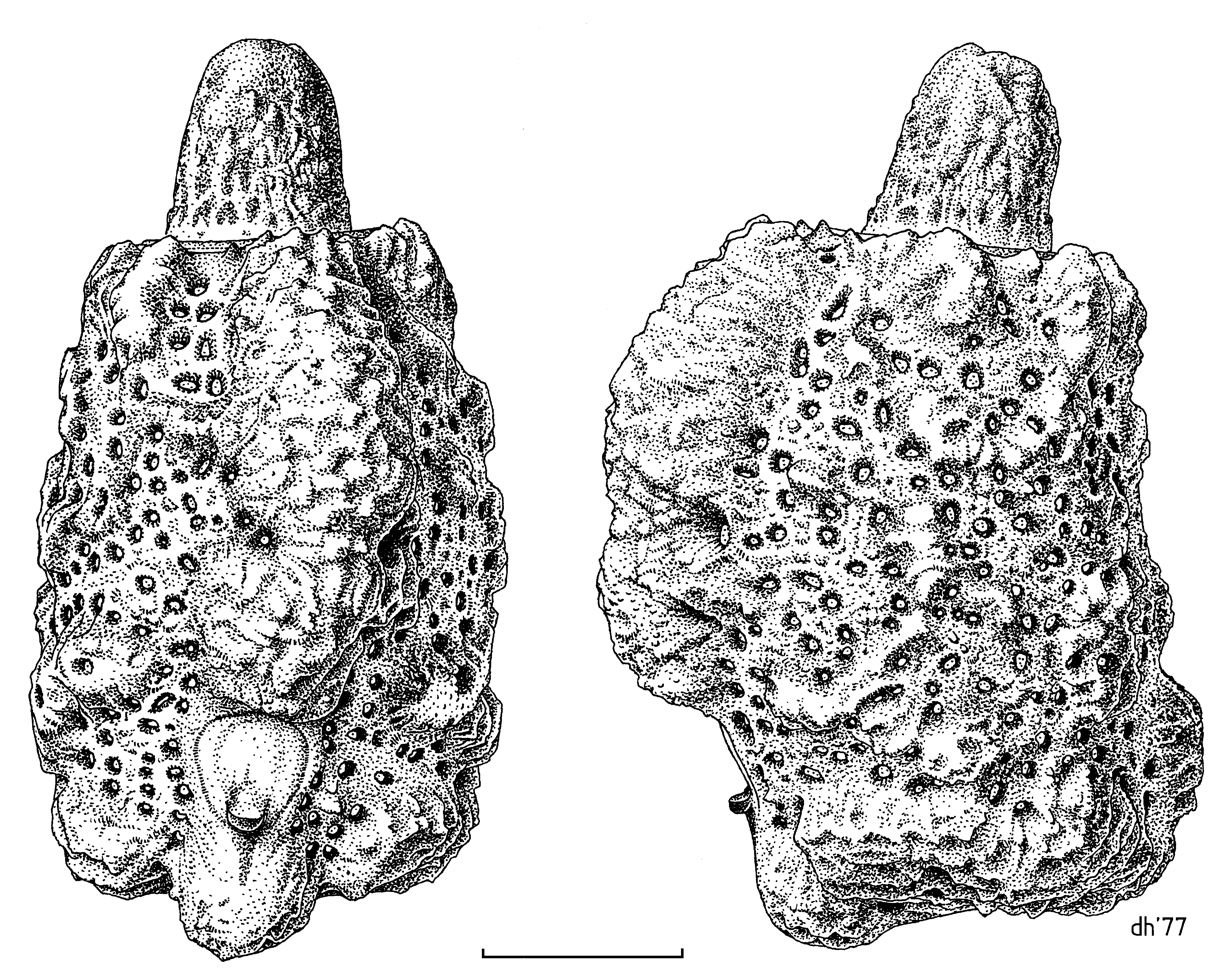

== Habitat and distribution ==
A. horridus is found throughout much of the North Island, as well as some parts of the South Island. It is present in coastal areas from sea level to at least 900 m a.s.l. The species is absent in the central South Island and in high-altitude areas. It has also been found on a number of offshore islands, including the Chatham Islands. On the Chatham Islands only females occur and this population was once considered a different species (A. schauinslandi). It can be found in gardens on ramarama (Lophomyrtus bullata) and in the wild on native and introduced Rubus species (Rosaceae) and climbing rātā (Metrosideros perforata). Because of its wide distribution, range of host plants and the various habitats it is found in, A. horridus is considered an ecological generalist.

== See also ==
- List of stick insects of New Zealand
