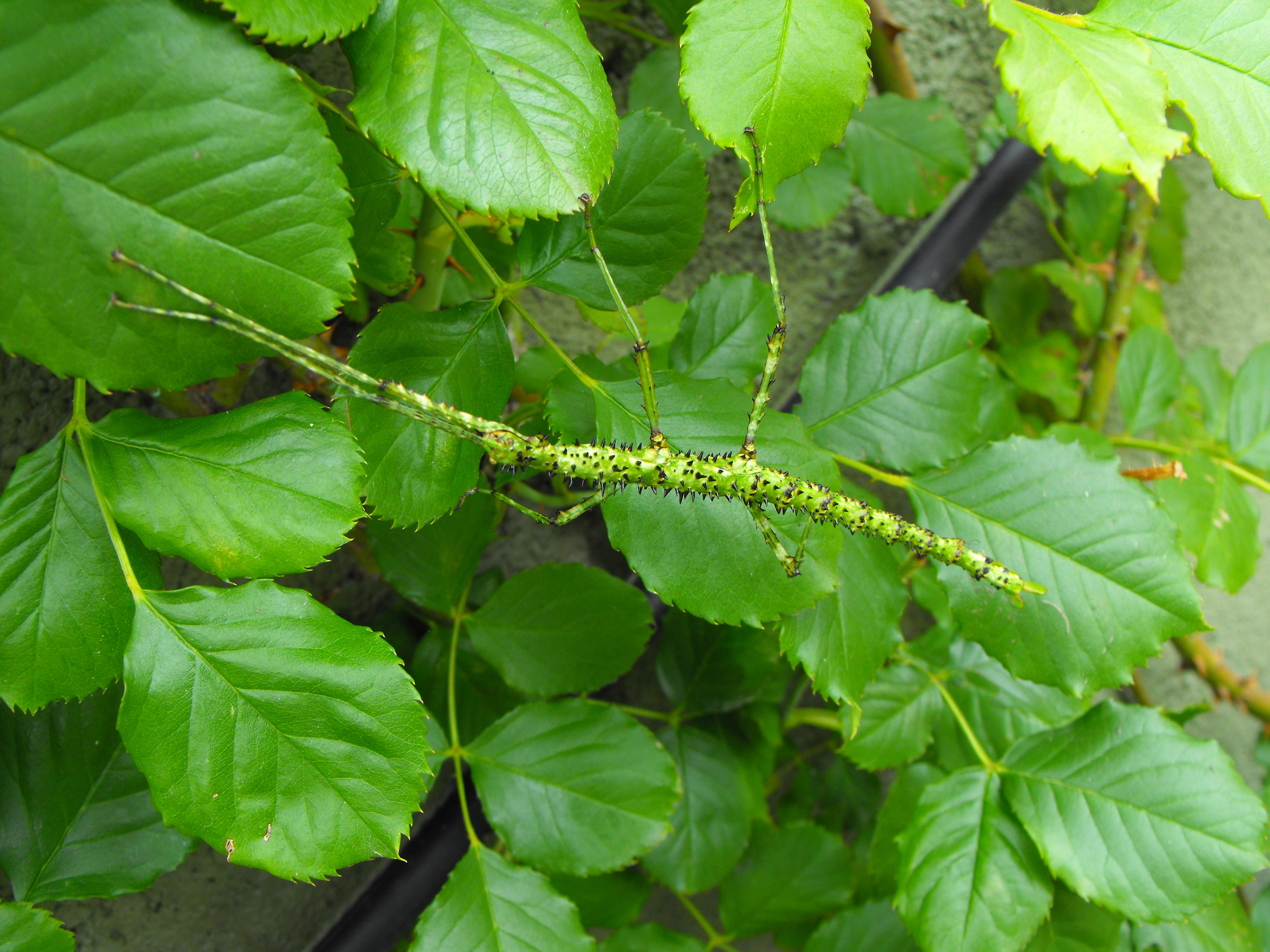
- A prickly green stick insect (Acanthoxyla prasina) seen in Fairfield, Otago in 2012

Scientific classification
- Kingdom: Animalia
- Phylum: Arthropoda
- Class: Insecta
- Order: Phasmatodea
- Family: Phasmatidae
- Subfamily: Phasmatinae
- Genus: Acanthoxyla; Uvarov 1955

= Acanthoxyla =

Genus of stick insects

Acanthoxyla is a genus of stick insects in the family Phasmatidae (tribe Acanthoxylini). All the individuals of the genus are female and reproduce asexually by parthenogenesis. However, a male Acanthoxyla inermis was recently discovered in the UK, probably the result of chromosome loss. The genus is the result of interspecific hybridisation resulting in some triploid lineages and some diploid lineages. The genus is endemic to New Zealand, but some species have been accidentally introduced elsewhere. The genus name Acanthoxyla translates from Greek as prickly stick (acantho = thorn; xyla = wood).

== Species ==
The Catalogue of Life lists:

- Acanthoxyla fasciata (Hutton, 1899)
- Acanthoxyla geisovii (Kaup, 1866)
- Acanthoxyla huttoni Salmon, 1955
- Acanthoxyla inermis Salmon, 1955
- Acanthoxyla intermedia Salmon, 1955
- Acanthoxyla prasina (Westwood, 1859)
- Acanthoxyla speciosa Salmon, 1955
- Acanthoxyla suteri (Hutton, 1899)

== See also ==
- List of stick insects of New Zealand
