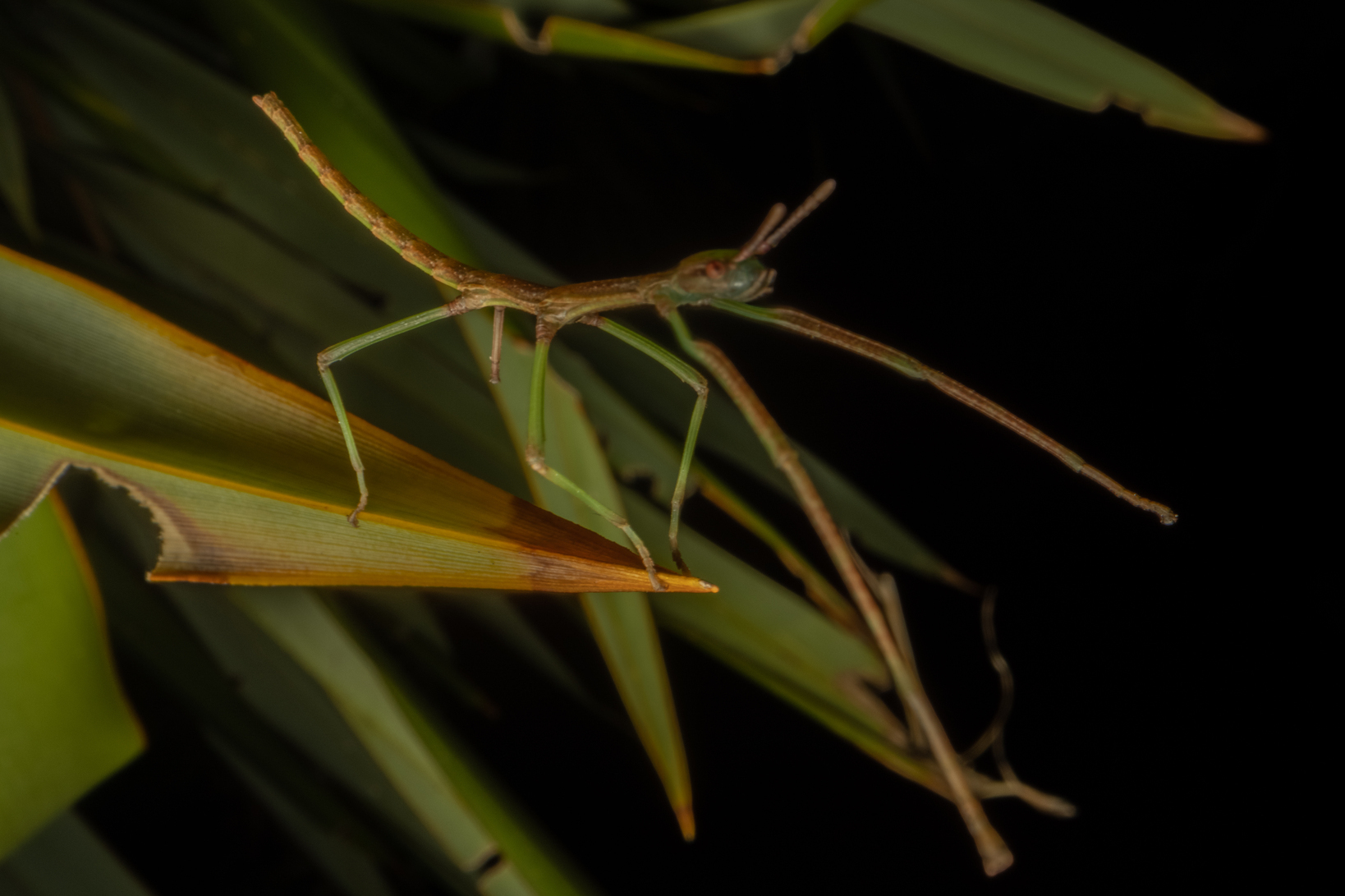

Scientific classification
- Kingdom: Animalia
- Phylum: Arthropoda
- Clade: Pancrustacea
- Class: Insecta
- Order: Phasmatodea
- Family: Phasmatidae
- Genus: Clitarchus
- Species: C. rakauwhakanekeneke

Binomial name
- Clitarchus rakauwhakanekeneke Buckley, Myers and Bradler, 2014

= Clitarchus rakauwhakanekeneke =

Species of stick insect

Clitarchus rakauwhakanekeneke is a stick insect that belongs the common New Zealand genus Clitarchus. It lives only on the Poor Knights Islands.

== Description ==
Clitarchus rakauwhakanekeneke is a medium-sized, moderately robust and wingless stick insect with a green to mottled brown and grey body, with some tubercles and spines more commonly on its dorsal side. It has been collected on Metrosideros perforata, pōhutukawa (Metrosideros excelsa), mānuka (Leptospermum scoparium), kānuka (Kunzea spp.), tall mingimingi (Leucopogon fasciculatus), Coprosma sp., and some grasses.

This stick insect is restricted to the Poor Knights Islands, some 22 kilometres from the eastern coast of Northland. It has been found on two of the main islands, Tawhiti Rahi and Aorangi. The species was first noted by J. C. Watt, who referred to it in 1982 as Clitarchus aff. hookeri, and considered it to be either a "geographic race" or an endemic species. It was described and formally named by Buckley, Myers, and Bradler in 2014.

Its species name, rakauwhakanekeneke, is Māori for "the stick that moves", and was chosen by the Ngāti Wai people of Northland, guardians of the Poor Knights Islands. The survival of the species seems to be assured by the absence of wasp and mammalian predators and the abundance of host plants on the islands.

== See also ==
- List of stick insects of New Zealand
