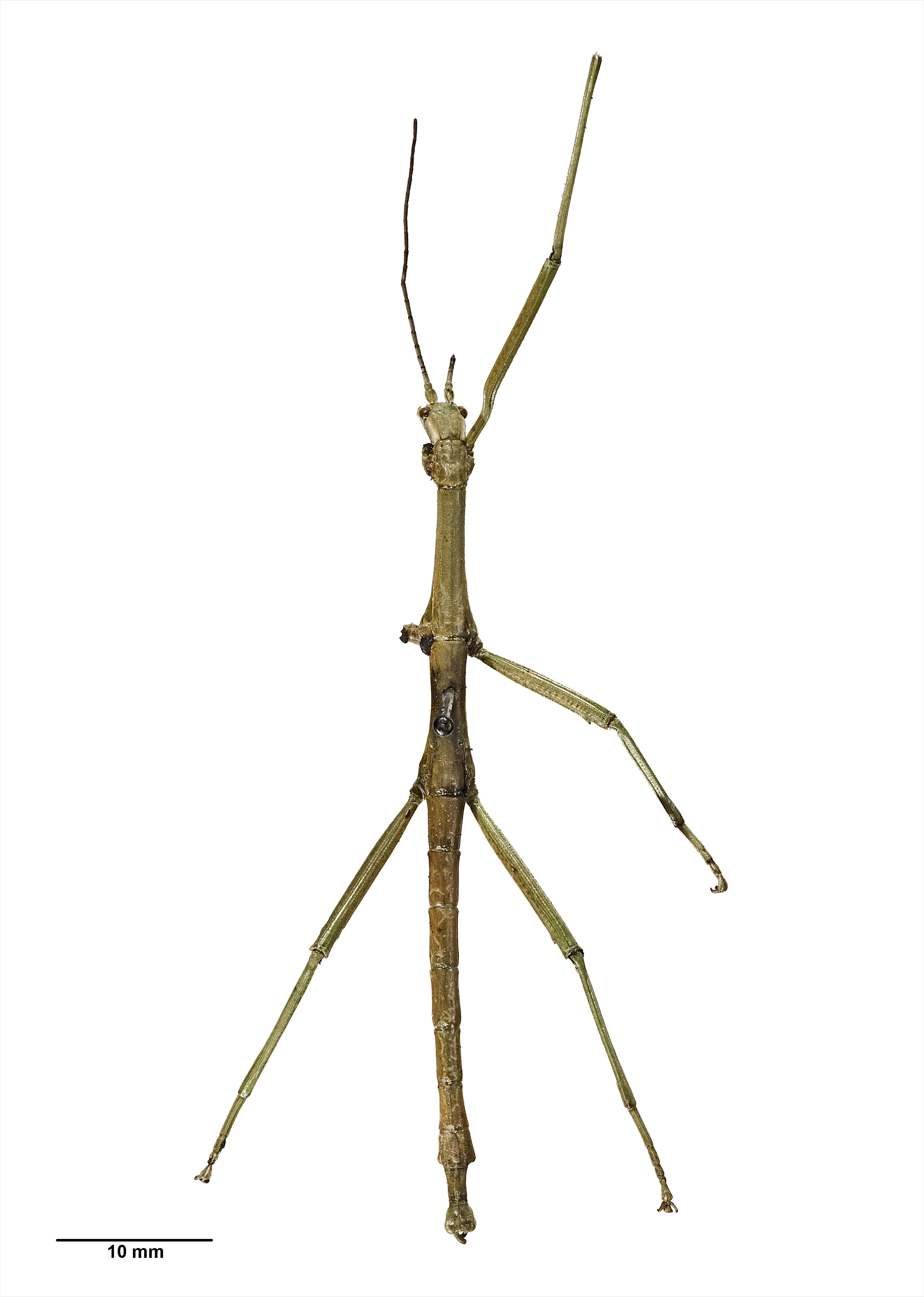
- Pseudoclitarchus sentus (Salmon, 1948), male specimen held at Auckland Museum, licensed under CC BY 4.0
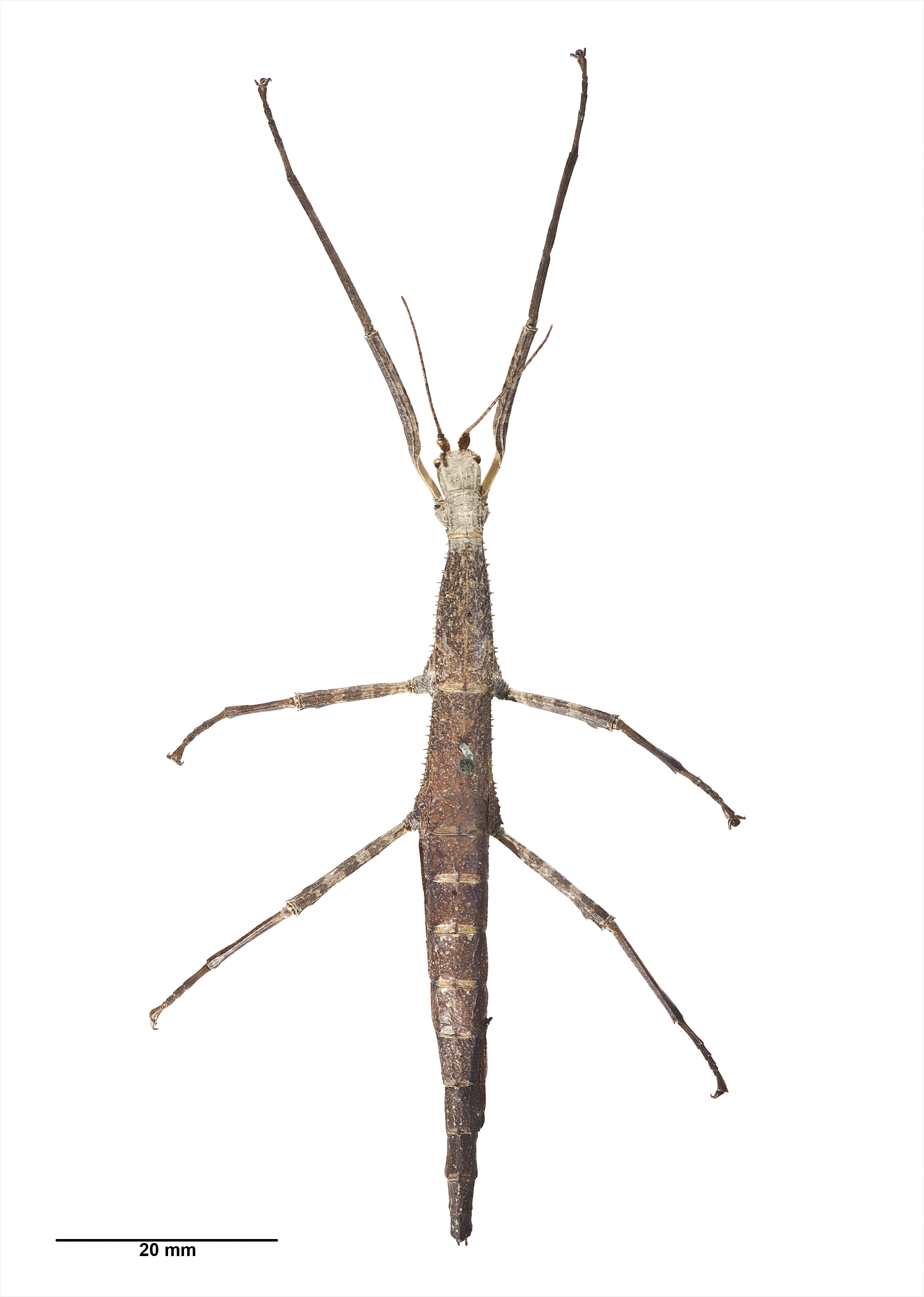
- Pseudoclitarchus sentus (Salmon, 1948), female specimen held at Auckland Museum, licensed under CC BY 4.0

Scientific classification
- Domain: Eukaryota
- Kingdom: Animalia
- Phylum: Arthropoda
- Class: Insecta
- Order: Phasmatodea
- Family: Phasmatidae
- Subfamily: Phasmatinae
- Tribe: Acanthoxylini
- Genus: Pseudoclitarchus; Salmon, 1991
- Species: P. sentus

Binomial name
- Pseudoclitarchus sentus (Salmon, 1948)

Synonyms
- Acanthoxyla senta Salmon, 1948; Pseudoclitarchus senta (Salmon, 1948)

= Pseudoclitarchus =

Genus of stick insects

Pseudoclitarchus sentus is the sole representative of the genus Pseudoclitarchus, and is a stick insect endemic to the Three Kings Islands. It lives mainly on kanuka trees.

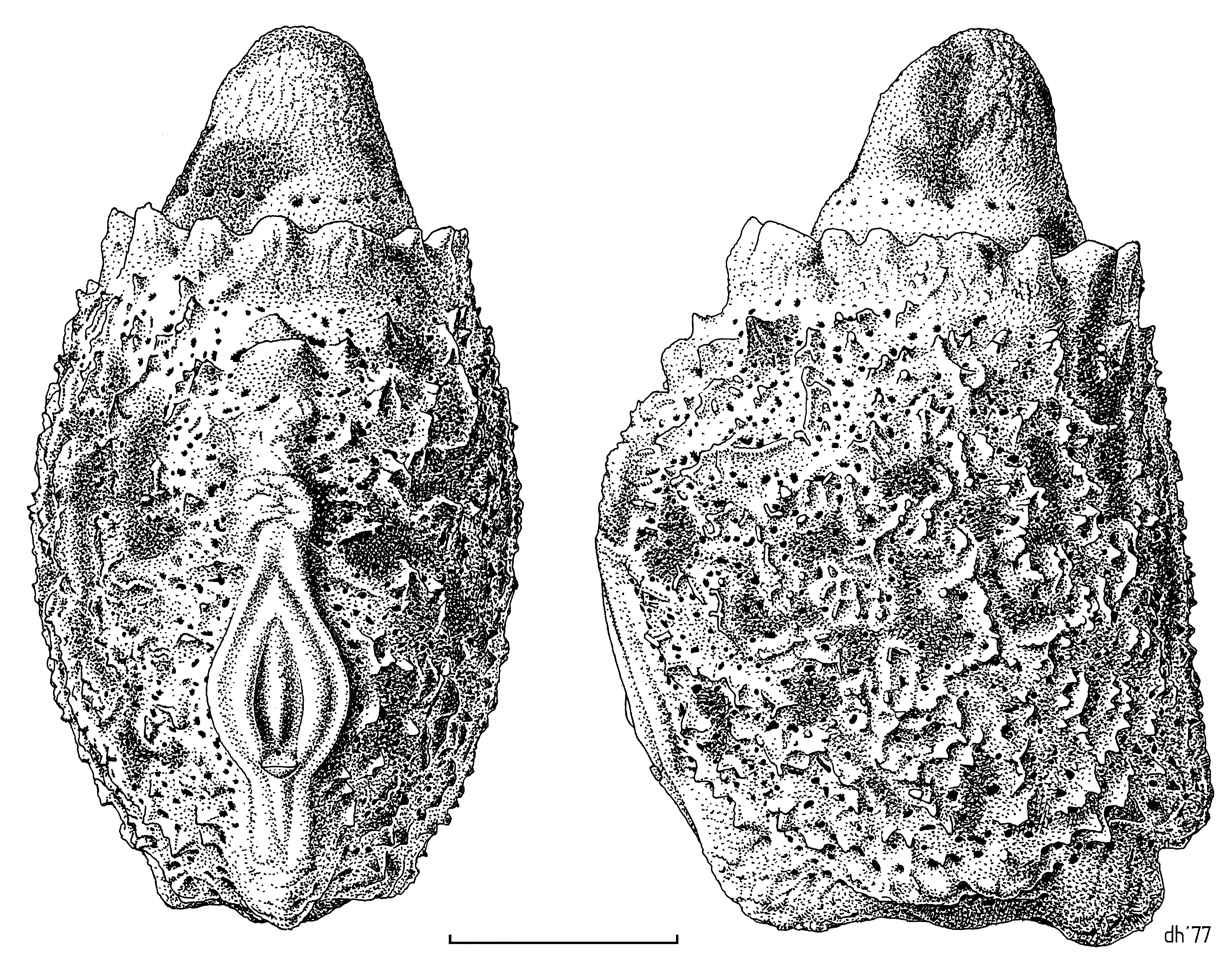
Illustration of Pseudoclitarchus senta egg by Des Helmore
