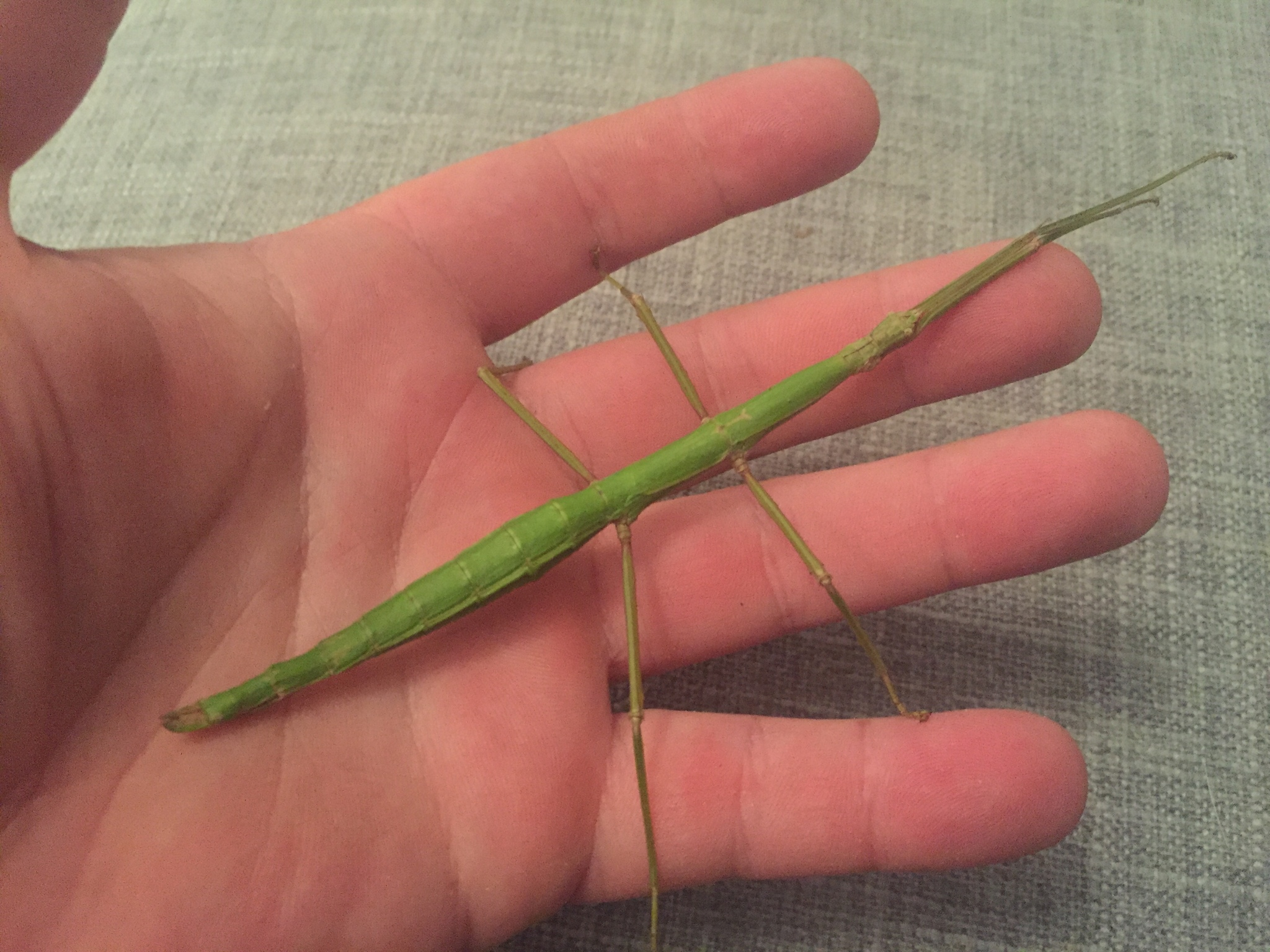
- An unarmed stick insect (Acanthoxyla inermis) seen in Wellington

Conservation status
- Not Threatened (NZ TCS)

Scientific classification
- Kingdom: Animalia
- Phylum: Arthropoda
- Clade: Pancrustacea
- Class: Insecta
- Order: Phasmatodea
- Family: Phasmatidae
- Genus: Acanthoxyla
- Species: A. inermis

Binomial name
- Acanthoxyla inermis Salmon, 1955

Synonyms
- Acanthoxyla prasina Salmon, 1955

= Acanthoxyla inermis =

Species of stick insect

Acanthoxyla inermis (the unarmed stick insect) is an insect that was described by John Salmon in 1955. Acanthoxyla inermis is included in the genus Acanthoxyla, and family Phasmatidae. No subspecies are listed. This species is native to New Zealand but has been unintentionally moved to Great Britain where it has grown a stable population and is the longest insect observed in the UK, and the most common of the stick insects that have established themselves on the island.

== Anatomy ==
A. inermis has a long thin body and three pairs of thin jointed limbs resembling twigs. The species has been observed as having many superficial differences in appearance among individuals: The body colour and texture is varied and is many shades green, brown or yellow. Adult members of this species can grow to 10 cm long. The bodies of this genus are sometimes covered in spines while other specimens have perfectly smooth bodies and others still have a series of tubercles.

== Defence mechanisms ==
Acanthoxyla inermis, like other stick insects is very well camouflaged for its habitat. The long thin body is very hard to make out from real sticks which provides these insects with a way to hide in plain sight. As well as looking like a small branch in a tree, stick insects also behave like a part of the tree, performing swaying motions to give the appearance of moving in the breeze as the rest of the plant may.

== Life cycle ==
As members of the family Phasmidea, A. inermis grows by incomplete metamorphosis; it grows by a series of moults. Generally a stick insect will moult between five and ten times between hatching from the egg and mature adulthood. The life of a stick insect consists of four stages: Adults lay their ova (eggs) either by dropping them to the ground or depositing them within a suitable substrate. The ova are often hardy so they can withstand falling from height and the cold winter conditions they are often exposed to. The length of the egg stage can vary from as little as two weeks to over 18 months. After hatching from their eggs, nymphs quickly move to find a suitable vegetation that they can scale in order to find food in the form of leaves and the safety of the environment they are so well camouflaged for. Nymphs go through a series of moults before maturing to an adults which allows them to grow in the absence of their hard exoskeleton and also regenerate limbs that may have lost through a process called autotomy. Nymphs will generally eat their shed skin after a moult. Sub-adult stage refers to the final moult before being a true adult of its species. This is a short part of the life cycle and the last before the insect reaches the stage of reproduction

The adult stage of a stick insect generally lasts six months to a year, during this period the animal's life is devoted to feeding and reproduction. A. inermis spends most of its life on trees, eating leaves in relative safety. Acanthoxyla inermis seems to reproduce entirely asexually so while she feeds the female drops her eggs without having to move or compete with other members of her species for mates.

== Reproduction ==
From what has been observed, A. inermis reproduces entirely asexually through a process called parthenogenesis. Given that they haven't been seen to reproduce sexually at all they can be called obligately parthenogenic. Some other species of stick insect are facultatively parthenogenic meaning they can reproduce both sexually and asexually. The female of the species which appears to be the only members that are produced is able to spit her egg cells and recombine them to produce clones of herself. Because of the ability to carry on populations like this the male of the species is functionally redundant which has given A. inermis the ability to set up breeding populations from just one female individual. Such a situation occurred when timber was being transport to the United Kingdom in the 1920s and since its arrival A. inermis has become the most common stick insect in Great Britain which has no native species of phasmatodea but several that have invaded in similar ways to the Unarmed Stick Insect. This form of reproduction does make A. inermis (and others) vulnerable to environmental change as they have removed the mixing of their population's genetic code, reducing their genetic diversity, as well as removing the chance for DNA repair. However, the lineage is the result of interspecific hybridisation so individuals have high allelic diversity. The genus Acanthoxyla is the result of hybridisation and the many parthenogenetic lineages within this genus are morphologically different and many are triploid. The process of parthenogenesis means that identification of species cannot rely on the biological species concept.

In 2016, a single male specimen of A. inermis was observed in the United Kingdom. Some lineages of Acanthoxyla are triploid but Acanthoxyla inermis is diploid and therefore males can be produced if one X-chromosome is lost during egg production.

== Behaviour ==
Stick insects are known for their behavioural adaptations for blending in with their environments. As well as their convincing appearance, stick insects are known to sway their bodies both when they walk and while stationary which has long been thought to make their camouflage more convincing; swaying like a twig in the wind. It has been suggested more recently that it may also help the animal's vision, helping it distinguish between those branches and leaves that move with it and objects unattached from the substrate it is on.

== In Māori culture ==
There is scattered mention of stick insects in Māori legends. Like all insects they are said to be children of Tane and are to be respected. They have been said to signify several different things: If a stick insect (or mantis) landed on a woman it was said to be a sign she was pregnant. It was said that if a stick insect is present the location was unsuitable for a garden. Other stories stated that if a stick insect landed on someone it was a sign they had entered a sacred place.

== See also ==
- List of stick insects of New Zealand
