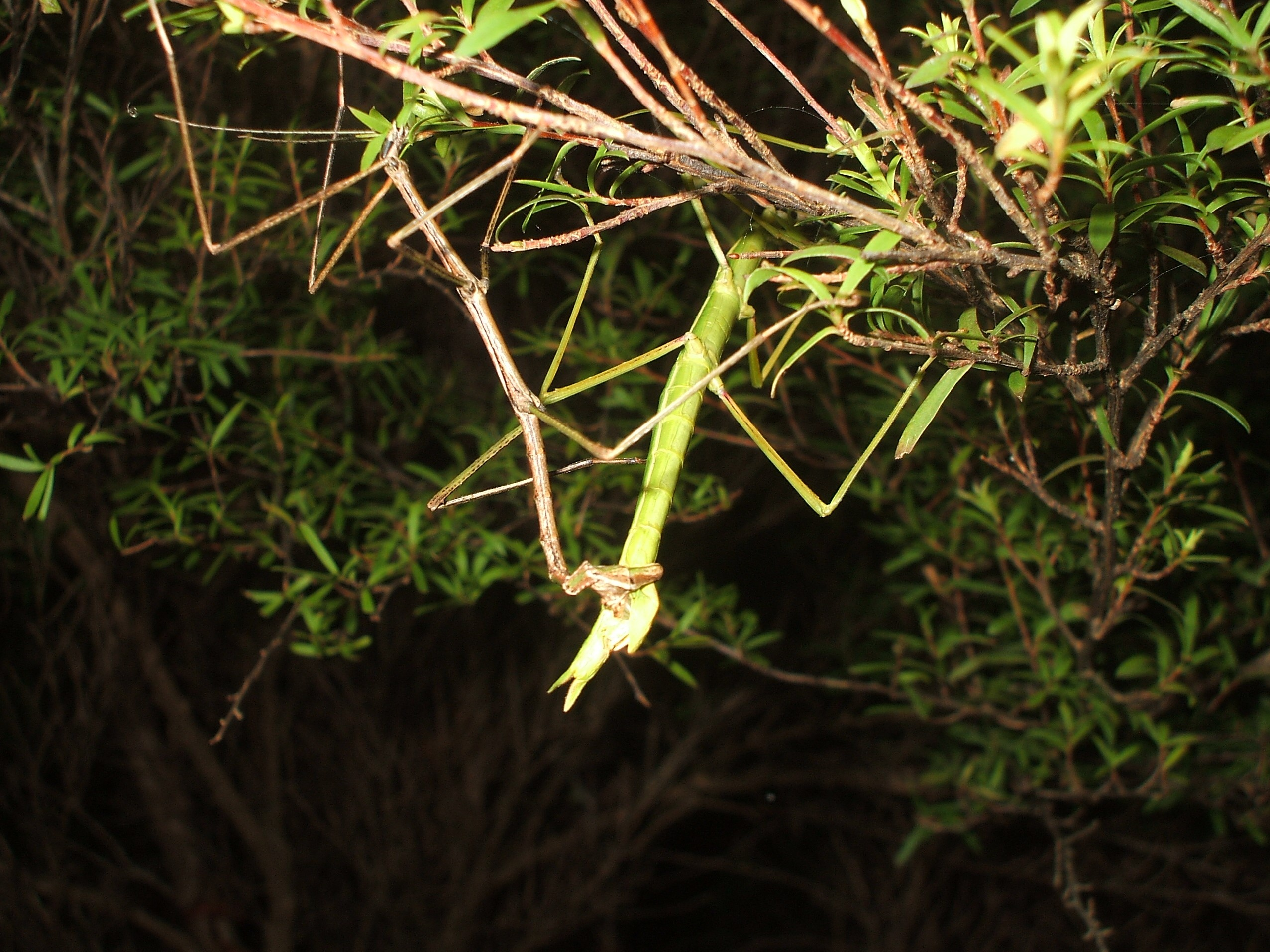
- Clitarchus hookeri mating pair

Scientific classification
- Kingdom: Animalia
- Phylum: Arthropoda
- Class: Insecta
- Order: Phasmatodea
- Family: Phasmatidae
- Subfamily: Phasmatinae
- Tribe: Acanthoxylini
- Genus: Clitarchus; Stål, 1875

= Clitarchus (phasmid) =

Genus of stick insects

Clitarchus is a genus of stick insects in the Phasmatidae family and Phasmatinae sub-family. This genus is the most common stick insect in New Zealand. It is found widely throughout the North Island and part of the South Island on kanuka and manuka, as well as various common garden plants.

== Species ==
There are currently three recognized species in this genus:

- Clitarchus hookeri White, 1846
- Clitarchus tepaki Buckley, Myers and Bradler, 2014
- Clitarchus rakauwhakanekeneke Buckley, Myers and Bradler, 2014
