= Tepakiphasma =

Conservation status
- Nationally Critical (NZ TCS)

Scientific classification
- Kingdom: Animalia
- Phylum: Arthropoda
- Clade: Pancrustacea
- Class: Insecta
- Order: Phasmatodea
- Family: Phasmatidae
- Genus: Tepakiphasma; Buckley and Bradler, 2010
- Species: T. ngatikuri

Binomial name
- Tepakiphasma ngatikuri Buckley and Bradler, 2010

Genus of stick insects

Tepakiphasma ngatikuri is a stick insect of the family Phasmatidae, endemic to a single patch of forest near the northernmost tip of the North Island, New Zealand. It was not discovered until 2008, and is the only member of the genus Tepakiphasma.

Nymphs of T. ngatikuri were first collected in Radar Bush, Te Paki Recreation Reserve, in December 2008. Radar Bush, a 65 ha forest remnant 9.5 km south-east of Cape Reinga, is home to several very localised Northland species such as the slight skink (Oligosoma levidensum) and Bartlett's rātā (Metrosideros bartlettii). The two nymphs were reared to adulthood, and the new species was described and named in 2010. Its genus name is taken from the type locality of Te Paki (or North Cape), and its species name is from the Ngāti Kurī people of Northland, whose area of interest includes Te Paki.

Tepakiphasma ngatikuri is a moderately large (10 cm) stick insect, slender and wingless. Its body is mottled grey and brown, with no spines and sparsely scattered tubercles. Its most distinctive feature is its egg, which has a conical perforated cap, a structure seen on no other New Zealand stick insects but found in some overseas groups. The only known specimens were collected from white rātā (Metrosideros perforata).

Although the surrounding area has been searched, no specimens of T. ngatikuri have been found anywhere but Radar Bush. Because the species occurs in just one small location, making it extremely vulnerable to extinction from accidental fire or introduced predators, it has been classed as Nationally Critical under the Department of Conservation's Threat Classification System.

== See also ==
- List of stick insects of New Zealand
