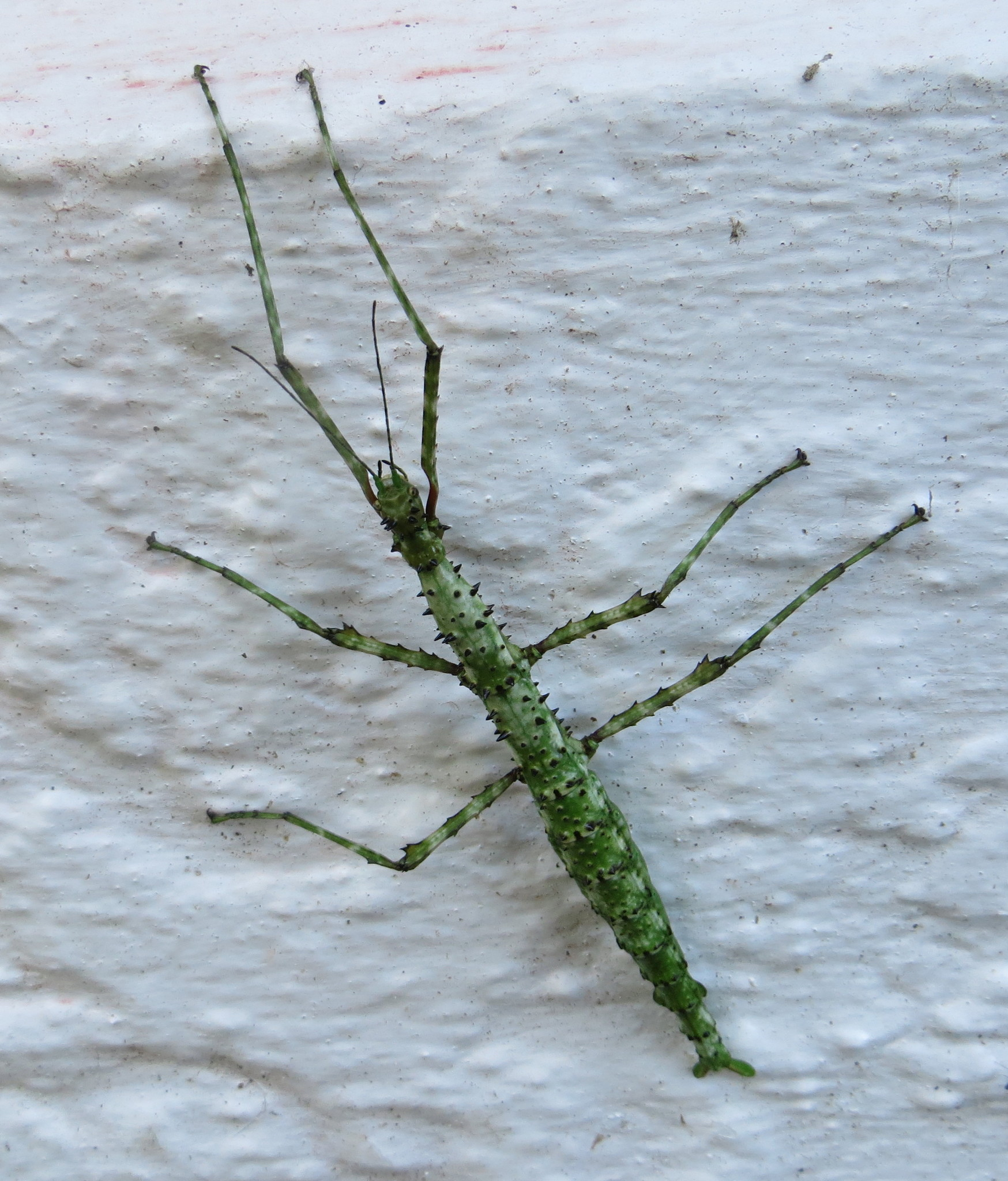

Scientific classification
- Kingdom: Animalia
- Phylum: Arthropoda
- Clade: Pancrustacea
- Class: Insecta
- Order: Phasmatodea
- Family: Phasmatidae
- Genus: Acanthoxyla
- Species: A. prasina

Binomial name
- Acanthoxyla prasina (Westwood, 1859)

Synonyms
- Acanthoderus prasinus Westwood, 1859; Acanthoxyla speciosa Salmon, 1955

= Acanthoxyla prasina =

Prickly stick insect

Species of insect

Acanthoxyla prasina, commonly known as the prickly stick insect, is a stick insect species in the order Phasmatodea and family Phasmatidae. It is native to New Zealand, where it occurs throughout the country, although it is less frequently observed than the more common stick insect species. The species has also been introduced to Britain, especially in Cornwall and Devon, and to the south-west of the Republic of Ireland. Its thorn-covered body provides effective camouflage among foliage.

== Identification ==
Adult Acanthoxyla prasina are relatively large, ranging from 7.5 to 11 cm in body length. They tend to be broader than other New Zealand stick insects and occur in green or brown-coloured forms. Eight subspecies have been described, some of which bear prominent dark spines on the thorax and abdomen. The species shows variation in the number and size of its characteristic spines, including a distinctive projection beneath the abdomen at the base of the subgenital plate. Black-tipped spines occur across the head, thorax, abdomen and femora. The antennae are typically slightly longer than the fore femora, and the terminal segment of the abdomen is shorter and more rounded than in related species. These features, along with cryptic body colouring and behaviour, provide effective protection from predators.

== Life cycle and reproduction ==
Acanthoxyla prasina consists entirely of females and reproduces through parthenogenesis, a form of asexual reproduction. The eggs measure approximately 4.2 mm by 1.8 mm, are brown-grey in colour, and covered with fine spines. Females drop their eggs to the ground, where they remain dormant through winter and hatch in spring as temperatures rise. Although a single female can lay hundreds of eggs during her life, up to 99% fail to hatch successfully. Newly hatched nymphs are about 2 cm long and moult five or six times over roughly six months before reaching maturity, often shedding their skin at night and consuming it afterwards. Individuals in the genus Acanthoxyla typically live for one to two years.

== Distribution and habitat ==
=== Native range ===
The species is endemic to New Zealand, where it occurs widely across native and modified habitats.

=== Introduced range ===
A. prasina was accidentally introduced to Paignton, United Kingdom, around 1910. Some reports have misidentified these populations as other Acanthoxyla subspecies or as the smooth stick insect Clitarchus hookeri. Until recently, all known members of the genus were female. In 2016, a single male was discovered in Cornwall, the first recorded of any Acanthoxyla species, and was thought to be a rare mutation

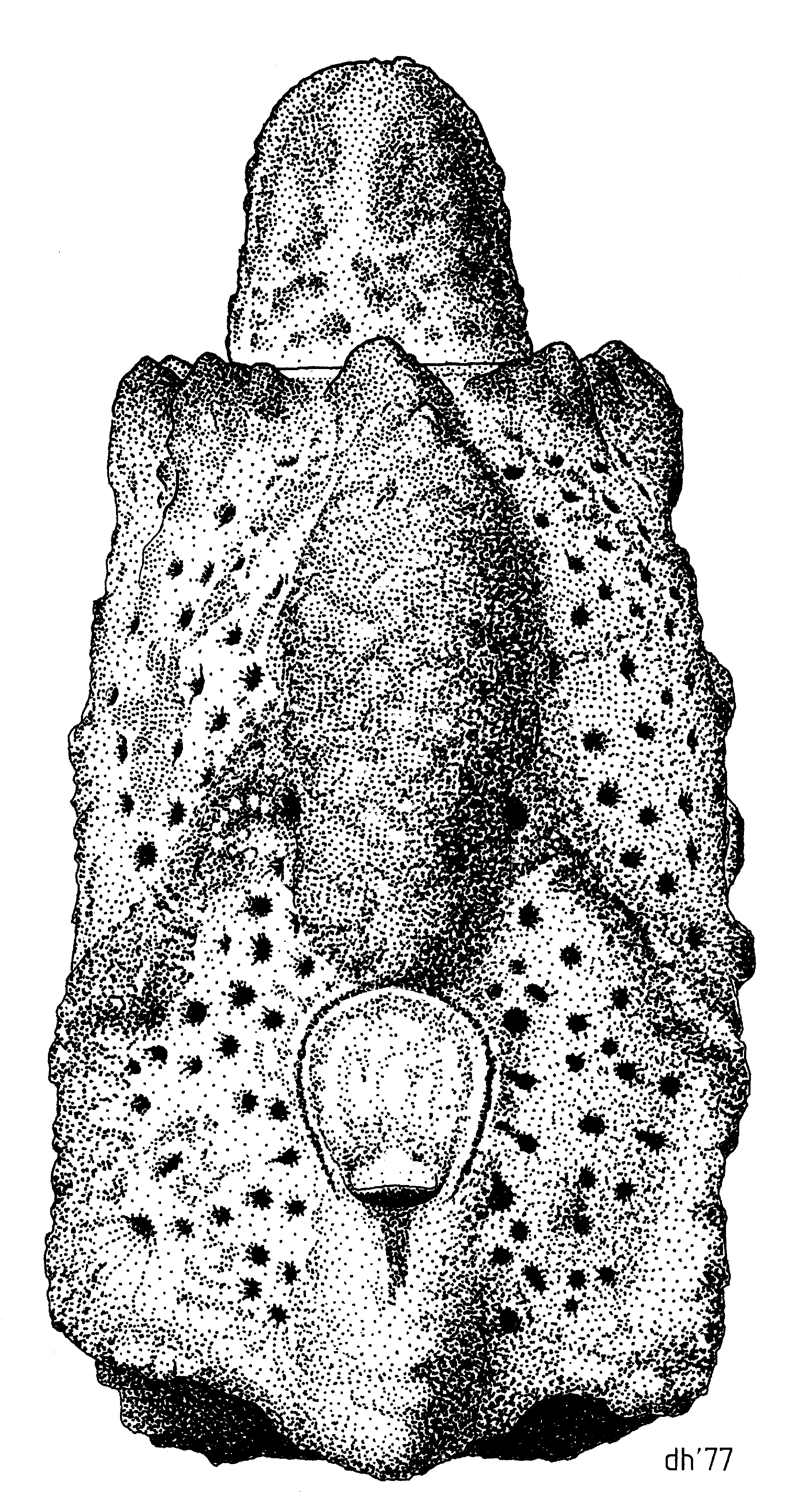
Acanthoxyla prasina egg illustration by Des Helmore

== Diet ==
The prickly stick insect is a generalist feeder that consumes a range of native and introduced plants. In addition to broad-leaved species, it also consumes conifers such as radiata pine, macrocarpa, and cypress, as well as common garden plants. The species is nocturnal, in particular mostly feeding at night.

== Predators ==
Birds are the main predators of A. prasina. Native, as well as introduced species, including house sparrows, common blackbirds, silvereyes, chaffinches and yellowhammers, are known to prey upon it.

== Māori significance ==
Traditional knowledge of stick insects among Māori communities has been only partly preserved, but stick insects, known by names such as rō, whe, and wairaka, were regarded as relatives of mantids. In some traditions, if a stick insect or mantis landed on a woman, it was interpreted as confirmation of pregnancy, with the insect’s species said to predict the child’s sex. Insects falling onto a person in the forest could mark the spot as sacred, and their presence was sometimes taken as a warning that the soil would make a poor garden site. Māori oral tradition also connects stick insects to Tāne, the god of forests and creator of insects.

== Hybridisation ==
Genetic studies indicate that the entire genus Acanthoxyla arose through historical hybridisation events, producing both diploid and triploid lineages. The group may have originated from Clitarchus hookeri through two or more hybridisation events, possibly involving Pseudoclitarchus sentus or an extinct sexual ancestor. Low genetic diversity across Acanthoxyla species suggests limited differentiation within the genus.

== See also ==
- List of stick insects of New Zealand
