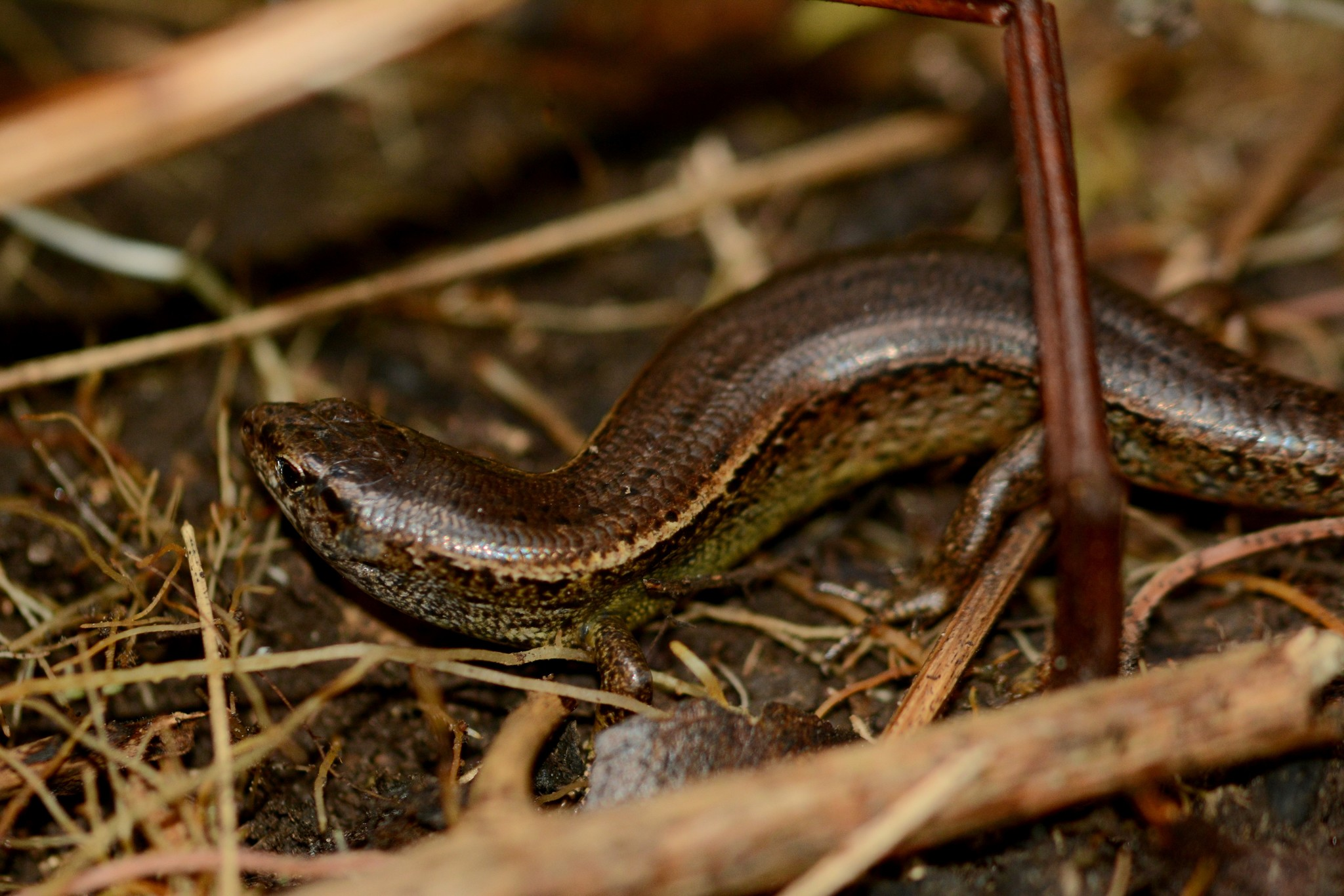

Scientific classification
- Kingdom: Animalia
- Phylum: Chordata
- Order: Squamata
- Family: Scincidae
- Genus: Oligosoma
- Species: O. aeneum

Binomial name
- Oligosoma aeneum (Girard 1857)
- Distribution of the copper skink in the North Island Known native range

Synonyms
- Cyclodina aenea; Leiolopisma aeneum; Lygosoma aeneum; Oligosoma aenea

= Copper skink =

Species of lizard

The copper skink (Oligosoma aeneum) is a skink of the family Scincidae that is endemic to the North Island of New Zealand.

== Taxonomy and systematics ==
The number of skink species endemic to New Zealand is not yet known, as advancing molecular studies indicate genetic divergence amongst many groups previously considered a single species. At present, there is estimated to be between 50 and 60 species, all of the family Scincidae. Following a taxonomic revision of the species complex in 2008, the copper skink was assigned the scientific name of Cyclodina aenea, and found to be both genetically and morphologically diverged from two other skink species that were previously considered synonymic.

The initial arrival of the copper skink (and indeed any other skink species) to New Zealand is somewhat uncertain, and is a topic of considerable debate. The level of genetic diversity between the copper skink and other indigenous species suggests strongly that they and their ancestors have been a part of New Zealand's fauna for millions of years, allowing time for many early species to diverge and become distinct from each other. One 2009 study by Chapple, Ritchie and Daugherty, investigating "the origin and diversification" of New Zealand's skinks, produced a molecular phylogeny by analysing genetic sequences of all but one living species. It suggested that all indigenous New Zealand skinks form a monophyletic group with a single ancestor, and that they initially arrived during the early Miocene era, by clinging to floating debris from New Caledonia. From this early colonisation they underwent adaptive radiation to fill a variety of ecological niches, spreading across New Zealand to form the numerous species known today.

The species was first described by Charles Frédéric Girard in 1857, under the name Cyclodina aenea. The species was placed into various genera, receiving names including Lygosoma aeneum and Leiolopisma aeneum, and was moved to the genus Oligosoma in 2009.

Both the species epithet, aeneum and the common name refer to the copper or bronze colouring of the species.

== Anatomy ==
The copper skink is New Zealand's smallest indigenous skink, with a mature snout–vent length of no more than 76 mm (3.0 in). Like most skinks, it has smooth skin covering a long body, with relatively short legs. The tail makes up a considerable proportion of the body length, and tapers to a point. The skink is capable of shedding its tail to distract predators when threatened, before regenerating a new one – a process known as caudal autotomy. Copper skinks have small heads with round, lidded eyes, which they are capable of blinking.

The species can be differentiated from the invasive rainbow skink (Lampropholis delicata) as the copper skink has divided scales on its head separated along the midline, as well as alternating black and white markings on its lower jaw.

== Ecology and behaviour ==
The copper skink occupies a range of habitats, from forested areas to urban gardens, sand dune ecosystems, and farm land. Like many skinks, it has a largely carnivorous diet and feeds mostly on small insects and other invertebrates. Copper skinks are viviparous, and mate in spring before giving birth to between 3-7 relatively large offspring in late summer.

The species is primarily active during the daytime, and occasionally in twilight.

== Distribution ==
The skink is found across the North Island of New Zealand, but is absent from much of the Hawkes Bay area. In addition, the species can be found on many islands off the coast of the North Island, including Great Barrier Island and Little Barrier Island.

== Conservation ==
Despite the dramatic alteration of New Zealand's landscape by humans, the copper skink has adapted relatively well to urbanisation of its environment. In 2012 the Department of Conservation (DOC) classified the copper skink as Not Threatened under the New Zealand Threat Classification System. It is a common sight in many Auckland gardens, due to its ability to thrive in a range of microhabitats. In the early 1980s (when this species had unprotected status) about a dozen adult Copper Skinks were captured in a park near Tauranga and released in the Lynmore suburb of Rotorua where there was no natural population. Despite a large domestic cat population the descendants of these relocated Copper Skinks are still present with juveniles regularly found at the original release site (most recent obs July 2020). This demonstrates that relocations of this species into urban gardens can be successful. However, introduced mammalian predators such as cats, rodents and hedgehogs have proven to reduce their population numbers in many regions.

In addition to the threat of mammalian predators, there are concerns that the competition for resources between the copper skink and the introduced rainbow skink (Lampropholis delicata) may present a further threat to copper skink populations. A prolific breeder, the rainbow skink occupies a very similar niche to the copper skink in terms of habitat and diet, indicating a significant competition between the species. Despite the concern, there has been relatively little research conducted into the potential effects of rainbow skinks in New Zealand. One 2004 study did compare the condition of captive copper and rainbow skinks housed together with those housed separately, and did not find significant difference between the two. However, due to the high overlap of the species' resource requirements, the rainbow skink is still considered by many to be a potential threat to copper skink populations.
