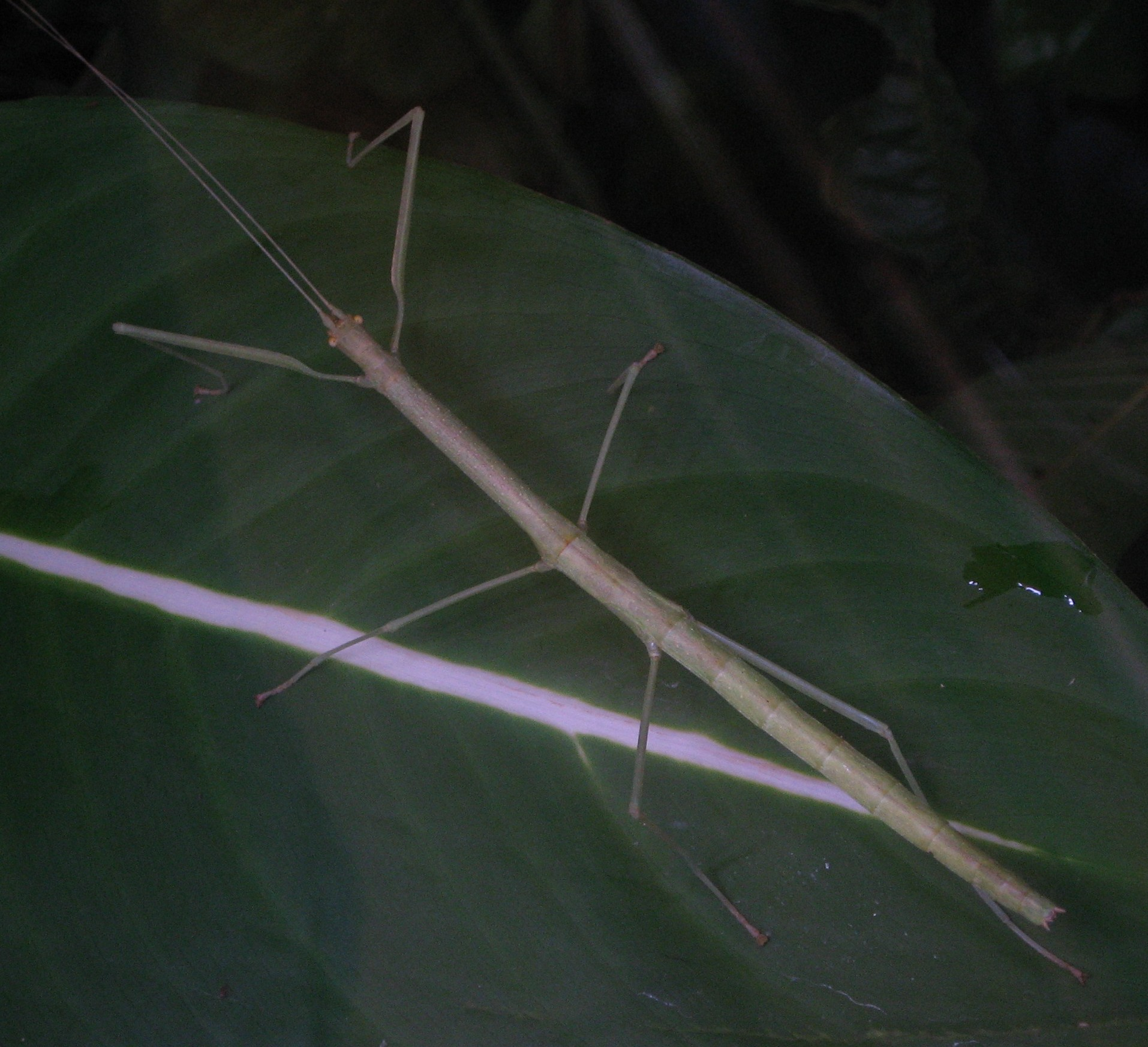
- Paraclonistria nigramal

Scientific classification
- Kingdom: Animalia
- Phylum: Arthropoda
- Clade: Pancrustacea
- Class: Insecta
- Order: Phasmatodea
- Family: Diapheromeridae
- Subfamily: Diapheromerinae
- Tribe: Diapheromerini; Kirby, 1904

Synonyms
- Eusermyleformia Bradler, 2009

= Diapheromerini =

Tribe of stick insects

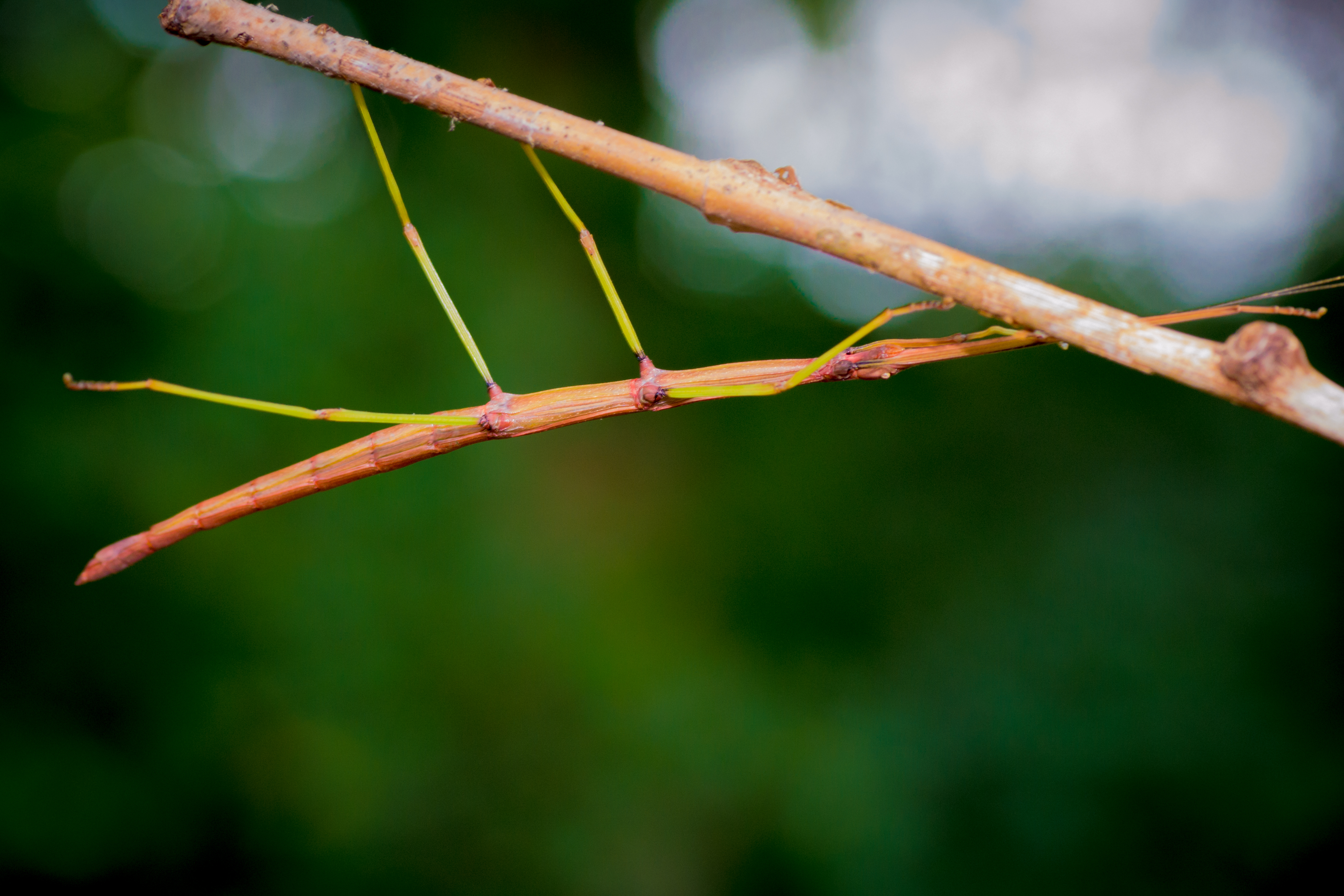
Northern Walkingstick, Diapheromera femorata

Diapheromerini is a tribe of Common Walking Stick Insects in the family Diapheromeridae. There are more than 30 genera and 340 described species in Diapheromerini, found in the Americas, Asia, and southern Africa.

== Genera ==
These 36 genera belong to the tribe Diapheromerini:

- Alienobostra Zompro, 2001
- Bacteria Berthold, 1827 (bacteria stick insects)
- Bactricia Kirby, 1896 (twohorn giant stick insects)
- Bostranova Stål, 1875 (bostra stick insects)
- Calynda Stål, 1875
- Caribbiopheromera Zompro, 2001
- Charmides Stål, 1875
- Clonistria Stål, 1875
- Diapheromera Gray, 1835
- Dyme Stål, 1875
- Globocalynda Zompro, 2001
- Globocrania Hennemann & Conle, 2011
- Laciniobethra Conle, Hennemann & Gutiérrez, 2011
- Laciphorus Redtenbacher, 1908
- Libethra Stål, 1875
- Libethroidea Hebard, 1919
- Litosermyle Hebard, 1919
- Lobolibethra Hennemann & Conle, 2007
- Manomera Rehn & Hebard, 1907
- Megaphasma Caudell, 1903
- Nanolibethra Conle, Hennemann & Gutiérrez, 2011
- Oncotophasma Rehn, 1904
- Otocrania Redtenbacher, 1908
- Paracalynda Zompro, 2001
- Paraclonistria Langlois & Lelong, 1998
- Paraphanocles Zompro, 2001
- Phanocles Stål, 1875
- Phanoclocrania Hennemann & Conle, 2011
- Phanocloidea Zompro, 2001
- Phantasca Redtenbacher, 1906
- Pseudobactricia Brock, 1999
- Pseudoclonistria Langlois & Lelong, 2010
- Pseudosermyle Caudell, 1903
- Sermyle Stål, 1875
- Spinopeplus Zompro, 2001
- Trychopeplus Shelford, 1909
