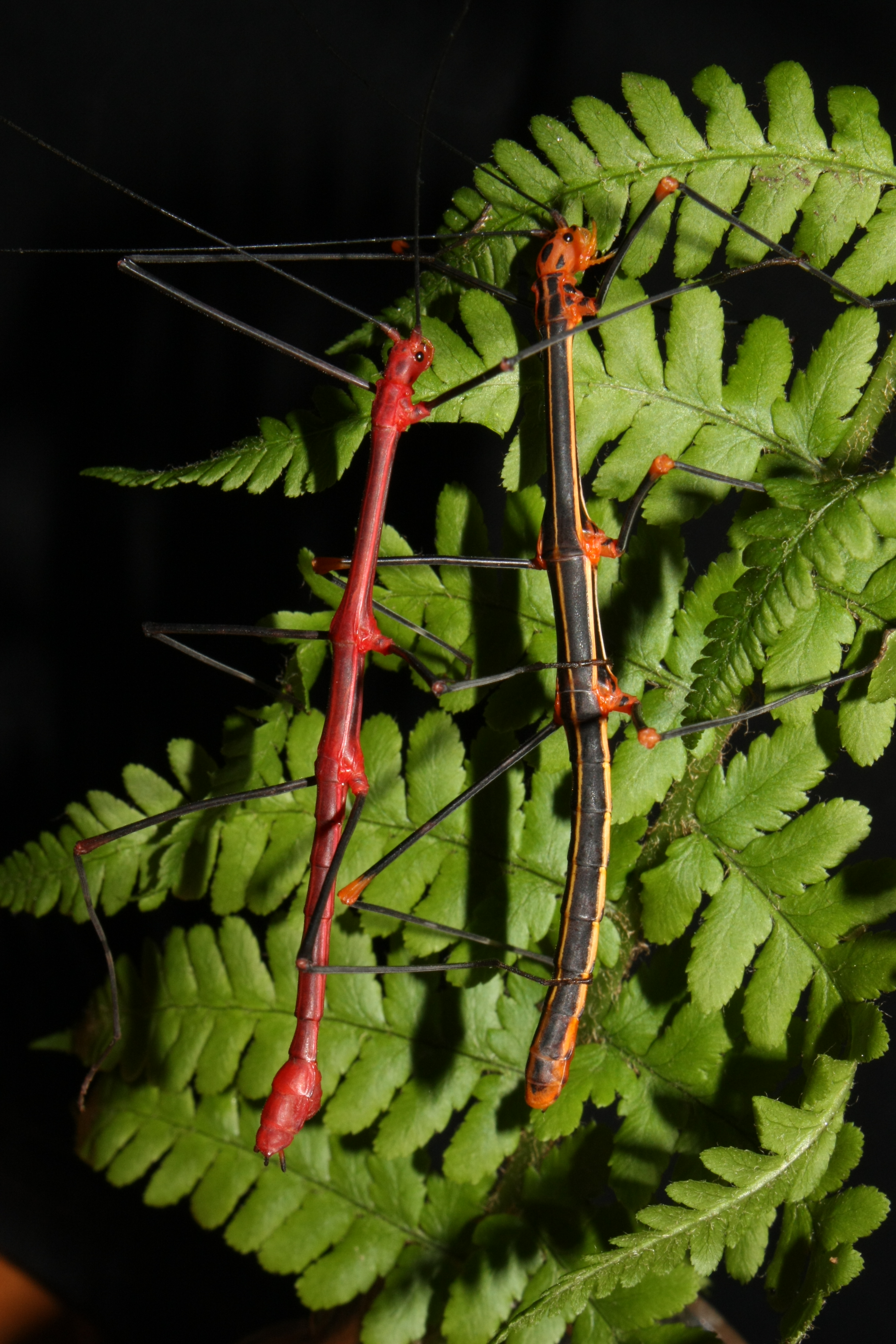
- Adult male (left) and female of Oreophoetes p. peruana (Oreophoetini)

Scientific classification
- Kingdom: Animalia
- Phylum: Arthropoda
- Clade: Pancrustacea
- Class: Insecta
- Order: Phasmatodea
- Family: Diapheromeridae
- Subfamily: Diapheromerinae; Kirby, 1904

Tribes
- Diapheromerini Kirby, 1904; Oreophoetini Zompro, 2001

= Diapheromerinae =

Subfamily of stick insects

Diapheromerinae is a subfamily of the stick insect family Diapheromeridae. They belong to the superfamily Anareolatae of suborder Verophasmatodea.

The family contains the huge Paraphanocles keratosqueleton, often discussed under its obsolete name Bostra maxwelli and known as godhorse or hag's horse in Barbados. It belongs to the typical tribe of Diapheromerinae, the Diapheromerini. It grows to over 30 cm (12 in) long and is known for its slow-moving stick-like appearance. In A-Z of Barbados Heritage, the species is discussed thus:

Godhorse. The local name of unknown origin for the walking stick insect which may grow to 33 cm. ... Many people are afraid of it, on the grounds that if given a chance, it will crawl into a human ear, though there is no record of any having done so. There is a superstitious belief that the presence of a godhorse around the house means a death will occur at the house. They are harmless to man but are generally disliked and Rev. Hughes common name of Hag's Horse conveys this.

== Systematics ==
Two tribes are generally recognized in the subfamily Diapheromerinae, Diapheromerini with about 27 genera and Oreophoetini with about 11. In addition, 23 genera are "unassigned" to a tribe. A third tribe, Ocnophilini, has been considered part of Diapheromerinae in the past, but its genera are now included in Oreophoetini.

Some notable species of Diapheromerinae include:

- Manomera blatchleyi, blatchley walkingstick
- Diapheromera femorata, common American walkingstick, northern walkingstick
- Megaphasma denticrus, giant walkingstick
- Diapheromera velii, prairie walkingstick
- Bactricia bituberculata, twohorn giant stick Insect

== Genera ==
These 60 genera belong to the subfamily Diapheromerinae:

- Alienobostra Zompro, 2001
- Andeocalynda Hennemann & Conle, 2020
- Aplopocranidium Zompro, 2004
- Arumatia Ghirotto, 2022
- Bacteria Berthold, 1827 (Bacteria Stick Insects)
- Bactricia Kirby, 1896 (Twohorn Giant Stick Insects)
- Bostriana Hennemann, Conle & Valero, 2021
- Calynda Stål, 1875
- Caribbiopheromera Zompro, 2001
- Charmides Stål, 1875
- Cladomorphus Gray, 1835
- Clonistria Stål, 1875
- Cranidium Westwood, 1843
- Diapheromera Gray, 1835
- Dubiophasma Zompro, 2001
- Dyme Stål, 1875
- Exocnophila Zompro, 2001
- Globocalynda Zompro, 2001
- Globocrania Hennemann & Conle, 2024
- Hirtuleiodes Hennemann & Conle, 2024
- Hirtuleius Stål, 1875
- Jamanistria Bellanger et al., 2023
- Jeremia Redtenbacher, 1908
- Jeremiodes Hennemann & Conle, 2007
- Laciniobethra Conle, Hennemann & Gutiérrez, 2011
- Laciphorus Redtenbacher, 1908
- Lanceobostra Hennemann & Conle, 2024
- Libethra Stål, 1875
- Libethroidea Hebard, 1919
- Litosermyle Hebard, 1919
- Lobolibethra Hennemann & Conle, 2007
- Manomera Rehn & Hebard, 1907
- Megaphasma Caudell, 1903
- Nanolibethra Conle, Hennemann & Gutiérrez, 2011
- Nooxapty López-Mora, 2023
- Ocnophila Brunner von Wattenwyl, 1907
- Ocnophiloidea Zompro, 2001
- Ocreatophasma Hennemann & Conle, 2024
- Oncotophasma Rehn, 1904
- Oreophoetes Rehn, 1904
- Oreophoetophasma Zompro, 2002
- Otocrania Redtenbacher, 1908
- Otocraniella Zompro, 2004
- Paracalynda Zompro, 2001
- Paraclonistria Langlois & Lelong, 1998
- Parocnophila Zompro, 1998
- Parotocrania Hennemann & Conle, 2024
- Phanocles Stål, 1875
- Phanoclocrania Hennemann & Conle, 2024
- Phanocloidea Zompro, 2001
- Phantasca Redtenbacher, 1906
- Pseudobactricia Brock, 1999
- Pseudoclonistria Langlois & Lelong, 2010
- Pseudosermyle Caudell, 1903
- Ramandeun Murcia & Cadena-Castañeda, 2023
- Sermyle Stål, 1875
- Spinocloidea Hennemann & Conle, 2024
- Spinopeplus Zompro, 2001
- Trychopeplus Shelford, 1909
- Xylodus Saussure, 1859
