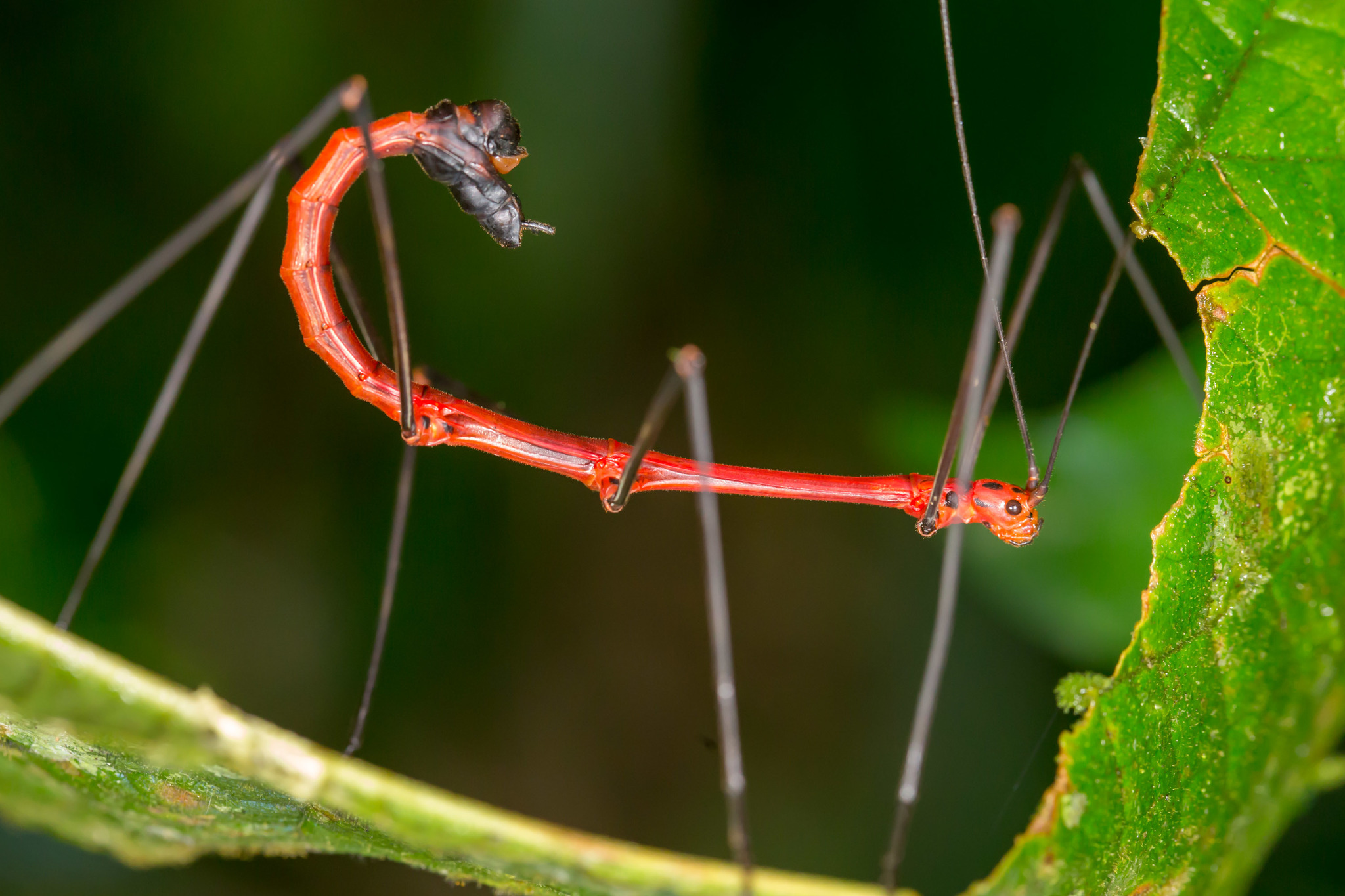
- Oreophoetes peruana, Ecuador

Scientific classification
- Kingdom: Animalia
- Phylum: Arthropoda
- Clade: Pancrustacea
- Class: Insecta
- Order: Phasmatodea
- Family: Diapheromeridae
- Subfamily: Diapheromerinae
- Tribe: Oreophoetini; Zompro, 2001

Synonyms
- Libethrini Günther, 1953; Ocnophilini Zompro, 2001

= Oreophoetini =

Tribe of stick insects

Oreophoetini is a tribe of walking stick insects in the family Diapheromeridae. There are about 11 genera and at least 80 described species in Oreophoetini, found in the Neotropics.

== Genera ==
These 11 genera belong to the tribe Oreophoetini:

- Dubiophasma Zompro, 2001
- Dyme Stål, 1875
- Exocnophila Zompro, 2001
- Libethra Stål, 1875
- Litosermyle Hebard, 1919
- Lobolibethra Hennemann & Conle, 2007
- Ocnophila Brunner von Wattenwyl, 1907
- Ocnophiloidea Zompro, 2001
- Oreophoetes Rehn, 1904
- Oreophoetophasma Zompro, 2002
- Parocnophila Zompro, 1998
