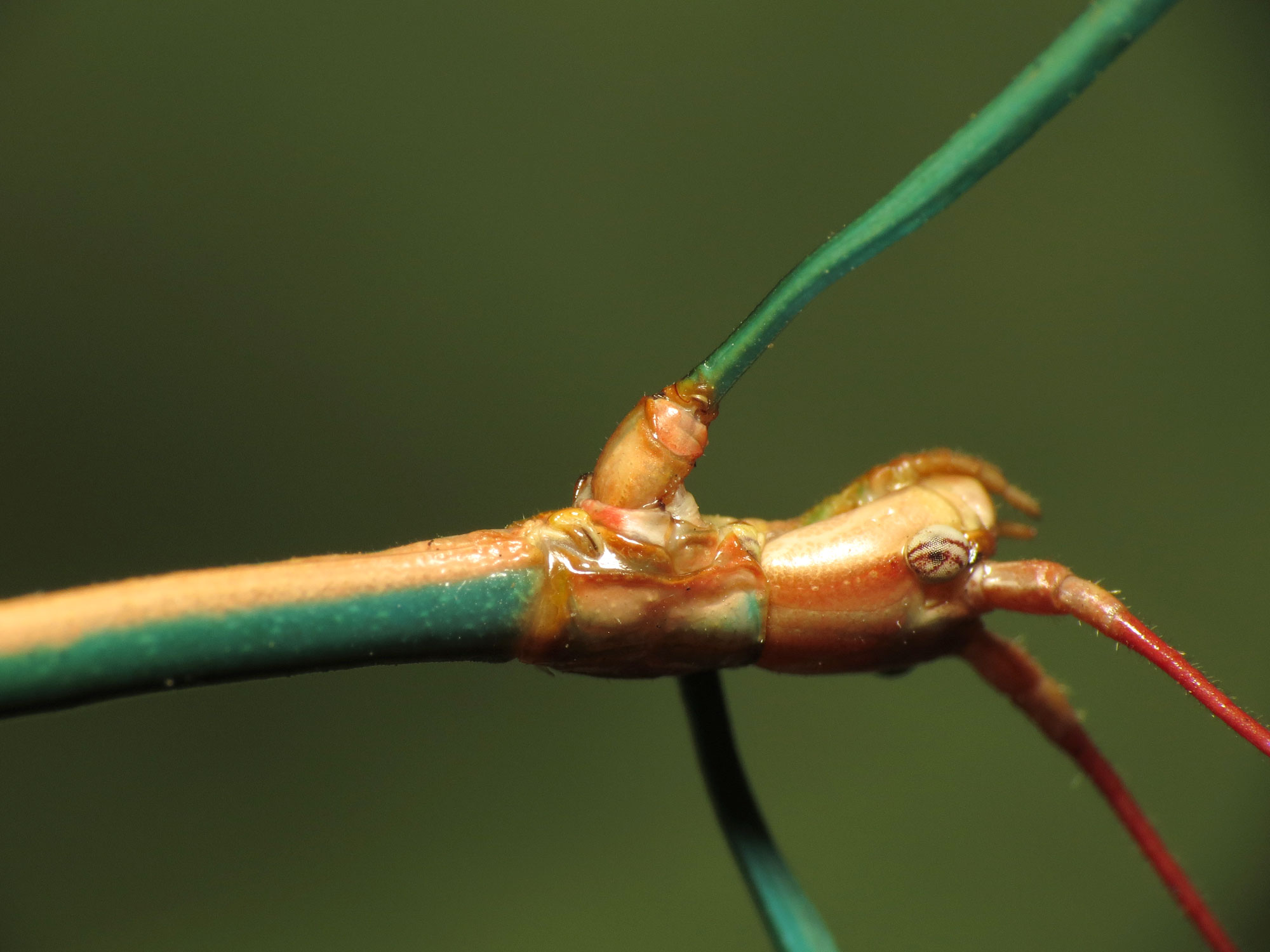

Scientific classification
- Kingdom: Animalia
- Phylum: Arthropoda
- Clade: Pancrustacea
- Class: Insecta
- Order: Phasmatodea
- Family: Diapheromeridae
- Genus: Diapheromera
- Species: D. arizonensis

Binomial name
- Diapheromera arizonensis Caudell, 1903

= Diapheromera arizonensis =

Species of insect

Diapheromera arizonensis, colloquially called the Arizona walkingstick, sometimes the Creosote walking stick (not to be confused with the Creosote bush walking stick, Diapheroma covilleae), is a species of walking stick in the family Diapheromeridae. It is found in North America, particularly in Arizona, part of New Mexico, and the Mexican state of Sonora.

== Description ==
The Creosote walking stick is around 3-6 inches long and mostly brown. They are not venomous and don't have stingers. Stick bugs are herbivores, with the Arizona walking stick preferring native shrubs such as globemallow, creosote, burroweed, and deer weed. They're usually nocturnal.

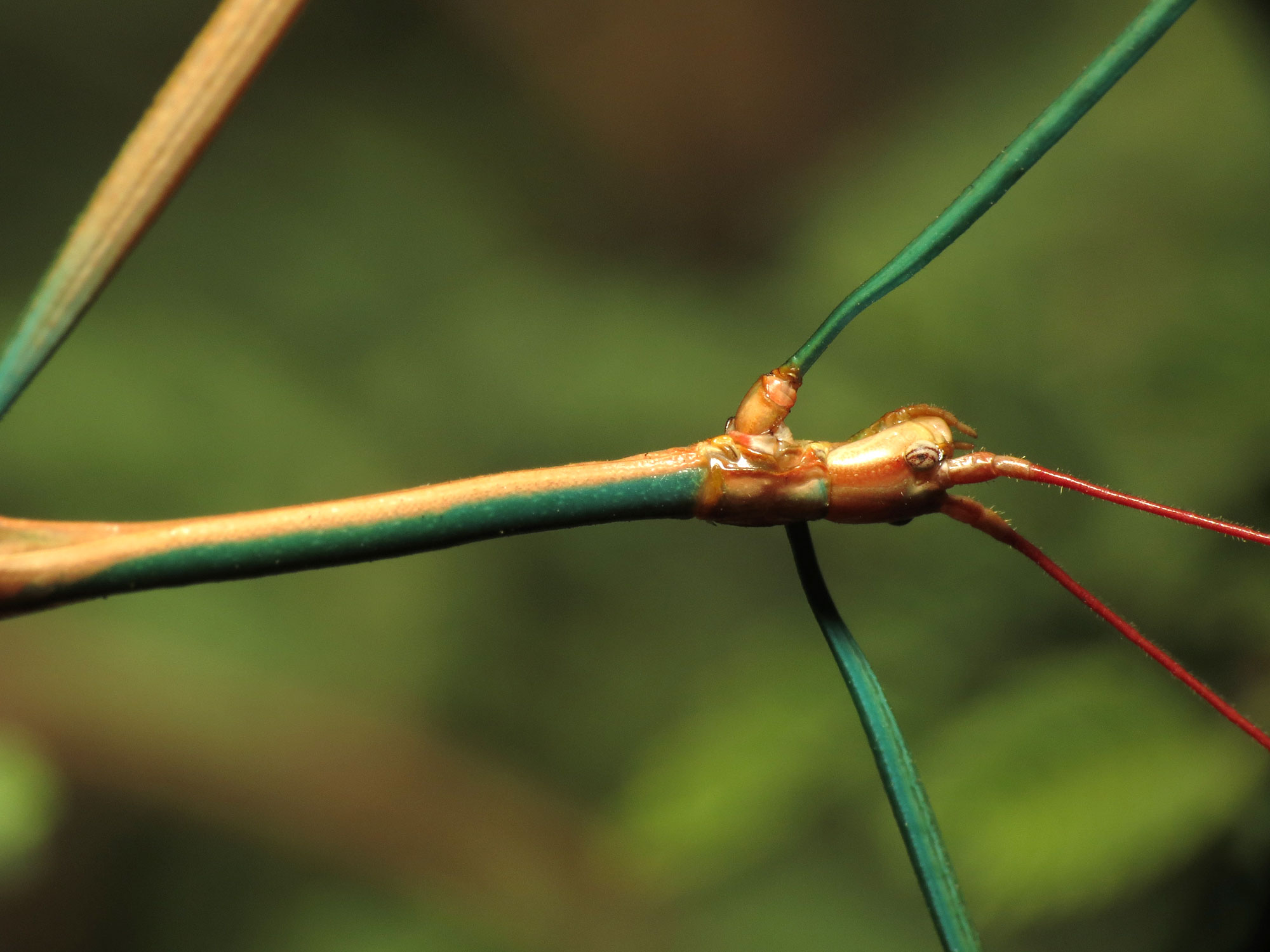
Arizona walkingstick, Diapheromera arizonensis
