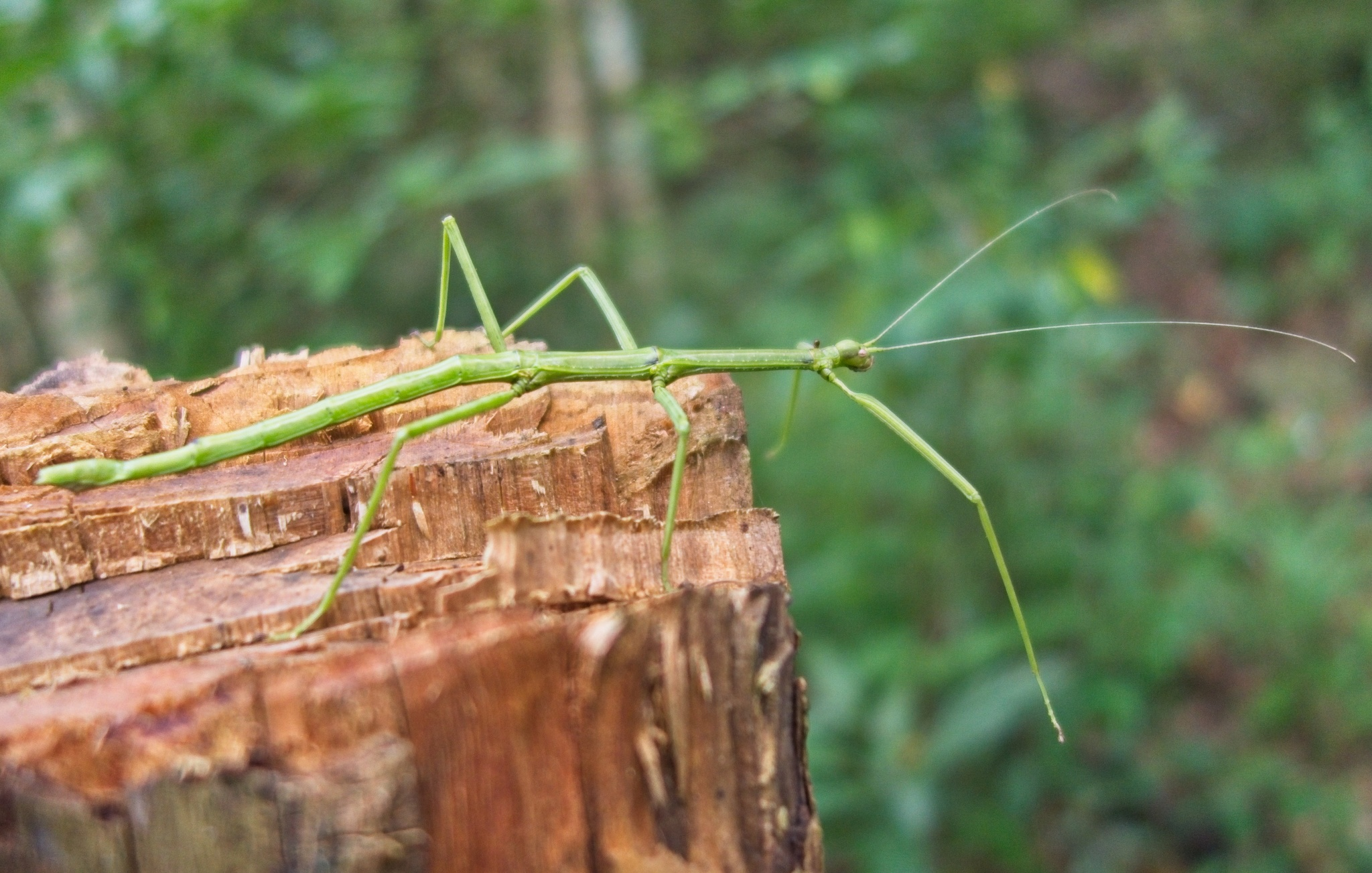

Scientific classification
- Domain: Eukaryota
- Kingdom: Animalia
- Phylum: Arthropoda
- Class: Insecta
- Order: Phasmatodea
- Family: Diapheromeridae
- Subfamily: Diapheromerinae
- Genus: Diapheromera
- Species: D. persimilis

Binomial name
- Diapheromera persimilis Caudell, 1904

= Diapheromera persimilis =

Species of insect

Diapheromera persimilis, the similar walkingstick, is a species of walkingstick in the family Diapheromeridae. It is found in North America.
