= Diapheromera carolina =

Scientific classification
- Domain: Eukaryota
- Kingdom: Animalia
- Phylum: Arthropoda
- Class: Insecta
- Order: Phasmatodea
- Family: Diapheromeridae
- Subfamily: Diapheromerinae
- Genus: Diapheromera
- Species: D. carolina

Binomial name
- Diapheromera carolina Scudder, 1901

Species of insect

Diapheromera carolina, the Carolina walkingstick, is a species of walkingstick in the family Diapheromeridae. It is found in North America.
