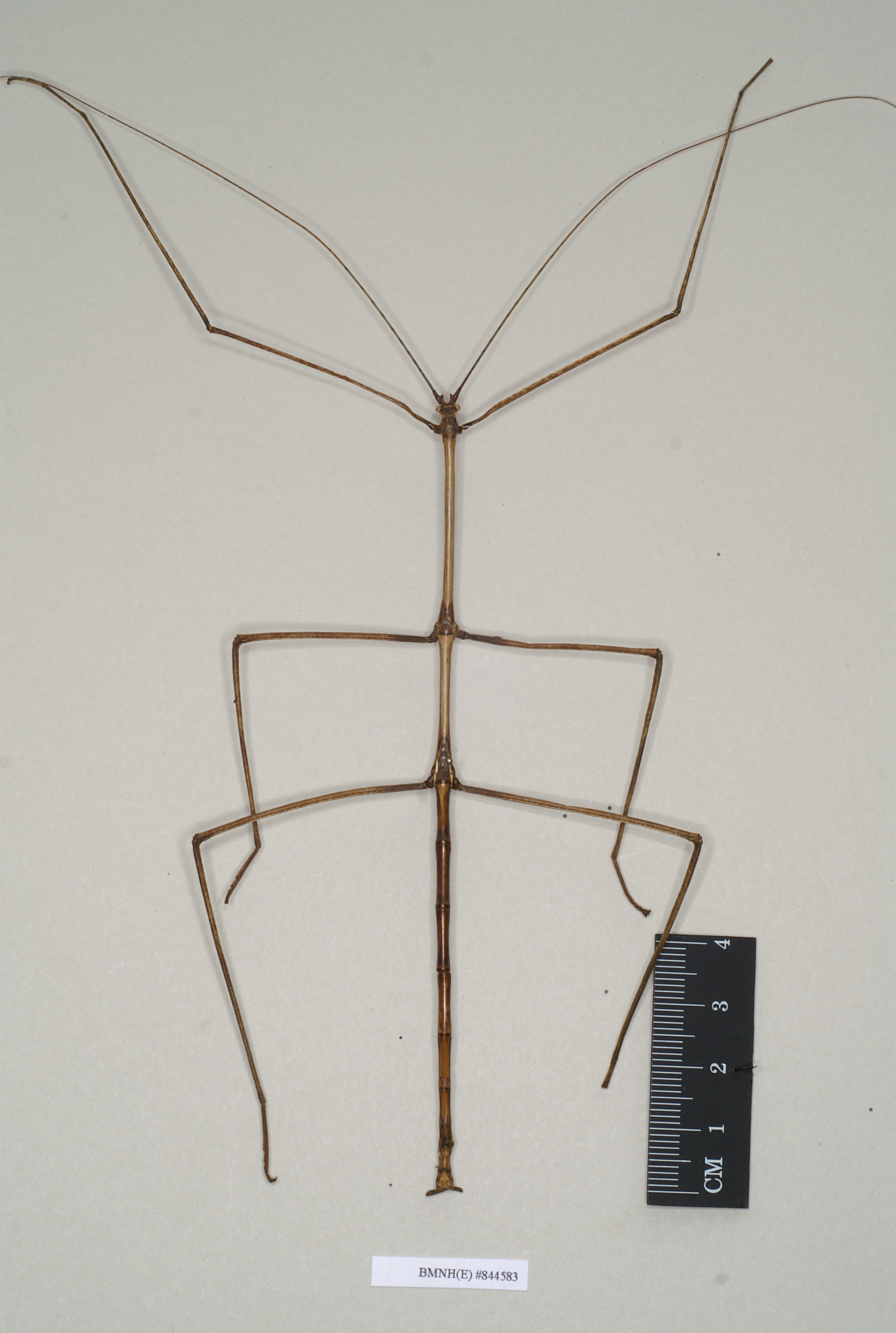

Conservation status
- Extinct (IUCN 3.1)

Scientific classification
- Domain: Eukaryota
- Kingdom: Animalia
- Phylum: Arthropoda
- Class: Insecta
- Order: Phasmatodea
- Family: Diapheromeridae
- Subfamily: Diapheromerinae
- Tribe: Diapheromerini
- Genus: †Pseudobactricia; Brock, 1999
- Species: †P. ridleyi

Binomial name
- †Pseudobactricia ridleyi (Kirby, 1904)

= Pseudobactricia =

Extinct genus of insects

Pseudobactricia ridleyi, also known as Ridley's stick insect, is an extinct stick insect of the family Diapheromeridae. The species was endemic to Singapore. It is the only species in the genus Pseudobactricia.
