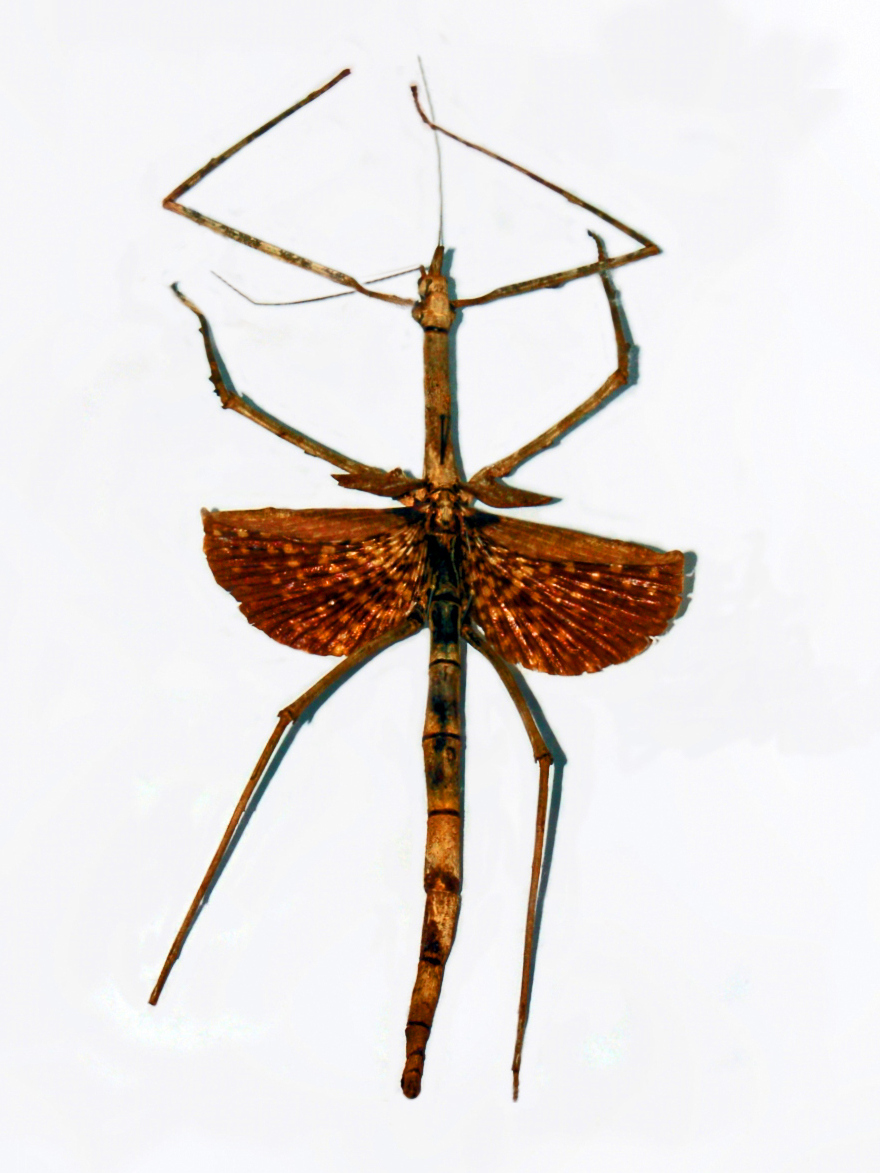
- Bactrododema species from Angola. Museum specimen

Scientific classification
- Kingdom: Animalia
- Phylum: Arthropoda
- Clade: Pancrustacea
- Class: Insecta
- Order: Phasmatodea
- Family: Diapheromeridae
- Subfamily: Palophinae
- Genus: Bactrododema; Stål, 1858

Synonyms
- Palophus

= Bactrododema =

Genus of stick insects

Bactrododema is a genus of the stick insect family Diapheromeridae. Species of this genus have a relictual distribution and are endemic to southern Africa.

== Species ==
- Bactrododema aestuans (Westwood, 1859)
- Bactrododema alldridgei (Kirby, 1905)
- Bactrododema bayeri (Schouteden, 1917)
- Bactrododema centaurum (Westwood, 1859)
- Bactrododema episcopalis (Kirby, 1896)
- Bactrododema hecticum (Lichtenstein, 1796)
- Bactrododema hippotaurum (Karsch, 1896)
- Bactrododema krugeri Brock, 2004
- Bactrododema leopoldi (Schouteden, 1916)
- Bactrododema miliaris Bolívar, 1889
- Bactrododema minotaurus (Gerstaecker, 1883)
- Bactrododema moirae (Kirby, 1896)
- Bactrododema pectinicornis (Redtenbacher, 1908)
- Bactrododema phillipsi (Kirby, 1896)
- Bactrododema reyi (Grandidier, 1869)
- Bactrododema tiaratum Stal, 1858
- Bactrododema wayi Kirby, 1902
- Bactrododema welwitschi Bolívar, 1889
