= Charmides cerberus =

Scientific classification
- Kingdom: Animalia
- Phylum: Arthropoda
- Clade: Pancrustacea
- Class: Insecta
- Order: Phasmatodea
- Family: Diapheromeridae
- Subfamily: Diapheromerinae
- Tribe: Diapheromerini
- Genus: Charmides; Stål, 1875
- Species: C. cerberus

Binomial name
- Charmides cerberus (Westwood, 1859)

Synonyms
- Charnidas Kirby, 1904; Anisomorpha cerberus Westwood, 1859; Charnidas cerberus (Westwood, 1859); Rhaphiderus cerberus (Westwood, 1859)

Species of stick insect

Charmides cerberus is a species of phasmid or stick insect of the monotypic genus Charmides. It is endemic to Sri Lanka.
