= Moritasgus stresemanni =

Scientific classification
- Domain: Eukaryota
- Kingdom: Animalia
- Phylum: Arthropoda
- Class: Insecta
- Order: Phasmatodea
- Family: Diapheromeridae
- Genus: Moritasgus; Günther, 1935
- Species: M. stresemanni

Binomial name
- Moritasgus stresemanni Günther, 1935

Species of insect

Moritasgus is a monotypic genus of phasmids belonging to the family Diapheromeridae. The only species is Moritasgus stresemanni from Sulawesi.
