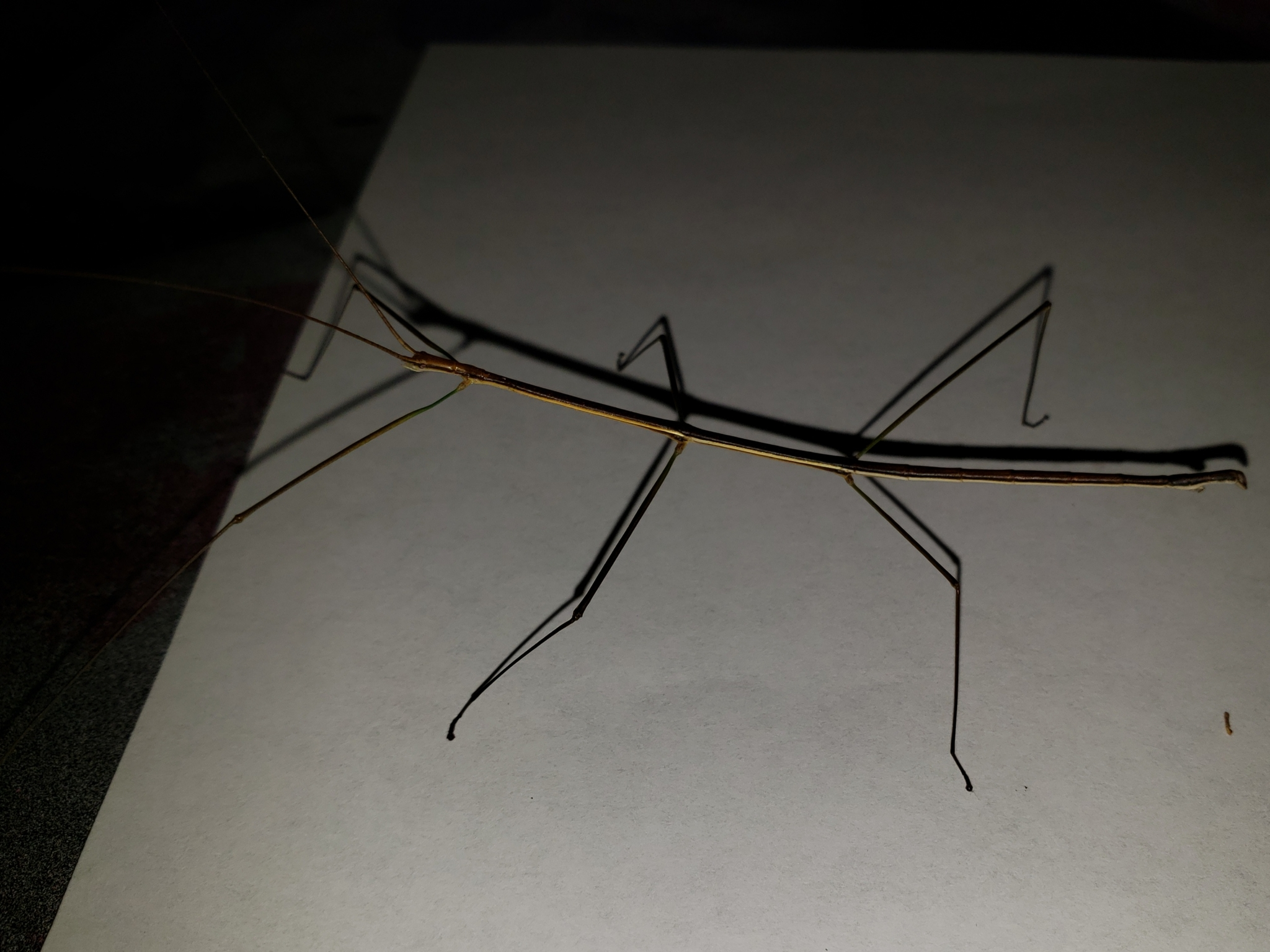

Scientific classification
- Domain: Eukaryota
- Kingdom: Animalia
- Phylum: Arthropoda
- Class: Insecta
- Order: Phasmatodea
- Family: Diapheromeridae
- Genus: Manomera
- Species: M. tenuescens

Binomial name
- Manomera tenuescens (Scudder, 1900)

= Manomera tenuescens =

Species of insect

Manomera tenuescens, the slender-bodied walkingstick, is a species of walkingstick in the family Diapheromeridae. It is found in North America.
