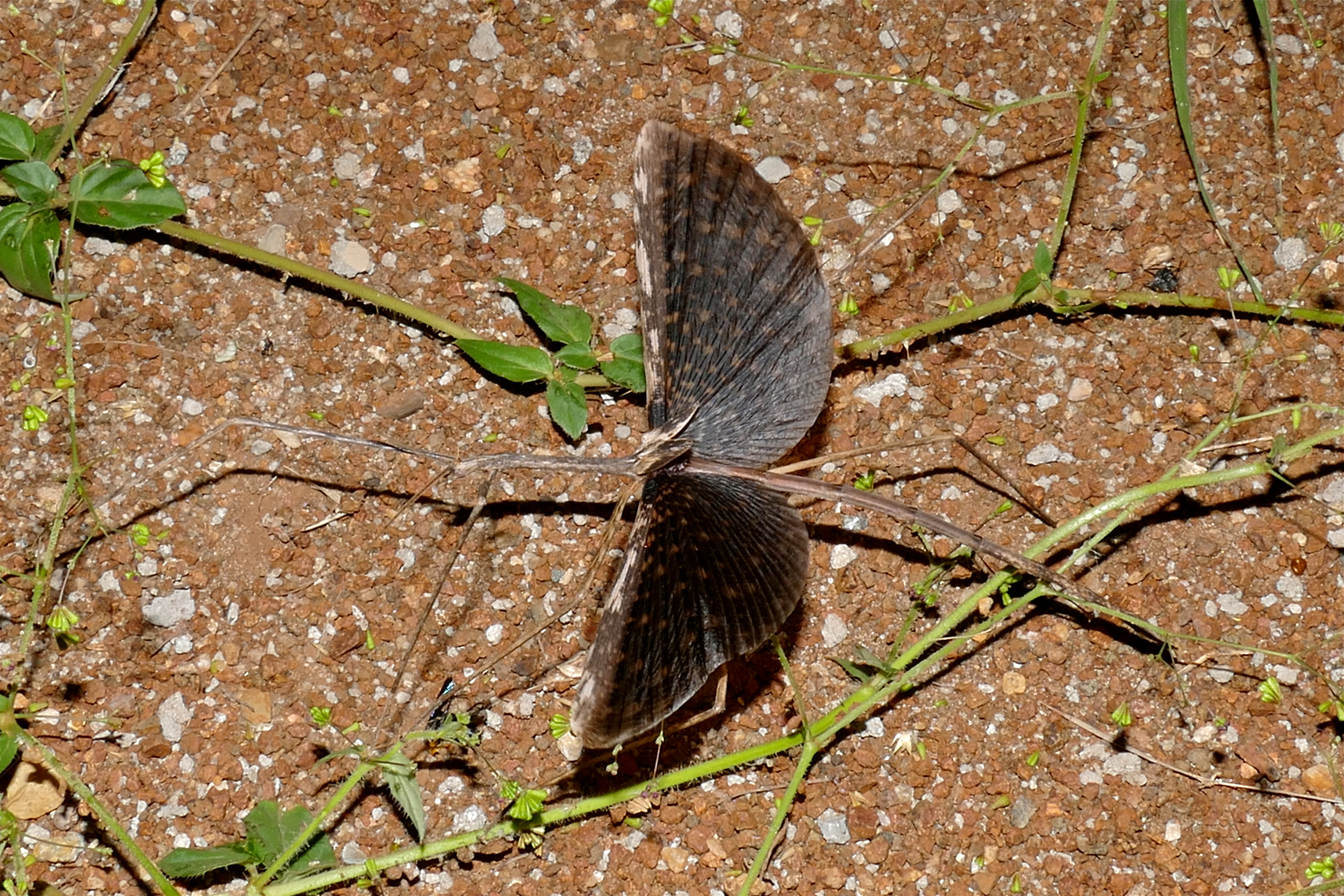
- Wing flashing

Scientific classification
- Kingdom: Animalia
- Phylum: Arthropoda
- Class: Insecta
- Order: Phasmatodea
- Family: Diapheromeridae
- Genus: Bactrododema
- Species: B. tiaratum

Binomial name
- Bactrododema tiaratum Stål, 1858

= Bactrododema tiaratum =

Species of stick insect

Bactrododema tiaratum, the tiara giant stick insect, is a species of stick insect in the family Diapheromeridae.

The species is found in southern Africa, including Botswana, Eswatini, Lesotho, Namibia, South Africa and Zimbabwe.
