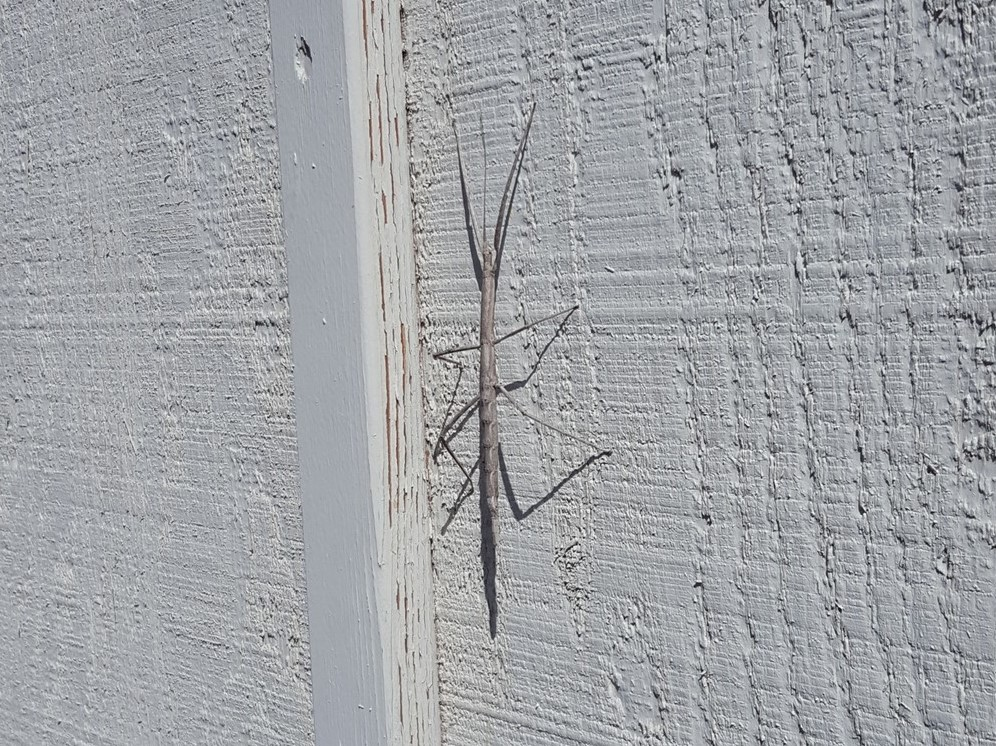

Scientific classification
- Domain: Eukaryota
- Kingdom: Animalia
- Phylum: Arthropoda
- Class: Insecta
- Order: Phasmatodea
- Family: Diapheromeridae
- Genus: Pseudosermyle
- Species: P. catalinae

Binomial name
- Pseudosermyle catalinae Rentz & Weissman, 1981

= Pseudosermyle catalinae =

Species of insect

Pseudosermyle catalinae, the Catalina walkingstick, is a species of walkingstick in the family Diapheromeridae. It is found in North America.
