= Libethra =

Libethra may refer to:

- Leibethra, an ancient Macedonian city
- Libethra (insect) Stål, 1875, a genus of stick insects in the family Diapheromeridae
- Libethra (moth) Saalmüller, 1884, a genus of moths in the family Lasiocampidae
