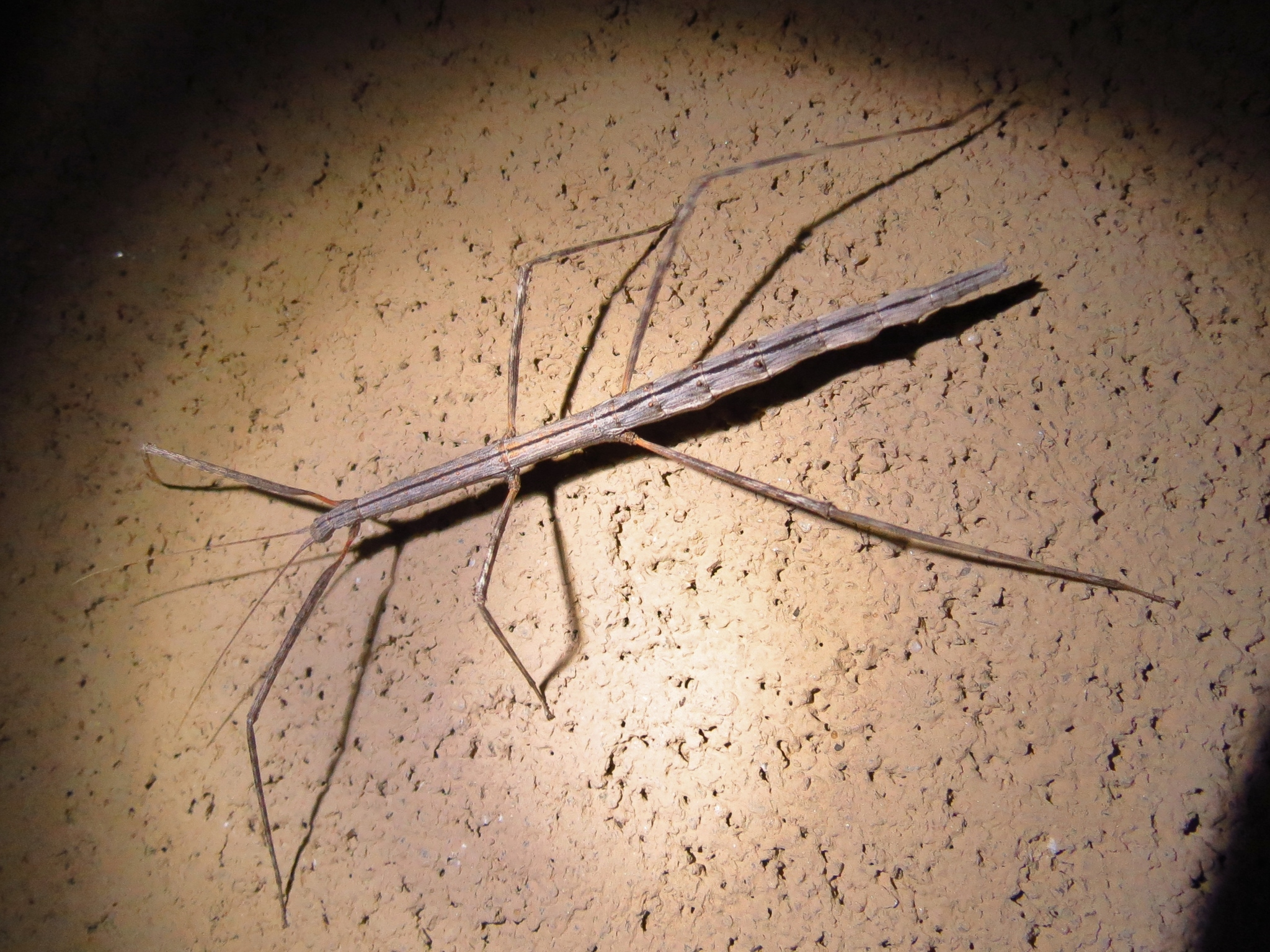

Scientific classification
- Domain: Eukaryota
- Kingdom: Animalia
- Phylum: Arthropoda
- Class: Insecta
- Order: Phasmatodea
- Family: Diapheromeridae
- Genus: Pseudosermyle
- Species: P. strigata

Binomial name
- Pseudosermyle strigata (Scudder, 1900)

= Pseudosermyle strigata =

Species of insect

Pseudosermyle strigata, the striped walkingstick, is a species of walkingstick in the family Diapheromeridae. It is found in North America.
