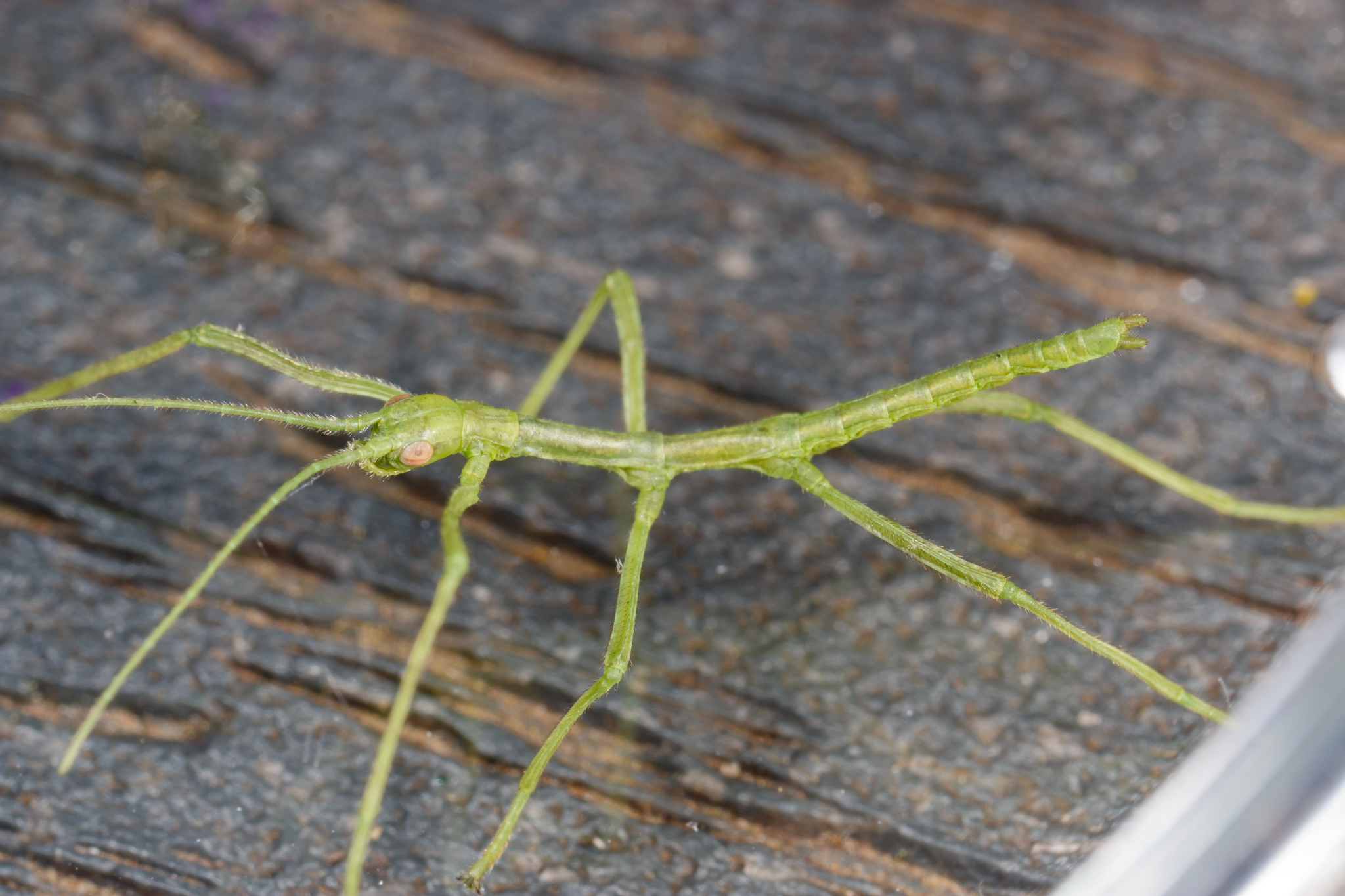

Scientific classification
- Kingdom: Animalia
- Phylum: Arthropoda
- Clade: Pancrustacea
- Class: Insecta
- Order: Phasmatodea
- Family: Diapheromeridae
- Subfamily: Diapheromerinae
- Genus: Megaphasma
- Species: M. denticrus

Binomial name
- Megaphasma denticrus (Stål, 1875)

= Megaphasma denticrus =

Species of insect

Megaphasma denticrus, the giant walkingstick, is a species of phasmid or stick insect in the family Diapheromeridae. They inhabit a range spanning wooded areas of Texas, Oklahoma, and parts of Mexico.

== Description ==
It is the largest insect in North America, growing up to 7 inches in length. Giant walkingsticks exhibit sexual dimorphism, with females generally being significantly larger than males. Giant walkingsticks have spines on their middle and hind legs; males have only a single, larger spine on each hind leg. Giant walkingsticks vary in color from shades of green to brown. Males also tend to be more brightly colored than females.

== Distribution ==
The giant walkingstick can be found as far east as Indiana, Alabama, and Kentucky; north to Wisconsin; west to New Mexico; and south to Mexico. However, they can be found most commonly in wooded areas of Texas, Oklahoma, and parts of Mexico.

== Ecology ==
Giant walkingsticks' preferred habitat and diet includes grass, grapevines, oak trees, elms, and mesquites.. The insects eat the foliage of these plants, and use camouflage to blend into the woody parts of their habitat.. Some evidence from captive rearing suggests that dietary preferences of this species changes as the insects develop, with younger nymphs preferring plants found in understory growth and adults preferring food plants which grow taller. Unusually large groups of this species were observed in June 1981 and June 2000 in Texas, though an exact cause of these groupings has not been determined.

== Reproduction ==
This species can reproduce sexually or asexually. Research suggests that sexually reproducing females lay more eggs than their asexual counterparts, although this pattern only seems to emerge among older individuals. The resulting ploidy of asexual reproduction is not well understood in this species. The incubation period of this species is not well understood. While some researchers have found that the incubation period of this species could be as long as two years, amateur naturalists rearing this species report an egg incubation period of approximately 10 months. Despite this long incubation period, adults of this species only have a lifespan of approximately 50 days.

Individual females of this species also commonly exhibit polygyny.

== Taxonomy ==
The holotype of this species was described by Carl Stål in 1875 in Louisiana, and is now stored in the Swedish Museum of Natural History. The name "denticrus" is derived from the latin "den" (tooth) and "crus" (leg), a reference to the spikes under the species' mesofemur.
