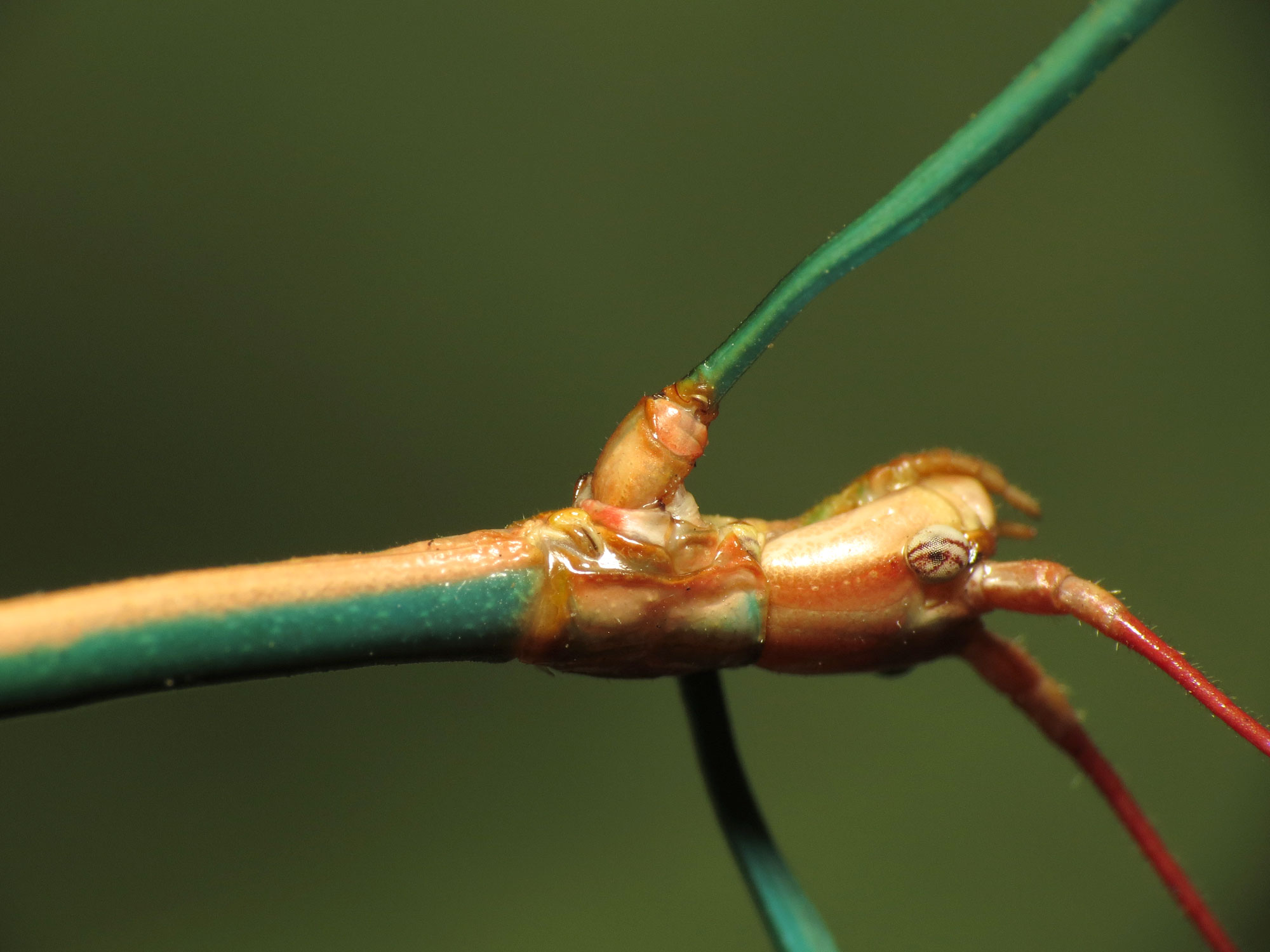
- Diapheromera arizonensis

Scientific classification
- Domain: Eukaryota
- Kingdom: Animalia
- Phylum: Arthropoda
- Class: Insecta
- Order: Phasmatodea
- Family: Diapheromeridae
- Subfamily: Diapheromerinae
- Genus: Diapheromera; Gray, 1835

= Diapheromera =

Genus of stick insects

Diapheromera is a genus of stick insects in the family Diapheromeridae. There are about 14 described species in Diapheromera.

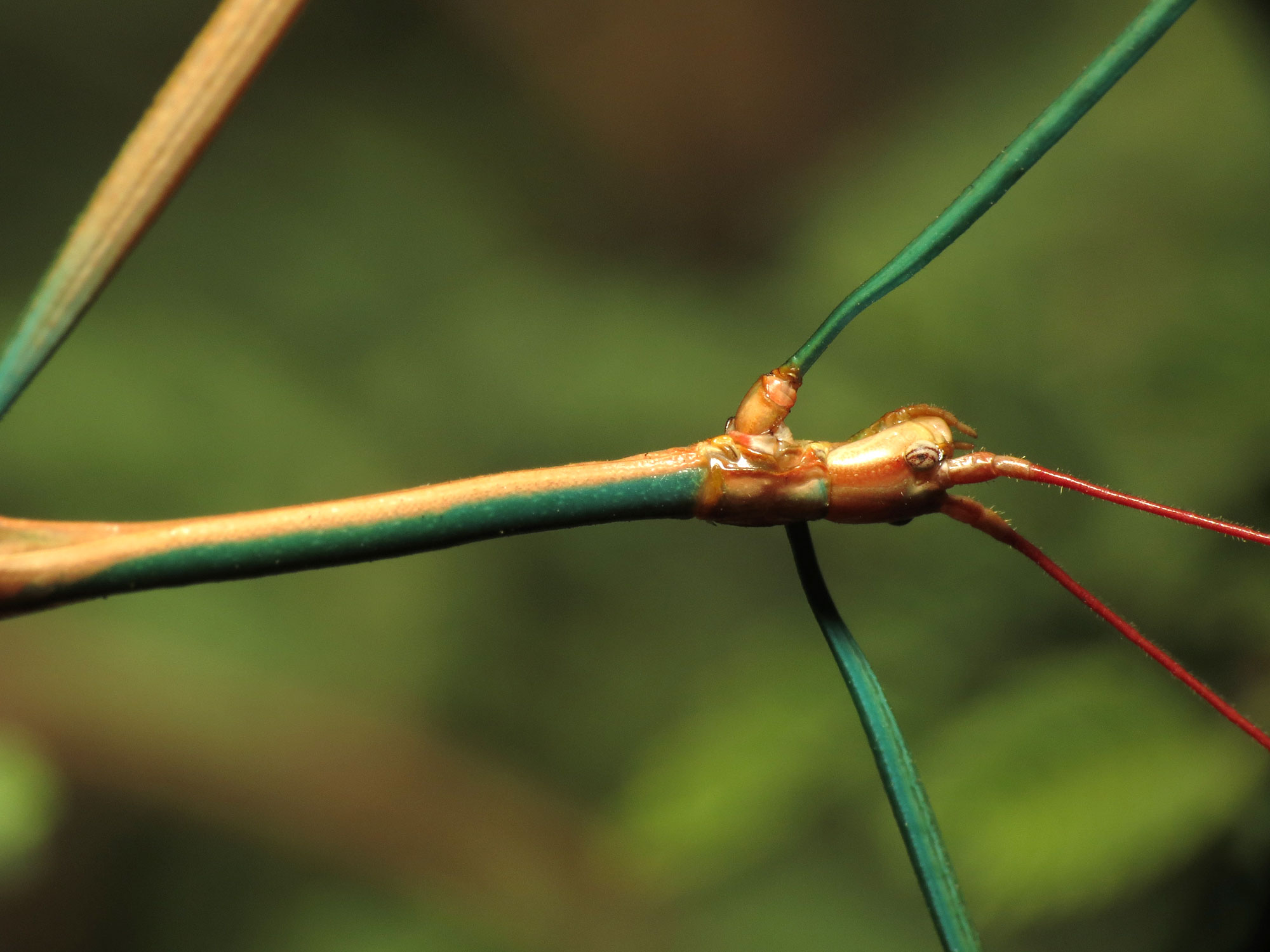
Diapheromera arizonensis

== Species ==
These 14 species belong to the genus Diapheromera.

- Diapheromera arizonensis Caudell, 1903 (Arizona walkingstick)
- Diapheromera beckeri Kaup, 1871
- Diapheromera calcarata (Burmeister, 1838)
- Diapheromera carolina Scudder, 1901 (Carolina walkingstick)
- Diapheromera covilleae Rehn & Hebard, 1909 (creosote bush walkingstick)
- Diapheromera erythropleura Hebard, 1923
- Diapheromera femorata (Say, 1824) (northern walkingstick)
- Diapheromera kevani Vickery, 1997
- Diapheromera nitens Brunner von Wattenwyl, 1907
- Diapheromera persimilis Caudell, 1904 (similar walkingstick)
- Diapheromera petita Vickery, 1997
- Diapheromera tamaulipensis Rehn, J.A.G., 1909 (tamaulipan walkingstick)
- Diapheromera torquata Hebard, 1934
- Diapheromera velii Walsh, 1864 (prairie walkingstick)
