= Oncotophasma =

Scientific classification
- Domain: Eukaryota
- Kingdom: Animalia
- Phylum: Arthropoda
- Class: Insecta
- Order: Phasmatodea
- Family: Diapheromeridae
- Tribe: Diapheromerini
- Genus: Oncotophasma; Rehn, 1904

Genus of insects

Oncotophasma is a Neotropical genus of Phasmatodea in the Diapheromeridae family. The genus was created by James Abram Garfield Rehn in 1904 and differentiated from the related genus Bostra on the basis of males having hind femur bearing spines and mid femur bearing two spines at the apex.

== Species ==
The genus Oncotophasma consists of the following species known from Central and South America:

- Oncotophasma armatum (Brunner von Wattenwyl, 1907)
- Oncotophasma coxatum (Brunner von Wattenwyl, 1907)
- Oncotophasma limonense (Zompro, 2007)
- Oncotophasma maculosum (Zompro, 2007)
- Oncotophasma martini (Griffini, 1896)
- Oncotophasma modestum (Brunner von Wattenwyl, 1907)
- Oncotophasma podagricum (Stål, 1875)
- Oncotophasma weitschati (Zompro, 2007)
