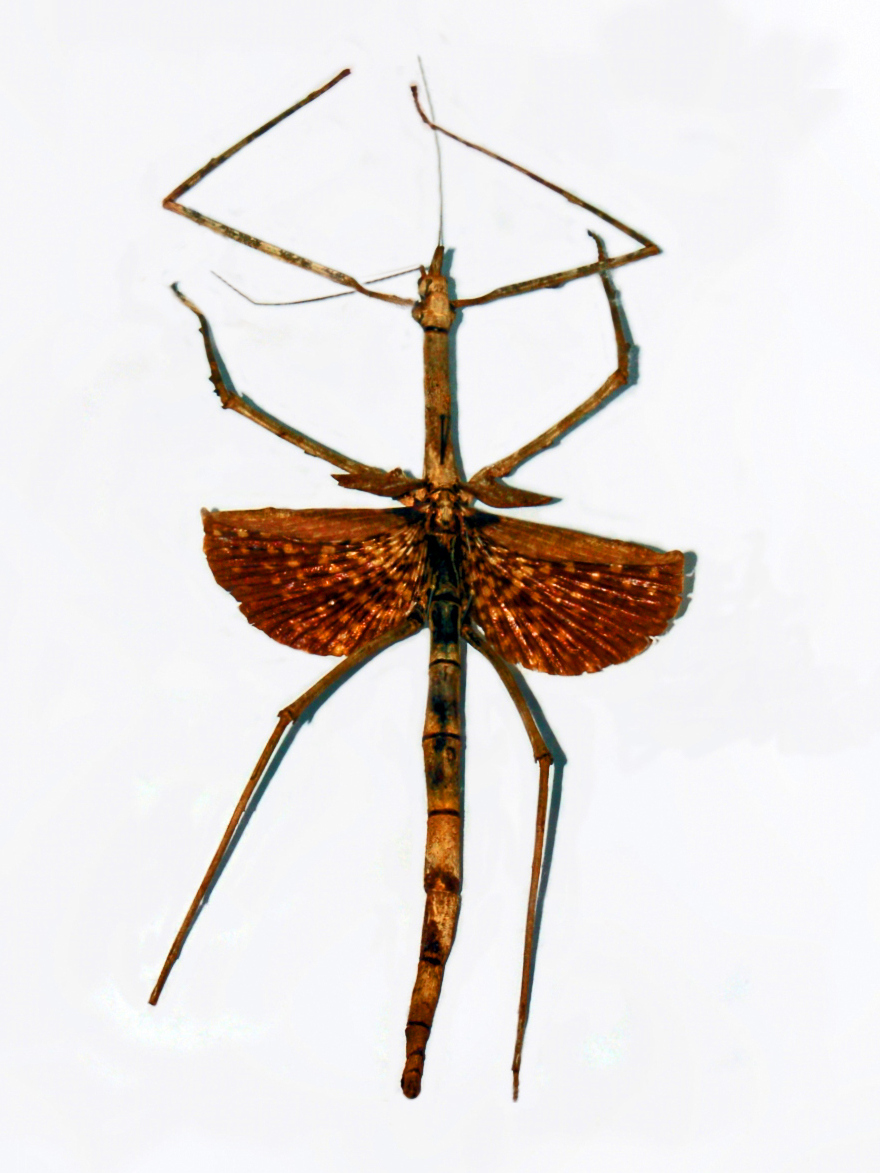
- Bactrododema species

Scientific classification
- Kingdom: Animalia
- Phylum: Arthropoda
- Clade: Pancrustacea
- Class: Insecta
- Order: Phasmatodea
- Family: Diapheromeridae
- Subfamily: Palophinae; Kirby, 1896

Synonyms
- Palophini

= Palophinae =

Subfamily of stick insects

Palophinae is a subfamily of the stick insect family Diapheromeridae. They belong to the superfamily Anareolatae of suborder Verophasmatodea.

Altogether about 20 species of Palophinae are known to date. They have a relictual distribution and are endemic to the southern Africa, with one occurring as far north as the Gulf of Guinea.

== Systematics ==
This is the smallest and least diverse of the Diapheromeridae subfamilies. Sometimes this subfamily is held to contain a single tribe Palophini, but this is redundant as long as no basal members of this lineage are known e.g. as fossils. Of its mere two genera, one is fairly speciose (with new species still being discovered), but the other is monotypic.

The genera are:

- Bactrododema Stål, 1858 (including Palophus)
- Dematobactron Karny, 1923
