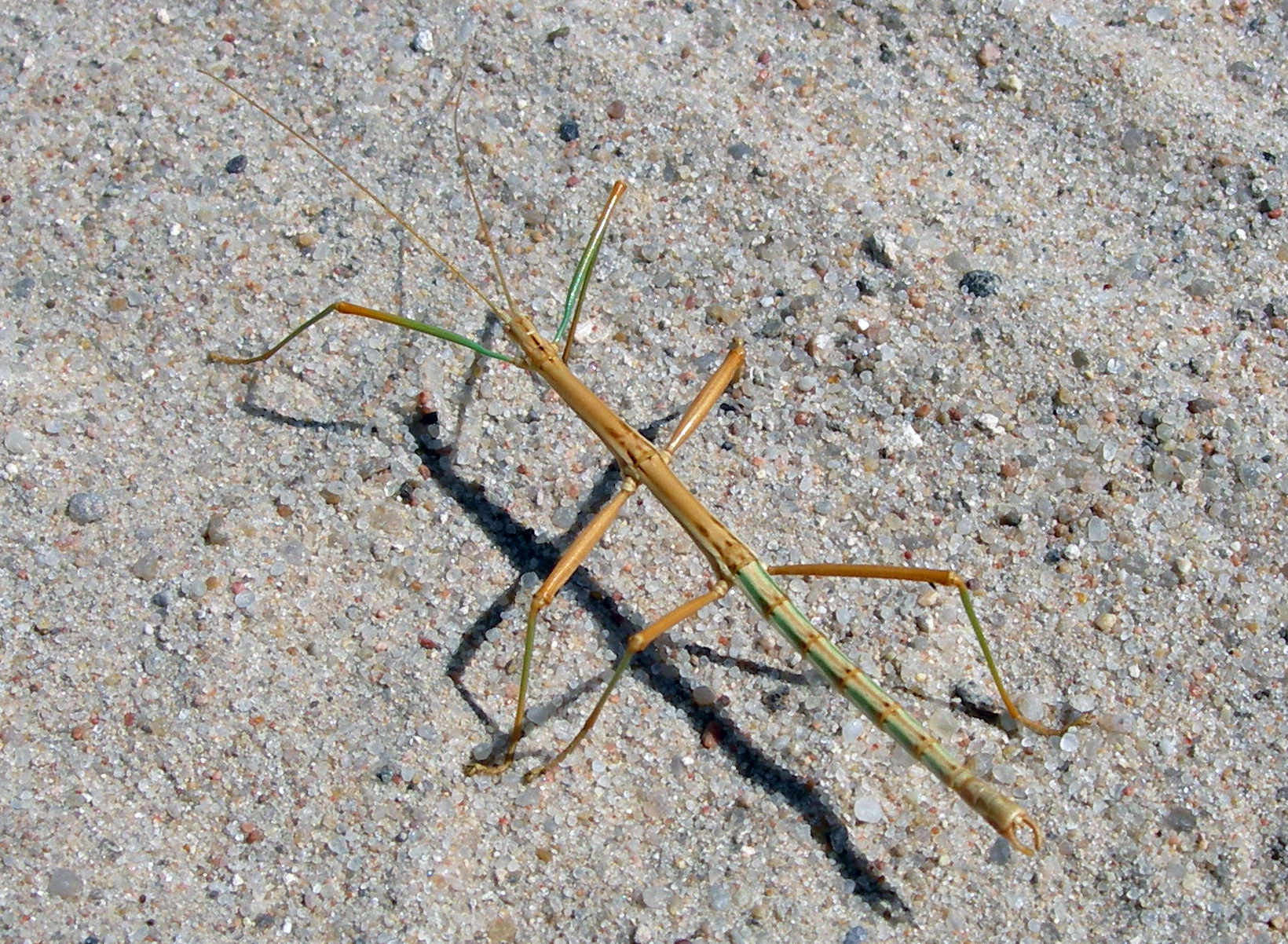

Scientific classification
- Domain: Eukaryota
- Kingdom: Animalia
- Phylum: Arthropoda
- Class: Insecta
- Order: Phasmatodea
- Family: Diapheromeridae
- Genus: Diapheromera
- Species: D. velii

Binomial name
- Diapheromera velii Walsh, 1864

= Diapheromera velii =

Species of insect

Diapheromera velii, the prairie walkingstick, is a species of walkingstick in the family Diapheromeridae. It is found in North America.

== Subspecies ==
These two subspecies belong to the species Diapheromera velii:

- Diapheromera velii eucnemis Hebard, 1937^{i c g}
- Diapheromera velii velii Walsh, 1864^{i c g}

Data sources: i = ITIS, c = Catalogue of Life, g = GBIF, b = Bugguide.net
