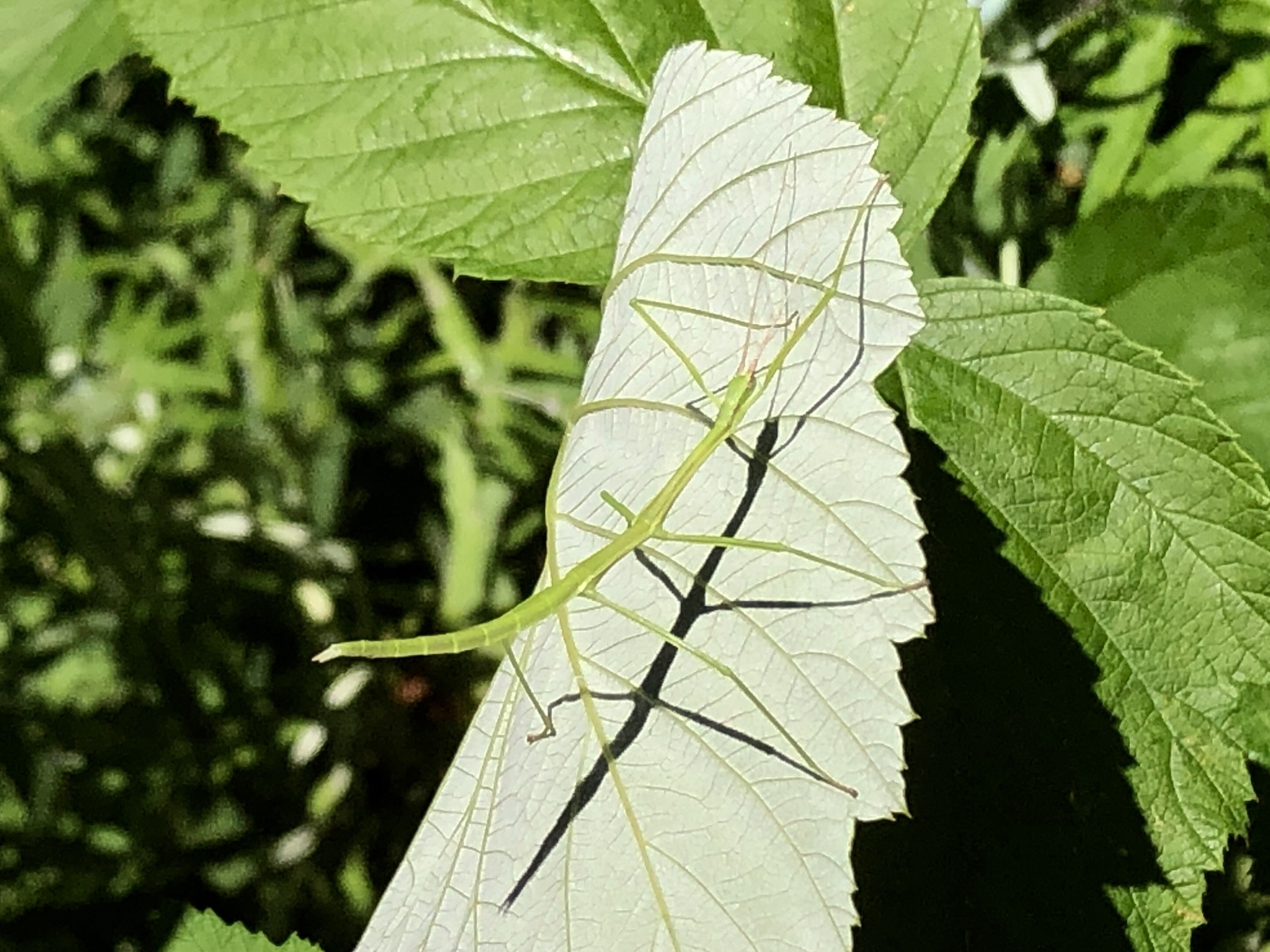

Scientific classification
- Domain: Eukaryota
- Kingdom: Animalia
- Phylum: Arthropoda
- Class: Insecta
- Order: Phasmatodea
- Family: Diapheromeridae
- Genus: Manomera
- Species: M. blatchleyi

Binomial name
- Manomera blatchleyi (Caudell, 1905)

= Manomera blatchleyi =

Species of insect

Manomera blatchleyi, the blatchley walkingstick, is a species of stick insect in the family Diapheromeridae. It is found in North America.

== Subspecies ==
These two subspecies belong to the species Manomera blatchleyi:

- Manomera blatchleyi atlantica Davis, 1923
- Manomera blatchleyi blatchleyi (Caudell, 1905)
