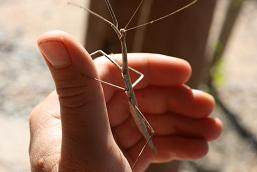
- In Sonora, Mexico

Scientific classification
- Kingdom: Animalia
- Phylum: Arthropoda
- Clade: Pancrustacea
- Class: Insecta
- Order: Phasmatodea
- Family: Diapheromeridae
- Genus: Diapheromera
- Species: D. covilleae

Binomial name
- Diapheromera covilleae Rehn and Hebard, 1909

= Diapheromera covilleae =

Species of stick insect

Diapheromera covilleae, the creosote bush walkingstick, is a species of stick insect in the family Diapheromeridae. They are about 5 to 10 centimetres (2.0 to 3.9 in) long depending on the sex, with large tarsal hooks at the end of each leg for superior grip to branches or other objects. They have small eyes and horn-like spines on the head and anus. Since they do not have wings, they travel by walking along branches of trees and bushes, sometimes walking along the ground in search for the next perch or food source. Females are usually 3 to 4 centimetres (1.2 to 1.6 in) longer than males and have a larger body. Females are also grey in color while males are more brown.

Creosote bush walkingsticks are herbivores, feeding on creosote bush leaves, chunari leaves, and various other plants. Common predators of the walkingsticks include birds and lizards. Creosote bush walkingsticks are fairly common, but because they are nocturnal and very well camouflaged, they are hard to spot. They inhabit deserts and cactus forests. They are found in the Sonoran Desert, which extends throughout much of the Southwestern United States and Northwestern Mexico.

== Other information ==
The creosote bush walkingstick only moves and feeds at night. It has four mandibles in front of its compound eyes that can grab and chew leaves while still giving the insect perfect vision of its surroundings. The antennae can reach up to 6 centimetres (2.4 in) long and are used to sense prey, food, and nearby mates.
