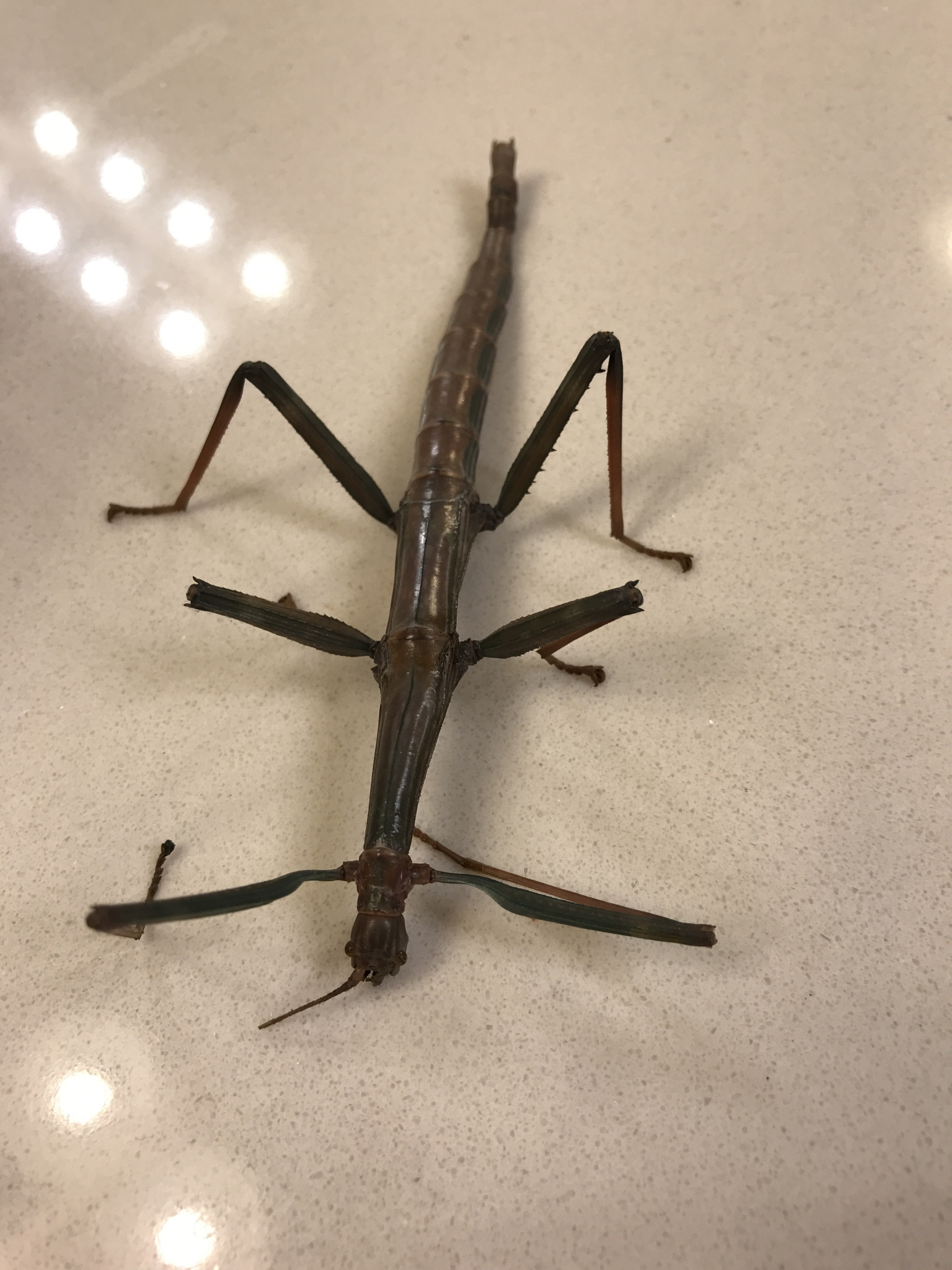
- Megaphasma denticrus

Scientific classification
- Domain: Eukaryota
- Kingdom: Animalia
- Phylum: Arthropoda
- Class: Insecta
- Order: Phasmatodea
- Family: Diapheromeridae
- Subfamily: Diapheromerinae
- Genus: Megaphasma; Caudell, 1903

= Megaphasma =

Genus of insects

Megaphasma is a genus of walking sticks in the family Diapheromeridae. There are at least two described species in Megaphasma.

== Species ==
These two species belong to the genus Megaphasma:

- Megaphasma denticrus (Stål, 1875) (giant walkingstick)
- Megaphasma furcatum (Brunner von Wattenwyl, 1907)
