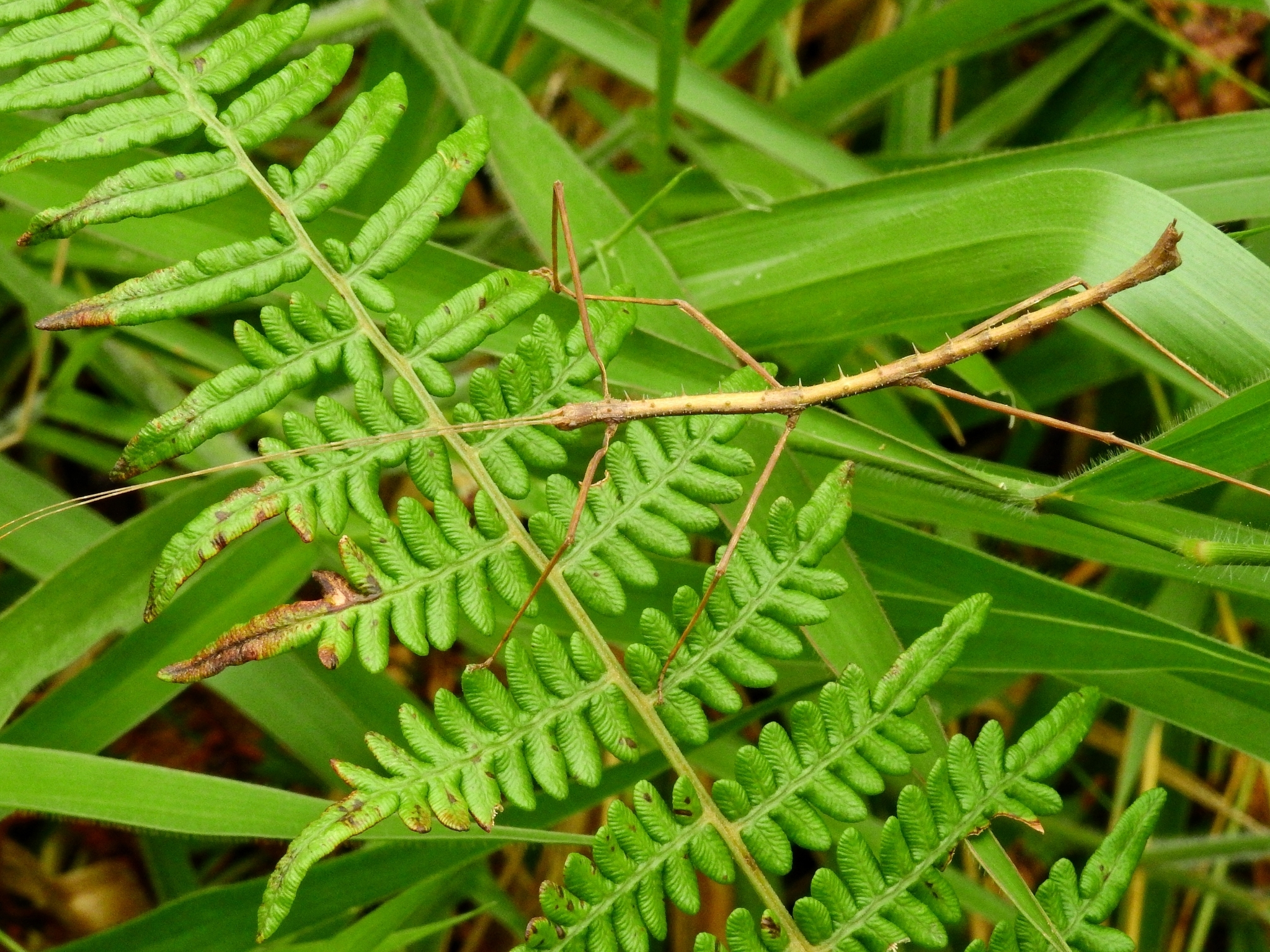
- Dyme ramulus, Ecuador

Scientific classification
- Kingdom: Animalia
- Phylum: Arthropoda
- Clade: Pancrustacea
- Class: Insecta
- Order: Phasmatodea
- Family: Diapheromeridae
- Subfamily: Diapheromerinae
- Tribe: Diapheromerini
- Genus: Dyme; Stål, 1875

= Dyme (insect) =

Genus of stick insects

Dyme is a genus of common walking stick insects in the family Diapheromeridae. There are about 10 described species in Dyme, found in South America.

== Species ==
These 10 species belong to the genus Dyme:

- Dyme annulicornis Hebard, 1924
- Dyme atropurpurea Carl, 1913
- Dyme bifrons Stål, 1875 (lobed Peruvian stick-insect)
- Dyme boliviana (Piza, 1939)
- Dyme cyphus (Westwood, 1859)
- Dyme mamillata Brunner von Wattenwyl, 1907
- Dyme palmes (Giglio-Tos, 1898)
- Dyme rarospinosa Brunner von Wattenwyl, 1907 (rarely spined Peruvian stick insect)
- Dyme spinicollis Conle, Hennemann & Gutiérrez, 2011
- Dyme tacanae Conle, Hennemann & Gutiérrez, 2011
