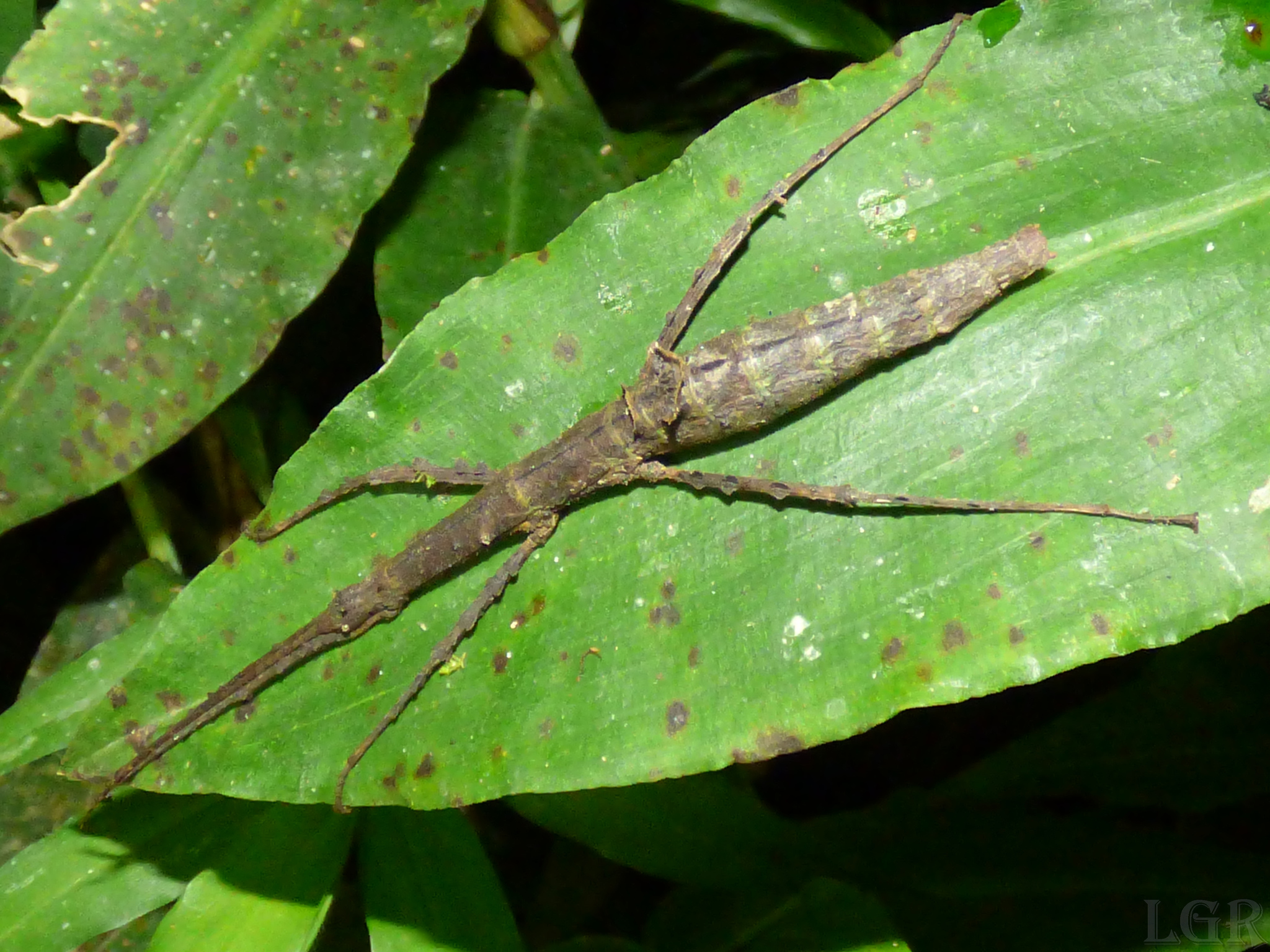
- Libethra rabdota, Colombia

Scientific classification
- Kingdom: Animalia
- Phylum: Arthropoda
- Clade: Pancrustacea
- Class: Insecta
- Order: Phasmatodea
- Family: Diapheromeridae
- Subfamily: Diapheromerinae
- Tribe: Diapheromerini
- Genus: Libethra; Stål, 1875

Synonyms
- Caulonia Stål, 1875; Ceroys Saussure, 1872; Rugosolibethra Zompro, 2001

= Libethra (insect) =

Genus of stick insects

Libethra is a genus of stick insects in the family Diapheromeridae. There are more than 30 described species in Libethra, found in the Neotropics.

== Species ==
These 35 species belong to the genus Libethra:

- Libethra armata Conle, Hennemann & Gutiérrez, 2011
- Libethra bifolia (Stål, 1875)
- Libethra brevipes Brunner von Wattenwyl, 1907
- Libethra chocoense Conle, Hennemann & Gutiérrez, 2011
- Libethra columbina (Westwood, 1859)
- Libethra crassespinosa Brunner von Wattenwyl, 1907
- Libethra gallegoi Conle, Hennemann & Gutiérrez, 2011
- Libethra huilaense Conle, Hennemann & Gutiérrez, 2011
- Libethra imbellis (Brunner von Wattenwyl, 1907)
- Libethra inchoata Brunner von Wattenwyl, 1907
- Libethra insalubris Hebard, 1919
- Libethra madrigali Conle, Hennemann & Gutiérrez, 2011
- Libethra metae Hebard, 1933
- Libethra minuscula Rehn, 1953
- Libethra molita (Westwood, 1859)
- Libethra nigripes Conle, Hennemann & Gutiérrez, 2011
- Libethra nisseri Stål, 1875
- Libethra panamae Hebard, 1923
- Libethra pumila Conle, Hennemann & Gutiérrez, 2011
- Libethra rabdota (Westwood, 1859)
- Libethra rioblanco Gutiérrez-Valencia & Gutiérrez, 2017
- Libethra rollei Brunner von Wattenwyl, 1907
- Libethra rugosa Brunner von Wattenwyl, 1907
- Libethra santandera Conle, Hennemann & Gutiérrez, 2011
- Libethra sartoria Brunner von Wattenwyl, 1907
- Libethra socia Brunner von Wattenwyl, 1907
- Libethra spinicollis Hebard, 1919
- Libethra spinulosa Brunner von Wattenwyl, 1907
- Libethra strigiventris (Westwood, 1859)
- Libethra tenuis Günther, 1932
- Libethra triedrica (Bolívar, 1888)
- Libethra ucumariensis Gutiérrez-Valencia & Gutiérrez, 2017
- Libethra unidentata Brunner von Wattenwyl, 1907
- Libethra venezuelica Brunner von Wattenwyl, 1907
- Libethra zamorana (Giglio-Tos, 1910)
