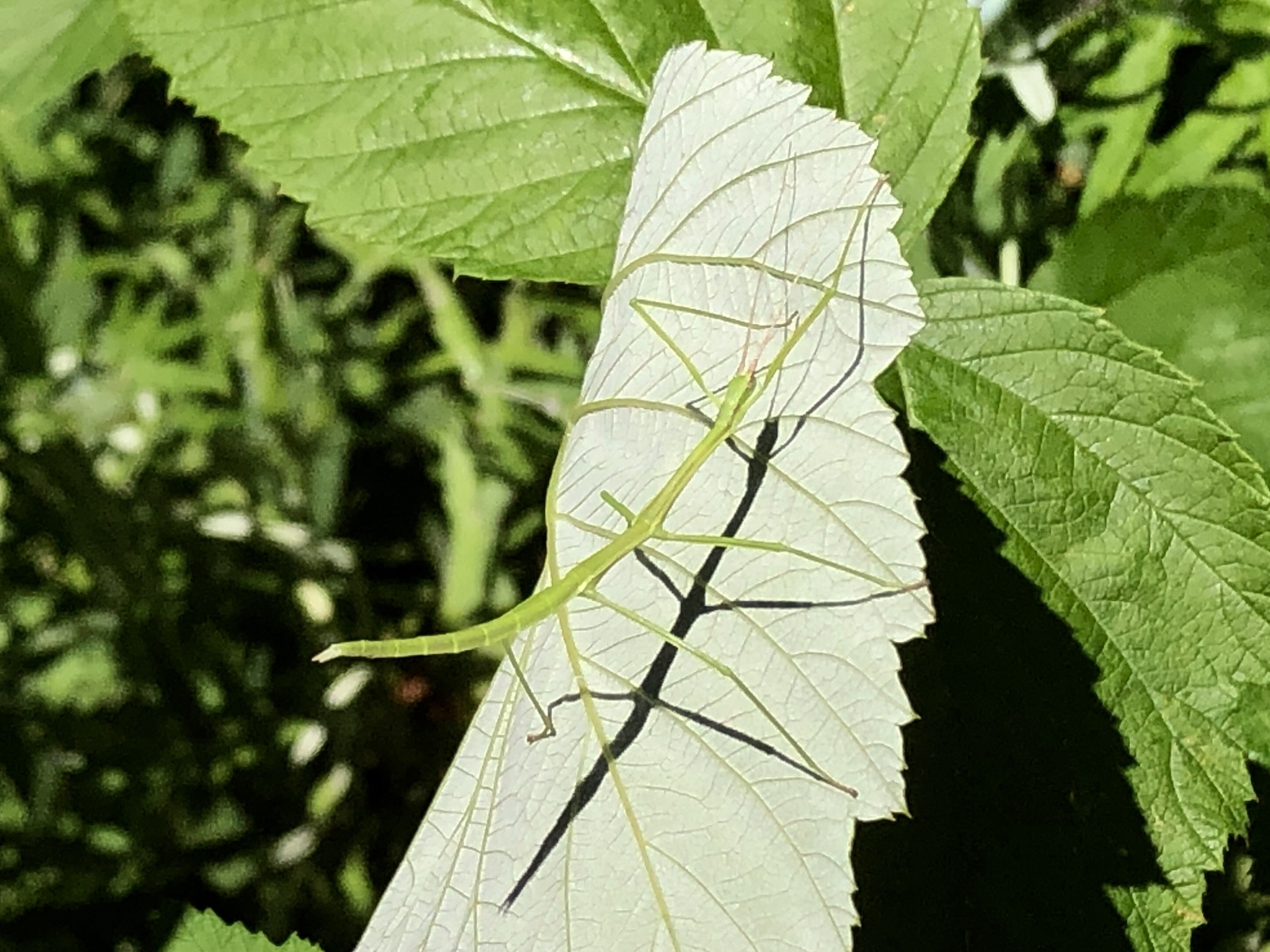
- Manomera blatchleyi

Scientific classification
- Domain: Eukaryota
- Kingdom: Animalia
- Phylum: Arthropoda
- Class: Insecta
- Order: Phasmatodea
- Infraorder: Anareolatae
- Family: Diapheromeridae
- Genus: Manomera; Rehn & Hebard, 1907

= Manomera =

Genus of insects

Manomera is a genus of walkingsticks in the family Diapheromeridae. There are at least three described species in Manomera.

== Species ==
These three species belong to the genus Manomera:

- Manomera blatchleyi (Caudell, 1905)^{i c g b} - blatchley walkingstick
- Manomera brachypyga Rehn and Hebard, 1914^{i c g}
- Manomera tenuescens (Scudder, 1900)^{i c g b} - slender-bodied walkingstick

Data sources: i = ITIS, c = Catalogue of Life, g = GBIF, b = Bugguide.net
