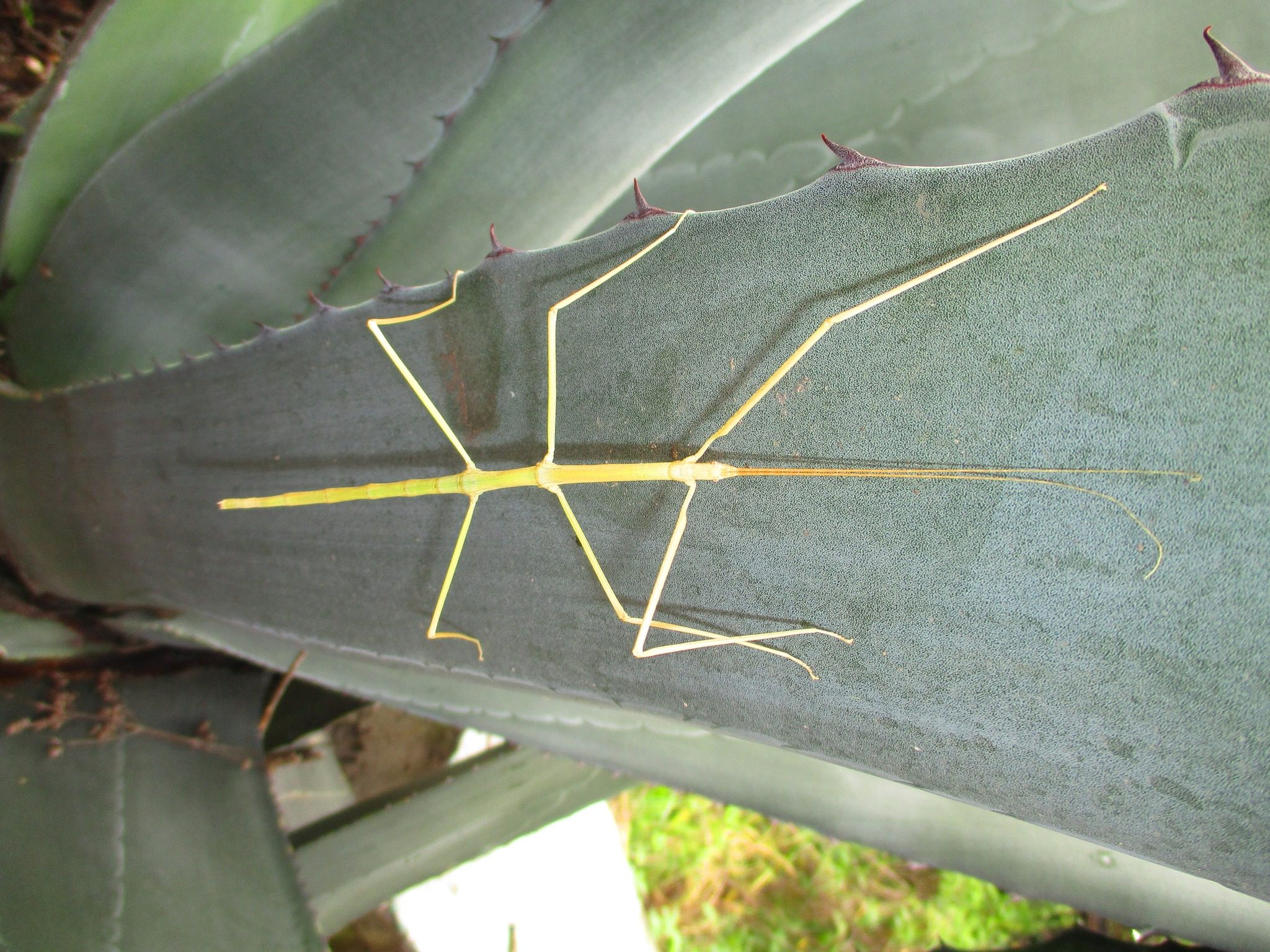
- Pseudosermyle strigiceps

Scientific classification
- Domain: Eukaryota
- Kingdom: Animalia
- Phylum: Arthropoda
- Class: Insecta
- Order: Phasmatodea
- Infraorder: Anareolatae
- Family: Diapheromeridae
- Genus: Pseudosermyle; Caudell, 1903

= Pseudosermyle =

Genus of insects

Pseudosermyle is a genus of walkingsticks in the family Diapheromeridae. There are more than 20 described species in Pseudosermyle.

== Species ==
These 26 species belong to the genus Pseudosermyle:

- Pseudosermyle arbuscula (Rehn, 1902)
- Pseudosermyle carinulata (Brunner von Wattenwyl, 1907)
- Pseudosermyle catalinae Rentz & Weissman, 1981 (Catalina walkingstick)
- Pseudosermyle chorreadero Conle, Hennemann & Fontana, 2007
- Pseudosermyle claviger Conle, Hennemann & Fontana, 2007
- Pseudosermyle elongata (Brunner von Wattenwyl, 1907)
- Pseudosermyle godmani (Brunner von Wattenwyl, 1907)
- Pseudosermyle guatemalae (Rehn, 1903)
- Pseudosermyle ignota (Brunner von Wattenwyl, 1907)
- Pseudosermyle incongruens (Brunner von Wattenwyl, 1907)
- Pseudosermyle inconspicua (Brunner von Wattenwyl, 1907)
- Pseudosermyle neptuna (Brunner von Wattenwyl, 1907)
- Pseudosermyle olmeca (Saussure, 1870–1872)
- Pseudosermyle parvula (Carl, 1913)
- Pseudosermyle phalangiphora (Rehn, 1907)
- Pseudosermyle physconia (Rehn, 1904)
- Pseudosermyle praetermissa (Brunner von Wattenwyl, 1907)
- Pseudosermyle procera Conle, Hennemann & Fontana, 2007
- Pseudosermyle straminea (Scudder, 1900)
- Pseudosermyle striatus (Burmeister, 1838)
- Pseudosermyle strigata (Scudder, 1900) (striped walkingstick)
- Pseudosermyle strigiceps (Kaup, 1871)
- Pseudosermyle tenuis Rehn & Hebard, 1909
- Pseudosermyle tolteca (Saussure, 1859)
- Pseudosermyle tridens (Burmeister, 1838)
- Pseudosermyle truncata Caudell, 1903
