= Ocnophila =

Scientific classification
- Domain: Eukaryota
- Kingdom: Animalia
- Phylum: Arthropoda
- Class: Insecta
- Order: Phasmatodea
- Family: Diapheromeridae
- Genus: Ocnophila; Brunner von Wattenwyl, 1907

Genus of insects

Ocnophila is a genus of insects belonging to the family Diapheromeridae.

The species of this genus are found in Central America.

Species:

- Ocnophila acanthonota Günther, 1930
- Ocnophila aculeata Brunner von Wattenwyl, 1907
- Ocnophila armata Brunner von Wattenwyl, 1907
