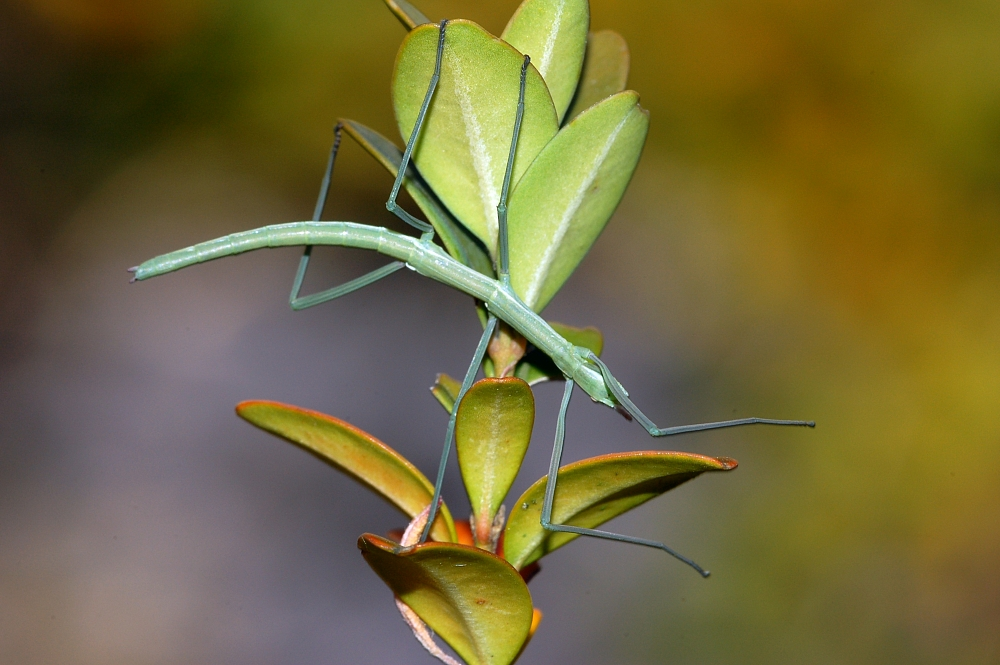
- Spanish walkingstick (Pijnackeria hispanica) (Pachymorphinae: Gratidiini)

Scientific classification
- Kingdom: Animalia
- Phylum: Arthropoda
- Clade: Pancrustacea
- Class: Insecta
- Order: Phasmatodea
- Infraorder: Anareolatae
- Family: Diapheromeridae; Kirby, 1904

Diversity
- 4 subfamilies (but see text)

= Diapheromeridae =

Family of stick insects

Diapheromeridae is a family of stick insects (order Phasmatodea) in the suborder Euphasmatodea. As of 2025, the exact position of Diapheromeridae within Euphasmatodea is unknown - it is considered incertae sedis and not assigned to any known superfamily.

The family contains some huge species, e.g. Paraphanocles keratosqueleton which can grow to over 30 cm long.

== Subfamilies ==
Diapheromeridae has two subfamilies, according to the Phasmida Species File. Palophinae, with only 2 genera and about 19 species, is the smallest subfamily by far and not particularly diverse. Diapheromerinae, on the other hand, has more than 400 species in 60 genera.

There were formerly two other subfamilies in Diapheromeridae, Lonchodinae and the Necrosciinae, which are currently placed in the family Lonchodidae.

The subfamilies of Diapheromeridae are now:

- Diapheromerinae
- Palophinae
