= Scionecra =

Scientific classification
- Domain: Eukaryota
- Kingdom: Animalia
- Phylum: Arthropoda
- Class: Insecta
- Order: Phasmatodea
- Family: Lonchodidae
- Subfamily: Necrosciinae
- Tribe: Necrosciini
- Genus: Scionecra; Karny, 1923

Genus of stick insects

External image
- Images at iNaturalist

Scionecra is a genus of Asian stick insects in the tribe Necrosciini, erected by Heinrich Hugo Karny in 1923. Species have been recorded from: China, Vietnam, Malesia through to Australia.

== Species ==
The Phasmida Species File lists:

1. Scionecra agrionina (Bates, 1865)
2. Scionecra agrionoides (Redtenbacher, 1908)
3. Scionecra clavigera (Redtenbacher, 1908)
4. Scionecra conspicua (Redtenbacher, 1908)
5. Scionecra falcata (Redtenbacher, 1908)
6. Scionecra flabellata (Redtenbacher, 1908)
7. Scionecra huai Ho, 2014
8. Scionecra jiewhoei Seow-Choen, 2017
9. Scionecra maculata Ho, 2014
10. Scionecra microptera (Redtenbacher, 1908)
11. Scionecra milledgei Hasenpusch & Brock, 2007
12. Scionecra osmylus (Westwood, 1859) - type species (as Necroscia osmylus Westwood)
13. Scionecra phonae Brock & Seow-Choen, 2021
14. Scionecra pseudocerca (Chen & He, 2008)
15. Scionecra queenslandica (Sjöstedt, 1918)
16. Scionecra refractaria (Redtenbacher, 1908)
17. Scionecra seriata (Redtenbacher, 1908)
18. Scionecra spinipennis (Redtenbacher, 1908)
19. Scionecra spinosa Ho, 2013
20. Scionecra truncata (Redtenbacher, 1908)
