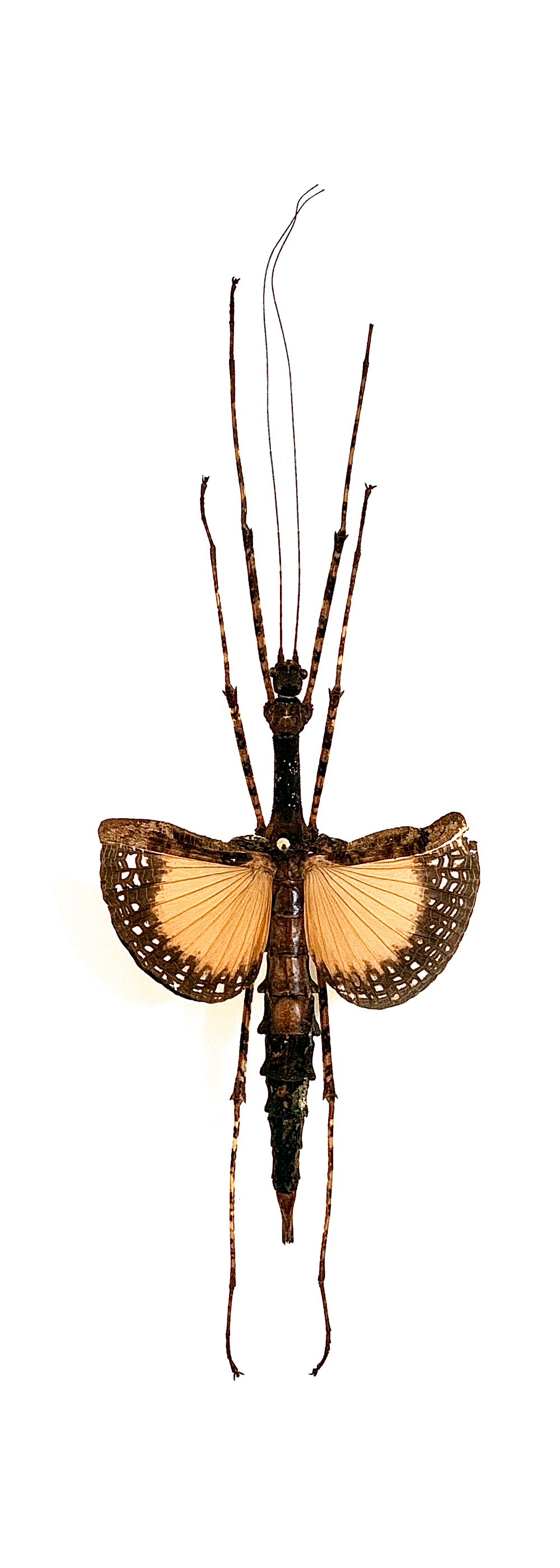
- Pseudodiacantha macklottii (female) specimen from the private collection of Andrew Markey

Scientific classification
- Domain: Eukaryota
- Kingdom: Animalia
- Phylum: Arthropoda
- Class: Insecta
- Order: Phasmatodea
- Family: Lonchodidae
- Subfamily: Necrosciinae
- Tribe: Necrosciini
- Genus: Pseudodiacantha
- Species: P. macklottii

Binomial name
- Pseudodiacantha macklottii (de Haan, 1842)

Synonyms
- Pseudodiacantha obscura Redtenbacher, 1908

= Pseudodiacantha macklottii =

Species of insect

Pseudodiacantha macklottii, formally Orxines macklottii, is a species of stick insect endemic to Java. It is better known as the Javanese Lichen Stick Insect due to their habit of covering their bodies with moss and lichens to supplement their disguise in the wild.

== Description ==
Females are sturdy, medium-sized, long-legged, and have a body length of about 70 mm (2.8 in). Males are much smaller, with a body length of about 50 mm (2.0 in). They are long-legged and slender and less contrasting than females. Both sexes have small bright orange wings, fringed with a black border and white dots, but lack flight capability.

== Captivity ==
The first culture of Pseudodiacantha macklottii was imported by a zoo in London in 1946 but the exact origin of this old culture is unknown. They are considered easy to breed. Common food plants accepted by both nymphs and adults include Corylus avellana and Rhododendron. Pseudodiacantha macklottii are active mainly during the night and when threatened, they release a distinctive odor.

== Gallery ==
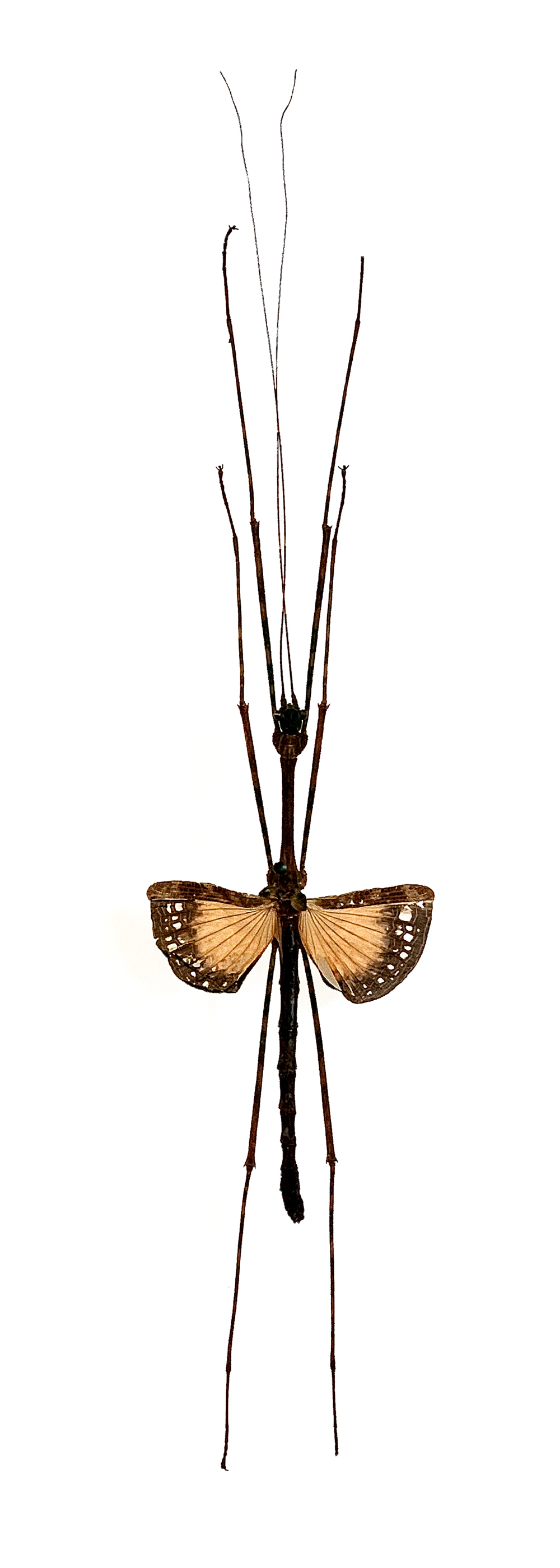
Adult male Pseudodiacantha macklottii specimen
