= Pomposa =

Pomposa may refer to:

- Pomposa Abbey
- Lido di Pomposa, an Italian seaside resort in the province of Ferrara
- Pomposa (phasmid), stick insect genus of the subfamily Necrosciinae
