= Planososibia =

Scientific classification
- Domain: Eukaryota
- Kingdom: Animalia
- Phylum: Arthropoda
- Class: Insecta
- Order: Phasmatodea
- Family: Lonchodidae
- Subfamily: Necrosciinae
- Tribe: Necrosciini
- Genus: Planososibia; Seow-Choen, 2016

Genus of Asian stick insects

External image
- Images at iNaturalist

Planososibia is a genus of Asian stick insects in the tribe Necrosciini, erected by Francis Seow-Choen in 2016. Species have been recorded from: Sri Lanka, Tibet, China, Vietnam and Malesia.

== Species ==
The Phasmida Species File lists:

1. Planososibia biaculeata (Redtenbacher, 1908)
2. Planososibia bimai Seow-Choen, 2020
3. Planososibia brevialata Ho, 2017
4. Planososibia chini Seow-Choen, 2021
5. Planososibia cornuta (Chen & He, 2008)
6. Planososibia cpae Seow-Choen, 2017
7. Planososibia emileenae Seow-Choen, 2017
8. Planososibia esacus (Westwood, 1859) - type species (as Necroscia esacus Westwood)
9. Planososibia humbertiana (Saussure, 1868)
10. Planososibia kotalensis Seow-Choen, 2017
11. Planososibia leusera Seow-Choen, 2018
12. Planososibia liui Ho, 2017
13. Planososibia lysippus (Westwood, 1859)
14. Planososibia nigricans (Redtenbacher, 1908)
15. Planososibia paraesalus (Redtenbacher, 1908)
16. Planososibia parvipennis (Stål, 1877)
17. Planososibia platycerca (Redtenbacher, 1908)
18. Planososibia qiongensis (Ho, 2013)
19. Planososibia siewtei Seow-Choen, 2017
20. Planososibia subulussalama Seow-Choen, 2018
21. Planososibia tommykohi Seow-Choen, 2017
22. Planososibia truncata (Chen & Chen, 2000)
23. Planososibia trusmadiensis Seow-Choen, 2017
24. Planososibia yunnana (Chen & He, 2008)
25. Planososibia zackyi Seow-Choen, 2018
