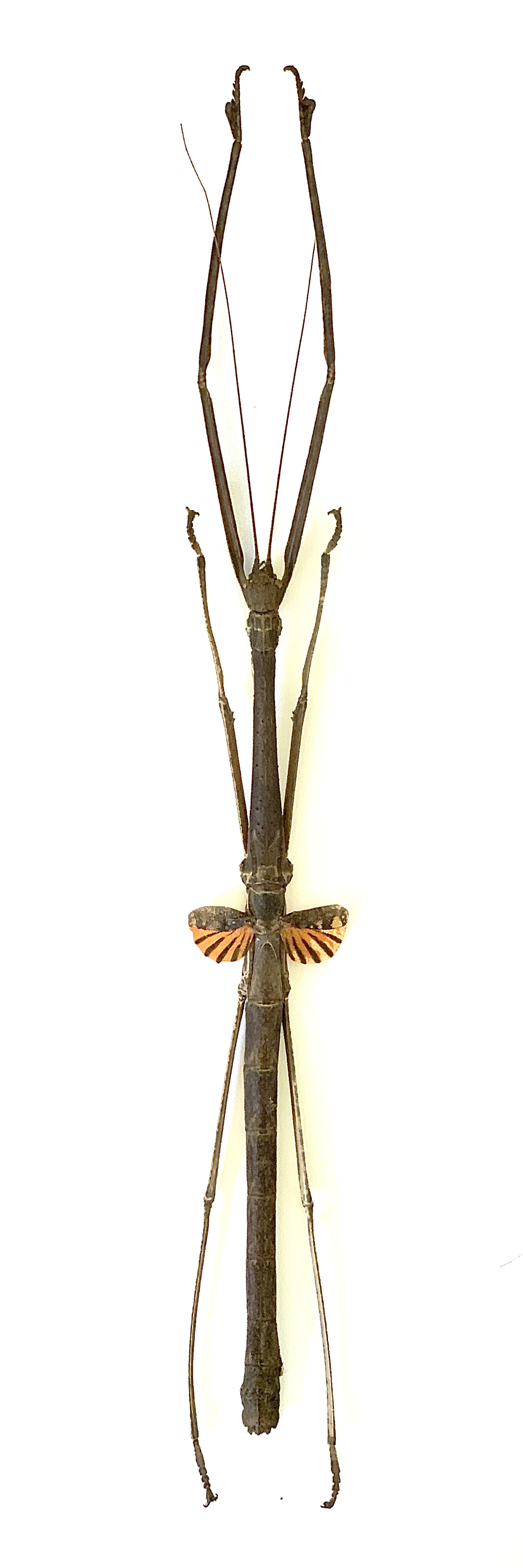
- Phaenopharos struthioneus specimen from the private collection of Andrew Markey

Scientific classification
- Domain: Eukaryota
- Kingdom: Animalia
- Phylum: Arthropoda
- Class: Insecta
- Order: Phasmatodea
- Family: Lonchodidae
- Subfamily: Necrosciinae
- Genus: Phaenopharos
- Species: P. struthioneus

Binomial name
- Phaenopharos struthioneus (Westwood, 1859)

Synonyms
- Diardia praestans (Redtenbacher, 1908); Candaules rex (Redtenbacher, 1908); Phaenopharos struthioneusumnst Seow-Choen, 1999

= Phaenopharos struthioneus =

Species of insect

Phaenopharos struthioneus, the small red winged stick insect, is a medium-sized stick insect found in Malaysia and Sumatra. This species is extinct in Singapore. Both males and females are known for their small red stubby wings, which are used solely for the purpose of displaying when threatened. Thus, they cannot fly.
