= Mycovartes =

Scientific classification
- Kingdom: Animalia
- Phylum: Arthropoda
- Clade: Pancrustacea
- Class: Insecta
- Order: Phasmatodea
- Family: Lonchodidae
- Subfamily: Necrosciinae
- Tribe: Necrosciini
- Genus: Mycovartes; Bresseel & Constant, 2024

Genus of stick insects

Mycovartes is a genus of Asian stick insects in the tribe Necrosciini, erected by Joachim Bresseel and Jérôme Constant in 2024. As of November 2026, species have only been found in Vietnam.

== Species ==
The Phasmida Species File includes:

1. Mycovartes khoii Bresseel & Constant, 2024 - from Chu Yang Sin and Tà Đùng National Parks
2. Mycovartes montanus Bresseel & Constant, 2024 - type species (by original designation), from Chu Yang Sin and Bidoup-Nui Ba National Parks
3. Mycovartes vietnamensis (Ho, 2018) - originally placed in Oxyartes
