= Parasinophasma =

Scientific classification
- Domain: Eukaryota
- Kingdom: Animalia
- Phylum: Arthropoda
- Class: Insecta
- Order: Phasmatodea
- Family: Lonchodidae
- Subfamily: Necrosciinae
- Tribe: Necrosciini
- Genus: Parasinophasma; Chen & He, 2006

Synonyms
- Euphasma Chen & He, 2001

Genus of stick insects

External image
- Image at iNaturalist

Parasinophasma is a genus of Asian stick insects in the tribe Necrosciini, erected by S.C. Chen and Y.H. He in 2006. Species have been recorded from: central-southern China (with records from Hong Kong) and Vietnam. At least two species, Parasinophasma laifanae and P. luchunense luchunense are known to be nocturnal.

== Species ==
The Phasmida Species File lists:

1. Parasinophasma bouvieri (Redtenbacher, 1908)
2. Parasinophasma bresseeli Ho, 2017
3. Parasinophasma constanti Ho, 2017
4. Parasinophasma fanjingshanense Chen & He, 2006
5. Parasinophasma guangdongense Chen & He, 2008
6. Parasinophasma hainanense Chen & He, 2008
7. Parasinophasma henanense (Bi & Wang, 1998) - type species (as Micadina henanensis Bi & Wang)
8. Parasinophasma laifanae Ho, 2017
9. Parasinophasma liui Ho, 2017
10. Parasinophasma luchunense Ho, 2017
11. Parasinophasma maculatum Ho, 2015
12. Parasinophasma sparsigranulatum Ho, 2017
13. Parasinophasma tianmushanense Ho, 2015
14. Parasinophasma unicolor Ho, 2015
