= Phamartes =

Scientific classification
- Domain: Eukaryota
- Kingdom: Animalia
- Phylum: Arthropoda
- Class: Insecta
- Order: Phasmatodea
- Family: Lonchodidae
- Subfamily: Necrosciinae
- Tribe: Necrosciini
- Genus: Phamartes; Bresseel & Constant, 2013

Genus of stick insects

External image
- Unconfirmed image at iNaturalist

Phamartes is a genus of Asian stick insects in the tribe Necrosciini identified by J Bresseel and J Constant in 2013. As of 2022, species have only been recorded as originating from Vietnam. The genus was named after the Prof. Thai Hong Pham of the Vietnam National Museum of Nature (Bảo tàng Thiên nhiên Việt Nam).

== Description ==
Bresseel and Constant noted that this genus is closely related to Oxyartes, but is "easily distinguishable by the presence of fully developed alae, or rounded apical tegmina, possibly with protruding humps (whereas all known Oxyartes species have only tiny wing buds), the head armature, and the split and asymmetrical anal segment, a character previously unknown in Necrosciinae".

== Species ==
The Phasmida Species File currently includes:

1. Phamartes coronatus Bresseel & Constant, 2013 - type species - locality Bạch Mã National Park
2. Phamartes elongatus Li & Bu, 2019 - locality Cát Tiên National Park
