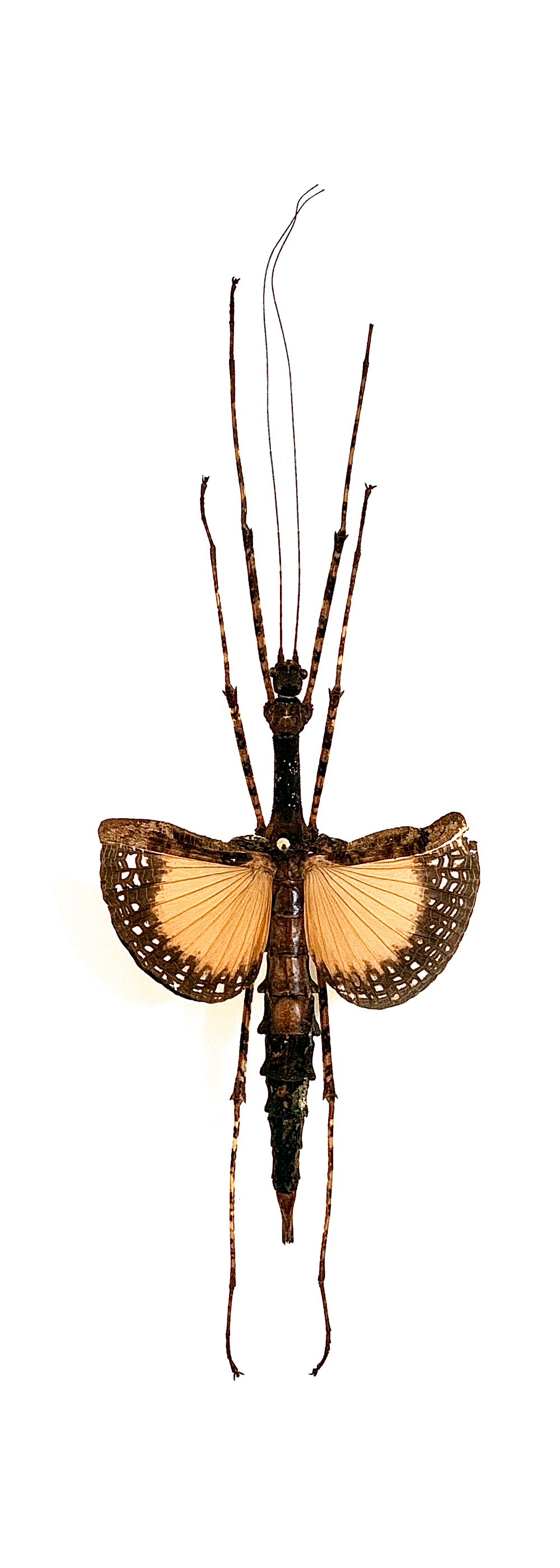
- Pseudodiacantha macklottii (female) specimen from the private collection of Andrew Markey

Scientific classification
- Domain: Eukaryota
- Kingdom: Animalia
- Phylum: Arthropoda
- Class: Insecta
- Order: Phasmatodea
- Family: Lonchodidae
- Subfamily: Necrosciinae
- Tribe: Necrosciini
- Genus: Pseudodiacantha; Redtenbacher, 1908

= Pseudodiacantha =

Genus of stick insects

Pseudodiacantha is an Asian genus of stick insects in the family Lonchodidae and subfamily Necrosciinae. Members of Pseudodiacantha are excellent examples of camouflage, as they are known to cover themselves in mossy or lichenous outgrowths that supplement their disguise.

== Species ==
The Phasmida Species File lists:

- Pseudodiacantha chieni Seow-Choen, 2019
- Pseudodiacantha macklottii (de Haan, 1842)
