= Thrasyllus macilentus =

Scientific classification
- Kingdom: Animalia
- Phylum: Arthropoda
- Clade: Pancrustacea
- Class: Insecta
- Order: Phasmatodea
- Family: Lonchodidae
- Subfamily: Necrosciinae
- Tribe: Necrosciini
- Genus: Thrasyllus; Stål, 1877
- Species: T. macilentus

Binomial name
- Thrasyllus macilentus Stål, 1877

Species of insect

Thrasyllus is a monotypic genus of phasmids belonging to the tribe Necrosciini. The only species is Thrasyllus macilentus.

The species is found in Philippines.
