= Dendrochroma =

Scientific classification
- Kingdom: Animalia
- Phylum: Arthropoda
- Clade: Pancrustacea
- Class: Insecta
- Order: Phasmatodea
- Family: Lonchodidae
- Subfamily: Necrosciinae
- Tribe: Necrosciini
- Genus: Dendrochroma; Bresseel, Constant, Cumming & Pham, 2025

Genus of stick insects

External image
- Image and observations at iNaturalist

Dendrochroma is a genus of Asian stick insects in the tribe Necrosciini, erected by J. Bresseel, J. Constant, R.T. Cumming and H.-T. Pham in 2025. Species have been recorded from Cambodia, Vietnam and Hainan Island (with two species previously placed in the genus Neoasceles).

== Species ==
The Phasmida Species File includes:

1. Dendrochroma bachmaense Bresseel, Constant, Cumming & Pham, 2025
2. Dendrochroma elongatum (Ho, 2024)
3. Dendrochroma hainanense (Chen & He, 2002)
4. Dendrochroma montanum Bresseel, Constant, Cumming & Pham, 2025
5. Dendrochroma tonkinense Bresseel, Constant, Cumming & Pham, 2025 - type species (by original designation)
6. Dendrochroma youngdalei Bresseel, Constant, Cumming & Pham, 2025
