= Nescicroa =

Scientific classification
- Kingdom: Animalia
- Phylum: Arthropoda
- Clade: Pancrustacea
- Class: Insecta
- Order: Phasmatodea
- Family: Lonchodidae
- Subfamily: Necrosciinae
- Tribe: Necrosciini
- Genus: Nescicroa; Karny, 1923

Genus of stick insects

External image
- Images at iNaturalist

Nescicroa is a genus of tropical Asian stick insects in the tribe Necrosciini, erected by H.H. Karny in 1923. Species have been recorded from India, Indochina, Malesia through to New Guinea.

== Species ==
The Phasmida Species File lists:

1. Nescicroa angustata (Redtenbacher, 1908)
2. Nescicroa bonneaui Hennemann & Le Tirant, 2023
3. Nescicroa gulare (Haan, 1842)
4. Nescicroa heinrichi Günther, 1935
5. Nescicroa obliterata (Redtenbacher, 1908)
6. Nescicroa papuana (Brancsik, 1898)
7. Nescicroa rammei Günther, 1935
8. Nescicroa redempta (Redtenbacher, 1908)
9. Nescicroa resignata (Redtenbacher, 1908)
10. Nescicroa rivalis (Redtenbacher, 1908)
11. Nescicroa rojachichiorum (Seow-Choen, 2020)
12. Nescicroa rufescens Hennemann, 1998
13. Nescicroa ruficeps (Kirby, 1904)
14. Nescicroa sanguinata (Redtenbacher, 1908)
15. Nescicroa smaragdula (Bates, 1865)
16. Nescicroa splendida Hennemann, 2021
17. Nescicroa tereticollis (Redtenbacher, 1908)
18. Nescicroa terminalis (Redtenbacher, 1908) - type species (as Necroscia terminalis Redtenbacher)
19. Nescicroa tumescens (Redtenbacher, 1908)
20. Nescicroa viridilineata (Bates, 1865)
