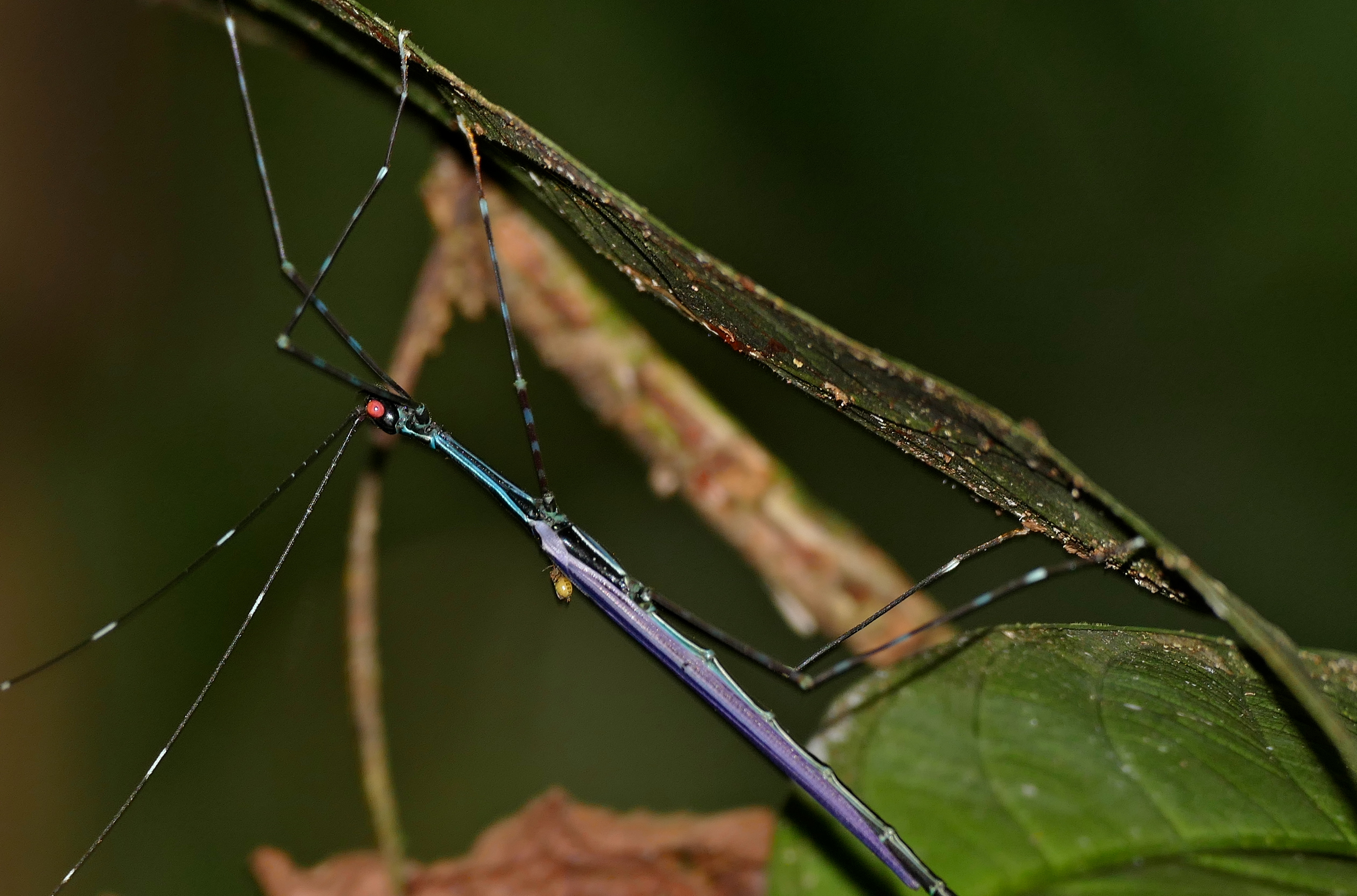

Scientific classification
- Domain: Eukaryota
- Kingdom: Animalia
- Phylum: Arthropoda
- Class: Insecta
- Order: Phasmatodea
- Family: Lonchodidae
- Subfamily: Necrosciinae
- Tribe: Necrosciini
- Genus: Orthonecroscia; Kirby, 1904

Synonyms
- Necroscia Brunner von Wattenwyl, 1893; Ocellata Redtenbacher, 1908

= Orthonecroscia =

Genus of stick insects

Orthonecroscia is a genus of stick insect first described by William Forsell Kirby in 1904.

== Taxonomy ==
Orthonecroscia contains the following species:

- Orthonecroscia fastidiosa
- Orthonecroscia festinabunda
- Orthonecroscia longicornis
- Orthonecroscia rahimi
- Orthonecroscia speciosa
- Orthonecroscia dux
- Orthonecroscia chaperi
- Orthonecroscia filum
- Orthonecroscia fumata
- Orthonecroscia laetissima
- Orthonecroscia mjoebergi
- Orthonecroscia ruficeps
- Orthonecroscia coeruleomaculata
- Orthonecroscia oreibates
- Orthonecroscia nieuwenhuisi
- Orthonecroscia laeta
- Orthonecroscia felix
- Orthonecroscia errans
- Orthonecroscia deflorata
- Orthonecroscia conlei
- Orthonecroscia violascens
- Orthonecroscia serena
- Orthonecroscia fuscoannulata
- Orthonecroscia keatsooni
- Orthonecroscia mjobergi
- Orthonecroscia pulcherrima
