= Sinophasma =

Scientific classification
- Domain: Eukaryota
- Kingdom: Animalia
- Phylum: Arthropoda
- Class: Insecta
- Order: Phasmatodea
- Family: Lonchodidae
- Subfamily: Necrosciinae
- Tribe: Necrosciini
- Genus: Sinophasma; Günther, 1940

Genus of stick insects

External image
- Images at iNaturalist

Sinophasma is a genus of Asian stick insects in the tribe Necrosciini, erected by Günther in 1940. Species have been recorded from China, Vietnam and Taiwan (distribution may be incomplete).

== Species ==
The Phasmida Species File lists:

1. Sinophasma angulatum Liu, 1987
2. Sinophasma atratum Chen & He, 2000
3. Sinophasma biacuminatum Chen & He, 2006
4. Sinophasma bii Ho, 2012
5. Sinophasma brevipenne Günther, 1940
6. Sinophasma curvatum Chen & He, 1994
7. Sinophasma damingshanensis Ho, 2014
8. Sinophasma daoyingi Ho, 2012
9. Sinophasma furcatum Chen & He, 1993
10. Sinophasma guangdongensis Ho, 2012
11. Sinophasma hainanense Liu, 1987
12. Sinophasma hoenei Günther, 1940
13. Sinophasma jinxiuense Chen & He, 2008
14. Sinophasma klapperichi Günther, 1940 - type species
15. Sinophasma largum Chen & Chen, 1998
16. Sinophasma latisectum Chen & Chen, 1997
17. Sinophasma maculicruralis Chen, 1986
18. Sinophasma mirabile Günther, 1940
19. Sinophasma obvium (Chen & He, 1995)
20. Sinophasma pseudomirabile Chen & Chen, 1996
21. Sinophasma rugicollis Chen, 1991
22. Sinophasma striatum Chen & He, 2006
23. Sinophasma trispinosum Chen & Chen, 1997
24. Sinophasma truncatum (Shiraki, 1935)
25. Sinophasma unispinosum Chen & Chen, 1997
26. Sinophasma vietnamense Chen & Chen, 1999
