= Cheniphasma =

Scientific classification
- Domain: Eukaryota
- Kingdom: Animalia
- Phylum: Arthropoda
- Class: Insecta
- Order: Phasmatodea
- Family: Lonchodidae
- Subfamily: Necrosciinae
- Tribe: Necrosciini
- Genus: Cheniphasma; Ho, 2012

Genus of stick insects

External image
- Image of C. fruhstorferi at PSF

Cheniphasma is a genus of stick insects in the tribe Necrosciini, erected by G.W.C. Ho in 2012. Species have been recorded from China (Guangdong) and Vietnam.

== Species ==
The Phasmida Species File lists:

1. Cheniphasma fruhstorferi (Brunner von Wattenwyl, 1907) (synonym Menexenus fruhstorferi from Vietnam)
2. Cheniphasma granulatum Ho, 2013
3. Cheniphasma parvidentatum Ho, 2020
4. Cheniphasma serrifemoralis Ho, 2012 - type species
