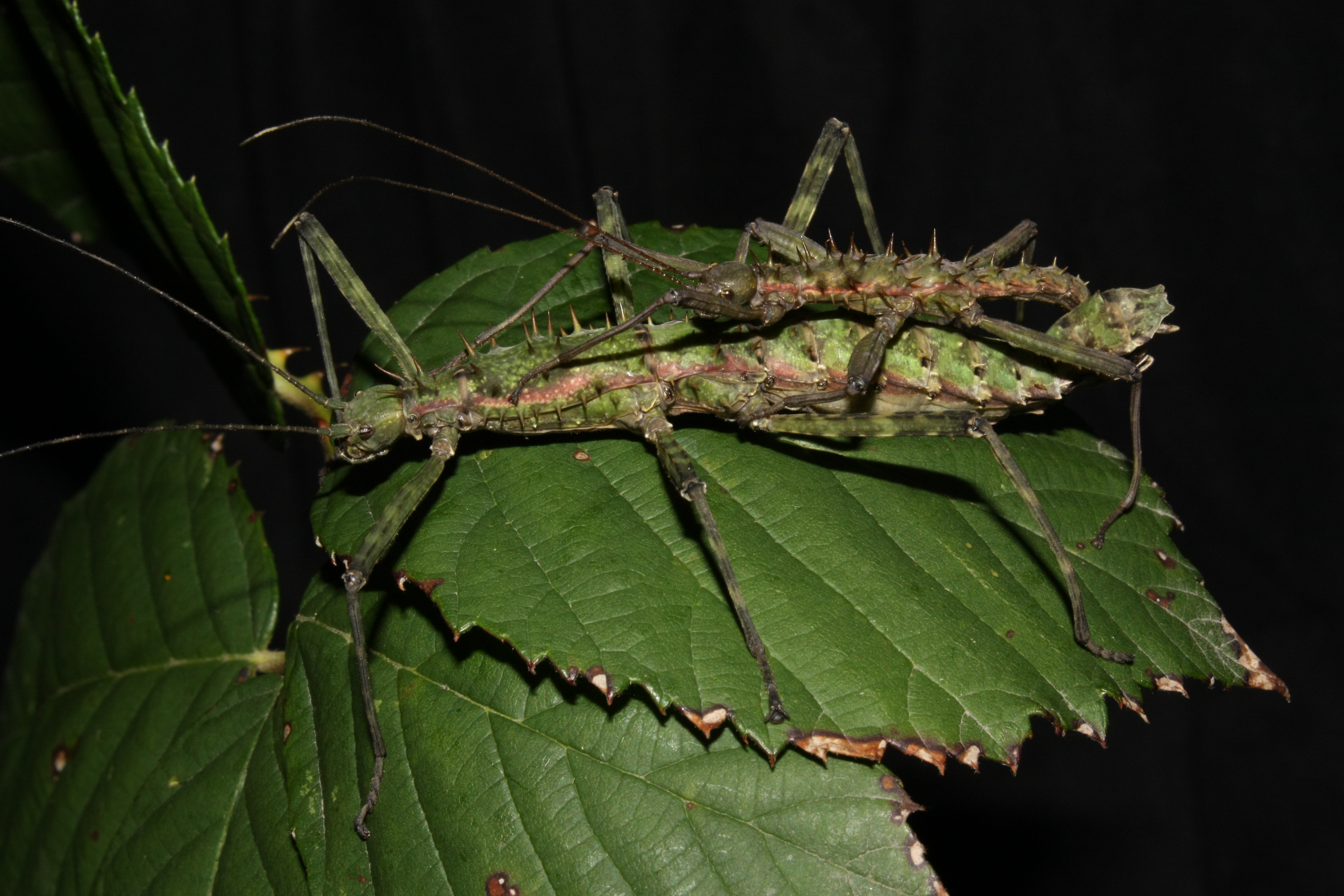
- Spinohirasea bengalensis: male and female (in culture)

Scientific classification
- Domain: Eukaryota
- Kingdom: Animalia
- Phylum: Arthropoda
- Class: Insecta
- Order: Phasmatodea
- Family: Lonchodidae
- Subfamily: Necrosciinae
- Tribe: Necrosciini
- Genus: Spinohirasea; Zompro, 2002

Synonyms
- Spinohirasea crassithorax Zompro, 2002

= Spinohirasea =

Genus of stick insects

Spinohirasea is currently a monotypic genus of stick insects in the tribe Necrosciini, erected by Zompro in 2002. To date (2022) the sole species has been recorded from Vietnam.

== Species ==
The Phasmida Species File currently only includes Spinohirasea bengalensis (Brunner von Wattenwyl, 1907): with the genus name described as S. crassithorax Zompro, 2002 and the species name from Menexenus bengalensis, described by Carl Brunner von Wattenwyl. The type specimens were found in Dy Thuong village, Hà Tĩnh province. This species can be kept in culture, fed by bramble, raspberry, Hypericum or ivy.

== Gallery ==
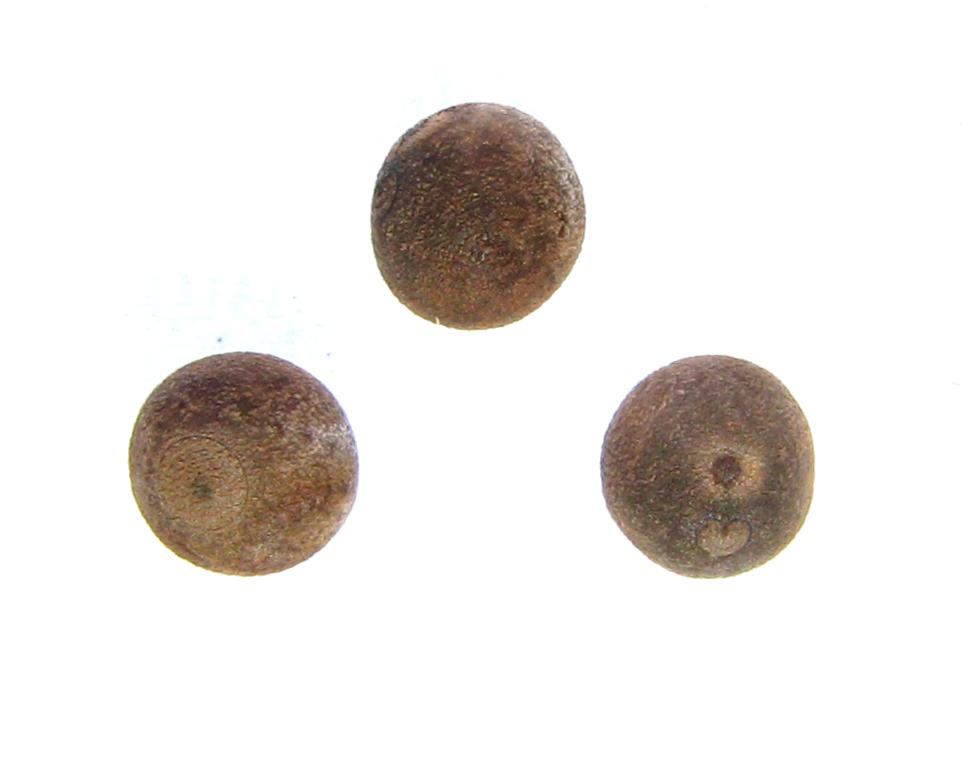
eggs

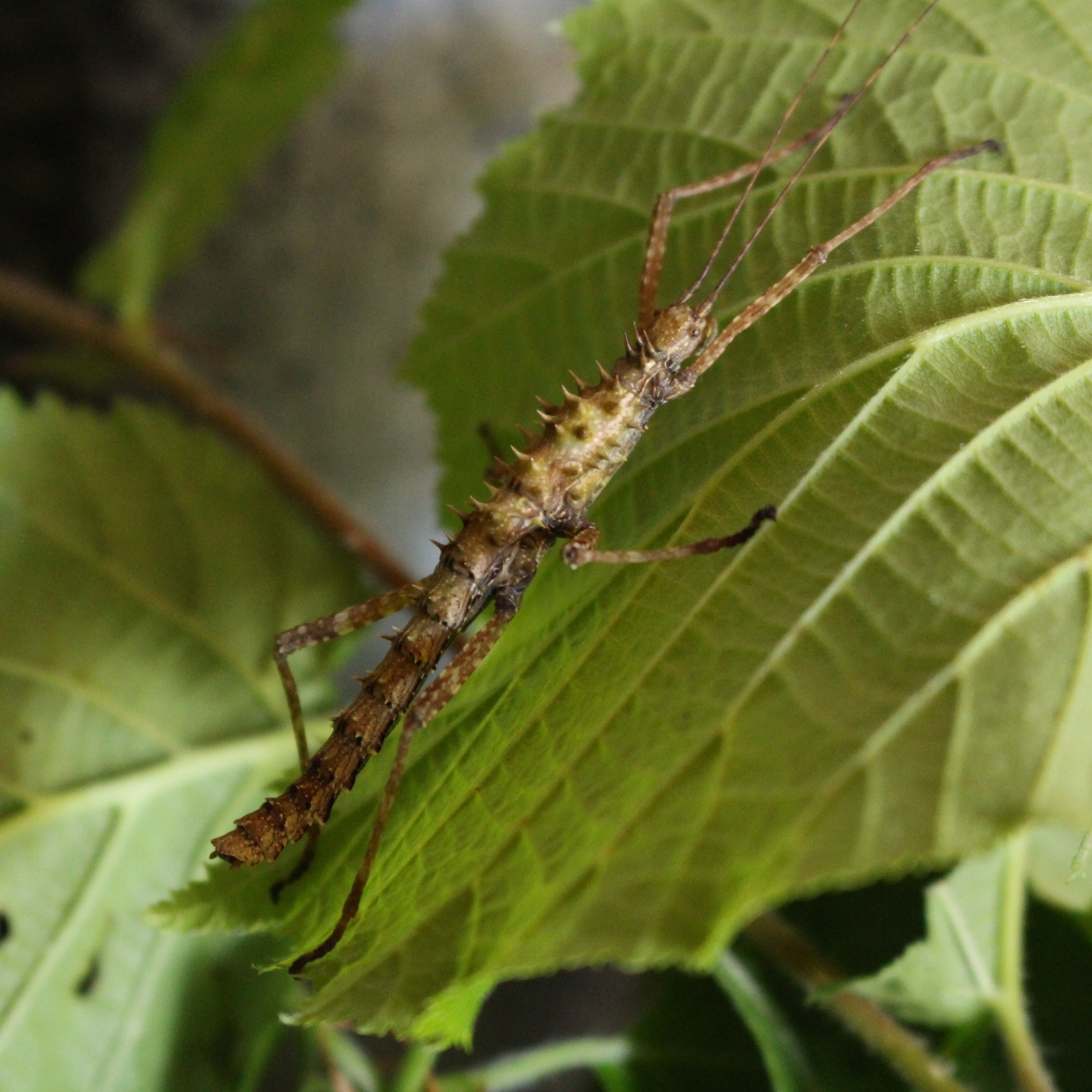
nymph

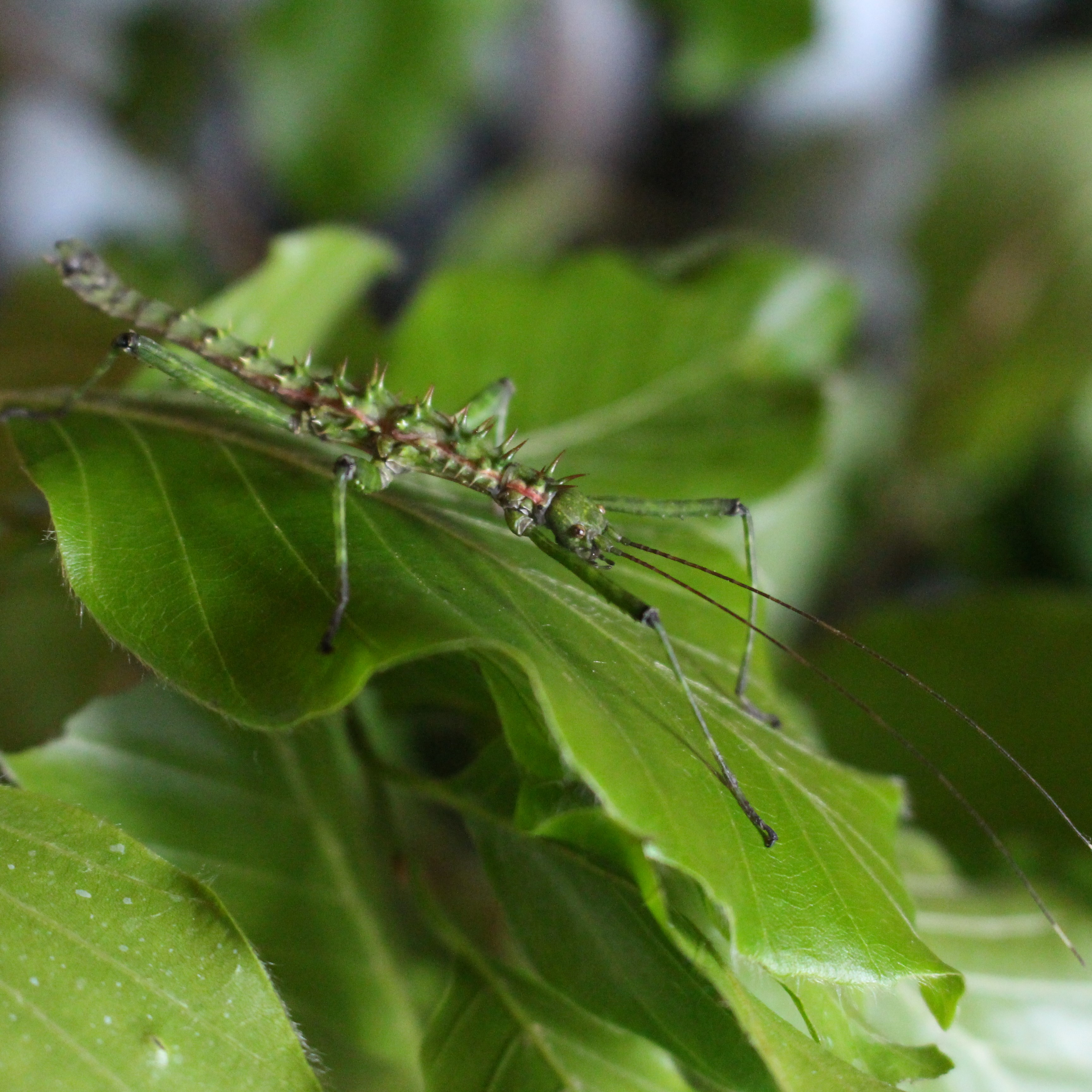
adult male

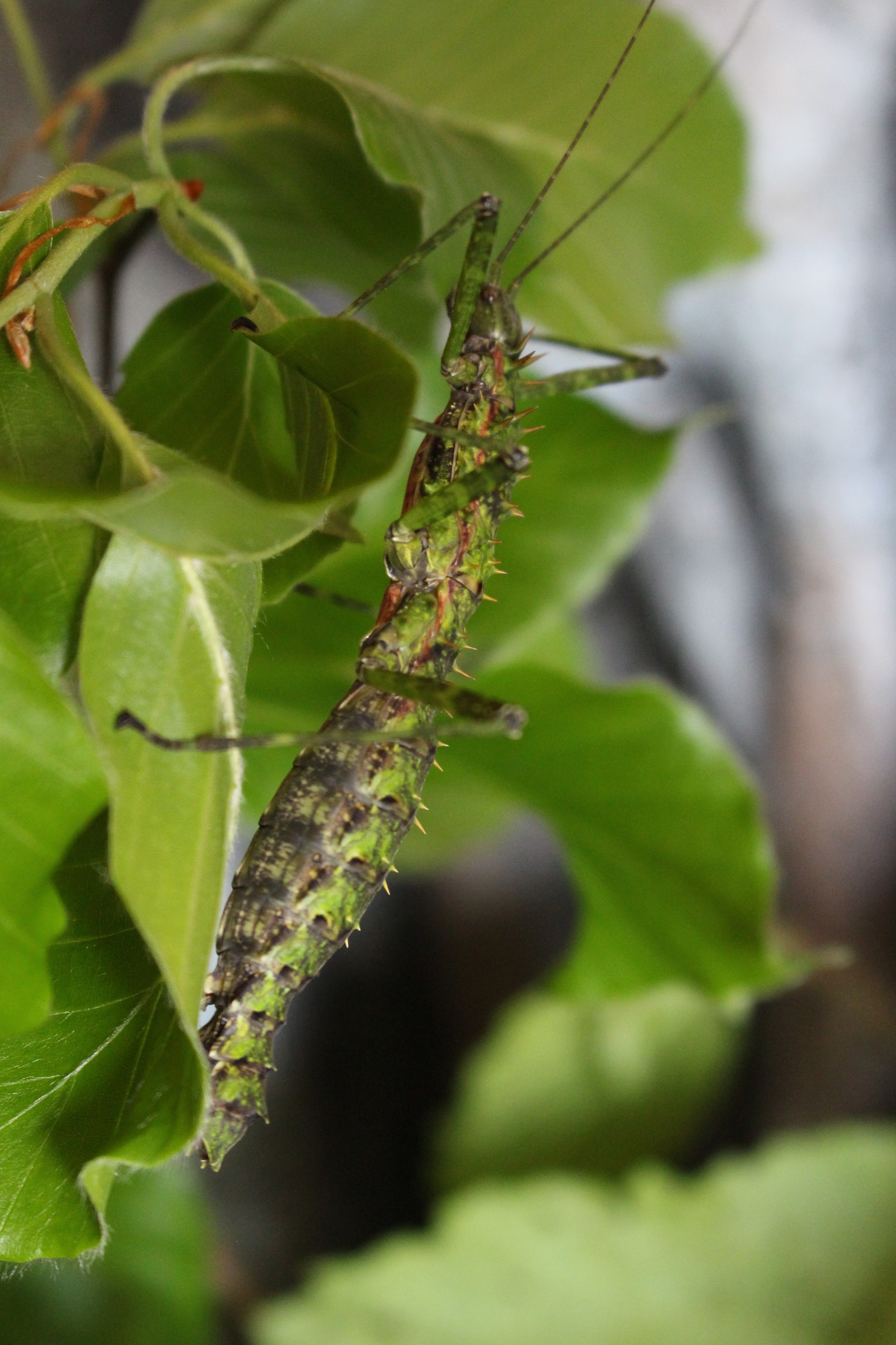
adult female
