= Pseudocentema =

Scientific classification
- Domain: Eukaryota
- Kingdom: Animalia
- Phylum: Arthropoda
- Class: Insecta
- Order: Phasmatodea
- Family: Lonchodidae
- Tribe: Necrosciini
- Genus: Pseudocentema; Chen, He & Li, 2002

Genus of insects

Pseudocentema is a genus of phasmids belonging to the tribe Necrosciini fromChina.

Species:

- Pseudocentema bispinatum Chen & He, 2002
- Pseudocentema liui Ho, 2013
