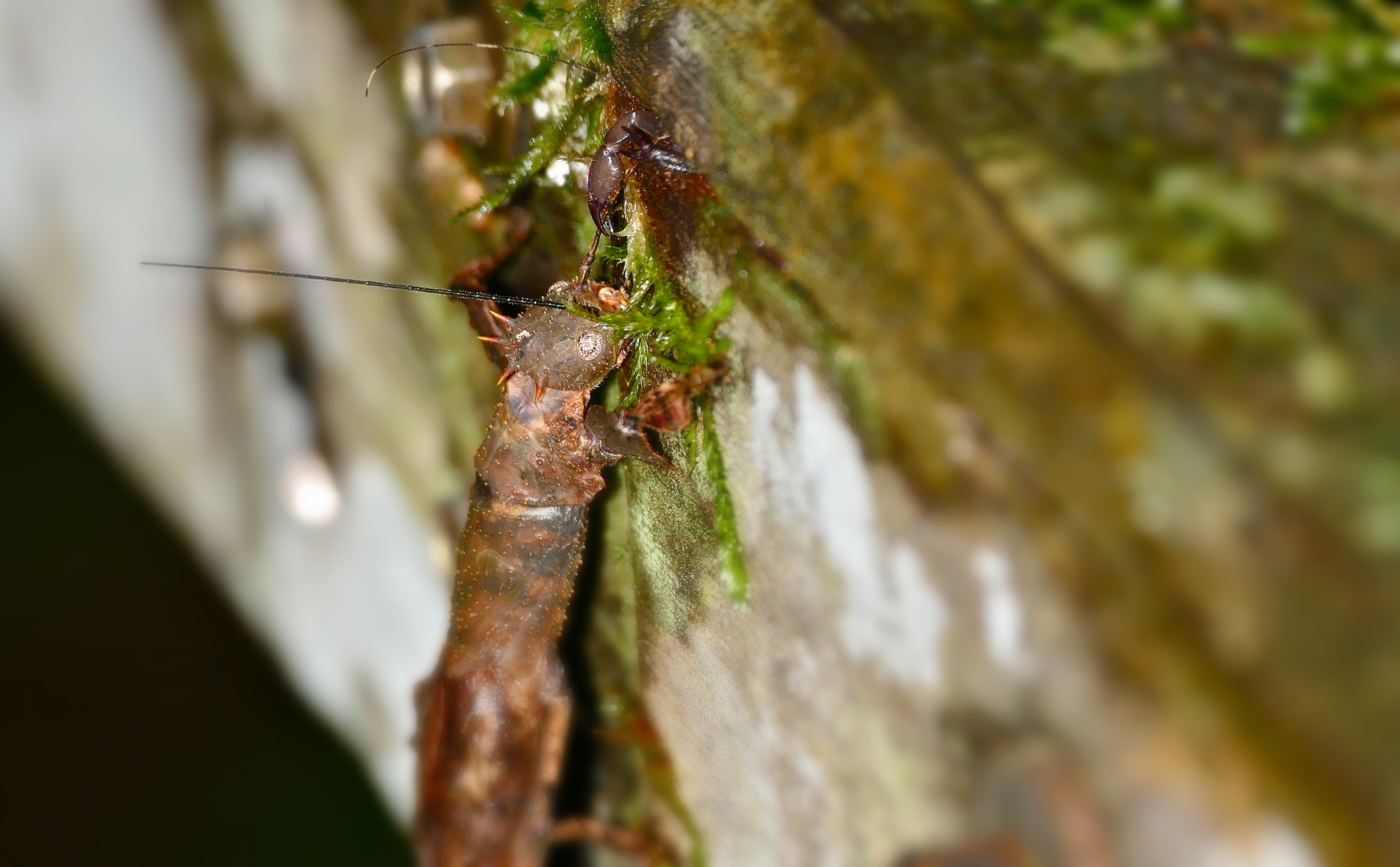
- Neoclides sp.

Scientific classification
- Kingdom: Animalia
- Phylum: Arthropoda
- Clade: Pancrustacea
- Class: Insecta
- Order: Phasmatodea
- Infraorder: Anareolatae
- Family: Lonchodidae
- Subfamily: Necrosciinae
- Genus: Neoclides; Uvarov, 1940

Synonyms
- Neocles Stål, 1875

= Neoclides =

Genus of stick insects

Neoclides is an Asian genus of stick insects in the subfamily Necrosciinae (and as with all mainland Asian genera, in the tribe Necrosciini). Species have a known distribution from: Indo-China, Borneo, Sumatra, Philippines and New Guinea.

== Species ==
Neoclides includes the following species:

- Neoclides aesalus (Westwood, 1859)
- Neoclides buescheri Seow-Choen, 2016
- Neoclides cordifer (Redtenbacher, 1908)
- Neoclides diacis (Haan, 1842)
- Neoclides echinatus (Redtenbacher, 1908)
- Neoclides epombrus (Günther, 1929)
- Neoclides heitzmanni Bresseel, 2013
- Neoclides jimi Seow-Choen, 2018
- Neoclides laceratus (Haan, 1842)
- Neoclides magistralis (Redtenbacher, 1908)
- Neoclides marshallae Seow-Choen, 2016
- Neoclides mohamedsaidi (Seow-Choen, 2004)
- Neoclides rivalis (Redtenbacher, 1908)
- Neoclides simyra (Westwood, 1859) - type species (as Creoxylus simyra Westwood)
- Neoclides spiniger (Günther, 1943)
- Neoclides spinofoliatus Seow-Choen, 2017
