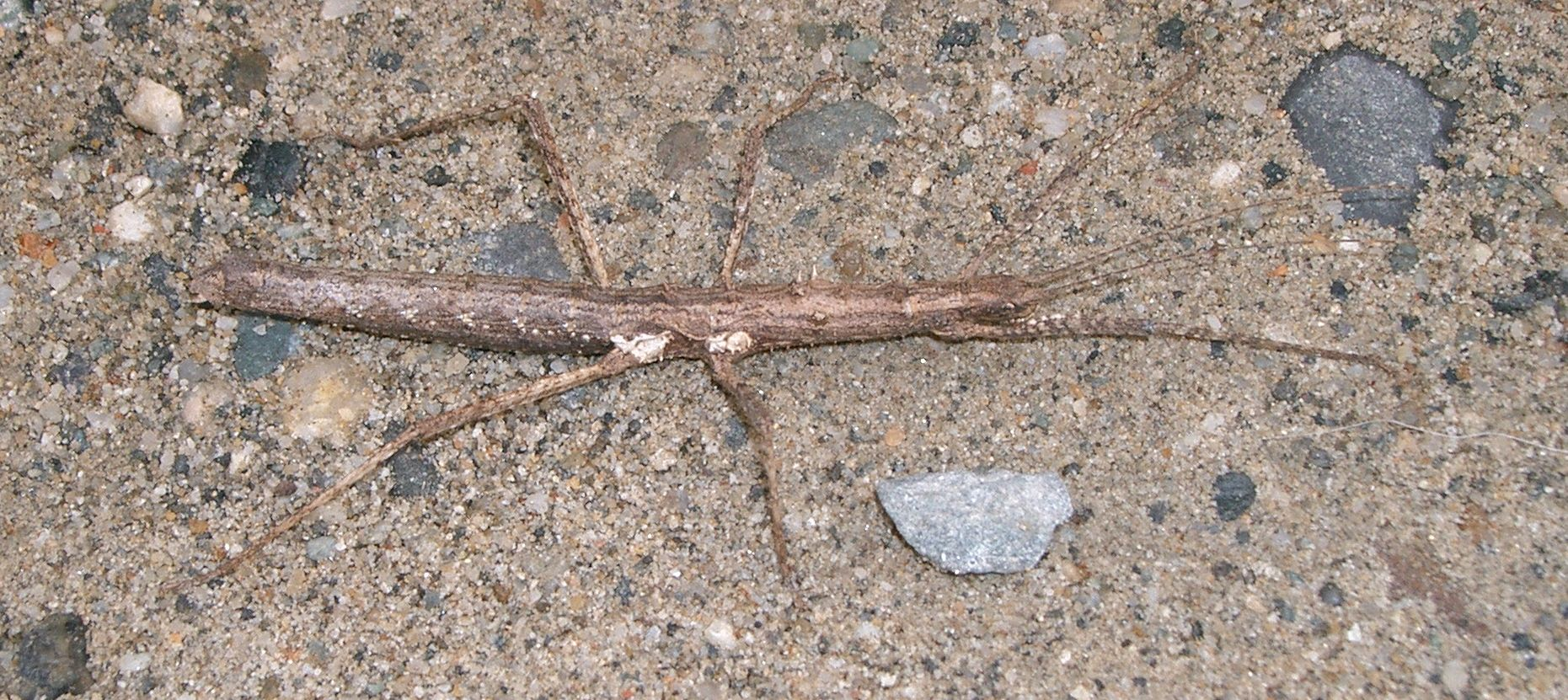
- Neohirasea japonica

Scientific classification
- Domain: Eukaryota
- Kingdom: Animalia
- Phylum: Arthropoda
- Class: Insecta
- Order: Phasmatodea
- Family: Lonchodidae
- Subfamily: Necrosciinae
- Tribe: Necrosciini
- Genus: Neohirasea; Rehn, 1904

Synonyms
- Heterophasma Redtenbacher, 1908; Paracentema Redtenbacher, 1908

= Neohirasea =

Genus of stick insects

Neohirasea is a genus of stick insects in the tribe Necrosciini, erected by J.A.G. Rehn in 1904. Species have been recorded from temperate and tropical Asia, including: China, India, Japan, Malaysia and Vietnam.

== Species ==
The Phasmida Species File lists:

1. Neohirasea asper (Redtenbacher, 1908)
2. Neohirasea biserrata Ho, 2018
3. Neohirasea bispina Ho, 2018
4. Neohirasea catbaensis Ho, 2018
5. Neohirasea cochinchinensis (Redtenbacher, 1908)
6. Neohirasea coomani Ho, 2018
7. Neohirasea gaudichaudi (Redtenbacher, 1908)
8. Neohirasea guangdongensis Chen & He, 2008
9. Neohirasea hilli Ho, 2018
10. Neohirasea hongkongensis Brock & Seow-Choen, 2000
11. Neohirasea hujiayaoi Ho, 2017
12. Neohirasea japonica (de Haan, 1842)
  - type species (as Phasma japonicum de Haan)
13. Neohirasea maerens (Brunner von Wattenwyl, 1907)
14. Neohirasea nana (Carl, 1913)
15. Neohirasea nanlingensis Ho, 2017
16. Neohirasea obesus (Brunner von Wattenwyl, 1907)
17. Neohirasea stephanus (Redtenbacher, 1908)
18. Neohirasea unispina Ho, 2017
19. Neohirasea unnoi Brock, 1999
