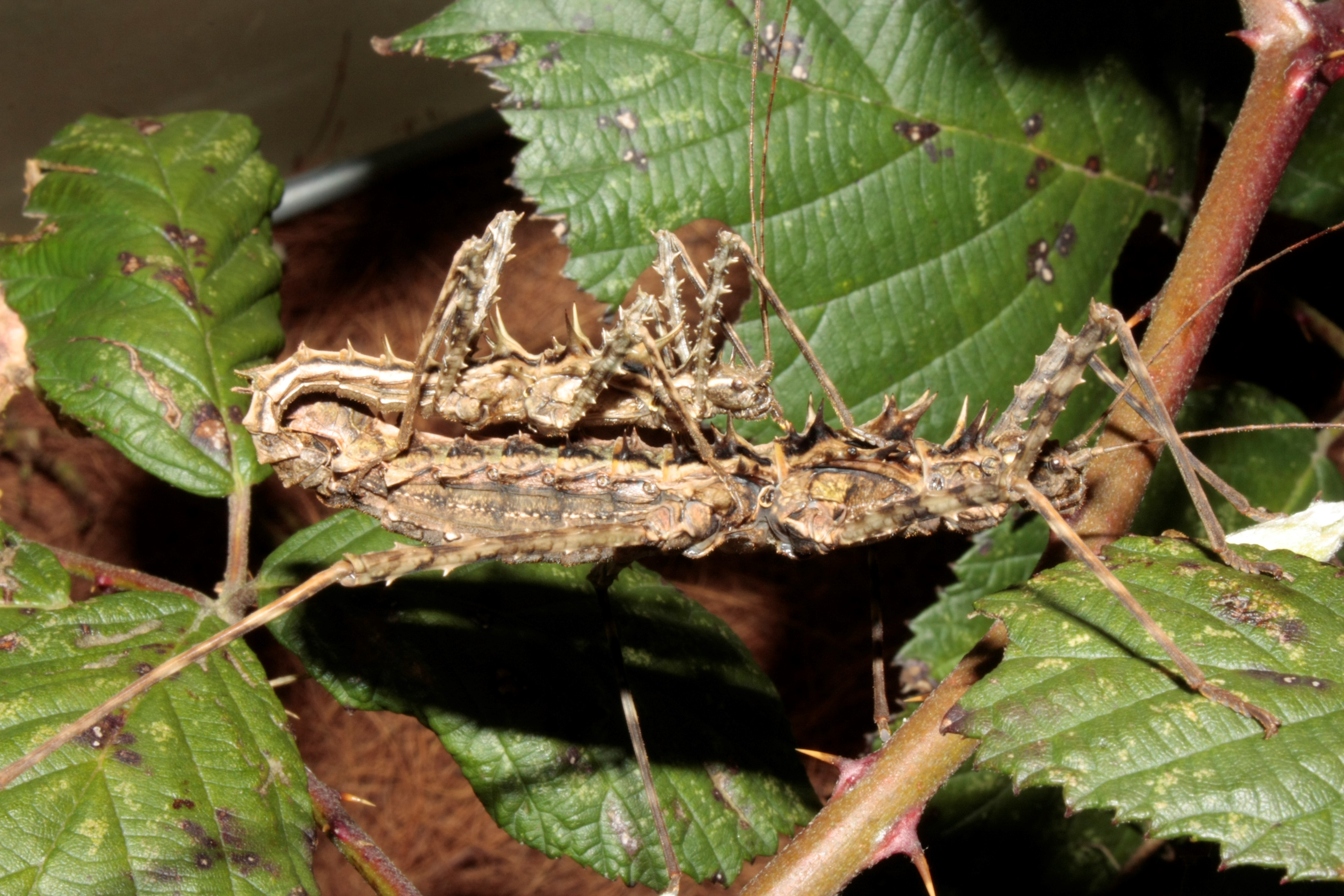
- Brockphasma spinifemoralis (male and female in captivity)

Scientific classification
- Domain: Eukaryota
- Kingdom: Animalia
- Phylum: Arthropoda
- Class: Insecta
- Order: Phasmatodea
- Family: Lonchodidae
- Subfamily: Necrosciinae
- Tribe: Necrosciini
- Genus: Brockphasma; Ho, Liu, Bresseel & Constant, 2014

= Brockphasma =

Genus of stick insects

Brockphasma is currently a monotypic genus of Asian stick insects in the tribe Necrosciini, erected by G.W.C. Ho, Liu, Bresseel & Constant in 2014. To date, one species has been recorded from Vietnam.

== Species ==
The Phasmida Species File currently only includes Brockphasma spinifemoralis Ho, Liu, Bresseel & Constant, 2014: found in Bạch Mã National Park; the genus was named after the English stick insect specialist Paul Brock.
