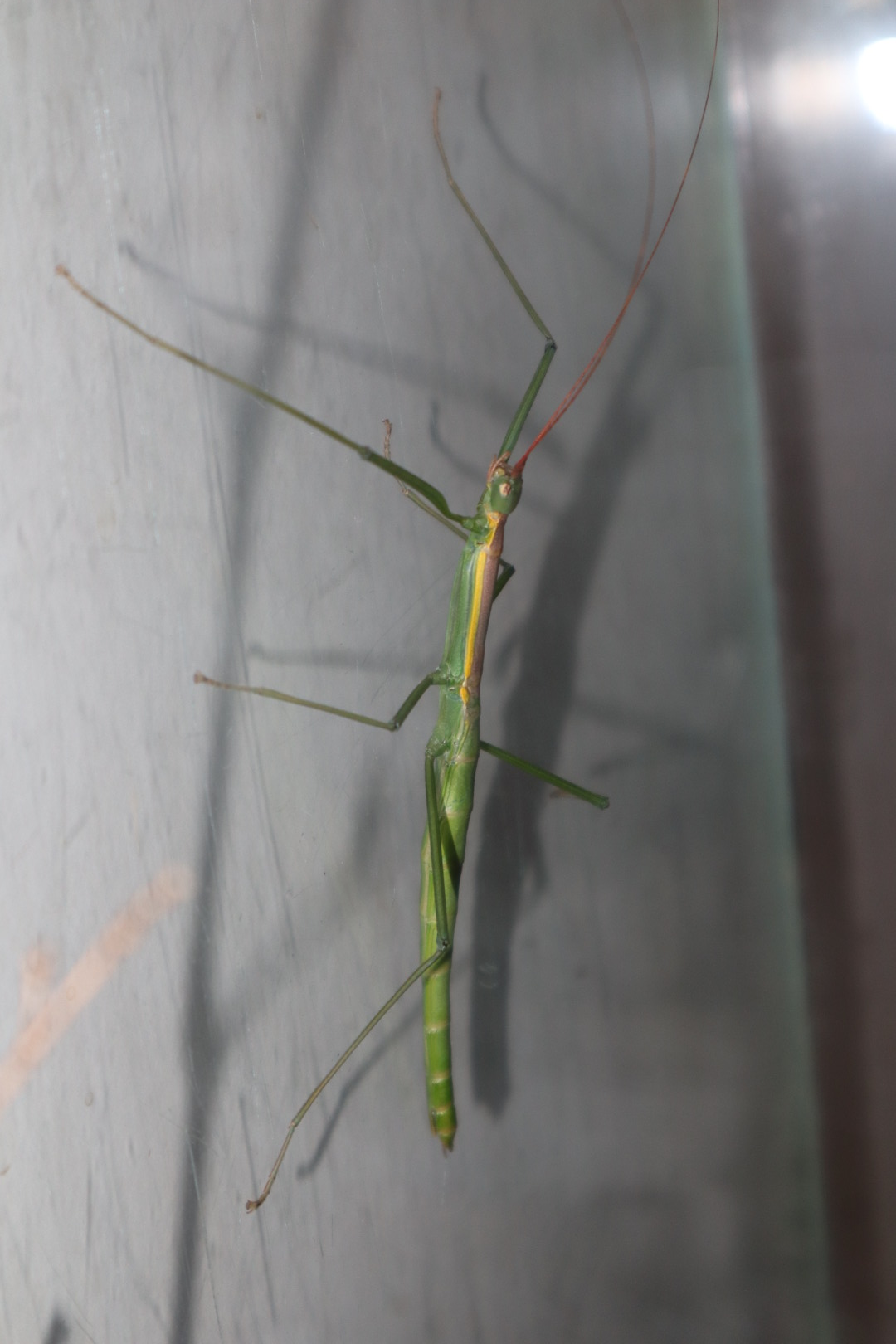
- Lamachodes sp.

Scientific classification
- Domain: Eukaryota
- Kingdom: Animalia
- Phylum: Arthropoda
- Class: Insecta
- Order: Phasmatodea
- Family: Lonchodidae
- Subfamily: Necrosciinae
- Tribe: Necrosciini
- Genus: Lamachodes; Redtenbacher, 1908

= Lamachodes =

Genus of stick insects

Lamachodes is a genus of stick insects in the tribe Necrosciini, erected by Josef Redtenbacher in 1908. To date (2022) species have been recorded only from Vietnam.

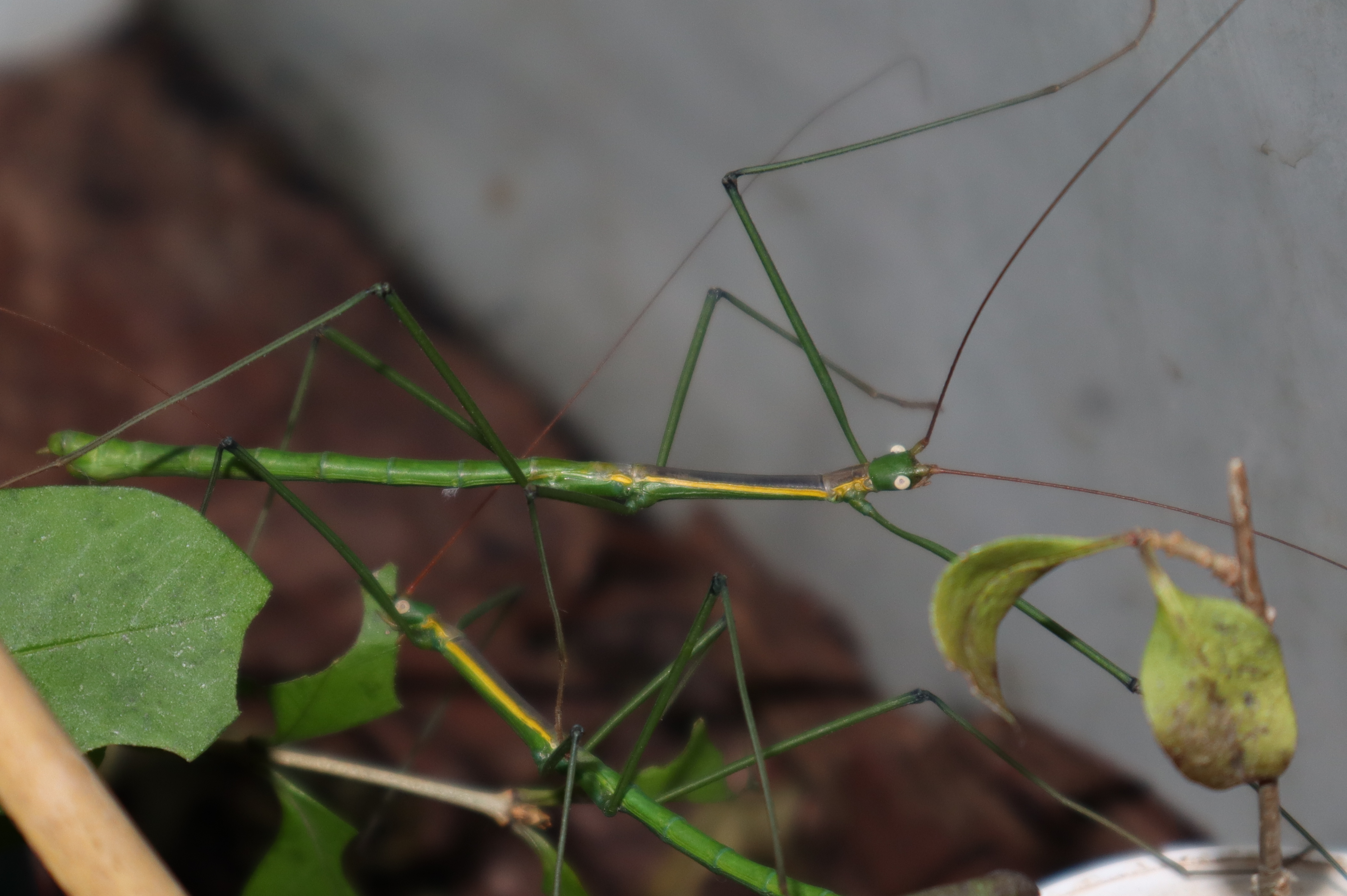
close-up of head and thorax

== Species ==
The Phasmida Species File lists:

1. Lamachodes brocki Ho, 2018
2. Lamachodes laevis Redtenbacher, 1908 - type species
