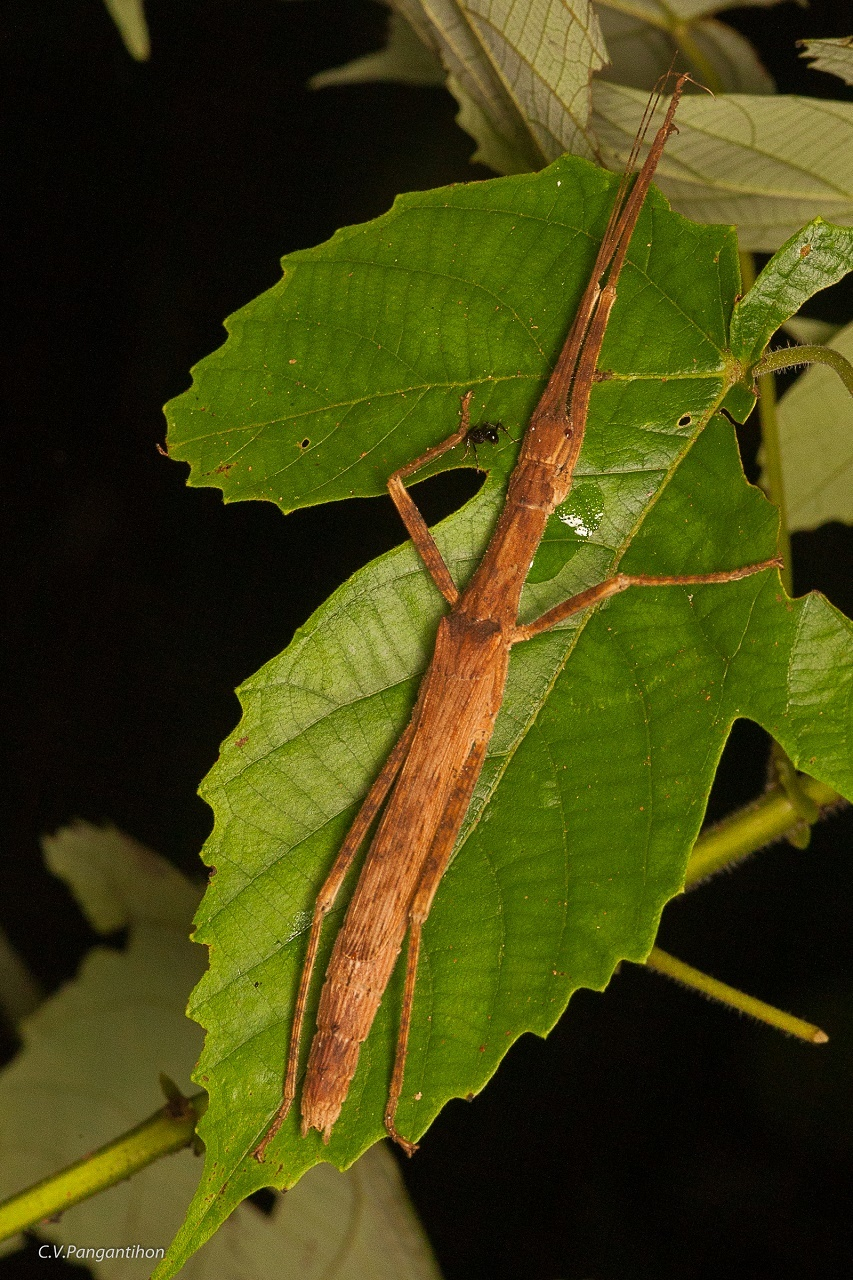
- Asceles margaritatus

Scientific classification
- Kingdom: Animalia
- Phylum: Arthropoda
- Clade: Pancrustacea
- Class: Insecta
- Order: Phasmatodea
- Family: Lonchodidae
- Tribe: Necrosciini
- Genus: Asceles; Redtenbacher 1905; but other sources claim Redtenbacher 1908

Species
- See text

Synonyms
- See text

= Asceles =

Genus of stick insects

Asceles is a genus of stick insects in the tribe Necrosciini. Some of the species of Asceles have a distribution in Malaysia and Singapore.

== Species ==
Many of the species have numerous synonyms which will be listed alongside their accepted name: see talk page for current list.

- Asceles adspirans (Redtenbacher 1908)
- Asceles annandalei (Günther 1938)
- Asceles bispinus (Redtenbacher 1908)
- Asceles brevicollis (Redtenbacher 1908)
- Asceles brevipennis (Redtenbacher 1908); also attributed to Hennemann, Conle & W. Zhang, 2008
- Asceles caesius (Chen, S.C. & Y.H. He 1999)
- Asceles certus (Redtenbacher 1908)
- Asceles civilis (Redtenbacher 1908)
- Asceles clavatus (Chen, S.C. & J. Wang 1998)
- Asceles cornucervi (Redtenbacher 1908)
- Asceles diadema (Redtenbacher 1908)
- Asceles dilatatus (Chen, S.C. & Y.H. He 2004)
- Asceles dorsalis (Redtenbacher 1908)
- Asceles elongatus (Redtenbacher 1908)
- Asceles gadarama (Westwood 1859); also known as Necroscia gadarama (Westwood, 1859) and Sosibia gadarama (Westwood, 1859)
- Asceles glaber (Günther 1938)
- Asceles gracillimus (Werner 1934); also known as Aaceles gracillimus
- Asceles heros (Redtenbacher 1908)
- Asceles icaris (Stål 1877); also known as Necroscia icaris (Stål, 1877)
- Asceles larunda (Westwood 1859); also known as Asceles inquinatus (Redtenbacher, 1908) and Necroscia larunda (Westwood, 1859)
- Asceles lineatus (Redtenbacher 1908)
- Asceles longicauda (Bi 1990); also known as Sinophasma longicauda
- Asceles longipes (Redtenbacher 1908)
- Asceles longzhouensis (Chen, S.C. & Y.H. He 2000)
- Asceles malaccae (Saussure 1868); also known as Necroscia malaccae (Saussure, 1868)
- Asceles mancinus (Westwood 1859); also known as Necroscia mancinus (Westwood, 1859) and Sosibia mancinus (Westwood, 1859)
- Asceles margaritatus (Redtenbacher 1908)
- Asceles mecheli (Redtenbacher 1908)
- Asceles nigrogranosus (Stål 1877); also known as Asceles nigrogranosa (Stål, 1877) and Necroscia nigrogranosa (Stål, 1877)
- Asceles obsoletus (Redtenbacher 1908); also attributed to Otte & Brock, 2005
- Asceles opacus (Redtenbacher 1908)
- Asceles panteli (Redtenbacher 1908)
- Asceles penicillatus (Redtenbacher 1908)
- Asceles perplexus (Redtenbacher 1908)
- Asceles pumila (Werner 1934); also known as Aaceles pumila
- Asceles quadriguttatus (Chen, S.C. & Y.H. He 1996); also known as Pachyscia quadriguttata (Chen & He, 1996)
- Asceles rufescens (Redtenbacher 1908); also known as Sipyloidea rufescens (Redtenbacher, 1908)
- Asceles rulanda, of which there are three subspecies: Asceles rulanda modestior (Redtenbacher, 1908), Asceles rulanda rulanda (Redtenbacher, 1908) and Asceles rulanda undulatipes (Redtenbacher, 1908). Asceles rulanda undulatipes has also been written as Aaceles undulatipes with the presumed synonym Asceles undulatipes
- Asceles rusticus (Redtenbacher 1908)
- Asceles scabra (Stål 1877); also known as Asceles scaber (Redtenbacher, 1908), Necroscia scabra (Stål, 877), Sipyloidea scabra (Stål, 1877) and Sosibia scabra (Stål, 1877)
- Asceles tanarata, of which are three subspecies: Asceles tanarata amplior (Brock, 1999), Asceles tanarata singapura (Seow-Choen & Brock, 1999) and Asceles tanarata tanarata (Brock, 1999)
- Asceles validus (Redtenbacher 1908)
- Asceles villosus (Redtenbacher 1908)
