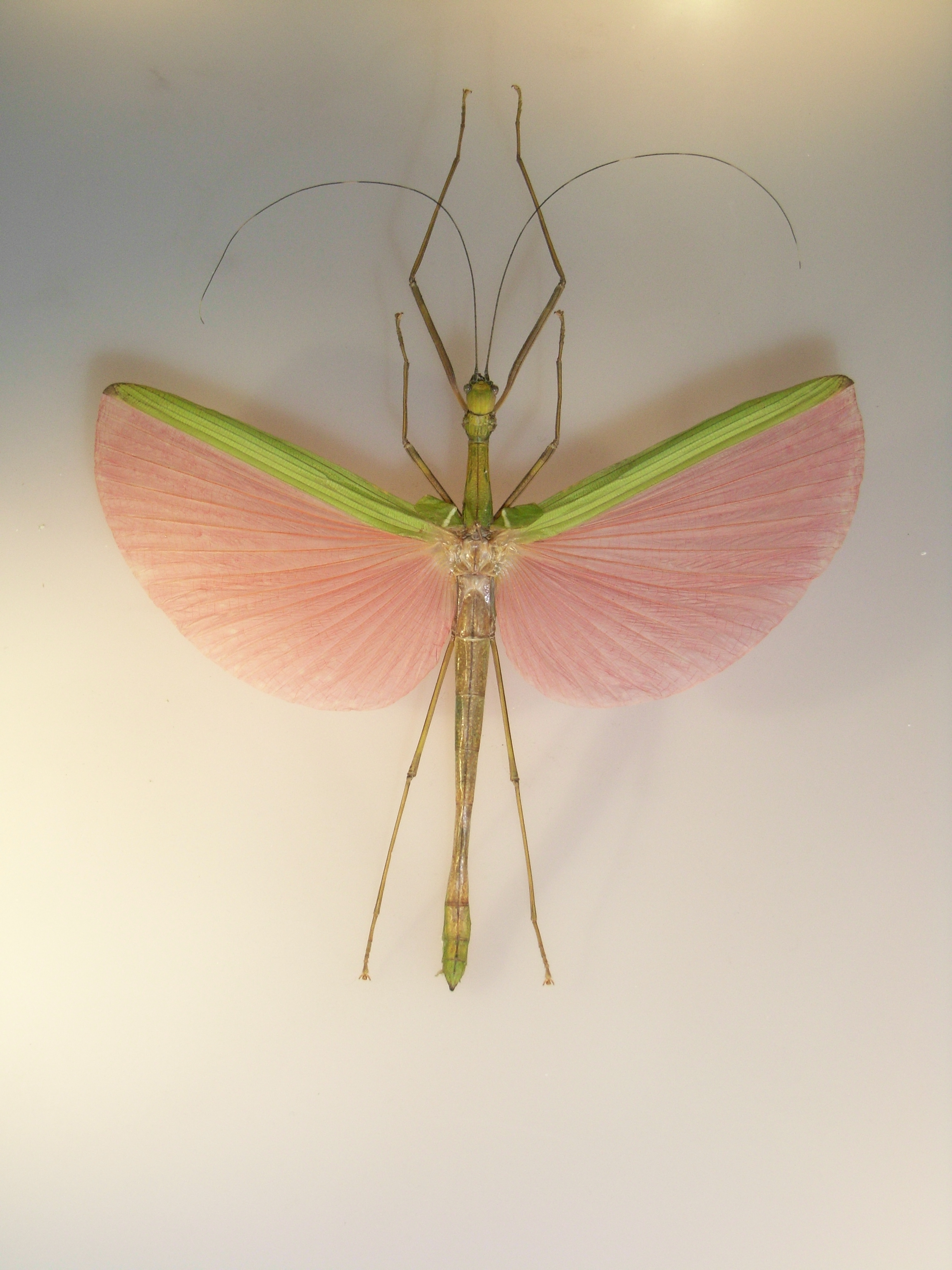
- Marmessoidea rosea

Scientific classification
- Domain: Eukaryota
- Kingdom: Animalia
- Phylum: Arthropoda
- Class: Insecta
- Order: Phasmatodea
- Family: Lonchodidae
- Tribe: Necrosciini
- Genus: Marmessoidea; Brunner von Wattenwyl, 1893

Synonyms
- Trigonophasma Kirby, 1904

= Marmessoidea =

Genus of stick insects

Marmessoidea is an Asian genus of stick insects in the family Lonchodidae and subfamily Necrosciinae. The native range of species appears to be from India and South-East Asia to the Wallace line.

== Species ==
The Catalogue of Life and Phasmida Species File list:

- Marmessoidea abbreviata Redtenbacher, 1908
- Marmessoidea annulata (Fabricius, 1798)
- Marmessoidea biplagiata Redtenbacher, 1908
- Marmessoidea bisbiguttata (Burmeister, 1838)
- Marmessoidea casignetus (Westwood, 1859)
- Marmessoidea chinensis Redtenbacher, 1908
- Marmessoidea conspurcata Redtenbacher, 1908
- Marmessoidea dimidiata Redtenbacher, 1908
- Marmessoidea euplectes (Westwood, 1859)
- Marmessoidea expolita Redtenbacher, 1908
- Marmessoidea flavoguttata (Stål, 1877)
- Marmessoidea flavomarginata Redtenbacher, 1908
- Marmessoidea haemorrhoidalis Redtenbacher, 1908
- Marmessoidea hainanensis Ho, 2016
- Marmessoidea incensa Redtenbacher, 1908
- Marmessoidea ismene (Westwood, 1859)
- Marmessoidea lineata Redtenbacher, 1908
- Marmessoidea liuxingyuei Ho, 2018
- Marmessoidea moesta Redtenbacher, 1908
- Marmessoidea mustea (Bates, 1865)
- Marmessoidea notata Redtenbacher, 1908
- Marmessoidea poggii Seow-Choen, 2017
- Marmessoidea quadriguttata (Burmeister, 1838)
- Marmessoidea quadrisignata Redtenbacher, 1908
- Marmessoidea rosea (Fabricius, 1793) - type species (as Necroscia marmessus Westwood probably from Malaysia)
- Marmessoidea rotundatogibbosa Redtenbacher, 1908
- Marmessoidea rubescens (Saussure, 1868)
- Marmessoidea sumatrensis Brancsik, 1893
- Marmessoidea usta Redtenbacher, 1908
- Marmessoidea vinosa (Serville, 1838)
