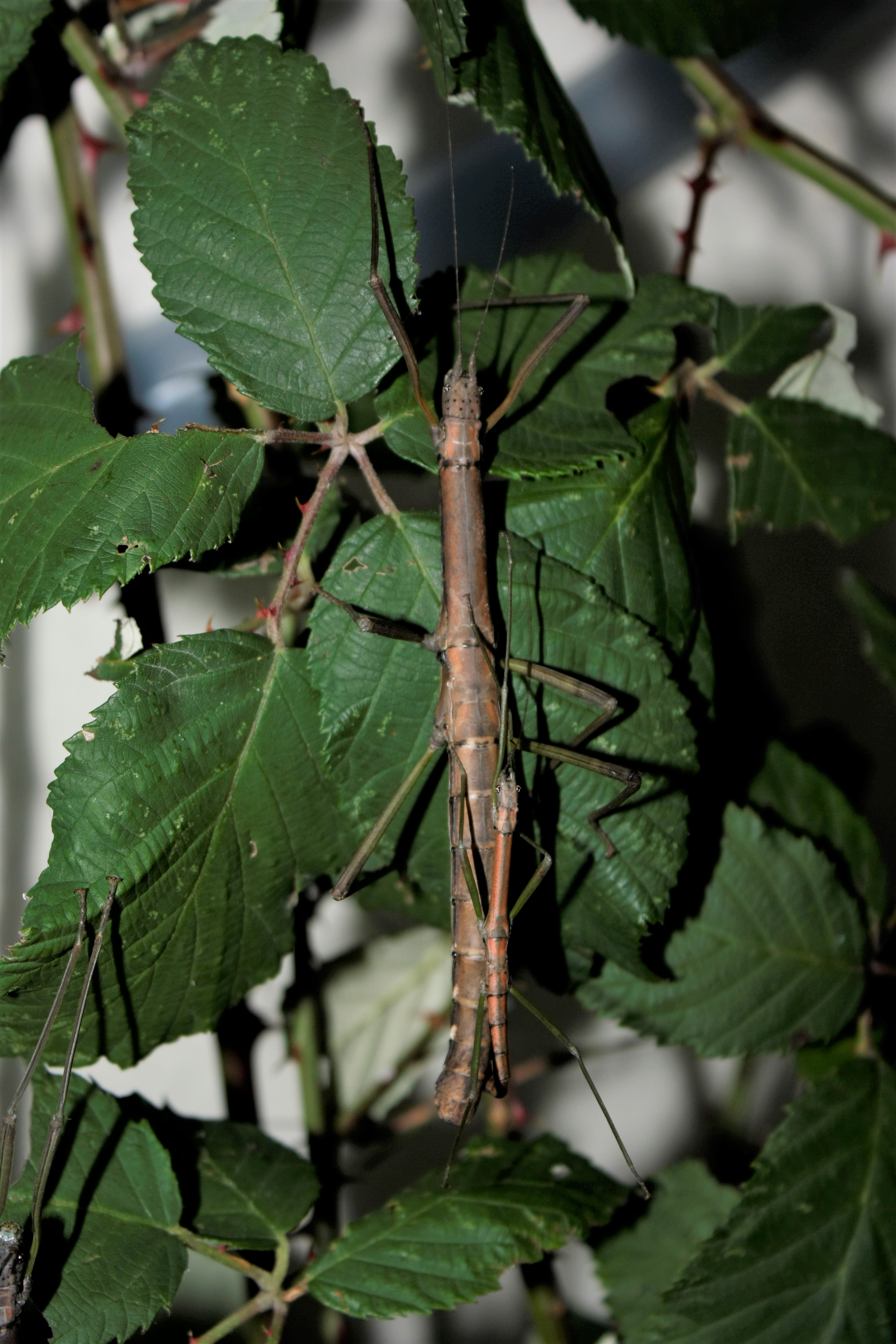
- Nuichua rabaeyae (female and male in captivity)

Scientific classification
- Domain: Eukaryota
- Kingdom: Animalia
- Phylum: Arthropoda
- Class: Insecta
- Order: Phasmatodea
- Family: Lonchodidae
- Subfamily: Necrosciinae
- Tribe: Necrosciini
- Genus: Nuichua; Bresseel & Constant, 2018

= Nuichua =

Genus of stick insects

Nuichua is a genus of Asian stick insects in the tribe Necrosciini, erected by J Bresseel and J Constant, in 2018. To date (2022) the sole species has been recorded from Vietnam.

== Species ==
The Phasmida Species File currently only includes Nuichua rabaeyae Bresseel & Constant, 2018: the genus was named after Núi Chúa National Park, where the type specimens were found.
