= Neooxyartes =

Scientific classification
- Domain: Eukaryota
- Kingdom: Animalia
- Phylum: Arthropoda
- Class: Insecta
- Order: Phasmatodea
- Family: Lonchodidae
- Subfamily: Necrosciinae
- Tribe: Necrosciini
- Genus: Neooxyartes; Ho, 2018

Synonyms
- Pterohirasea Bresseel & Constant, 2018 (as P. nigrolineata)

Genus of stick insects

External image
- male and female Neooxyartes zomproi (in culture)

Neooxyartes is a monotypic genus of Asian stick insects in the tribe Necrosciini, erected by G.W.C. Ho in 2018. To date (2022) the sole species has been recorded from Vietnam.

== Species ==
The Phasmida Species File currently only includes Neooxyartes zomproi Ho, 2018: type locality, Bạch Mã National Park (mountain), Thừa Thiên Huế province.
