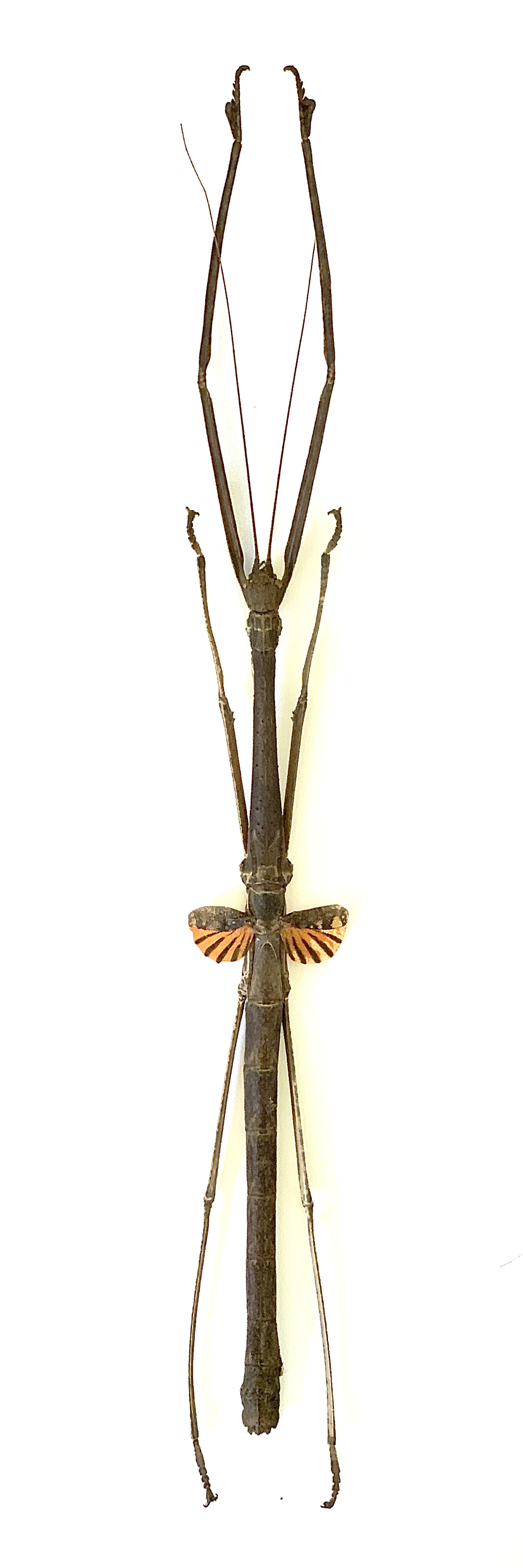
- Phaenopharos struthioneus specimen

Scientific classification
- Kingdom: Animalia
- Phylum: Arthropoda
- Clade: Pancrustacea
- Class: Insecta
- Order: Phasmatodea
- Family: Lonchodidae
- Subfamily: Necrosciinae
- Tribe: Necrosciini
- Genus: Phaenopharos; Kirby, 1904

= Phaenopharos =

Genus of phasmids

Phaenopharos is a genus of Asian stick insects belonging to the family Lonchodidae and tribe Necrosciini.

== Species ==
The Phasmida Species File includes:

1. Phaenopharos herwaardeni Hennemann, Conle & Bruckner, 1996
2. Phaenopharos khaoyaiensis Zompro, 2000
3. Phaenopharos struthioneus (Westwood, 1859) - type species (as Lopaphus struthioneus Westwood)
