= Asceles opacus =

Scientific classification
- Kingdom: Animalia
- Phylum: Arthropoda
- Class: Insecta
- Order: Phasmatodea
- Family: Lonchodidae
- Genus: Asceles
- Species: A. opacus

Binomial name
- Asceles opacus Redtenbacher, 1908

Species of stick insect

Asceles opacus, is a species of phasmid or stick insect of the genus Asceles. It is found in Sri Lanka.
