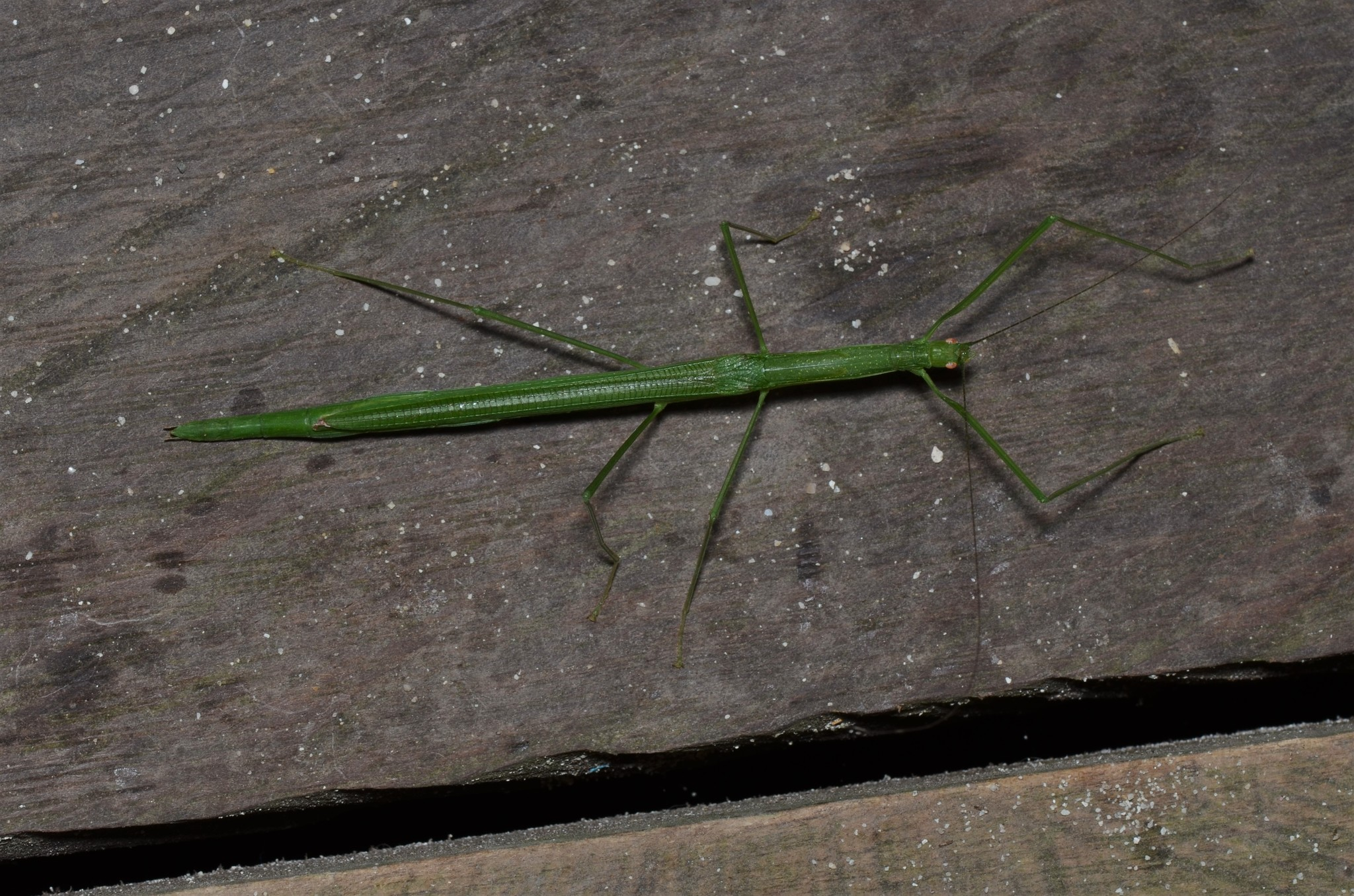
- Singaporoidea poeciloptera

Scientific classification
- Kingdom: Animalia
- Phylum: Arthropoda
- Clade: Pancrustacea
- Class: Insecta
- Order: Phasmatodea
- Family: Lonchodidae
- Subfamily: Necrosciinae
- Genus: Singaporoidea; Seow-Choen, 2017

Type species
- Singaporoidea meneptolemus (Westwood, 1859)

= Singaporoidea =

Genus of stick insects

Singaporoidea is a genus of stick insects in the family Lonchodidae. Species of the genus are found in Asia.

== Species ==
The Phasmida Species File lists:

- Singaporoidea albilateralis (Hennemann, 1998)
- Singaporoidea dolorosa (Redtenbacher, 1908)
- Singaporoidea enganensis (Giglio-Tos, 1910)
- Singaporoidea evae Seow-Choen, 2018
- Singaporoidea fruhstorferi (Günther, 1938)
- Singaporoidea gracillimus (Werner, 1934)
- Singaporoidea inconspicua (Redtenbacher, 1908)
- Singaporoidea jambia Seow-Choen, 2018
- Singaporoidea janaae (Seow-Choen, 2017)
- Singaporoidea janus (Bates, 1865)
- Singaporoidea lutea (Redtenbacher, 1908)
- Singaporoidea macra (Redtenbacher, 1908)
- Singaporoidea meneptolemus (Westwood, 1859)
- Singaporoidea nigragenua Seow-Choen, 2018
- Singaporoidea nigropunctata Seow-Choen, 2018
- Singaporoidea normalis (Redtenbacher, 1908)
- Singaporoidea nurulae Seow-Choen, 2020
- Singaporoidea planicercata (Redtenbacher, 1908)
- Singaporoidea poeciloptera (Rehn, 1904)
- Singaporoidea pseudosipylus (Redtenbacher, 1908)
- Singaporoidea pumila (Werner, 1934)
- Singaporoidea shifui (Seow-Choen, 2016)
- Singaporoidea tenella (Günther, 1935)
