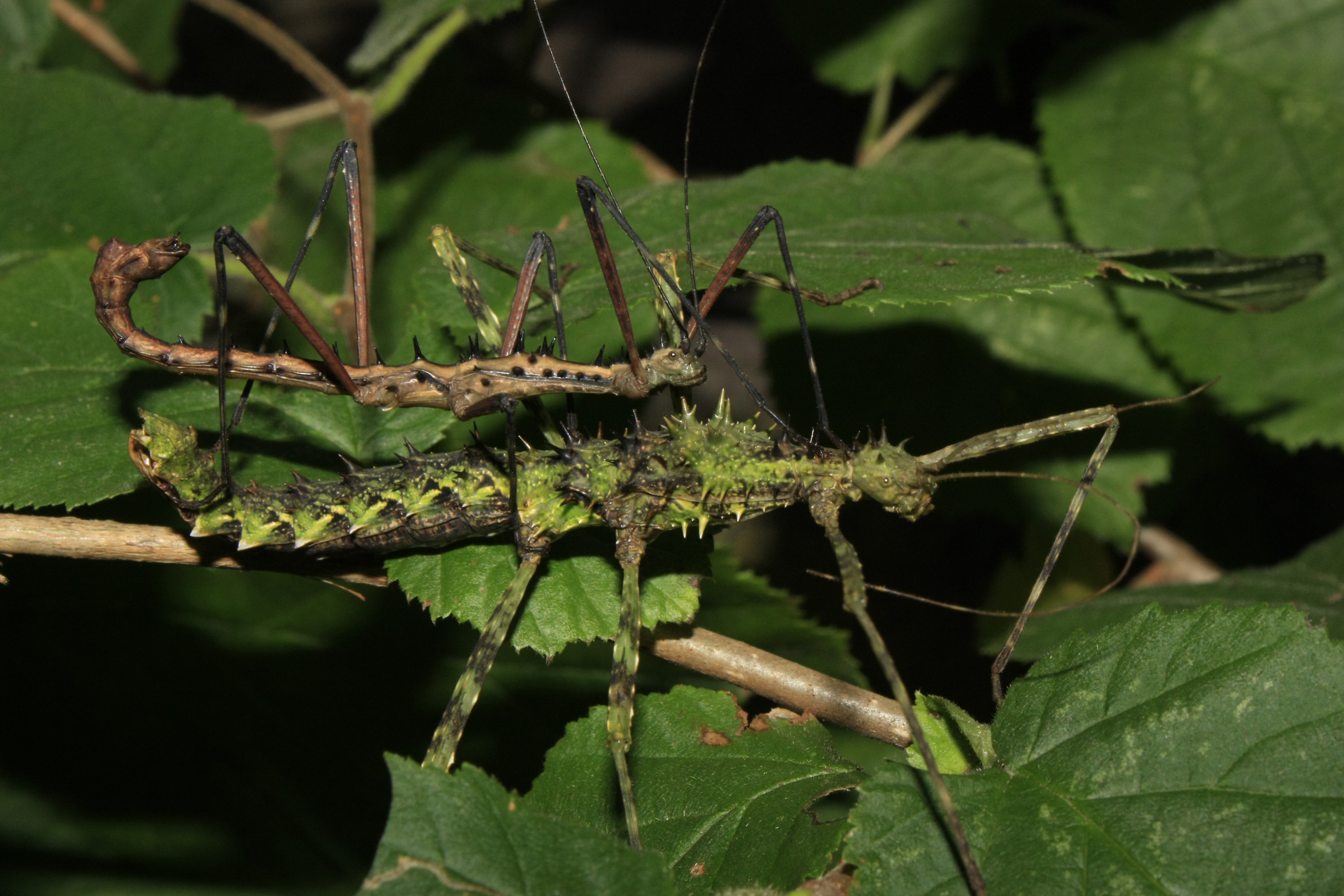
- Andropromachus scutatus: male and female (in captivity)

Scientific classification
- Kingdom: Animalia
- Phylum: Arthropoda
- Class: Insecta
- Order: Phasmatodea
- Family: Lonchodidae
- Subfamily: Necrosciinae
- Tribe: Necrosciini
- Genus: Andropromachus; Carl, 1913

Synonyms
- Spiniphasma Chen & He, 2000

= Andropromachus =

Genus of stick insects

Andropromachus is a genus of Asian stick insects in the tribe Necrosciini, erected by Johann Carl in 1913. Species have been recorded from south-western China and northern Vietnam.

== Species ==
The Phasmida Species File lists:

1. Andropromachus bicolor (Kirby, 1904)
2. Andropromachus guangxiense (Chen & He, 2000)
3. Andropromachus gulinqingensis Xie & Qian, 2022
4. Andropromachus scutatus Carl, 1913 - type species
5. Andropromachus tonkinensis (Brunner von Wattenwyl, 1907)
6. Andropromachus ynau Gao, Huang, Wang, Xie & Li, 2022
