= Pachyscia =

Scientific classification
- Kingdom: Animalia
- Phylum: Arthropoda
- Clade: Pancrustacea
- Class: Insecta
- Order: Phasmatodea
- Family: Lonchodidae
- Subfamily: Necrosciinae
- Tribe: Necrosciini
- Genus: Pachyscia; Redtenbacher, 1908

Genus of stick insects

External image
- Images at iNaturalist

Pachyscia is a genus of Asian stick insects in the tribe Necrosciini, erected by Josef Redtenbacher in 1908. Species have been recorded from Vietnam and China.

== Species ==
The Phasmida Species File lists:

1. Pachyscia bipunctata Redtenbacher, 1908
2. Pachyscia dilatata (Chen & He, 2004)
3. Pachyscia hainanensis Ho, 2013
4. Pachyscia heishidingensis Ho, 2012
5. Pachyscia longicauda (Bi, 1990)
6. Pachyscia plagiata Redtenbacher, 1908 - type species (by subsequent designation: multiple localities in Vietnam)
7. Pachyscia quadriguttata (Chen & He, 1996)
