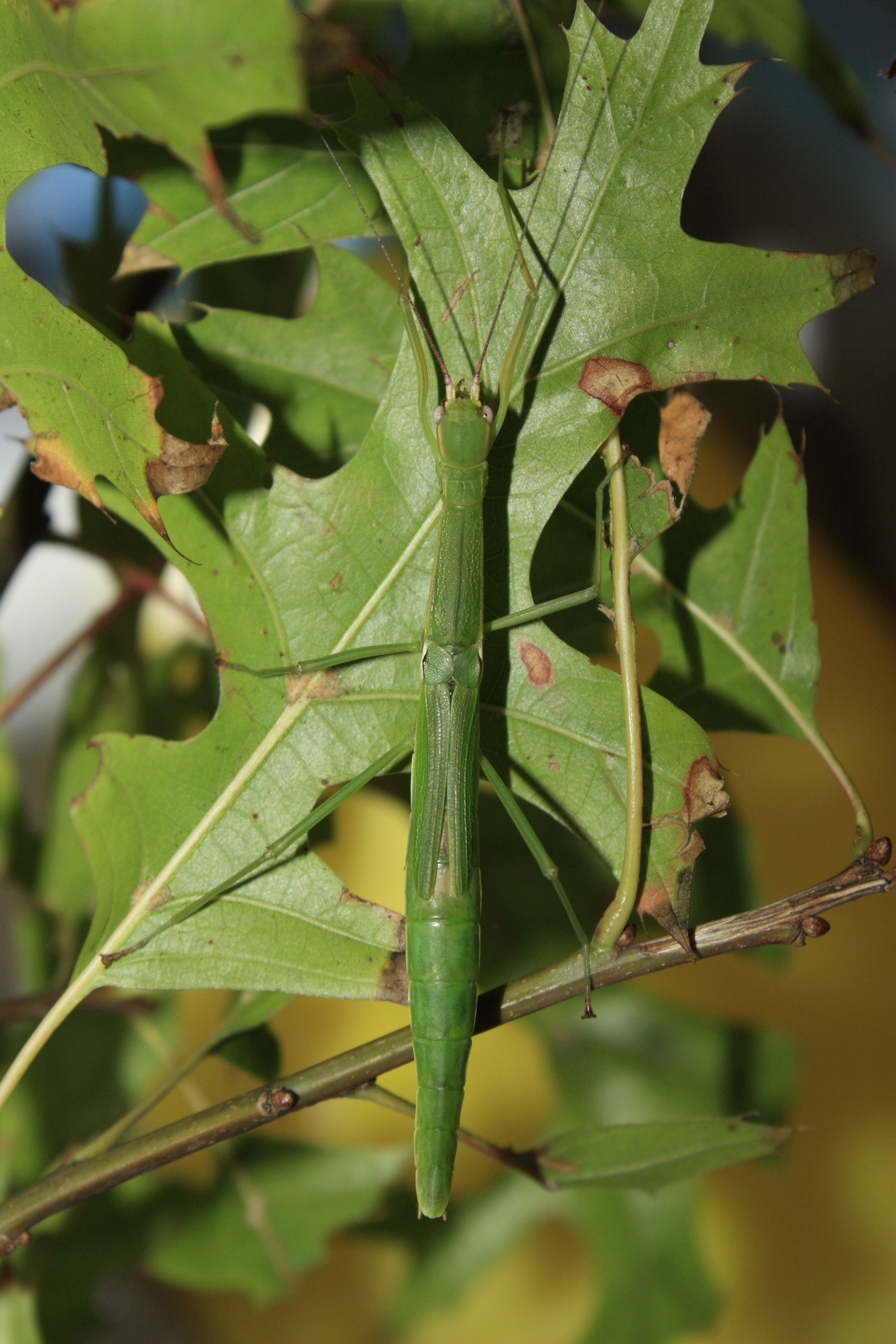
- Micadina phluctainoides (female)

Scientific classification
- Domain: Eukaryota
- Kingdom: Animalia
- Phylum: Arthropoda
- Class: Insecta
- Order: Phasmatodea
- Family: Lonchodidae
- Subfamily: Necrosciinae
- Tribe: Necrosciini
- Genus: Micadina; Redtenbacher, 1908

= Micadina =

Genus of stick insects

Micadina is a genus of stick insects in the tribe Necrosciini, erected by Josef Redtenbacher in 1908. Species have been recorded from temperate and subtropical Asia, including China, Japan, Korea and Vietnam.

== Species ==
The Phasmida Species File lists:

1. Micadina bilobata Liu & Cai, 1994
2. Micadina brachyptera Liu & Cai, 1994
3. Micadina brevioperculina Bi, 1992
4. Micadina cheni Ho, 2012
5. Micadina conifera Chen & He, 1997
6. Micadina difficilis Günther, 1940
7. Micadina fujianensis Liu & Cai, 1994
8. Micadina involuta Günther, 1940
9. Micadina phluctainoides (Rehn, 1904) - type species (as Marmessoidea phluctainoides JAG Rehn)
10. Micadina reni Ho, 2013
11. Micadina sonani Shiraki, 1935
12. Micadina songxiaobini Ho, 2017
13. Micadina vietnamensis Ho, 2018
14. Micadina yasumatsui Shiraki, 1935
15. Micadina yingdensis Chen & He, 1992
16. Micadina zhejiangensis Chen & He, 1995
