= Maculonecroscia =

Scientific classification
- Domain: Eukaryota
- Kingdom: Animalia
- Phylum: Arthropoda
- Class: Insecta
- Order: Phasmatodea
- Family: Lonchodidae
- Subfamily: Necrosciinae
- Tribe: Necrosciini
- Genus: Maculonecroscia; Seow-Choen, 2016

Genus of stick insects

External image
- Maculonecroscia shukayi at iNaturalist

Maculonecroscia is a genus of stick insects in the tribe Necrosciini, erected by F Seow-Choen in 2016. Species distribution records are probably incomplete, but include India, China, Indochina (Vietnam) and west Malesia.

== Species ==
The Phasmida Species File lists:

1. Maculonecroscia braggi Seow-Choen, 2016 - type species
2. Maculonecroscia heros (Redtenbacher, 1908)
3. Maculonecroscia menaka (Wood-Mason, 1877)
4. Maculonecroscia perplexus (Redtenbacher, 1908)
5. Maculonecroscia shukayi (Bi, Zhang & Lau, 2001)
