= Acacus =

Acacus can refer to:

- Acacus (mythology), King of Arcadia, and the foster-father of the infant Hermes in Greek mythology
- Acacus (phasmid), a genus of phasmids in the family Diapheromeridae
- Tadrart Acacus, a region and mountain range in southwestern Libya
