= Pomposa moesta =

Scientific classification
- Domain: Eukaryota
- Kingdom: Animalia
- Phylum: Arthropoda
- Class: Insecta
- Order: Phasmatodea
- Family: Lonchodidae
- Genus: Pomposa; Redtenbacher, 1908
- Species: P. moesta

Binomial name
- Pomposa moesta Redtenbacher, 1908

Species of insect

Pomposa is a monotypic genus of phasmids belonging to the tribe Necrosciini. The only species is Pomposa moesta from Sabah.
