= Acacus (phasmid) =

Scientific classification
- Domain: Eukaryota
- Kingdom: Animalia
- Phylum: Arthropoda
- Class: Insecta
- Order: Phasmatodea
- Family: Lonchodidae
- Tribe: Necrosciini
- Genus: Acacus; Brunner von Wattenwyl, 1907

Genus of insects

Acacus is a genus of phasmids belonging to the tribe Necrosciini.

The species of this genus are found in Southeastern Asia.

Species:

- Acacus braggi Hennemann & Conle, 2003
- Acacus rufipectus Brunner von Wattenwyl, 1907
- Acacus sapuani Seow-Choen, 2016
- Acacus sarawacus (Westwood, 1859)
