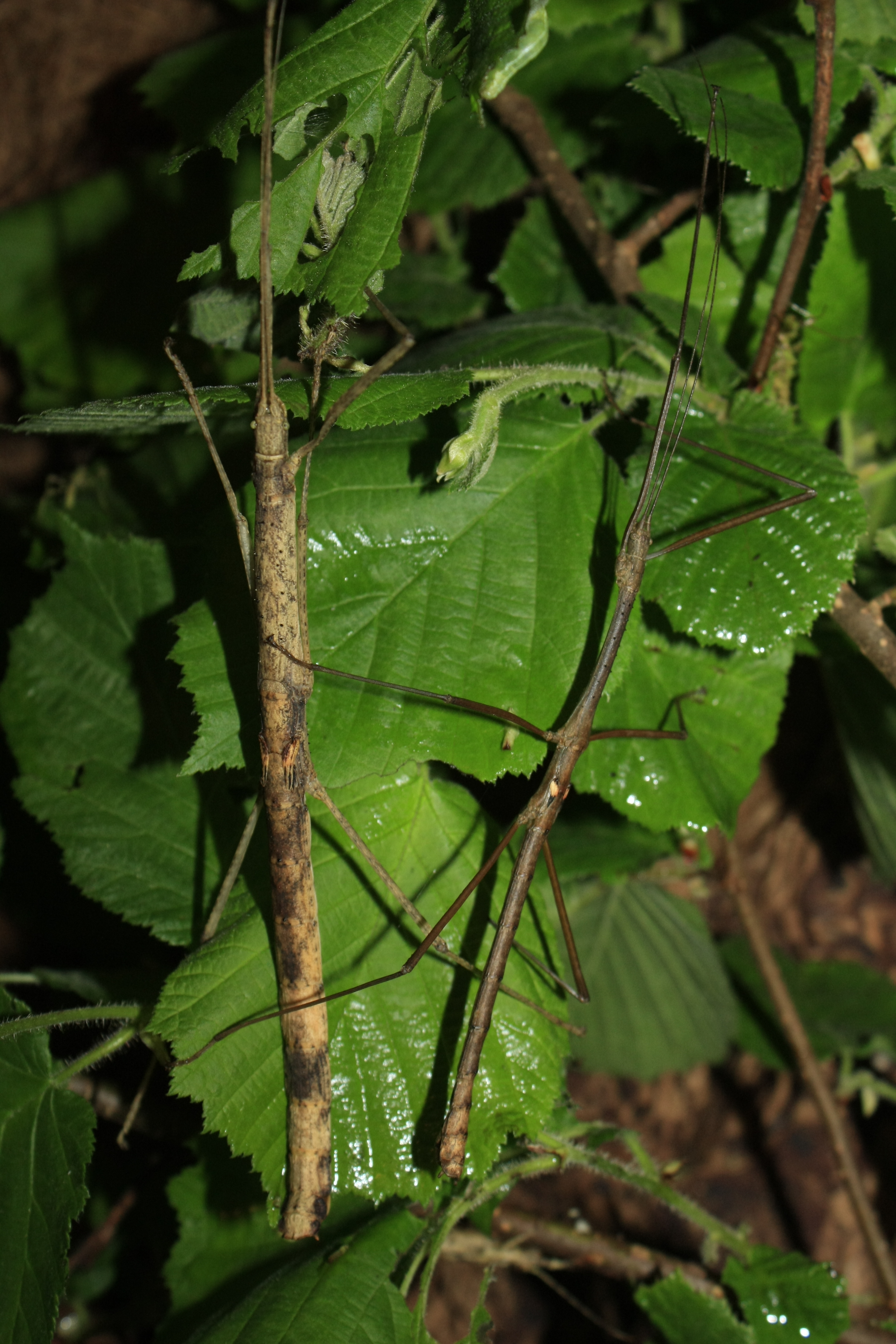
- Oxyartes spinipennis: female and male (in culture)

Scientific classification
- Kingdom: Animalia
- Phylum: Arthropoda
- Clade: Pancrustacea
- Class: Insecta
- Order: Phasmatodea
- Family: Lonchodidae
- Subfamily: Necrosciinae
- Genus: Oxyartes; Stål, 1875

= Oxyartes (insect) =

Genus of stick insects

External image
- Image at iNaturalist

Oxyartes is a genus of stick insects in the family Lonchodidae and tribe Necrosciini; species records are from India through to Indochina.

== Species ==
As of November 2026, the Phasmida Species File includes:

1. Oxyartes cresphontes (Westwood, 1859)
2. Oxyartes densigranulatus Ho, 2020
3. Oxyartes despectus (Westwood, 1848) - type species (as Phasma despectum Westwood)
4. Oxyartes dorsalis Chen & He, 2008
5. Oxyartes guangdongensis Chen & He, 2008
6. Oxyartes jinpingensis Ho, 2017
7. Oxyartes lamellatus Kirby, 1904
8. Oxyartes nigrigranulatus Ho, 2020
9. Oxyartes rubris Ho, 2017
10. Oxyartes sparsispinosus Ho, 2020
11. Oxyartes spinipennis Carl, 1913
12. Oxyartes spinulosus Redtenbacher, 1908
13. Oxyartes vietnamensis Ho, 2018
14. Oxyartes xishuangbannaensis Ho, 2020
15. Oxyartes yunnanus Chen & He, 2008
