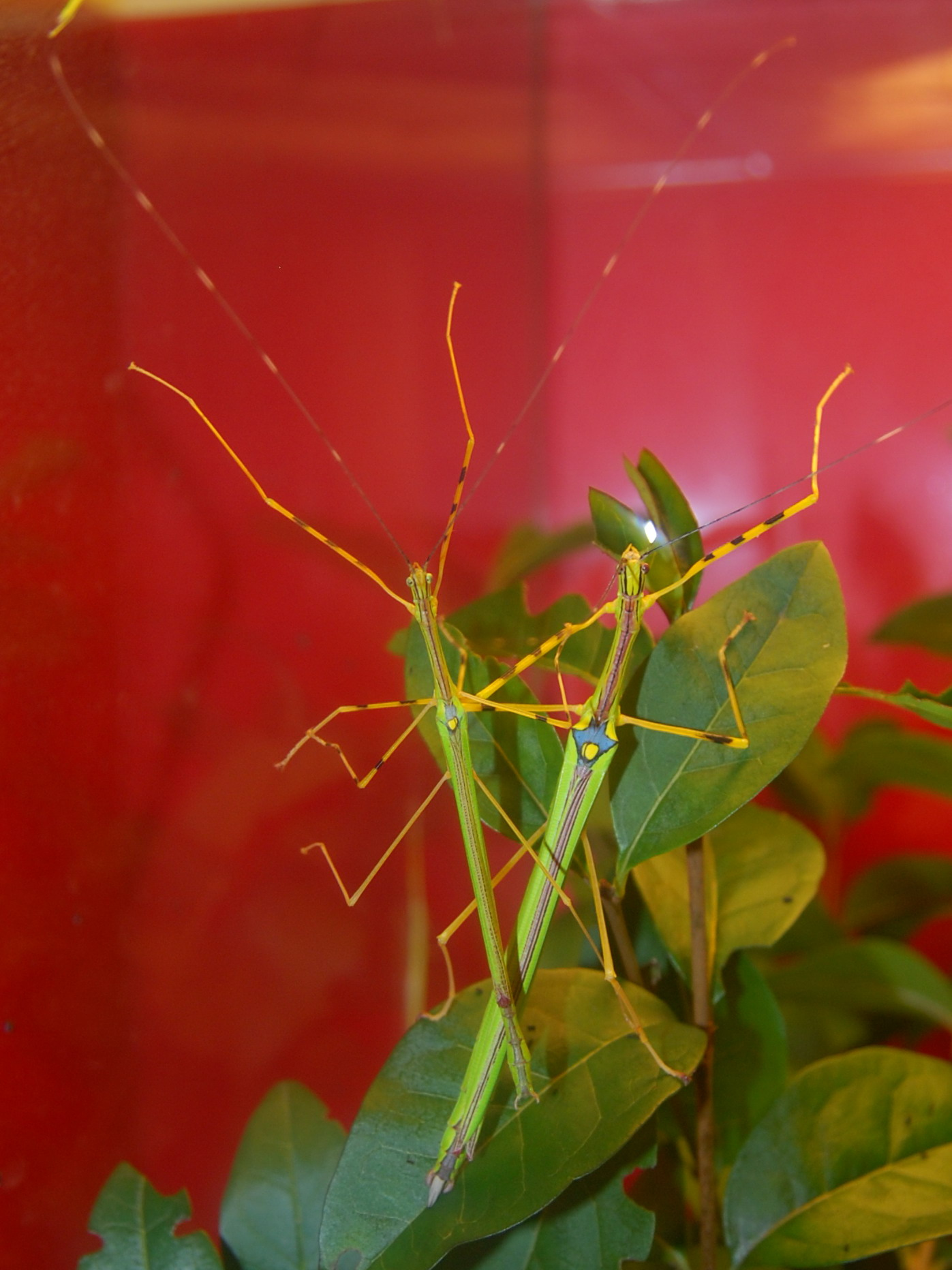
- Necroscia annulipes

Scientific classification
- Kingdom: Animalia
- Phylum: Arthropoda
- Class: Insecta
- Order: Phasmatodea
- Family: Lonchodidae
- Tribe: Necrosciini
- Genus: Necroscia; Serville, 1838

Type species
- Necroscia prasina (Burmeister, 1838)

Synonyms
- Aruanoidea Brunner von Wattenwyl, 1893

= Necroscia =

Genus of stick insects

Necroscia is an Asian genus of stick insects in the family Lonchodidae and tribe Necrosciini. Species have been recorded from South-East Asia.

== Species ==
The Phasmida Species File list:

- Necroscia adspersa (Redtenbacher, 1908)
- Necroscia affinis (Gray, 1835)
- Necroscia analis (Redtenbacher, 1908)
- Necroscia andii Seow-Choen, 2018
- Necroscia aruana Westwood, 1859
- Necroscia biguttacephala Seow-Choen, 2018
- Necroscia brunneri Kirby, 1904
- Necroscia ceres Stål, 1877
- Necroscia chloris Audinet-Serville, 1838
- Necroscia chlorotica Audinet-Serville, 1838
- Necroscia confusa (Redtenbacher, 1908)
- Necroscia connexa (Redtenbacher, 1908)
- Necroscia conspersa Stål, 1877
- Necroscia davidis (Le Guillou, 1841)
- Necroscia dianica Ho, 2017
- Necroscia distincta Brancsik, 1898
- Necroscia edybhaskarai Seow-Choen, 2018
- Necroscia eucerca Stål, 1877
- Necroscia fasciolata Stål, 1877
- Necroscia fatua Stål, 1877
- Necroscia flavescens (Chen & Wang, 1998)
- Necroscia flavogranulosa Günther, 1943
- Necroscia flavoguttulata (Redtenbacher, 1908)
- Necroscia frondosa Bates, 1865
- Necroscia haanii Kirby, 1904
- Necroscia hainanensis (Chen & He, 2002)
- Necroscia hariola (Günther, 1935)
- Necroscia horsfieldii Kirby, 1904
- Necroscia inflexipes (Olivier, 1792)
- Necroscia ingenua (Redtenbacher, 1908)
- Necroscia involutecercata (Redtenbacher, 1908)
- Necroscia ischnotegmina Bragg, 2005
- Necroscia khoonmengi Seow-Choen, 2016
- Necroscia kotatinggia Brock, 1999
- Necroscia lacteipennis Bates, 1865
- Necroscia laterala Seow-Choen, 2018
- Necroscia lehi Seow-Choen, 2016
- Necroscia maculiceps Stål, 1877
- Necroscia malleoformia Hennemann, 2021
- Necroscia manicata (Lichtenstein, 1802)
- Necroscia mista (Chen & He, 2008)
- Necroscia multicolor (Redtenbacher, 1908)
- Necroscia munda (Redtenbacher, 1908)
- Necroscia nasiri Seow-Choen, 2018
- Necroscia nigrofasciata (Redtenbacher, 1908)
- Necroscia notata (Chen & Zhang, 2008)
- Necroscia nuda Seow-Choen, 2018
- Necroscia ohli Seow-Choen, 2017
- Necroscia pallida (Redtenbacher, 1908)
- Necroscia philippina Redtenbacher, 1908
- Necroscia pirithous Westwood, 1859
- Necroscia prasina (Burmeister, 1838)
- Necroscia punctata (Gray, 1835)
- Necroscia randolfae Seow-Choen, 2016
- Necroscia robustior (Redtenbacher, 1908)
- Necroscia rosenbergii Kaup, 1871
- Necroscia simplex (Redtenbacher, 1908)
- Necroscia stali (Redtenbacher, 1908)
- Necroscia sukriadii Seow-Choen, 2018
- Necroscia thisbe Stål, 1877
- Necroscia tibangensis (Günther, 1935)
- Necroscia tonquinensis Kirby, 1904
- Necroscia tujuha Seow-Choen, 2018
- Necroscia virens Stål, 1877
- Necroscia vittata Audinet-Serville, 1838
- Necroscia westwoodi Kirby, 1904
- Necroscia zomproi Seow-Choen, 2016
