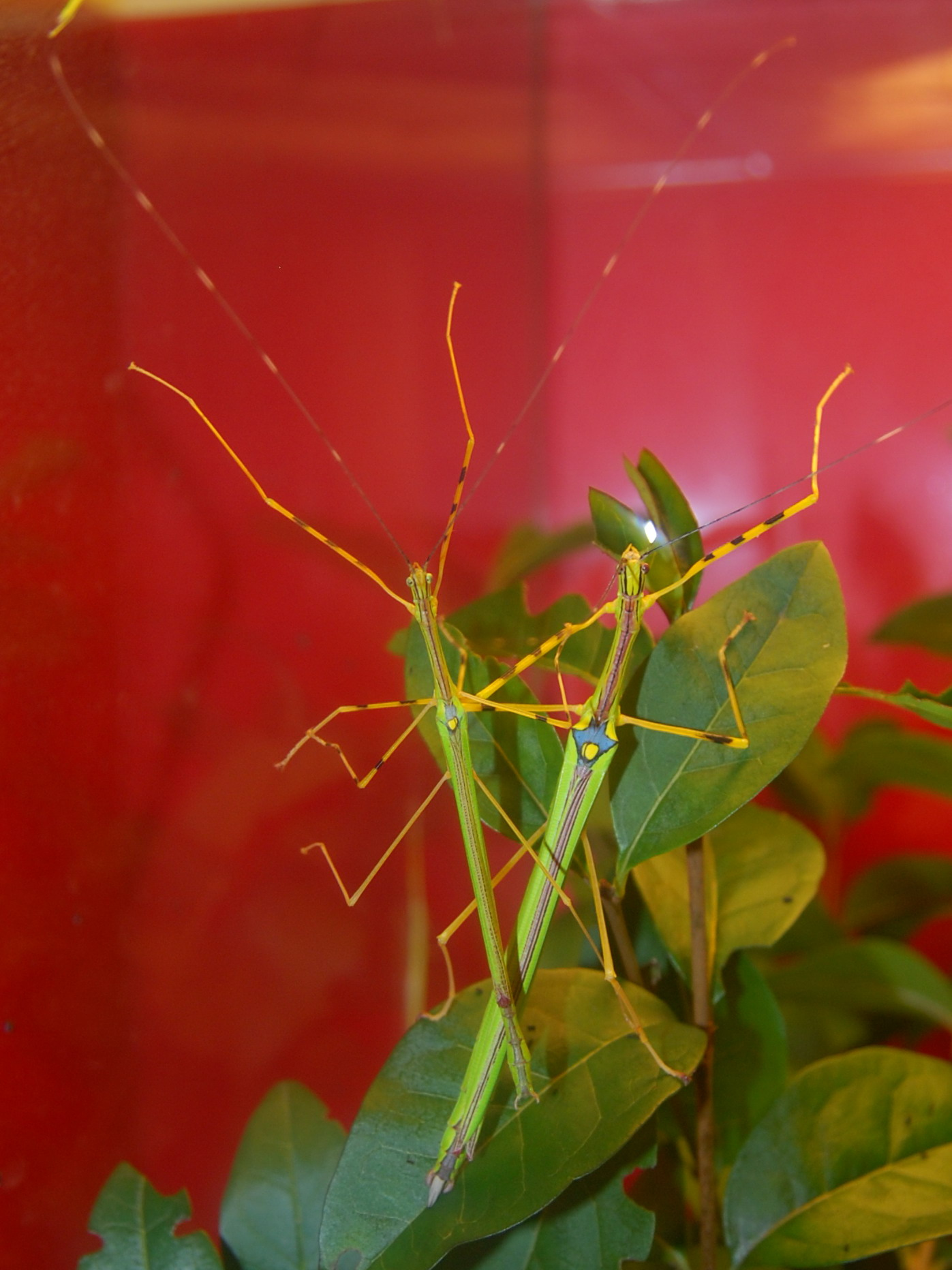
- Necroscia annulipes

Scientific classification
- Kingdom: Animalia
- Phylum: Arthropoda
- Clade: Pancrustacea
- Class: Insecta
- Order: Phasmatodea
- Family: Lonchodidae
- Subfamily: Necrosciinae; Brunner von Wattenwyl, 1893

= Necrosciinae =

Subfamily of stick insects

Necrosciinae is a subfamily of the stick insect family Lonchodidae, based on the type genus Necroscia; its greatest diversity in South-East Asia.

The subfamilies Necrosciinae and Lonchodinae, formerly part of Diapheromeridae, were determined to make up a separate family and were transferred to the re-established family Lonchodidae in 2018.

== Genera ==
The Phasmida Species File includes the genera below; most belong to the tribe Necrosciini Brunner von Wattenwyl, 1893:

=== Korinnini ===
Auth.: Günther, 1953

1. Kalocorinnis Günther, 1944 (Borneo, peninsular Malaysia, Sumatra)
2. Korinnis Günther, 1932 (India, Thailand, Malesia)

=== Necrosciini ===
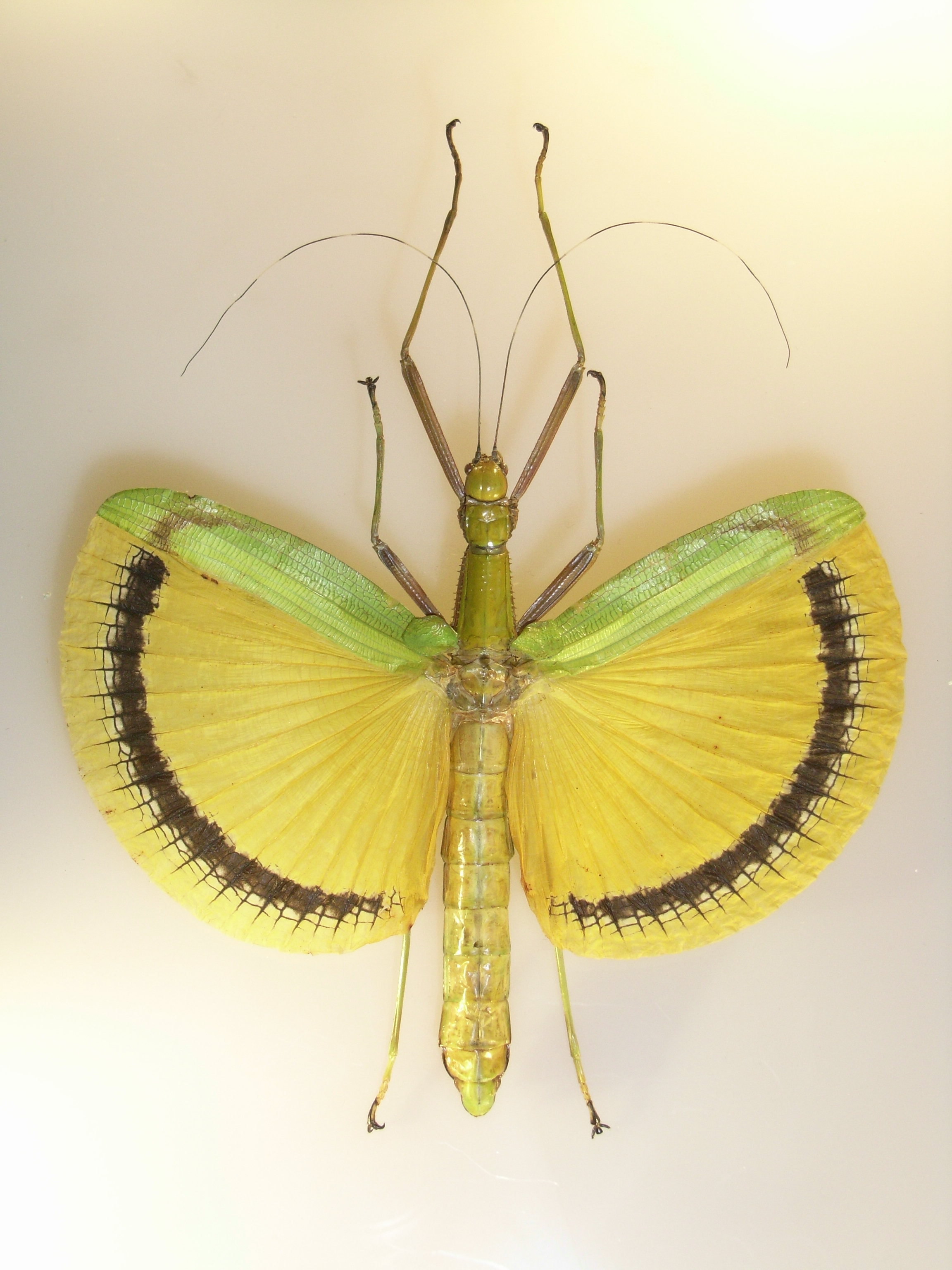
Yellow umbrella stick insect (Eurynecrosia nigrofasciata)

1. Acacus Brunner von Wattenwyl, 1907
2. Acanthophasma Chen & He, 2000
3. Anarchodes Redtenbacher, 1908
4. Anasceles Redtenbacher, 1908
5. Andropromachus Carl, 1913
6. Asceles Redtenbacher, 1908
7. Aschiphasmodes Karny, 1923
8. Asystata Redtenbacher, 1908
9. Austrosipyloidea Brock & Hasenpusch, 2007
10. Brevinecroscia Seow-Choen, 2016
11. Brockphasma Ho, 2014
12. Calvisia Stål, 1875
13. Candovia Stål, 1875
14. Capuyanus Bresseel & Constant, 2017
15. Caudasceles Seow-Choen, 2017
16. Centrophasma Redtenbacher, 1908
17. Channia Seow-Choen, 2016
18. Cheniphasma Ho, 2012
19. Conlephasma Gottardo & Heller, 2012
20. Conogalactea Seow-Choen, 2018
21. Cornicandovia Hasenpusch & Brock, 2007
22. Cylindomena Günther, 1935
23. Dendrochroma Bresseel, Constant, Cumming & Pham, 2025
24. Diacanthoidea Redtenbacher, 1908
25. Diangelus Brunner von Wattenwyl, 1907
26. Dianphasma Chen & He, 1997
27. Diardia Redtenbacher, 1908
28. Diesbachia Redtenbacher, 1908
29. Elicius Günther, 1935
30. Eurynecroscia Dohrn, 1910
31. Galactea Redtenbacher, 1908
32. Gargantuoidea Redtenbacher, 1908
33. Gibbernecroscia Brock, Hasenpusch & Petrović, 2019
34. Hemiplasta Redtenbacher, 1908
35. Hemisosibia Redtenbacher, 1908
36. Hennemannia Seow-Choen, 2016
37. Huananphasma Ho, 2013
38. Indosipyloidea Seow-Choen, 2023
39. Labanphasma Seow-Choen, 2016
40. Laevediacantha Seow-Choen, 2016
41. Lamachodes Redtenbacher, 1908
42. Lobonecroscia Brock & Seow-Choen, 2000
43. Lopaphus Westwood, 1859
44. Loxopsis Westwood, 1859
45. Macrocercius Seow-Choen, 2017
46. Maculonecroscia Seow-Choen, 2016
47. Malandella Sjöstedt, 1918
48. Marmessoidea Brunner von Wattenwyl, 1893
49. Meionecroscia Redtenbacher, 1908
50. Mesaner Redtenbacher, 1908
51. Micadina Redtenbacher, 1908
52. Moritasgus Günther, 1935
53. Mycovartes Bresseel & Constant, 2024
54. Necroscia Audinet-Serville, 1838
55. Neoasceles Seow-Choen, 2016
56. Neoclides Uvarov, 1940
57. Neohirasea Rehn, 1904
58. Neointerphasma Ho, 2017
59. Neonescicroa Seow-Choen, 2016
60. Neooxyartes Ho, 2018
61. Neoparamenexenus Ho, 2025
62. Neoqiongphasma Ho, 2013
63. Neososibia Chen & He, 2000
64. Nescicroa Karny, 1923
65. Notaspinius Seow-Choen, 2017
66. Nuichua Bresseel & Constant, 2018
67. Oedohirasea Ho, 2020
68. Orthonecroscia Kirby, 1904
69. Orthostheneboea Seow-Choen, 2016
70. Orxines Stål, 1875
71. Otraleus Günther, 1935
72. Ovacephala Seow-Choen, 2016
73. Oxyartes Stål, 1875
74. Pachyscia Redtenbacher, 1908
75. Paracandovia Forni, Cussigh, Brock, Jones, Nicolini, Martelossi, Luchetti & Mantovani, 2022
76. Paradiacantha Redtenbacher, 1908
77. Paraloxopsis Günther, 1932
78. Paramarmessoidea Seow-Choen, 2021
79. Paramenexenus Redtenbacher, 1908
80. Paranecroscia Redtenbacher, 1908
81. Paraprosceles Chen & He, 2004
82. Parasinophasma Chen & He, 2006
83. Parasipyloidea Redtenbacher, 1908
84. Parasosibia Redtenbacher, 1908
85. Parastheneboea Redtenbacher, 1908
86. Paroxyartes Carl, 1913
87. Phaenopharos Kirby, 1904
88. Phamartes Bresseel & Constant, 2013
89. Planososibia Seow-Choen, 2016
90. Platysosibia Redtenbacher, 1908
91. Pomposa moesta Redtenbacher, 1908 (monotypic genus)
92. Pseudocentema Chen, He & Li, 2002
93. Pseudodiacantha Redtenbacher, 1908
94. Pseudoneoclides Seow-Choen, 2016
95. Pseudoparamenexenus Ho, 2016
96. Pseudosipyloidea Ho, 2013
97. Pseudososibia Ho, 2017
98. Qiongphasma Chen, He & Li, 2002
99. Rhamphosipyloidea Redtenbacher, 1908
100. Sabahphasma Seow-Choen, 2016
101. Scionecra Karny, 1923
102. Septopenna Seow-Choen, 2016
103. Singaporoidea Seow-Choen, 2017
104. Sinohirasea Ho, 2025
105. Sinophasma Günther, 1940
106. Sipyloidea Brunner von Wattenwyl, 1893
107. Sosibia Stål, 1875
108. Spinohirasea Zompro, 2002
109. Spinomarmessoidea Seow-Choen, 2021
110. Spinosipyloidea Hasenpusch & Brock, 2007
111. Sukabumidea Seow-Choen, 2023
112. Sumatranius Seow-Choen, 2018
113. Syringodes Redtenbacher, 1908
114. Taiphasma Ho, 2026
115. Tagesoidea Redtenbacher, 1908
116. Thrasyllus macilentus Stål, 1877 (monotypic genus)
117. Trachythorax Redtenbacher, 1908
118. Varieganecroscia Seow-Choen, 2016
