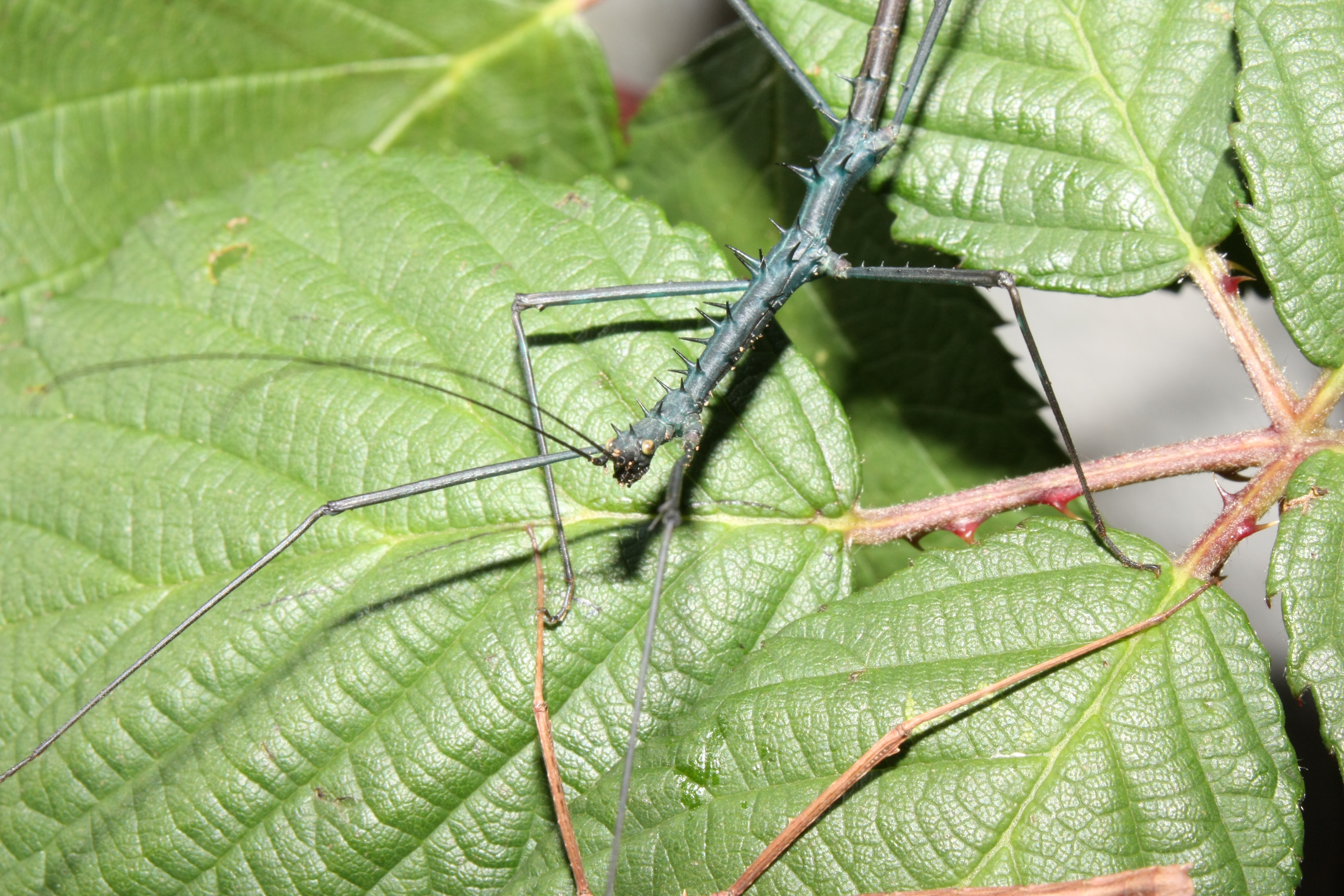
- Acanthomenexenus polyacanthus (Lonchodini)

Scientific classification
- Kingdom: Animalia
- Phylum: Arthropoda
- Class: Insecta
- Order: Phasmatodea
- Infraorder: Anareolatae
- Family: Lonchodidae; Brunner von Wattenwyl, 1893

= Lonchodidae =

Family of stick insects

Lonchodidae is a family of stick insects, with more than 150 genera and 1,000 described species.

The subfamilies Necrosciinae and Lonchodinae, formerly part of Diapheromeridae, were determined to make up a separate family and were transferred to the re-established family Lonchodidae in 2018.

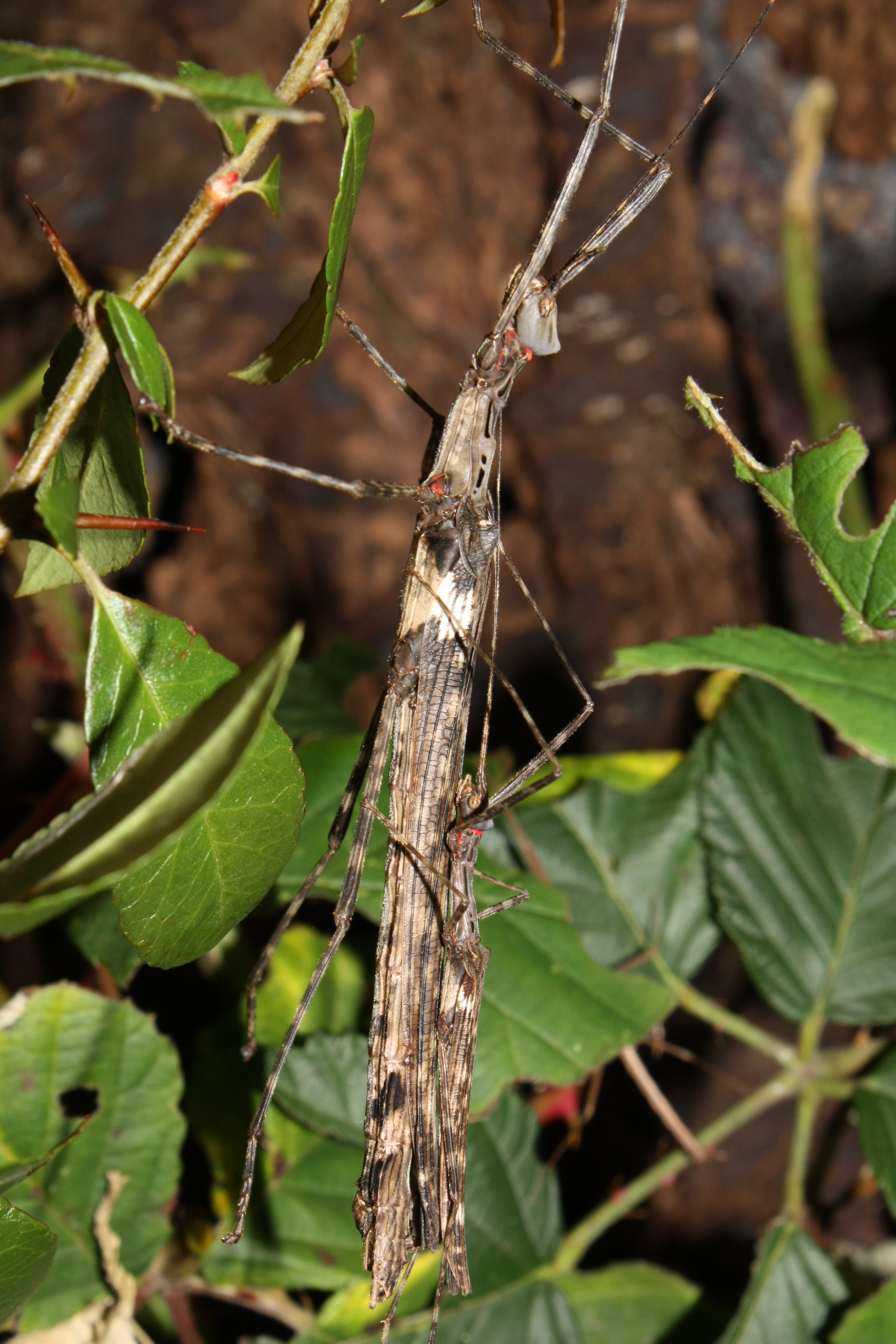
Trachythorax maculicollis (Necrosciini)

== Subfamilies and tribes ==
- Lonchodinae Brunner von Wattenwyl, 1893
  - tribe Eurycanthini Brunner von Wattenwyl, 1893
  - tribe Lonchodini Brunner von Wattenwyl, 1893
  - tribe not determined
    - genus Megalophasma Bi, 1995
    - genus Papuacocelus Hennemann & Conle, 2006
- Necrosciinae Brunner von Wattenwyl, 1893
  - tribe Necrosciini Brunner von Wattenwyl, 1893
