= List of phasmids of Sri Lanka =

Sri Lanka is a tropical island situated close to the southern tip of India. The invertebrate fauna is as large as it is common to other regions of the world. There are about 2 million species of arthropods found in the world, and still it is counting. So many new species are discover up to this time also. So it is very complicated and difficult to summarize the exact number of species found within a certain region.

The following list is about Phasmids recorded in Sri Lanka.

== Phasmid ==
Phylum: Arthropoda
Class: Insecta
Order: Phasmatodea

The Phasmatodea (also known as Phasmida or Phasmatoptera) are an order of insects, whose members are variously known as stick insects (in Europe and Australasia), stick-bugs or walking sticks (in the United States and Canada), phasmids, ghost insects and leaf insects (generally the family Phylliidae). The group's name is derived from the Ancient Greek φάσμα phasma, meaning an apparition or phantom, referring to the resemblance of many species to sticks or leaves. Their natural camouflage makes them difficult for predators to detect, but many species have a secondary line of defence in the form of startle displays, spines or toxic secretions. The genus Phobaeticus includes the world's longest insects.

The classification of the Phasmatodea is complex and the relationships between its members are poorly understood. Furthermore, there is much confusion over the ordinal name. Phasmida is preferred by many authors, though it is incorrectly formed; Phasmatodea is correctly formed, and is widely accepted. The order is divided into two, or sometimes three, suborders.

The following list provide the phasmids currently identified in Sri Lanka. Major works on Sri Lankan phasmids were done by Henneman in 2002. Before his taxonomic works, it was noted that there are 85 species within the country. After extensive studies by Henneman in 2002 during field works from four locations around central hills, he revised the exact number of species found in Sri Lanka, where he found synonyms specimens and few new species as well. According to Henneman checklist, there are 69 accepted species can be seen in Sri Lanka.

Endemic species are denoted as E.

=== Family: Aschiphasmatidae ===
- Abrosoma exiguum
- Abrosoma nebulosum
- Abrosoma virescens

=== Family: Diapheromeridae ===
- Asceles opacus
- Charmides cerberus
- Lopaphus srilankensis
- Miniphasma prima
- Miniphasma secunda
- Paramenexenus ceylonicus
- Paramenexenus inconspicuus
- Paramenexenus subalienus
- Paraprisomera coronata
- Paraprisomera taprobanae
- Parasipyloidea minuta
- Parasipyloidea seiferti
- Parasipyloidea zehntneri
- Parasosibia ceylonica
- Parasosibia incerta
- Sceptrophasma humilis
- Sipyloidea acutipennis
- Sipyloidea bistriolata
- Sipyloidea ceylonica
- Sipyloidea panaetius
- Sipyloidea sipylus
- Sosibia passalus
- Sosibia quadrispinosa
- Trachythorax expallescens
- Trachythorax sparaxes

=== Family: Phasmatidae ===
- Cuniculina cunicula
- Cuniculina obnoxia
- Lonchodes denticauda
- Lonchodes femoralis
- Lonchodes flavicornis
- Lonchodes praon
- Paraprisomera coronata
- Paraprisomera taprobanae
- Phobaeticus hypharpax
- Phobaeticus lobulatus
- Prisomera auscultator
- Prisomera cyllabacum
- Prisomera ignava
- Prisomera mimas
- Prisomera spinicollis
- Prisomera spinosissimum
- Ramulus ablutus
- Ramulus braggi
- Ramulus ceylonense
- Ramulus lineaticeps
- Ramulus lobulatus
- Ramulus pseudoporus
- Ramulus trilineatus

=== Family: Phylliidae - Leaf insects ===
- Phyllium athanysus
- Phyllium bioculatum
- Phyllium brevipenne
- Phyllium geryon
- Phyllium hausleithneri
