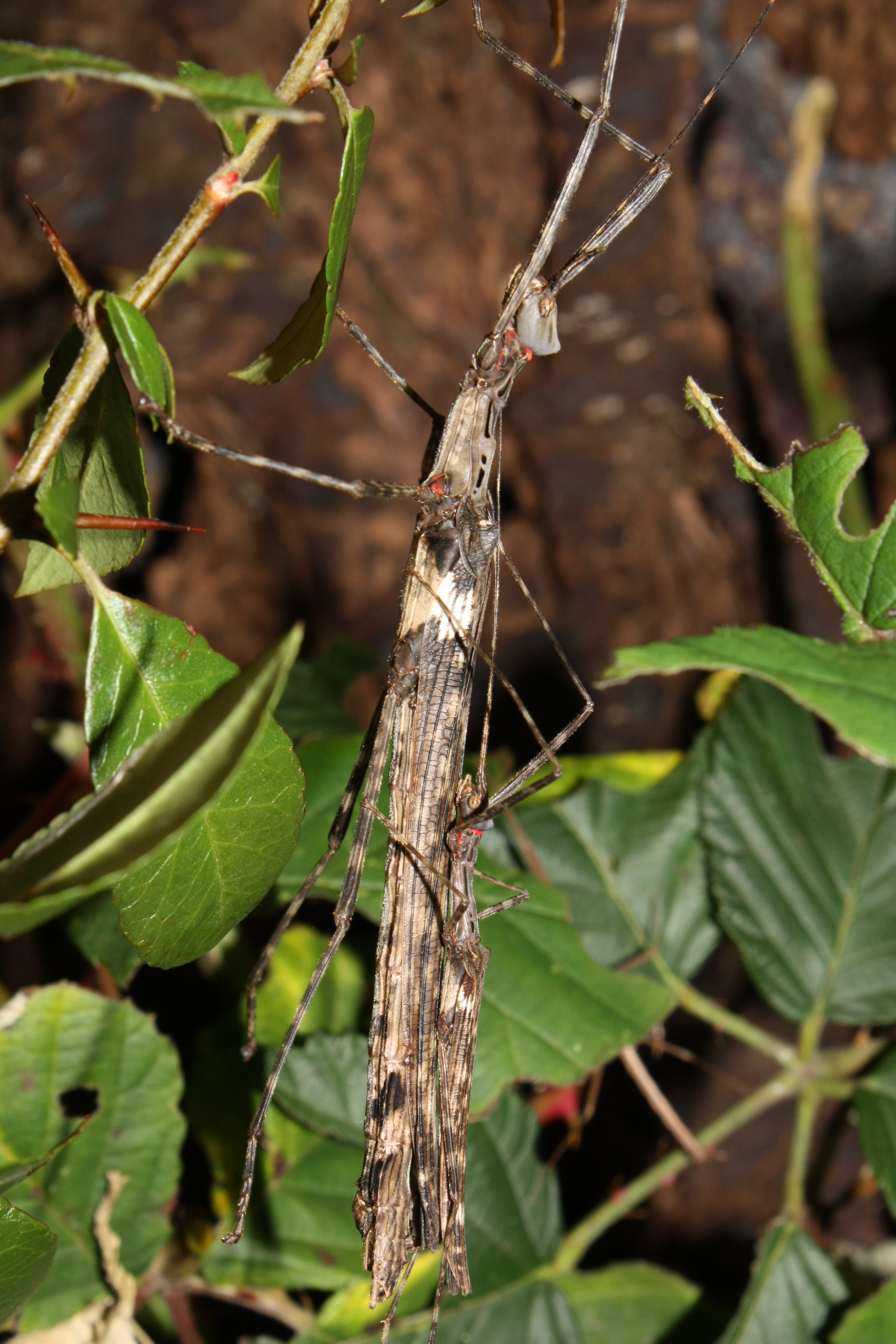
- Trachythorax maculicollis

Scientific classification
- Kingdom: Animalia
- Phylum: Arthropoda
- Class: Insecta
- Order: Phasmatodea
- Family: Lonchodidae
- Subfamily: Necrosciinae
- Tribe: Necrosciini
- Genus: Trachythorax; Redtenbacher, 1908

Type species
- Phasma maculicollis Westwood, 1848

= Trachythorax =

Genus of stick insects

Trachythorax is an Asian genus of stick insects in the family Lonchodidae and subfamily Necrosciinae. Species have been recorded from the Indian subcontinent, Indo-China, Malesia through to New Guinea.

The genus has males much smaller than females. Both sexes are winged and active fliers. The mesonotum is often strongly raised. A brightly coloured membranous ring shows between the pronotum and the head and most species lay eggs in clusters with the eggs having a flower-like collar radiating around them. This architecture might be an adaptation against parasitoid wasps.

== Species ==
Species in the genus include:

- Trachythorax albomaculatus Bresseel & Constant, 2021
- Trachythorax auranticollis Bresseel & Constant, 2021
- Trachythorax chinensis (Redtenbacher, 1908)
- Trachythorax expallescens Redtenbacher, 1908
- Trachythorax fuscocarinatus Chen & He, 1995
- Trachythorax gohi Brock, 1999
- Trachythorax illaesa (Redtenbacher, 1908)
- Trachythorax incertus Redtenbacher, 1908
- Trachythorax longialatus Cai, 1989
- Trachythorax maculicollis (Westwood, 1848) (syn. Trachythorax atrosignata (Brunner von Wattenwyl, 1893))
- Trachythorax planiceps Redtenbacher, 1908
- Trachythorax sexpunctatus (Shiraki, 1911)
- Trachythorax sparaxes (Westwood, 1859)
- Trachythorax unicolor Redtenbacher, 1908
- Trachythorax yunnanensis Gao & Liang, 2021
