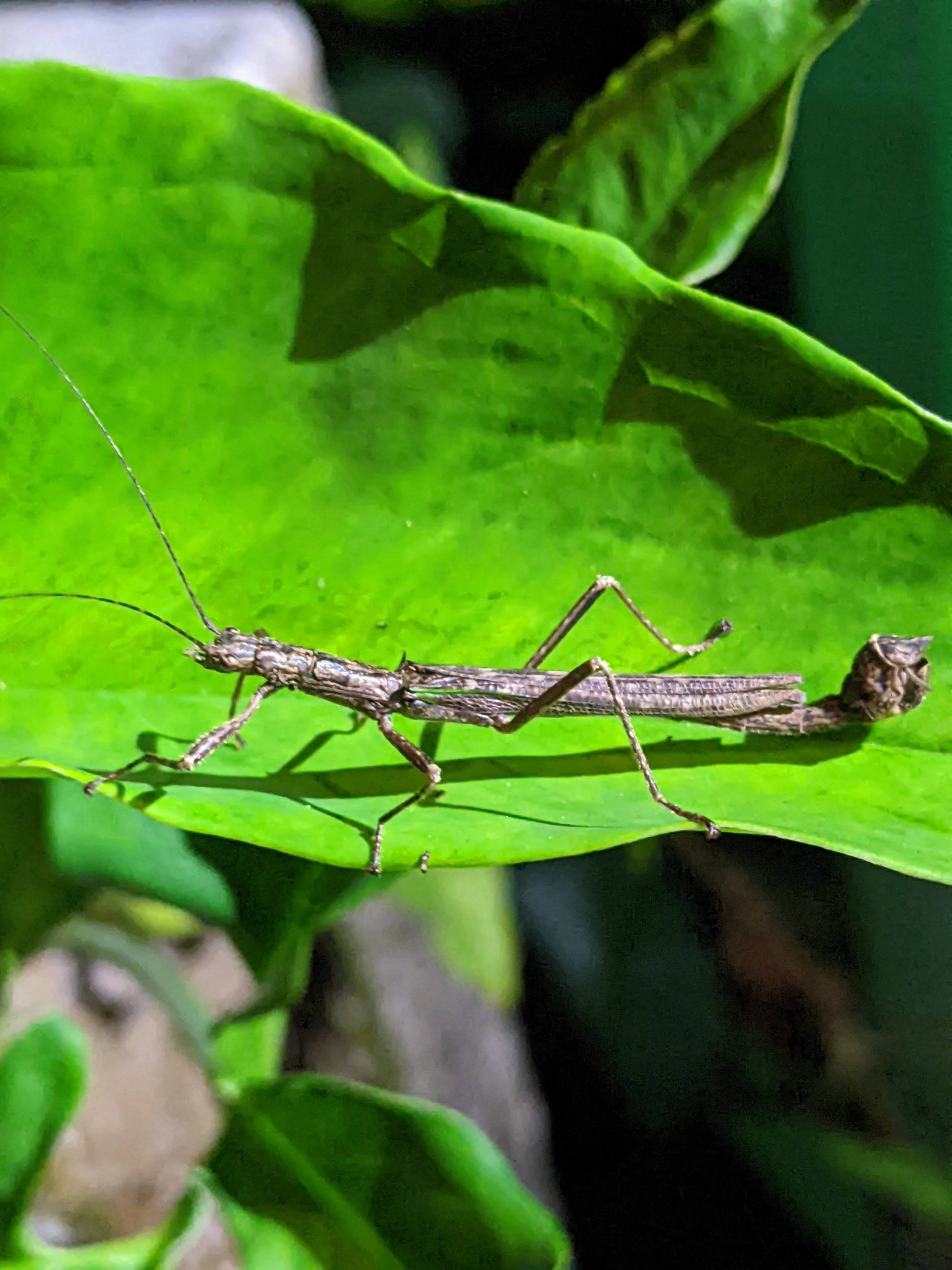
- Presbistus peleus

Scientific classification
- Domain: Eukaryota
- Kingdom: Animalia
- Phylum: Arthropoda
- Class: Insecta
- Order: Phasmatodea
- Family: Aschiphasmatidae
- Subfamily: Aschiphasmatinae
- Tribe: Aschiphasmatini
- Genus: Presbistus; Kirby, 1896

Synonyms
- Presbitus Giglio-Tos, 1910

= Presbistus =

Genus of stick insects

Presbistus is a genus of Asian stick insects in the tribe Aschiphasmatini, erected by William Forsell Kirby in 1896. Species currently have a known distribution in: India, Cambodia, Borneo, Java and Sumatra (but this may be incomplete).

== Species ==
The Phasmida Species File lists:

1. Presbistus appendiculatus Bragg, 2001
2. Presbistus asymmetricus Giglio-Tos, 1910
3. Presbistus crudelis (Westwood, 1859)
4. Presbistus darnis (Westwood, 1859)
5. Presbistus flavicornis (de Haan, 1842)
6. Presbistus infumatus (Charpentier, 1845)
7. Presbistus marshallae Bragg, 2001
8. Presbistus peleus (Gray, 1835) - type species (as Perlamorphus peleus Gray; synonym of Presbistus ridleyi Kirby, 1904)
9. Presbistus viridimarginatus (de Haan, 1842)
10. Presbistus vitivorus Bresseel & Constant, 2022
