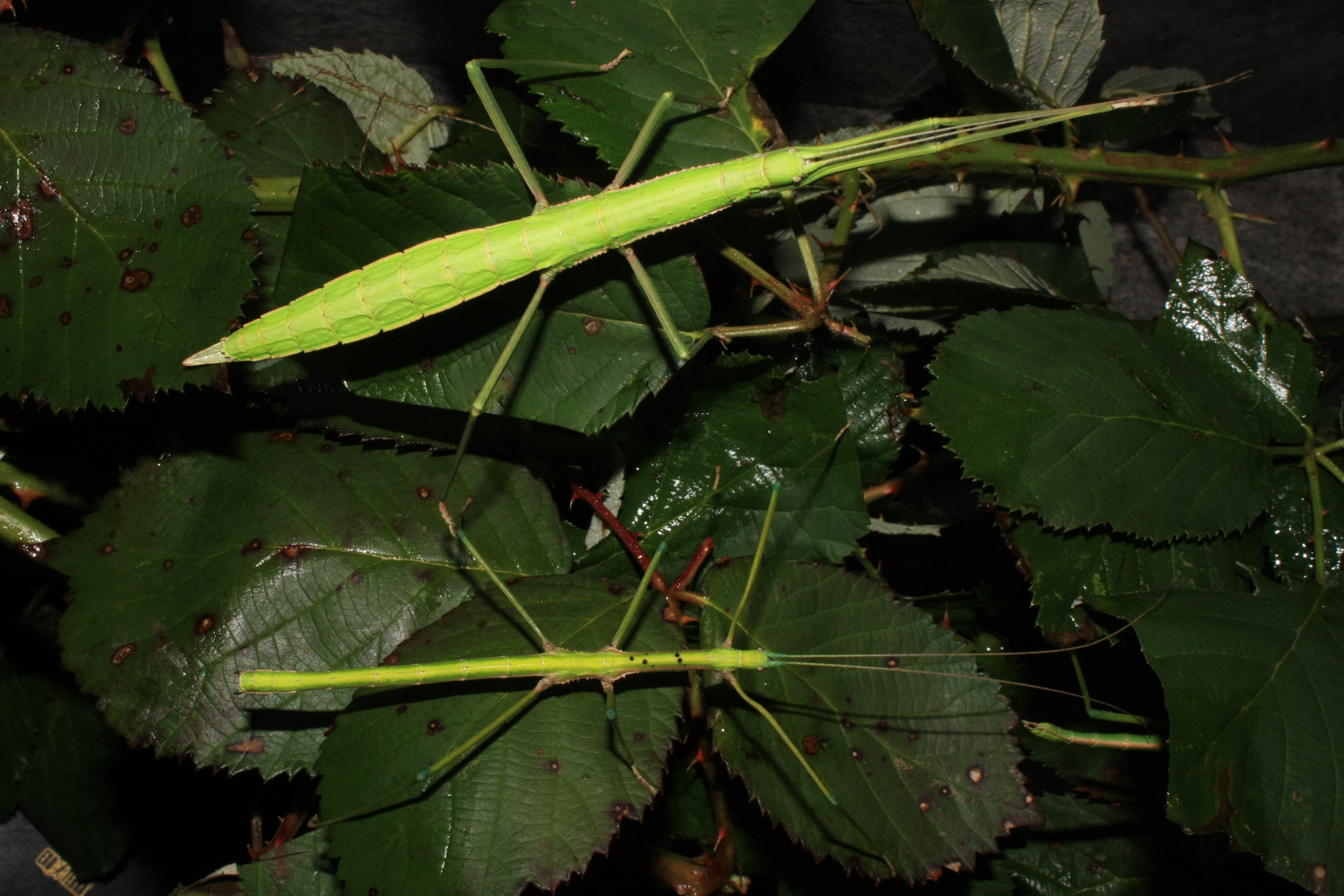
- Paramenexenus laetus: female and male (in culture)

Scientific classification
- Domain: Eukaryota
- Kingdom: Animalia
- Phylum: Arthropoda
- Class: Insecta
- Order: Phasmatodea
- Family: Lonchodidae
- Subfamily: Necrosciinae
- Tribe: Necrosciini
- Genus: Paramenexenus; Redtenbacher, 1908

= Paramenexenus =

Genus of stick insects

Paramenexenus is a genus of Asian stick insects belonging to the family Lonchodidae, erected by Josef Redtenbacher in 1908.

== Species ==
The Phasmida Species File lists:

- Paramenexenus carinulatus Redtenbacher, 1908
- Paramenexenus ceylonicus (Saussure, 1868) - type species (as P. molestus Redtenbacher)
- Paramenexenus congnatus Chen, He & Chen, 2000
- Paramenexenus inconspicuus Redtenbacher, 1908
- Paramenexenus laetus (Kirby, 1904) - the "Vietnam green stick insect"
- Paramenexenus subalienus Redtenbacher, 1908
- Paramenexenus teres Giglio-Tos, 1910
