= Miniphasma =

Scientific classification
- Kingdom: Animalia
- Phylum: Arthropoda
- Class: Insecta
- Order: Phasmatodea
- Family: Phasmatidae
- Subfamily: Pachymorphinae
- Tribe: Pachymorphini
- Genus: Miniphasma; Zompro, 2007

Synonyms
- Microphasma Zompro, 1999

Genus of stick insects

Miniphasma is a genus of phasmid or stick insect of the family Diapheromeridae. Two species are recognized, both endemic to Sri Lanka.

== Species ==
- Miniphasma prima
- Miniphasma secunda
