= Paraprisomera =

Scientific classification
- Domain: Eukaryota
- Kingdom: Animalia
- Phylum: Arthropoda
- Class: Insecta
- Order: Phasmatodea
- Family: Lonchodidae
- Subfamily: Lonchodinae
- Tribe: Lonchodini
- Genus: Paraprisomera; Hennemann, 2002

Genus of insects

Paraprisomera is a genus of phasmids belonging to the family Lonchodidae.

The species of this genus are found in Sri Lanka.

Species:

- Paraprisomera coronata (Brunner von Wattenwyl, 1907)
- Paraprisomera taprobanae (Westwood, 1859)
