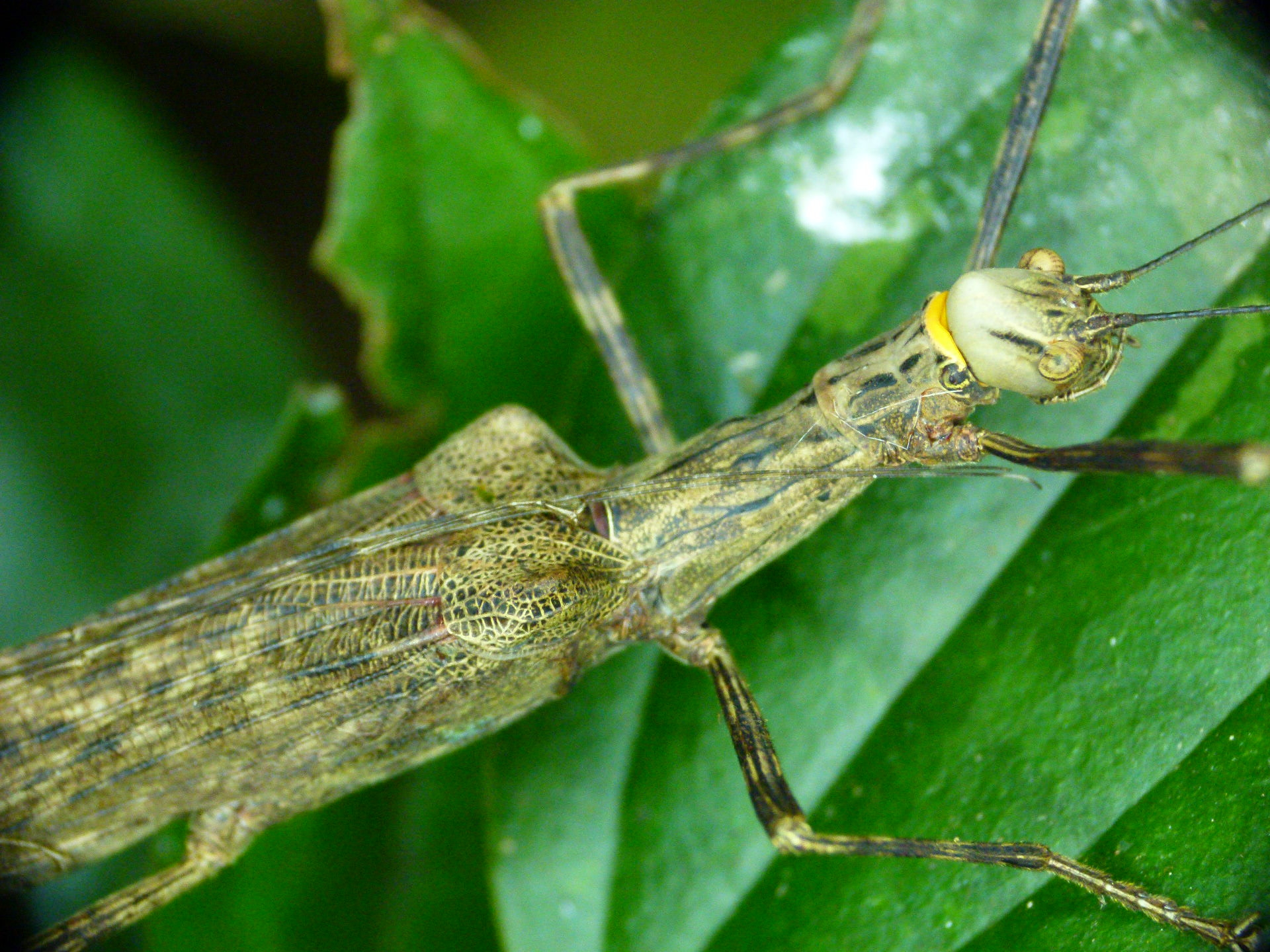
- Head of female, Wayanad

Scientific classification
- Domain: Eukaryota
- Kingdom: Animalia
- Phylum: Arthropoda
- Class: Insecta
- Order: Phasmatodea
- Family: Lonchodidae
- Genus: Trachythorax
- Species: T. illaesa

Binomial name
- Trachythorax illaesa (Redtenbacher, 1908)

Synonyms
- Necroscia illaesa

= Trachythorax illaesa =

Species of stick-insect

Trachythorax illaesa is a species of stick-insect from in the Western Ghats of India and in Sri Lanka. Males are much smaller than females and they are both winged and capable of strong flight. They lay eggs in clusters with ornate architecture and a flower-like radiating collar that is thought to provide protection from parasitoid wasps.

It was described by Redtenbacher on the basis of single male specimen but synonymized in 2005 under T. maculicollis. It was restored as a valid species in 2021. The yellow membrane between the head and the pronotum and the black markings on the mesonotum are characteristic. Like all members of Trachythorax, they have males that are almost half the length of the females. They lay eggs in clusters which are glued onto the substrate, often a twig.They have an opercular collar which expands upon drying and forms a skirt around the egg. The toothed lateral margins are thought to provide defense against parasitoid wasps by reducing the area of the eggs that are available for the wasp to reach to lay eggs on or inside.
