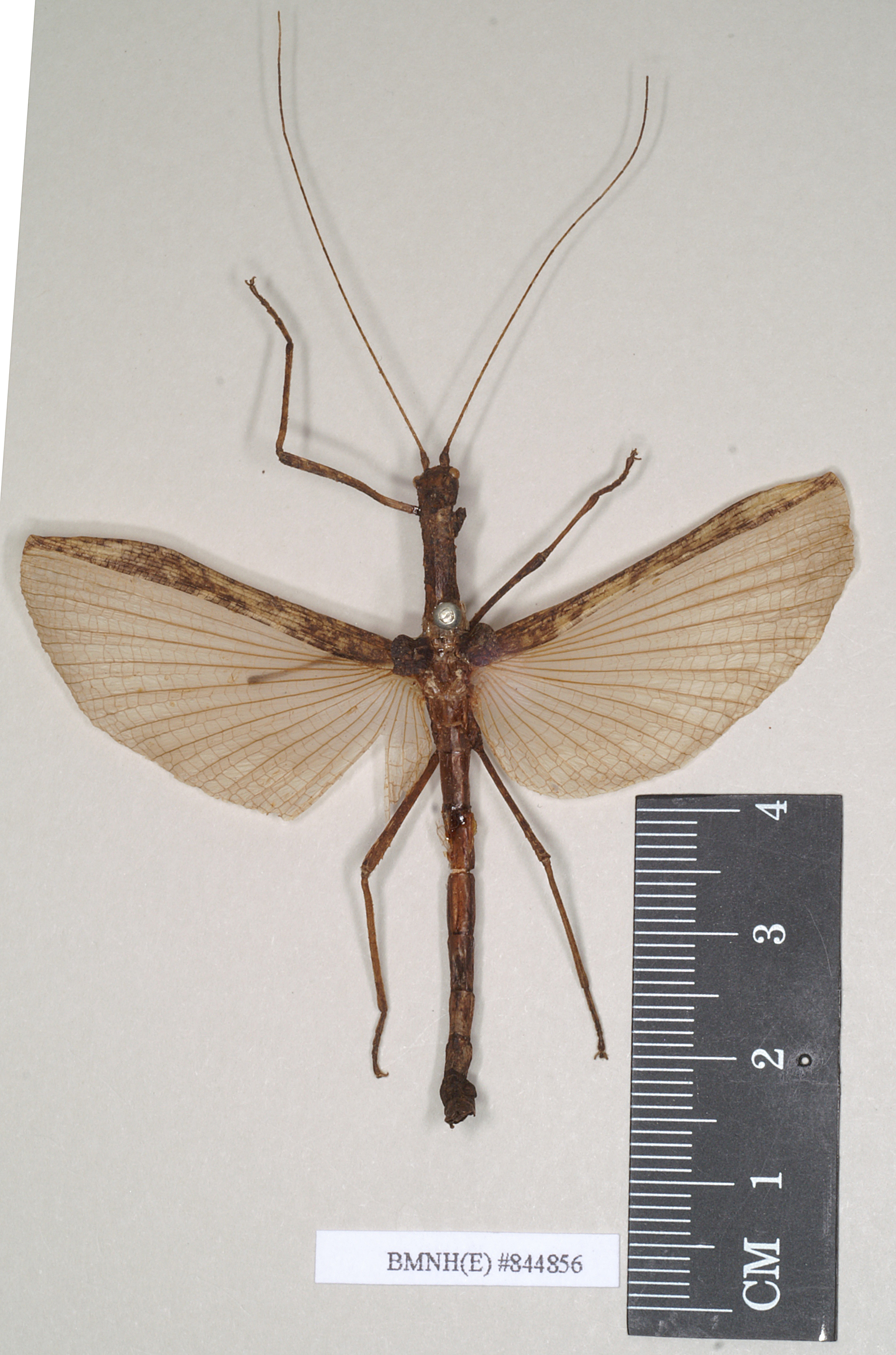
- Sosibia passalus

Scientific classification
- Kingdom: Animalia
- Phylum: Arthropoda
- Clade: Pancrustacea
- Class: Insecta
- Order: Phasmatodea
- Family: Lonchodidae
- Subfamily: Necrosciinae
- Tribe: Necrosciini
- Genus: Sosibia; Stål, 1875

= Sosibia =

Genus of stick insects

Sosibia is an Asian genus of stick insects in the family Lonchodidae and subfamily Necrosciinae.

== Species ==
The Phasmida Species File lists:

1. Sosibia aeneicollis (Redtenbacher, 1908)
2. Sosibia aurita (Fabricius, 1793)
3. Sosibia curtipes (Westwood, 1848)
4. Sosibia euryalus (Westwood, 1859)
5. Sosibia flavomarginata Chen & He, 2008
6. Sosibia gibba Li & Bu, 2022
7. Sosibia guangdongensis Chen & Chen, 2000
8. Sosibia medogensis Chen & He, 2004
9. Sosibia nigrispina Stål, 1875 - type species
10. Sosibia ovata Li & Bu, 2022
11. Sosibia passalus (Westwood, 1859)
12. Sosibia peninsularis Kirby, 1904
13. Sosibia pholidotus (Westwood, 1859)
14. Sosibia quadrispinosa Redtenbacher, 1908
15. Sosibia spinoaurita Seow-Choen, 2021
