= Abrosoma virescens =

Scientific classification
- Kingdom: Animalia
- Phylum: Arthropoda
- Clade: Pancrustacea
- Class: Insecta
- Order: Phasmatodea
- Family: Aschiphasmatidae
- Genus: Abrosoma
- Species: A. virescens

Binomial name
- Abrosoma virescens Redtenbacher, 1906

Species of insect

Abrosoma virescens is a species of phasmid or stick insect of the genus Abrosoma. It is found in Sri Lanka.
