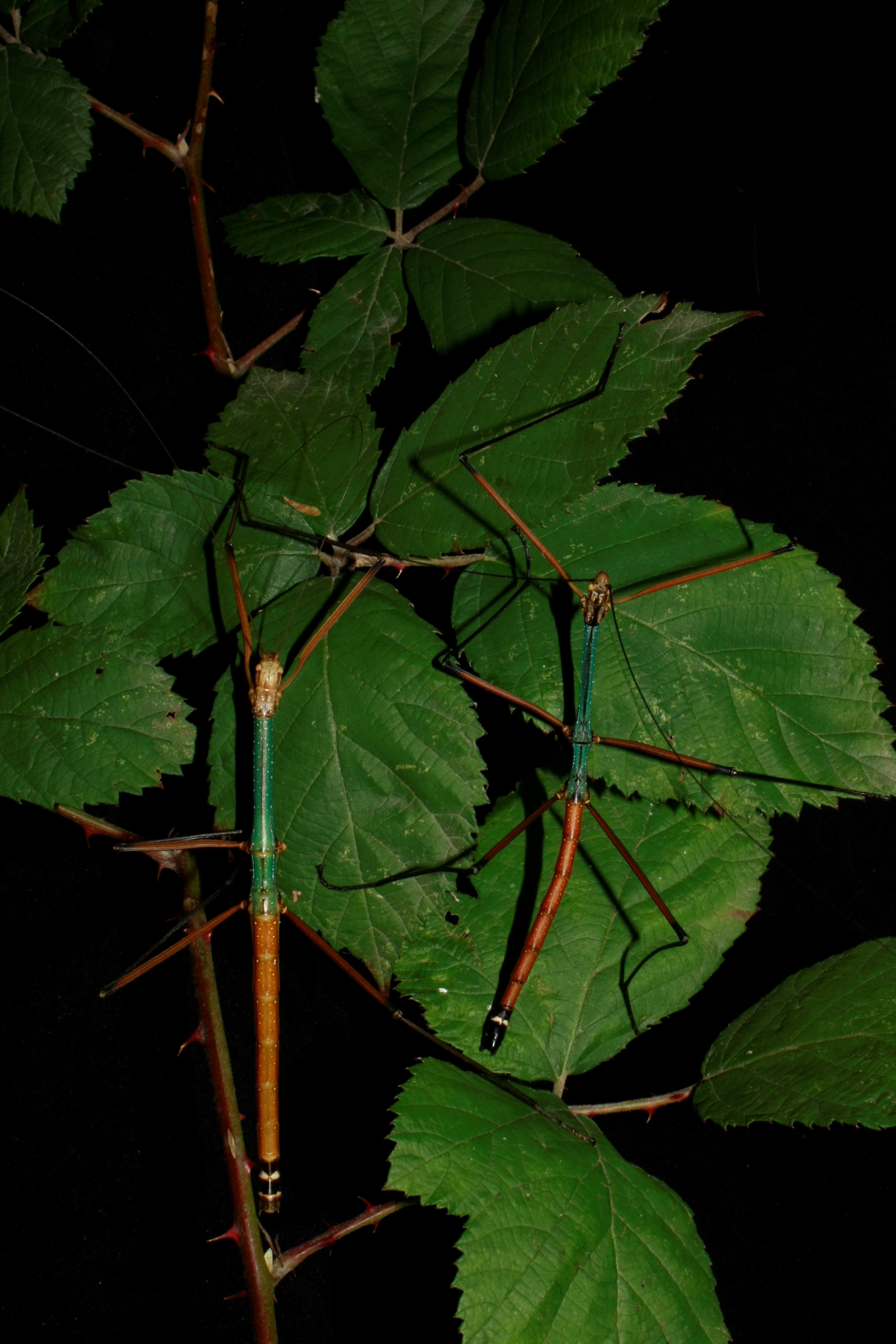
- Lopaphus sp. from Cúc Phương National Park

Scientific classification
- Kingdom: Animalia
- Phylum: Arthropoda
- Clade: Pancrustacea
- Class: Insecta
- Order: Phasmatodea
- Family: Lonchodidae
- Tribe: Necrosciini
- Genus: Lopaphus; Westwood, 1859

Synonyms
- Arthminotus Bi, 1995; Candaules Stål, 1875; Cercophylla Redtenbacher, 1908; Paramyronides Redtenbacher, 1908

= Lopaphus =

Genus of stick insects

Lopaphus is an Asian genus of stick insects in the tribe Necrosciini. Species have been recorded from India, China and South-East Asia.

== Species ==
The Catalogue of Life and Phasmida Species File list:

- Lopaphus albopunctatus (Chen & He, 2004)
- Lopaphus angusticauda (Chen & Xu, 2008)
- Lopaphus atalantia (Thanasinchayakul, 2006)
- Lopaphus bootanicus (Westwood, 1859)
- Lopaphus borneensis Bragg, 1995
- Lopaphus bougainvillea (Thanasinchayakul, 2006)
- Lopaphus brachypterus (Haan, 1842) – type species (as Phasma brachypterum Haan, W. de, locality: Sumatra)
- Lopaphus buegersi Günther, 1929
- Lopaphus crishna (Westwood, 1859)
- Lopaphus iolas (Westwood, 1859)
- Lopaphus muticus (Redtenbacher, 1908)
- Lopaphus nanoalatus Brock, 1999
- Lopaphus pedestris (Redtenbacher, 1908)
- Lopaphus perakensis (Redtenbacher, 1908)
- Lopaphus porus (Westwood, 1859)
- Lopaphus psidium (Thanasinchayakul, 2006)
- Lopaphus shenglii Ho, 2013
- Lopaphus sinensis (Bi, 1995)
- Lopaphus sphalerus (Redtenbacher, 1908)
- Lopaphus srilankensis Hennemann, 2002
- Lopaphus suwinae Seow-Choen, 2000
- Lopaphus tonkinensis (Redtenbacher, 1908)
- Lopaphus transiens (Redtenbacher, 1908)
- Lopaphus trilineatus (Carl, 1913)
- Lopaphus unidentatus (Chen & He, 1995)
- Lopaphus yunnanensis (Chen & He, 1995)
- Lopaphus zayuensis (Chen & He, 2008)
