= Parasipyloidea =

Scientific classification
- Domain: Eukaryota
- Kingdom: Animalia
- Phylum: Arthropoda
- Class: Insecta
- Order: Phasmatodea
- Family: Lonchodidae
- Subfamily: Necrosciinae
- Tribe: Necrosciini
- Genus: Parasipyloidea; Redtenbacher, 1908

Type species
- Parasipyloidea aenea Redtenbacher, 1908

Genus of insects

Parasipyloidea is a genus of phasmids belonging to the family Lonchodidae.

== Species ==
The Phasmida Species File list:

- Parasipyloidea aenea Redtenbacher, 1908
- Parasipyloidea carinata Ho, 2013
- Parasipyloidea emeiensis Chen & He, 1994
- Parasipyloidea exigua Günther, 1934
- Parasipyloidea ficta (Redtenbacher, 1908)
- Parasipyloidea galbina Ho, 2013
- Parasipyloidea jinggangshanensis Ho, 2015
- Parasipyloidea minuta Redtenbacher, 1908
- Parasipyloidea montana Redtenbacher, 1908
- Parasipyloidea nigrimarginata Ho, 2017
- Parasipyloidea novaeguineae Redtenbacher, 1908
- Parasipyloidea rugulosa Chen & He, 2008
- Parasipyloidea seiferti Hennemann, 2002
- Parasipyloidea shiva (Westwood, 1859)
- Parasipyloidea sinensis Ho, 2013
- Parasipyloidea zehntneri Redtenbacher, 1908
