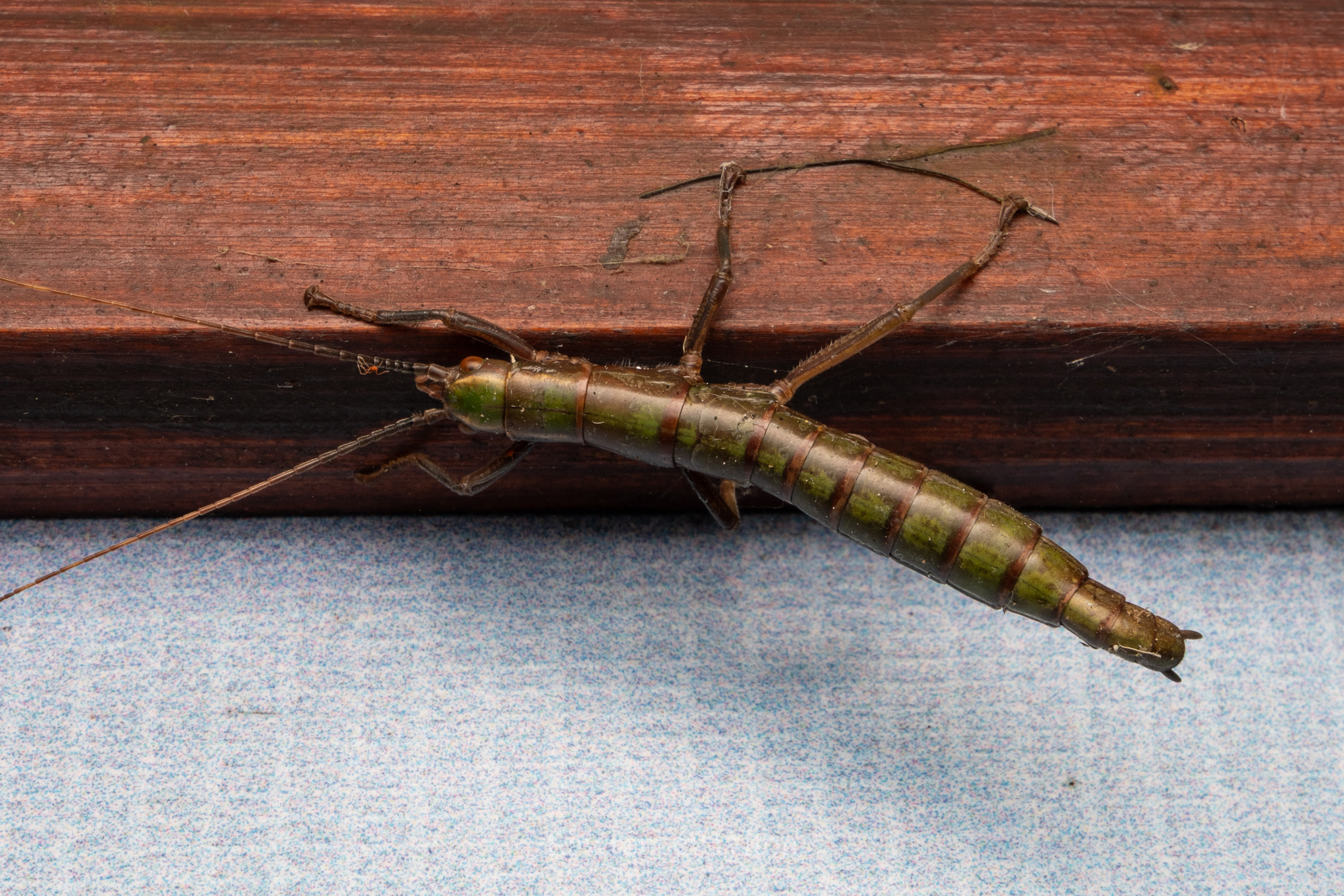
- Dajaca chani

Scientific classification
- Domain: Eukaryota
- Kingdom: Animalia
- Phylum: Arthropoda
- Class: Insecta
- Order: Phasmatodea
- Superfamily: Aschiphasmatoidea
- Family: Aschiphasmatidae
- Subfamily: Aschiphasmatinae
- Genus: Dajaca; Brunner von Wattenwyl, 1893

Synonyms
- Nanhuaphasma Chen, He & Li, 2002; Phaeophasma Redtenbacher, 1906

= Dajaca =

Genus of stick insects

External image
- Images at iNaturalist

Dajaca is a genus of stick insects belonging to the suborder Verophasmatodea, family Aschiphasmatidae and is the only representative of the monotypic tribe Dajacini. Species have been recorded from Borneo, Vietnam, Hong Kong and Myanmar.

== Species ==
The Phasmida Species File list the following:

1. Dajaca alata (Redtenbacher, 1906)
2. Dajaca chani Seow-Choen, 1998
3. Dajaca filiformis Bragg, 1992
4. Dajaca monilicornis Redtenbacher, 1906 - type species locality Borneo (see specimen)
5. Dajaca napolovi Brock, 2000
6. Dajaca nigrolineata Hennemann, Conle & Bruckner, 1996
7. Dajaca swiae Seow-Choen, 2020
8. Dajaca viridipennis Bragg, 2001
