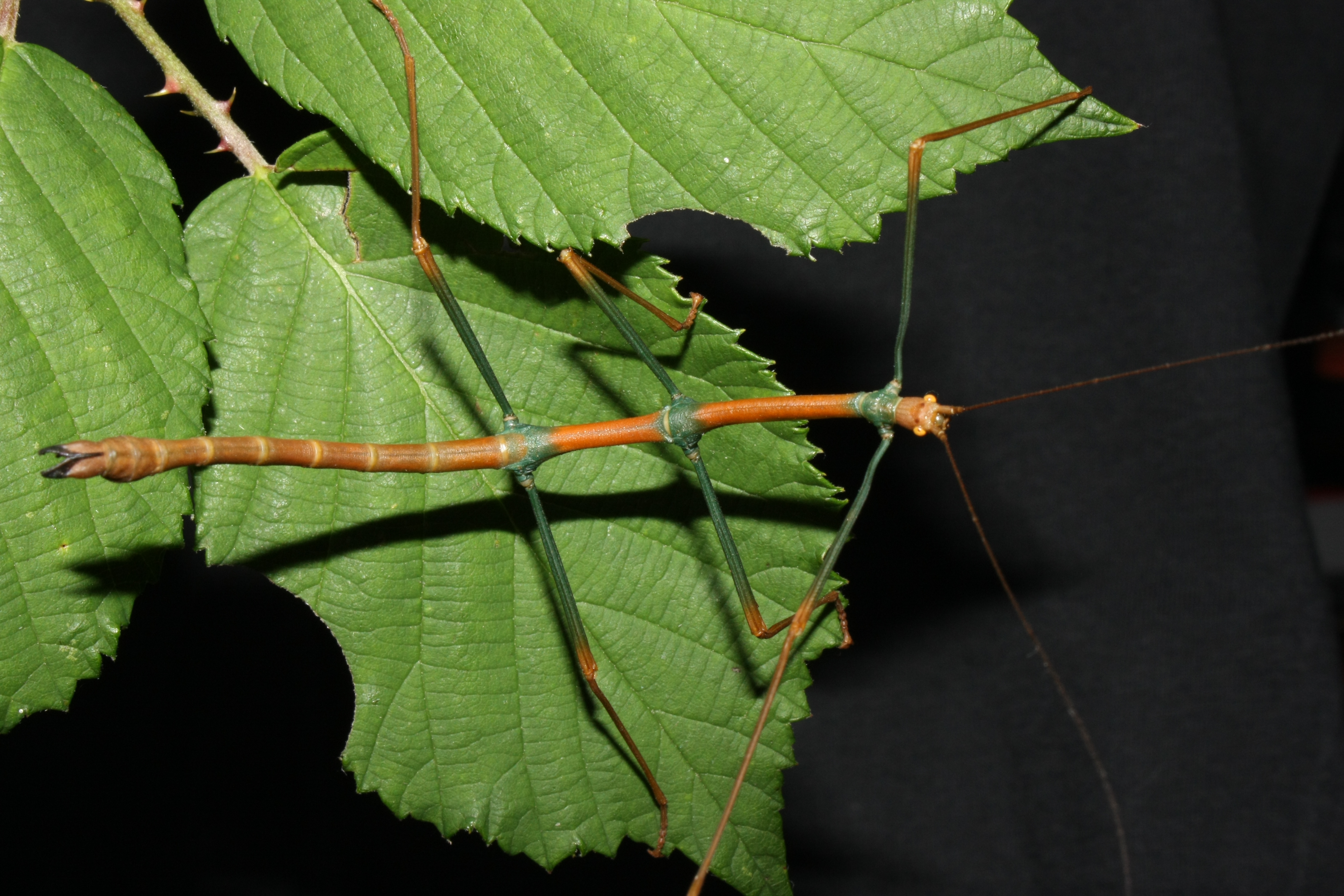
- Lonchodes philippinicus male

Scientific classification
- Domain: Eukaryota
- Kingdom: Animalia
- Phylum: Arthropoda
- Class: Insecta
- Order: Phasmatodea
- Family: Lonchodidae
- Subfamily: Lonchodinae
- Tribe: Lonchodini
- Genus: Lonchodes; Gray, 1835

Synonyms
- Phasgania Kirby, 1896

= Lonchodes =

Genus of stick insects

Lonchodes is a genus of stick insects in the family Phasmatidae and the type genus of the family Lonchodidae and tribe Lonchodini. Species have a known distribution that includes tropical Asia and the Pacific.

== Species ==
The Phasmida Species File lists:

1. Lonchodes abbreviatus (Brunner von Wattenwyl, 1907)
2. Lonchodes auriculatus (Brunner von Wattenwyl, 1907)
3. Lonchodes beecheyi (Gray, 1835)
4. Lonchodes bobaiensis (Chen, 1986)
5. Lonchodes brevipes Gray, 1835 - type species
6. Lonchodes bryanti Caudell, 1927
7. Lonchodes chani (Hausleithner, 1991)
8. Lonchodes dalawangsungay Zompro, 2003
9. Lonchodes decolyanus Brunner von Wattenwyl, 1907
10. Lonchodes denticauda Bates, 1865
11. Lonchodes elegans Brunner von Wattenwyl, 1907
12. Lonchodes everetti (Kirby, 1896)
13. Lonchodes femoralis Brunner von Wattenwyl, 1907
14. Lonchodes flavicornis Bates, 1865
15. Lonchodes fruhstorferi Brunner von Wattenwyl, 1907
16. Lonchodes godama Wood-Mason, 1877
17. Lonchodes gracicercatus (Chen & He, 2008)
18. Lonchodes gracillimus (Kirby, 1904)
19. Lonchodes guangdongensis (Chen & He, 2008)
20. Lonchodes hainanensis (Chen & He, 2002)
21. Lonchodes histrio (Brunner von Wattenwyl, 1907)
22. Lonchodes huapingensis (Bi & Li, 1991)
23. Lonchodes imitans Brunner von Wattenwyl, 1907
24. Lonchodes incertus (Brunner von Wattenwyl, 1907)
25. Lonchodes jejunus (Brunner von Wattenwyl, 1907)
26. Lonchodes longipes Brunner von Wattenwyl, 1907
27. Lonchodes margaritatus (Brunner von Wattenwyl, 1907)
28. Lonchodes mirabilis (Brunner von Wattenwyl, 1907)
29. Lonchodes modestus (Brunner von Wattenwyl, 1907)
30. Lonchodes myrina Westwood, 1859
31. Lonchodes nigriantennatus (Chen & He, 2002)
32. Lonchodes normalis Brunner von Wattenwyl, 1907
33. Lonchodes obstrictus Brunner von Wattenwyl, 1907
34. Lonchodes parvus (Chen & He, 1994)
35. Lonchodes paucigranulatus (Chen & Xu, 2008)
36. Lonchodes philippinicus Hennemann & Conle, 2007
37. Lonchodes praon Westwood, 1859
38. Lonchodes reductus Brunner von Wattenwyl, 1907
39. Lonchodes sanguineoligatus (Brunner von Wattenwyl, 1907)
40. Lonchodes skapanus Brock, 1999
41. Lonchodes sospes Brunner von Wattenwyl, 1907
42. Lonchodes spectatus Brunner von Wattenwyl, 1907
43. Lonchodes spurcus (Brunner von Wattenwyl, 1907)
44. Lonchodes supernumerarius Brunner von Wattenwyl, 1907
45. Lonchodes tonkinensis Brunner von Wattenwyl, 1907
46. Lonchodes verrucifer Wood-Mason, 1876
47. Lonchodes viridis Kirby, 1904

== See also ==
- Omiodes: Lonchodes is a synonym.
