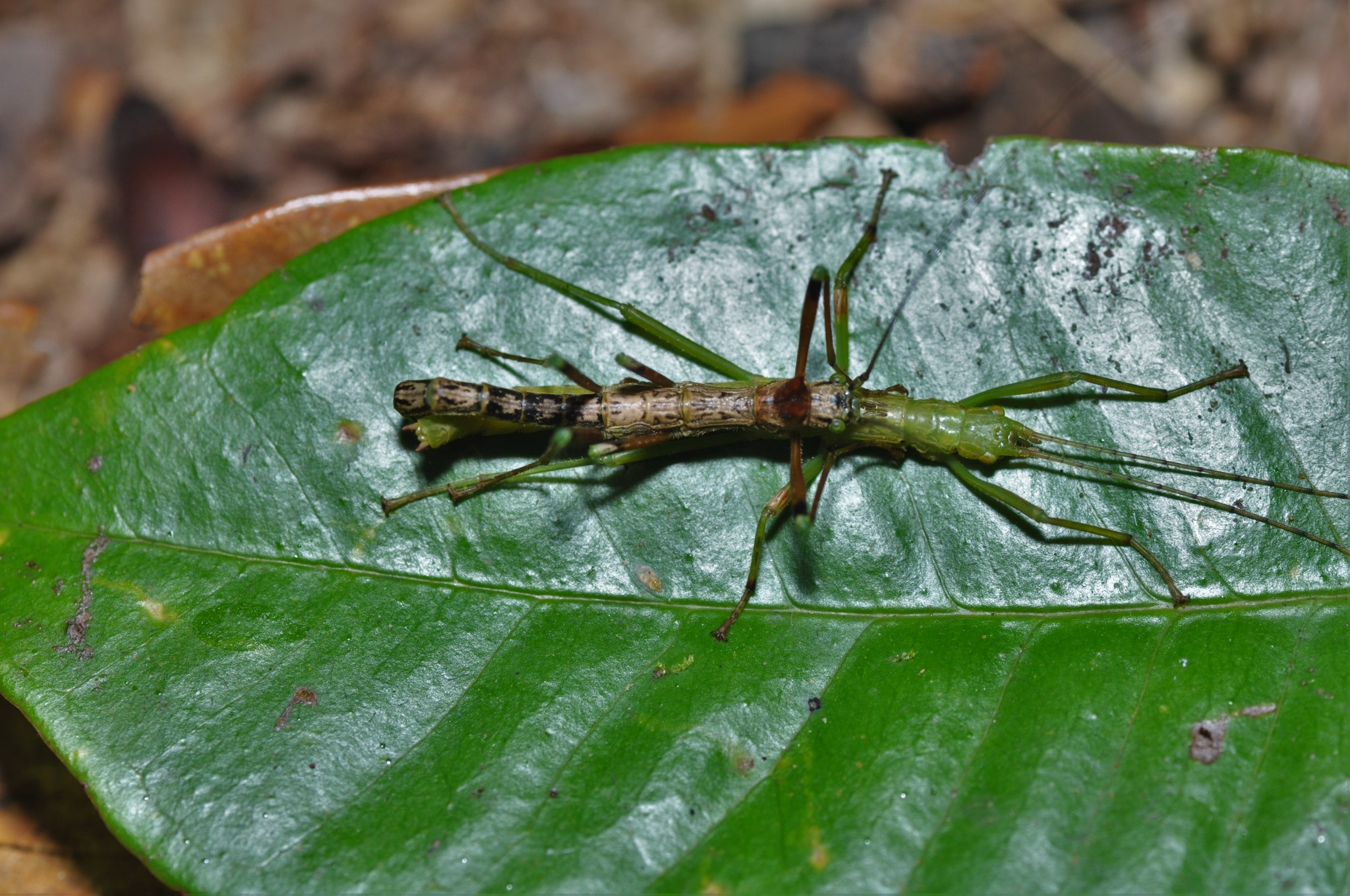
- Parabrosoma bispinosum from Sumatra

Scientific classification
- Kingdom: Animalia
- Phylum: Arthropoda
- Clade: Pancrustacea
- Class: Insecta
- Order: Phasmatodea
- Family: Aschiphasmatidae
- Subfamily: Aschiphasmatinae
- Tribe: Aschiphasmatini
- Genus: Parabrosoma; Giglio-Tos, 1910

Species
- Parabrosoma bispinosum Parabrosoma brevifemurum

= Parabrosoma =

Genus of stick insects

Parabrosoma is a genus of stick insects (Phasmatids) that belongs to the family Aschiphasmatidae. This genus can be found occurring on the island of Sumatra in Indonesia.

== Taxonomy ==
The genus was described in 1910 by Ermanno Giglio-Tos, an Italian entomologist.

=== Species ===
This genus currently contains two species. They are listed below:

- Parabrosoma bispinosum (Dohrn, 1910)
- Parabrosoma brevifemurum Seow-Choen, 2018
