= Ramulus ceylonense =

Scientific classification
- Kingdom: Animalia
- Phylum: Arthropoda
- Class: Insecta
- Order: Phasmatodea
- Family: Phasmatidae
- Genus: Ramulus
- Species: R. ceylonense

Binomial name
- Ramulus ceylonense Otte & Brock, 2005

Synonyms
- Baculum laevigatum (Brunner von Wattenwyl, 1907); Clitumnus laevigatus Brunner von Wattenwyl, 1907; Ramulus laevigatus (Brunner von Wattenwyl, 1907)

Species of stick insect

Ramulus ceylonense is a species of phasmid or stick insect. It is found in Sri Lanka.
