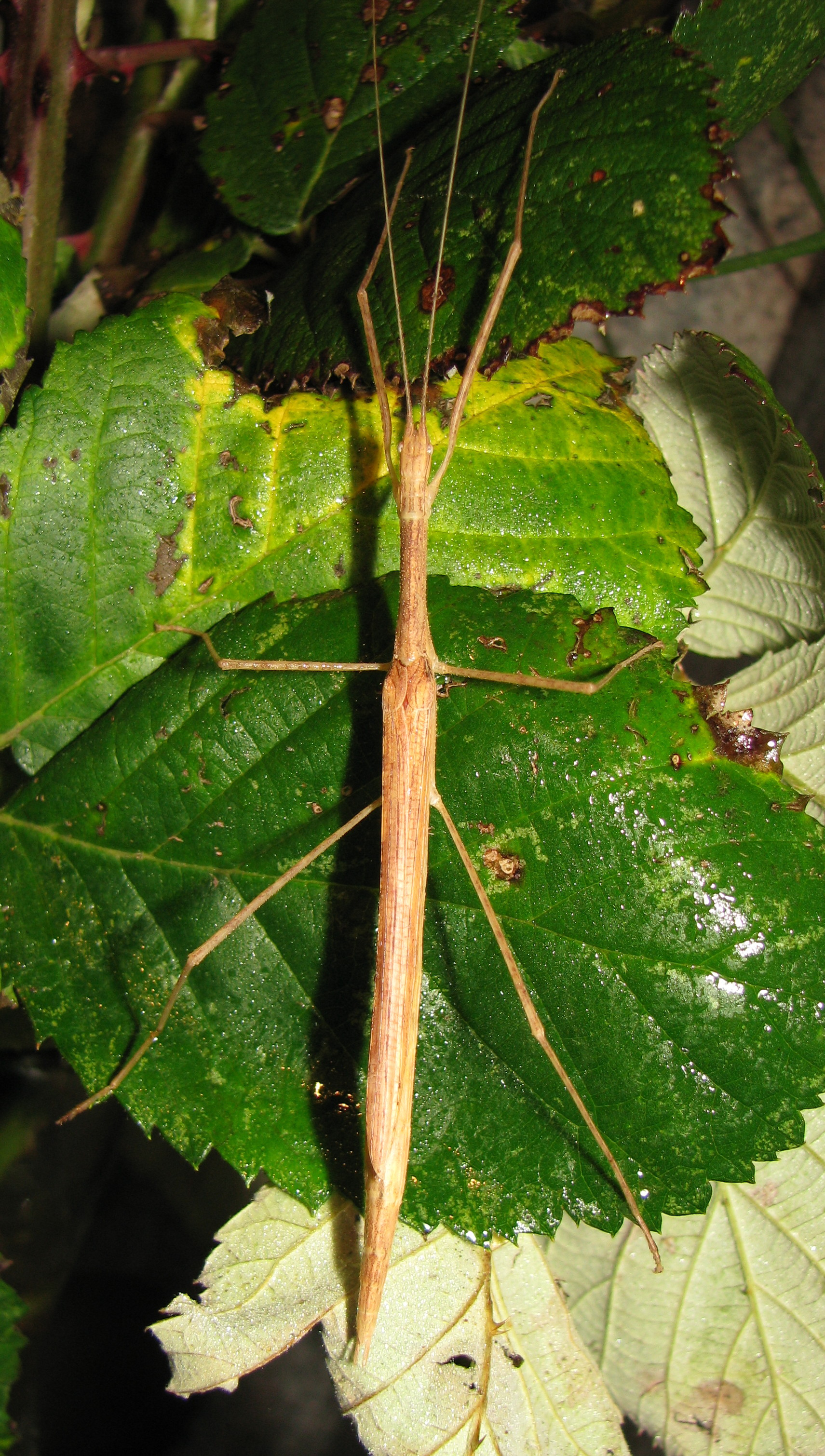
- Sipyloidea sipylus

Scientific classification
- Kingdom: Animalia
- Phylum: Arthropoda
- Clade: Pancrustacea
- Class: Insecta
- Order: Phasmatodea
- Family: Lonchodidae
- Subfamily: Necrosciinae
- Tribe: Necrosciini
- Genus: Sipyloidea; Brunner von Wattenwyl, 1893

= Sipyloidea =

Genus of stick insects

Sipyloidea is a genus of stick insects of the family Lonchodidae. Species have been recorded from India, China, Indochina, through to Australasia. The genus was described by Brunner von Wattenwyl in 1893.

== Species ==
The Phasmida Species File lists:

1. Sipyloidea abnormis Redtenbacher, 1908
2. Sipyloidea acanthonotus Günther, 1938
3. Sipyloidea acutipennis (Bates, 1865)
4. Sipyloidea adelpha Günther, 1940
5. Sipyloidea albogeniculata Redtenbacher, 1908
6. Sipyloidea atricoxis (Westwood, 1859)
7. Sipyloidea bella (Tepper, 1905)
8. Sipyloidea biplagiata Redtenbacher, 1908
9. Sipyloidea bistriolata Redtenbacher, 1908
10. Sipyloidea brevialata Redtenbacher, 1908
11. Sipyloidea brevicerca Chen & He, 2008
12. Sipyloidea brevicerci Hasenpusch & Brock, 2007
13. Sipyloidea caeca (Sjöstedt, 1918)
14. Sipyloidea cavata Chen & He, 1993
15. Sipyloidea ceramia (Westwood, 1859)
16. Sipyloidea ceylonica (Saussure, 1868)
17. Sipyloidea completa Chen & He, 1993
18. Sipyloidea doleschali Redtenbacher, 1908
19. Sipyloidea eurynome (Stål, 1877)
20. Sipyloidea excellens Günther, 1929
21. Sipyloidea foenosa Redtenbacher, 1908
22. Sipyloidea fontanesina Giglio-Tos, 1910
23. Sipyloidea garradungensis Hasenpusch & Brock, 2007
24. Sipyloidea gracilipes (Sjöstedt, 1918)
25. Sipyloidea gularis (de Haan, 1842)
26. Sipyloidea inscia Redtenbacher, 1908
27. Sipyloidea larryi Hasenpusch & Brock, 2007
28. Sipyloidea lewisensis Hasenpusch & Brock, 2007
29. Sipyloidea nelida John, Rentz & Contreras, 1987
30. Sipyloidea nitida Günther, 1938
31. Sipyloidea okunii Shiraki, 1935
32. Sipyloidea panaetius (Westwood, 1859)
33. Sipyloidea rentzi Brock & Hasenpusch, 2007
34. Sipyloidea reticulata Günther, 1930
35. Sipyloidea robusta Günther, 1936
36. Sipyloidea samsoo (Westwood, 1859)
37. Sipyloidea shukmunae Seow-Choen, 2018
38. Sipyloidea similis Rentz & John, 1987
39. Sipyloidea sipylus (Westwood, 1859) - type species (as Necroscia sipylus Westwood)
40. Sipyloidea stigmata Redtenbacher, 1908
41. Sipyloidea supervacanea Redtenbacher, 1908
42. Sipyloidea tuberculata Ho, 2017
43. Sipyloidea warasaca (Westwood, 1859)
44. Sipyloidea whitei Brock & Hasenpusch, 2007
45. Sipyloidea wuzhishanensis (Chen & He, 2002)
