= Prisomera =

Scientific classification
- Domain: Eukaryota
- Kingdom: Animalia
- Phylum: Arthropoda
- Class: Insecta
- Order: Phasmatodea
- Family: Lonchodidae
- Subfamily: Lonchodinae
- Tribe: Lonchodini
- Genus: Prisomera; Gray, 1835

Genus of insects

Prisomera is a genus of phasmids belonging to the family Lonchodidae.

Species:

- Prisomera asperum (Brunner von Wattenwyl, 1907)
- Prisomera auscultator (Bates, 1865)
- Prisomera canna (Haan, 1842)
- Prisomera cyllabacum (Westwood, 1859)
- Prisomera ignava (Brunner von Wattenwyl, 1907)
- Prisomera mimas (Westwood, 1859)
- Prisomera nodosum Günther, 1938
- Prisomera obsolefactum Günther, 1935
- Prisomera spinicollis Gray, 1835
- Prisomera spinosissimum (Brunner von Wattenwyl, 1907)
