= Abrosoma nebulosum =

Scientific classification
- Kingdom: Animalia
- Phylum: Arthropoda
- Class: Insecta
- Order: Phasmatodea
- Family: Aschiphasmatidae
- Genus: Abrosoma
- Species: A. nebulosum

Binomial name
- Abrosoma nebulosum (Westwood, 1859)

Synonyms
- Aschipasma nebulosum Westwood, 1859; Presbistus nebulosus (Westwood, 1859)

Species of stick insect

Abrosoma nebulosum is a species of phasmid or stick insect of the genus Abrosoma. It is found in Sri Lanka.
