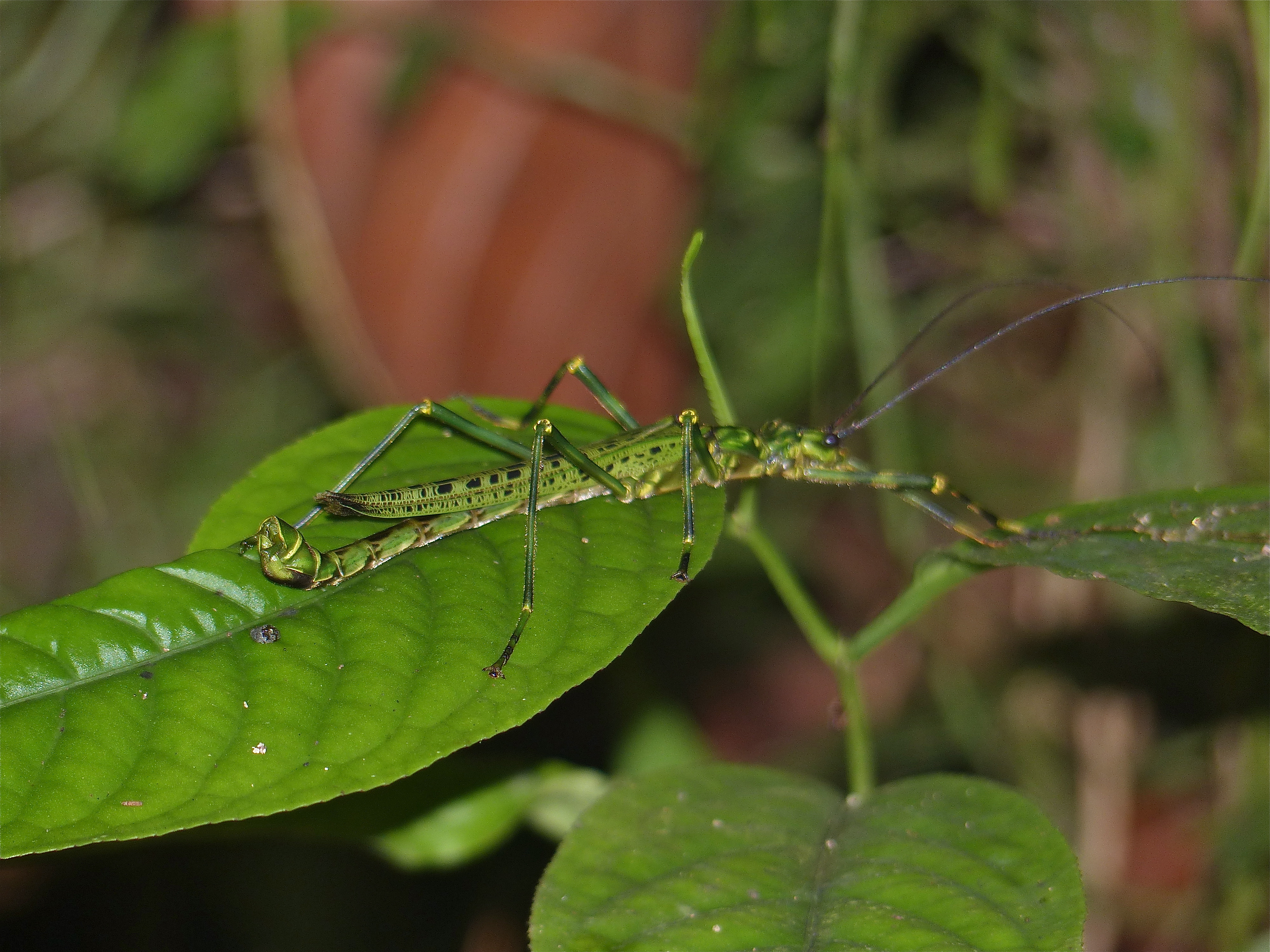
- Aschiphasma annulipes from Sarawak
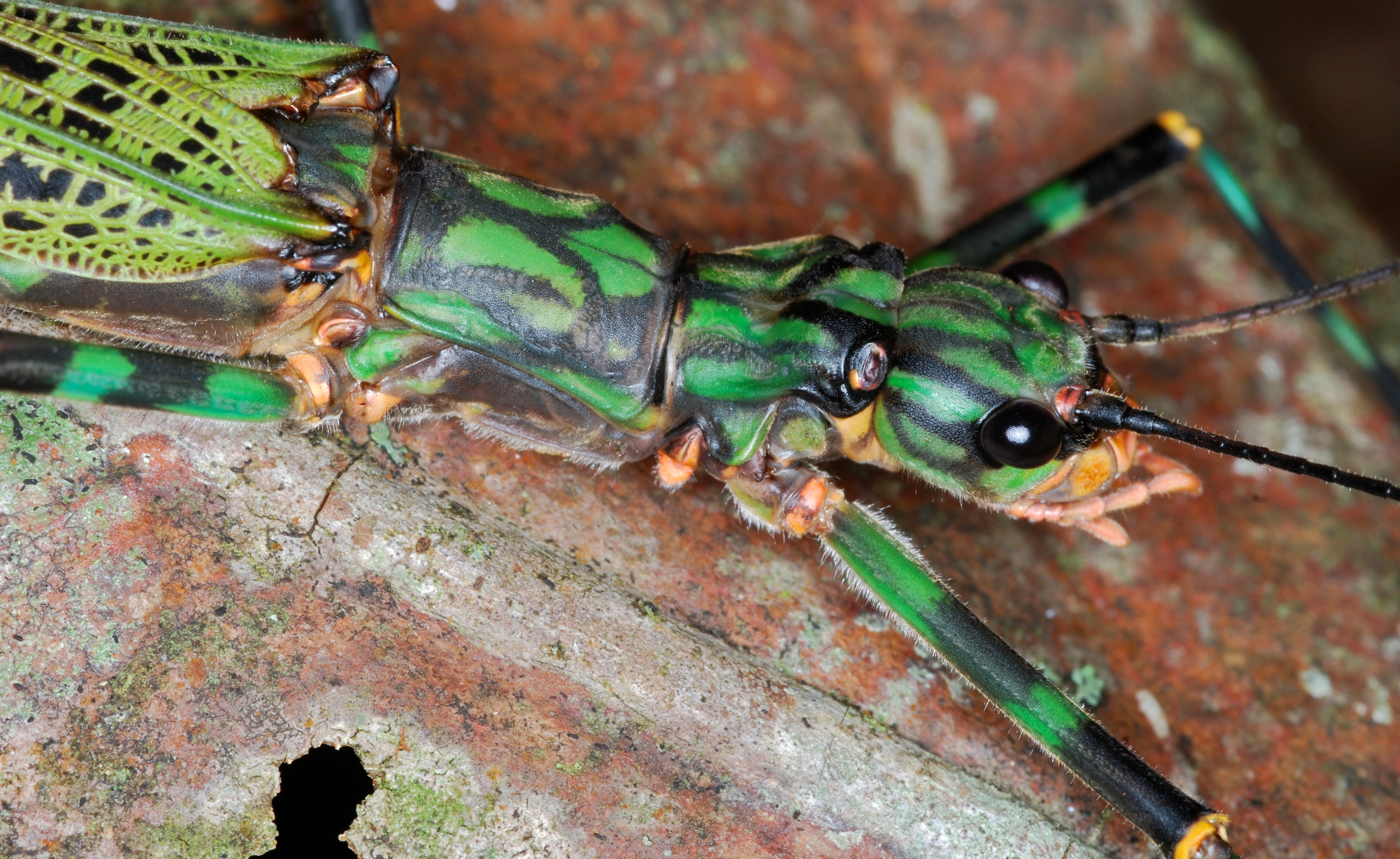
- A. annulipes from Perak

Scientific classification
- Kingdom: Animalia
- Phylum: Arthropoda
- Clade: Pancrustacea
- Class: Insecta
- Order: Phasmatodea
- Family: Aschiphasmatidae
- Subfamily: Aschiphasmatinae
- Tribe: Aschiphasmatini
- Genus: Aschiphasma; Westwood, 1834

Synonyms
- Ascephasma Haan, 1842; Aschipasma Westwood, 1859; Perlamorpha Audinet-Serville, 1838; Perlamorphus Gray, 1835; Ascepasma Burmeister, 1838

= Aschiphasma =

Genus of stick insects

Aschiphasma is an Asian genus of stick insects in the tribe Aschiphasmatini and is also the type genus for the family. Species currently have a known distribution throughout western Malesia.

== Species ==
Aschiphasma includes the following species:

- Aschiphasma annulipes Westwood, 1834 - type species, locality Java
- Aschiphasma piceum Redtenbacher, 1906
  - synonyms: A. modestum Redtenbacher, 1906, A. viridilineatum Redtenbacher, 1906
