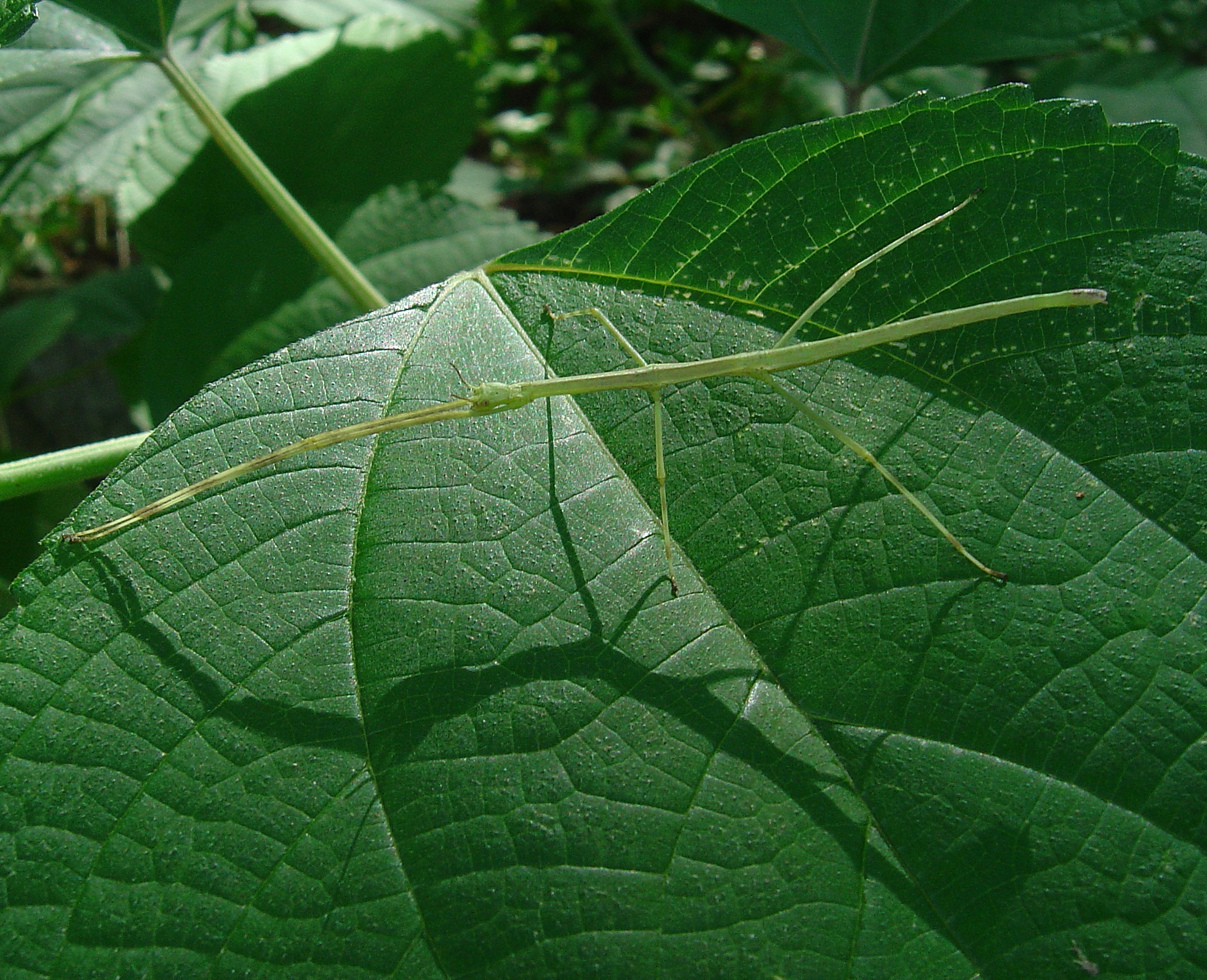
- Baculum irregulariterdentatum

Scientific classification
- Domain: Eukaryota
- Kingdom: Animalia
- Phylum: Arthropoda
- Class: Insecta
- Order: Phasmatodea
- Family: Phasmatidae
- Subfamily: Clitumninae
- Tribe: Clitumnini
- Genus: Ramulus
- Species: R. thaii

Binomial name
- Ramulus thaii (Hausleithner, 1985)

Synonyms
- Baculum thai Masetti, 1987

= Ramulus thaii =

Species of stick insect

Ramulus thaii is a species of stick insect in the tribe Clitumnini. It has been recorded from Thailand and China.
