= Parasosibia =

Scientific classification
- Domain: Eukaryota
- Kingdom: Animalia
- Phylum: Arthropoda
- Class: Insecta
- Order: Phasmatodea
- Family: Lonchodidae
- Subfamily: Necrosciinae
- Tribe: Necrosciini
- Genus: Parasosibia; Redtenbacher, 1908

Genus of insects

Parasosibia is a genus of phasmids belonging to the family Lonchodidae.

Species:

- Parasosibia ceylonica Redtenbacher, 1908
- Parasosibia descendens Redtenbacher, 1908
- Parasosibia incerta Redtenbacher, 1908
- Parasosibia inferior Redtenbacher, 1908
- Parasosibia maculata Redtenbacher, 1908
- Parasosibia parva Redtenbacher, 1908
- Parasosibia villosa Redtenbacher, 1908
