= Ramulus ablutus =

Scientific classification
- Kingdom: Animalia
- Phylum: Arthropoda
- Class: Insecta
- Order: Phasmatodea
- Family: Phasmatidae
- Subfamily: Clitumninae
- Tribe: Clitumnini
- Genus: Ramulus
- Species: R. ablutus

Binomial name
- Ramulus ablutus (Brunner von Wattenwyl, 1907)

Synonyms
- Baculum ablutum (Brunner von Wattenwyl, 1907); Clitumnus ablutus Brunner von Wattenwyl, 1907

Species of stick insect

Ramulus ablutus, is a species of phasmid or stick insect of the genus Ramulus. It is found in Sri Lanka.
