= Prisomera auscultator =

Scientific classification
- Kingdom: Animalia
- Phylum: Arthropoda
- Class: Insecta
- Order: Phasmatodea
- Family: Lonchodidae
- Genus: Prisomera
- Species: P. auscultator

Binomial name
- Prisomera auscultator (Bates, 1865)

Synonyms
- Lonchodes auscultator Bates, 1865; Stheneboea auscultator (Bates, 1865); Sthenoboea auscultator (Bates, 1865)

Species of stick insect

Prisomera auscultator is a species of phasmid or stick insect of the genus Prisomera. It is found in Sri Lanka.
