= Lopaphus srilankensis =

Scientific classification
- Kingdom: Animalia
- Phylum: Arthropoda
- Class: Insecta
- Order: Phasmatodea
- Family: Lonchodidae
- Subfamily: Necrosciinae
- Tribe: Necrosciini
- Genus: Lopaphus
- Species: L. srilankensis

Binomial name
- Lopaphus srilankensis Hennemann, 2002

Species of stick insect

Lopaphus srilankensis, is a species of phasmid or stick insect of the genus Lopaphus. It is found in Sri Lanka. Two subspecies documented. It was first found from Anuradhapura.

== Subspecies ==
- Lopaphus srilankensis montanus Hennemann, 2002
- Lopaphus srilankensis srilankensis Hennemann, 2002
