= Ramulus lobulatus =

Scientific classification
- Kingdom: Animalia
- Phylum: Arthropoda
- Class: Insecta
- Order: Phasmatodea
- Family: Phasmatidae
- Genus: Ramulus
- Species: R. lobulatus

Binomial name
- Ramulus lobulatus (Brunner von Wattenwyl, 1907)

Synonyms
- Baculum lobulatum (Brunner von Wattenwyl, 1907); Cuniculina lobulata Brunner von Wattenwyl, 1907

Species of stick insect

Ramulus lobulatus is a species of phasmid or stick insect. It is found in Sri Lanka.
