= Sipyloidea bistriolata =

Scientific classification
- Kingdom: Animalia
- Phylum: Arthropoda
- Class: Insecta
- Order: Phasmatodea
- Family: Lonchodidae
- Genus: Sipyloidea
- Species: S. bistriolata

Binomial name
- Sipyloidea bistriolata Redtenbacher, 1908

Species of stick insect

Sipyloidea bistriolata is a species of phasmid or stick insect of the genus Sipyloidea. It is found in Sri Lanka.
