= Prisomera spinicollis =

Scientific classification
- Kingdom: Animalia
- Phylum: Arthropoda
- Class: Insecta
- Order: Phasmatodea
- Family: Lonchodidae
- Genus: Prisomera
- Species: P. spinicollis

Binomial name
- Prisomera spinicollis Gray, G.R., 1835

Synonyms
- Greenia ornata Brunner von Wattenwyl, 1907; Lonchodes perlobatus (Brunner von Wattenwyl, 1907); Lonchodes spinicollis (Gray, G.R., 1835); Prisomera perlobatum Brunner von Wattenwyl, 1907; Stheneboea spinicollis (Gray, G.R., 1835)

Species of stick insect

Prisomera spinicollis is a species of phasmid or stick insect of the genus Prisomera. It is found in Sri Lanka.
