= Sipyloidea ceylonica =

Scientific classification
- Kingdom: Animalia
- Phylum: Arthropoda
- Class: Insecta
- Order: Phasmatodea
- Family: Lonchodidae
- Genus: Sipyloidea
- Species: S. ceylonica

Binomial name
- Sipyloidea ceylonica (Saussure, 1868)

Synonyms
- Necroscia ceylonica Saussure, 1868; Sipyloidea (Rhamphosipyloidea) ceylonica (Saussure, 1868)

Species of stick insect

Sipyloidea ceylonica is a species of phasmid (or stick insect) in the genus Sipyloidea, described by Henri Louis Frédéric de Saussure in 1868 from Sri Lanka.
