= Lonchodes praon =

Scientific classification
- Kingdom: Animalia
- Phylum: Arthropoda
- Class: Insecta
- Order: Phasmatodea
- Family: Lonchodidae
- Genus: Lonchodes
- Species: L. praon

Binomial name
- Lonchodes praon Westwood, 1859

Synonyms
- Staelonchodes praon (Westwood, 1859); Stheneboea (Medaura) praon (Westwood, 1859)

Species of stick insect

Lonchodes praon, is a species of phasmid or stick insect found in Sri Lanka.
