= Sosibia quadrispinosa =

Scientific classification
- Kingdom: Animalia
- Phylum: Arthropoda
- Class: Insecta
- Order: Phasmatodea
- Family: Lonchodidae
- Subfamily: Necrosciinae
- Tribe: Necrosciini
- Genus: Sosibia
- Species: S. quadrispinosa

Binomial name
- Sosibia quadrispinosa Redtenbacher, 1908

Species of insect

Sosibia quadrispinosa, is a species of phasmid or leaf insect of the genus Sosibia. It is found in Sri Lanka.
