= Prisomera mimas =

Scientific classification
- Kingdom: Animalia
- Phylum: Arthropoda
- Class: Insecta
- Order: Phasmatodea
- Family: Lonchodidae
- Genus: Prisomera
- Species: P. mimas

Binomial name
- Prisomera mimas (Westwood, 1859)

Synonyms
- Acanthoderus mimas Westwood, 1859; Menexenus mimas (Westwood, 1859); Stheneboea mimas (Westwood, 1859)

Species of stick insect

Prisomera mimas is a species of phasmid or stick insect of the genus Prisomera. It is found in Sri Lanka.
