= Paramenexenus inconspicuus =

Scientific classification
- Kingdom: Animalia
- Phylum: Arthropoda
- Class: Insecta
- Order: Phasmatodea
- Family: Lonchodidae
- Genus: Paramenexenus
- Species: P. inconspicuus

Binomial name
- Paramenexenus inconspicuus Redtenbacher, 1908

Species of stick insect

Paramenexenus inconspicuus is a species of phasmid or stick insect of the genus Paramenexenus. It is found in Sri Lanka.
