= Parasipyloidea minuta =

Scientific classification
- Kingdom: Animalia
- Phylum: Arthropoda
- Class: Insecta
- Order: Phasmatodea
- Family: Lonchodidae
- Genus: Parasipyloidea
- Species: P. minuta

Binomial name
- Parasipyloidea minuta Redtenbacher, 1908

Species of stick insect

Parasipyloidea minuta is a species of phasmid or stick insect of the genus Parasipyloidea. It is found in Sri Lanka.
