= Paramenexenus ceylonicus =

Scientific classification
- Kingdom: Animalia
- Phylum: Arthropoda
- Class: Insecta
- Order: Phasmatodea
- Family: Lonchodidae
- Genus: Paramenexenus
- Species: P. ceylonicus

Binomial name
- Paramenexenus ceylonicus (Saussure, 1868)

Synonyms
- Anophelepis ceylonica Saussure, 1868; Oxyartes ceylonica (Saussure, 1868); Paramenexenus molestus Redtenbacher, 1908

Species of stick insect

Paramenexenus ceylonicus is a species of phasmid or stick insect of the genus Paramenexenus. It is found in Sri Lanka.
