= Parasipyloidea seiferti =

Scientific classification
- Kingdom: Animalia
- Phylum: Arthropoda
- Class: Insecta
- Order: Phasmatodea
- Family: Lonchodidae
- Genus: Parasipyloidea
- Species: P. seiferti

Binomial name
- Parasipyloidea seiferti Hennemann, 2002

Species of stick insect

Parasipyloidea seiferti is a species of phasmid or stick insect of the genus Parasipyloidea. It is found in Sri Lanka. It is first described from Nuwara Eliya.
