= Parasipyloidea zehntneri =

Scientific classification
- Kingdom: Animalia
- Phylum: Arthropoda
- Class: Insecta
- Order: Phasmatodea
- Family: Lonchodidae
- Genus: Parasipyloidea
- Species: P. zehntneri

Binomial name
- Parasipyloidea zehntneri Redtenbacher, 1908

Species of stick insect

Parasipyloidea zehntneri, or the thin grass stick insect, is a species of phasmid or stick insect of the genus Parasipyloidea. It is found in Sri Lanka.
