= Sipyloidea acutipennis =

Scientific classification
- Kingdom: Animalia
- Phylum: Arthropoda
- Class: Insecta
- Order: Phasmatodea
- Family: Lonchodidae
- Genus: Sipyloidea
- Species: S. acutipennis

Binomial name
- Sipyloidea acutipennis (Bates, 1865)

Synonyms
- Necroscia acutipennis Bates, 1865

Species of stick insect

Sipyloidea acutipennis is a species of phasmid or stick insect of the genus Sipyloidea. It is found in Sri Lanka.
