= Trachythorax expallescens =

Scientific classification
- Kingdom: Animalia
- Phylum: Arthropoda
- Class: Insecta
- Order: Phasmatodea
- Family: Lonchodidae
- Genus: Trachythorax
- Species: T. expallescens

Binomial name
- Trachythorax expallescens Redtenbacher, 1908

Species of stick insect

Trachythorax expallescens is a species of phasmid or stick insect of the genus Trachythorax. It is found in Sri Lanka.
