= Ramulus lineaticeps =

Scientific classification
- Kingdom: Animalia
- Phylum: Arthropoda
- Class: Insecta
- Order: Phasmatodea
- Family: Phasmatidae
- Genus: Ramulus
- Species: R. lineaticeps

Binomial name
- Ramulus lineaticeps (Brunner von Wattenwyl, 1907)

Synonyms
- Baculum lineaticeps (Brunner von Wattenwyl, 1907); Clitumnus lineaticeps Brunner von Wattenwyl, 1907

Species of stick insect

Ramulus lineaticeps is a species of phasmid or stick insect. It is found in Sri Lanka.
