= Paraprisomera taprobanae =

Scientific classification
- Kingdom: Animalia
- Phylum: Arthropoda
- Class: Insecta
- Order: Phasmatodea
- Family: Lonchodidae
- Genus: Paraprisomera
- Species: P. taprobanae

Binomial name
- Paraprisomera taprobanae (Westwood, 1859)

Synonyms
- Lonchodes taprobanae Westwood, 1859; Paraprisomera tabrobanae Otte & Brock, 2005; Prisomera taprobanae (Westwood, 1859); Sthenoboea taprobanae (Westwood, 1859)

Species of stick insect

Paraprisomera taprobanae, is a species of phasmid or stick insect of the genus Paraprisomera. It is found in Sri Lanka.
