= Parasosibia incerta =

Scientific classification
- Kingdom: Animalia
- Phylum: Arthropoda
- Class: Insecta
- Order: Phasmatodea
- Family: Lonchodidae
- Genus: Parasosibia
- Species: P. incerta

Binomial name
- Parasosibia incerta Redtenbacher, 1908

Species of stick insect

Parasosibia incerta is a species of phasmid or stick insect of the genus Parasosibia. It is found in Sri Lanka.
