= Prisomera ignava =

Scientific classification
- Kingdom: Animalia
- Phylum: Arthropoda
- Class: Insecta
- Order: Phasmatodea
- Family: Lonchodidae
- Genus: Prisomera
- Species: P. ignava

Binomial name
- Prisomera ignava (Brunner von Wattenwyl, 1907)

Synonyms
- Greenia ignava Brunner von Wattenwyl, 1907

Species of stick insect

Prisomera ignava is a species of phasmid or stick insect of the genus Prisomera. It is found in Sri Lanka.
