= Ramulus braggi =

Scientific classification
- Kingdom: Animalia
- Phylum: Arthropoda
- Class: Insecta
- Order: Phasmatodea
- Family: Phasmatidae
- Genus: Ramulus
- Species: R. braggi

Binomial name
- Ramulus braggi Hennemann, 2002

Synonyms
- Clitumnus humberti Carl, 1913; Ramulus carli Zompro, 2003

Species of stick insect

Ramulus braggi, is a species of phasmid or stick insect. It is found in Sri Lanka.
