= Lonchodes denticauda =

Scientific classification
- Kingdom: Animalia
- Phylum: Arthropoda
- Class: Insecta
- Order: Phasmatodea
- Family: Lonchodidae
- Genus: Lonchodes
- Species: L. denticauda

Binomial name
- Lonchodes denticauda Bates, 1865

Synonyms
- Staelonchodes denticauda (Bates, 1865)

Species of stick insect

Lonchodes denticauda, is a species of phasmid or stick insect found in Sri Lanka.
