= Sosibia passalus =

Scientific classification
- Kingdom: Animalia
- Phylum: Arthropoda
- Class: Insecta
- Order: Phasmatodea
- Family: Lonchodidae
- Genus: Sosibia
- Species: S. passalus

Binomial name
- Sosibia passalus (Westwood, 1859)

Synonyms
- Necroscia passalus Westwood, 1859

Species of leaf insect

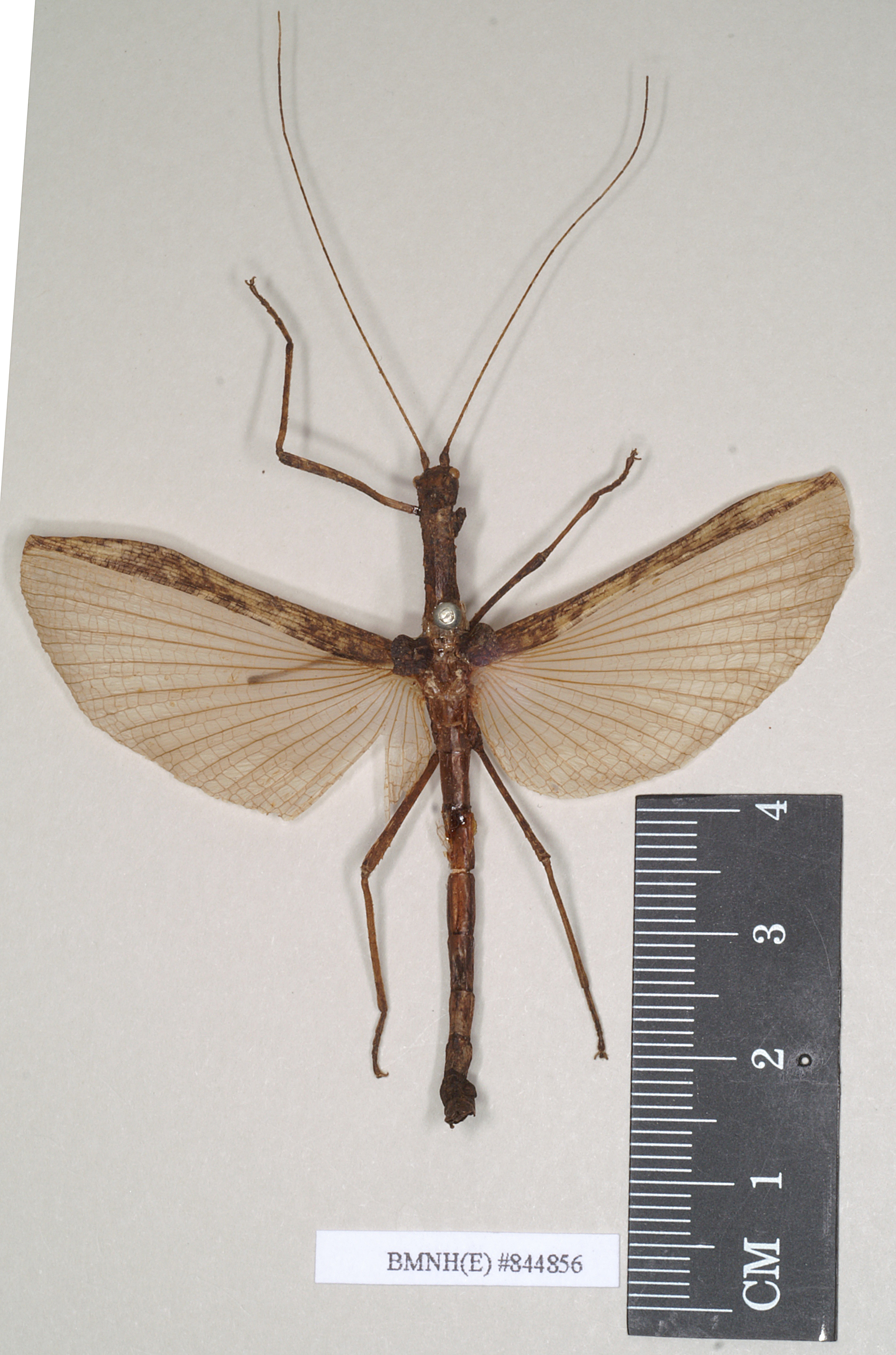
Sosibia passalus

Sosibia passalus is a species of phasmid or leaf insect of the genus Sosibia. It is found in Sri Lanka.
