= Prisomera spinosissimum =

Scientific classification
- Kingdom: Animalia
- Phylum: Arthropoda
- Class: Insecta
- Order: Phasmatodea
- Family: Lonchodidae
- Genus: Prisomera
- Species: P. spinosissimum

Binomial name
- Prisomera spinosissimum (Brunner von Wattenwyl, 1907)

Synonyms
- Prisomera spinosissima (Brunner von Wattenwyl, 1907); Stheneboea spinosissima Brunner von Wattenwyl, 1907

Species of stick insect

Prisomera spinosissimum is a species of phasmid or stick insect of the genus Prisomera. It is found in India, Sri Lanka and Malaysia.
