= Sipyloidea panaetius =

Scientific classification
- Kingdom: Animalia
- Phylum: Arthropoda
- Class: Insecta
- Order: Phasmatodea
- Family: Lonchodidae
- Genus: Sipyloidea
- Species: S. panaetius

Binomial name
- Sipyloidea panaetius (Westwood, 1859)

Synonyms
- Necroscia panaetius Westwood, 1859

Species of stick insect

Sipyloidea panaetius is a species of phasmid or stick insect of the genus Sipyloidea. It is found in Sri Lanka.
