= Paraprisomera coronata =

Scientific classification
- Kingdom: Animalia
- Phylum: Arthropoda
- Class: Insecta
- Order: Phasmatodea
- Family: Lonchodidae
- Genus: Paraprisomera
- Species: P. coronata

Binomial name
- Paraprisomera coronata (Brunner von Wattenwyl, 1907)

Synonyms
- Clitumnus coronatus Brunner von Wattenwyl, 1907; Lonchodes degeneratus (Brunner von Wattenwyl, 1907); Prisomera coronatum (Brunner von Wattenwyl, 1907); Prisomera degeneratum Brunner von Wattenwyl, 1907; Prisomera modestissimum Brunner von Wattenwyl, 1907; Prisomera oppositifolia (Brunner von Wattenwyl, 1907); Ramulus coronatus (Brunner von Wattenwyl, 1907); Stheneboea esuriens Brunner von Wattenwyl, 1907; Stheneboea obtuselobata Brunner von Wattenwyl, 1907; Stheneboea oppositifolia Brunner von Wattenwyl, 1907; Stheneboea rarolobatum Brunner von Wattenwyl, 1907

Species of stick insect

Paraprisomera coronata, is a species of phasmid or stick insect of the genus Paraprisomera. It is found in Sri Lanka.
