= Miniphasma secunda =

Scientific classification
- Kingdom: Animalia
- Phylum: Arthropoda
- Clade: Pancrustacea
- Class: Insecta
- Order: Phasmatodea
- Family: Phasmatidae
- Genus: Miniphasma
- Species: M. secunda

Binomial name
- Miniphasma secunda (Zompro, 1999)

Synonyms
- Microphasma secunda Zompro, 1999

Species of stick insect

Miniphasma secunda is a species of phasmid or stick insect of the genus Miniphasma. It is found in Sri Lanka.
