= Trachythorax sparaxes =

Scientific classification
- Kingdom: Animalia
- Phylum: Arthropoda
- Class: Insecta
- Order: Phasmatodea
- Family: Lonchodidae
- Genus: Trachythorax
- Species: T. sparaxes

Binomial name
- Trachythorax sparaxes (Westwood, 1859)

Synonyms
- Necroscia sparaxes Westwood, 1859

Species of stick insect

Trachythorax sparaxes is a species of phasmid or stick insect of the genus Trachythorax. It is found in India and Sri Lanka.
