= Lonchodes femoralis =

Scientific classification
- Kingdom: Animalia
- Phylum: Arthropoda
- Class: Insecta
- Order: Phasmatodea
- Family: Lonchodidae
- Subfamily: Lonchodinae
- Tribe: Lonchodini
- Genus: Lonchodes
- Species: L. femoralis

Binomial name
- Lonchodes femoralis Brunner von Wattenwyl, 1907

Species of stick insect

Lonchodes femoralis, is a species of phasmid or stick insect found in Sri Lanka.
