= Ramulus pseudoporus =

Scientific classification
- Kingdom: Animalia
- Phylum: Arthropoda
- Class: Insecta
- Order: Phasmatodea
- Family: Phasmatidae
- Subfamily: Clitumninae
- Tribe: Clitumnini
- Genus: Ramulus
- Species: R. pseudoporus

Binomial name
- Ramulus pseudoporus (Westwood, 1859)

Synonyms
- Bacillus (Ramulus) humberti Saussure, 1862; Baculum pseudoporus (Westwood, 1859); Clitumnus pseudoporus (Westwood, 1859); Lonchodes pseudoporus Westwood, 1859; Ramulus humberti (Saussure, 1862)

Species of insect

Ramulus pseudoporus is the type species of the genus Ramulus: a phasmid or stick insect. It is found in Sri Lanka.
