= Lonchodes flavicornis =

Scientific classification
- Kingdom: Animalia
- Phylum: Arthropoda
- Class: Insecta
- Order: Phasmatodea
- Family: Lonchodidae
- Subfamily: Lonchodinae
- Tribe: Lonchodini
- Genus: Lonchodes
- Species: L. flavicornis

Binomial name
- Lonchodes flavicornis Bates, 1865

Synonyms
- Staelonchodes flavicornis (Bates, 1865)

Species of stick insect

Lonchodes flavicornis, is a species of phasmid or stick insect found in Sri Lanka.
