= Prisomera cyllabacum =

Scientific classification
- Kingdom: Animalia
- Phylum: Arthropoda
- Class: Insecta
- Order: Phasmatodea
- Family: Lonchodidae
- Genus: Prisomera
- Species: P. cyllabacum

Binomial name
- Prisomera cyllabacum (Westwood, 1859)

Synonyms
- Lonchodes cyllabacus Westwood, 1859; Stheneboea cyllabacus (Westwood, 1859); Sthenoboea cyllabacus (Westwood, 1859)

Species of stick insect

Prisomera cyllabacum is a species of phasmid or stick insect of the genus Prisomera. It is found in Sri Lanka.
