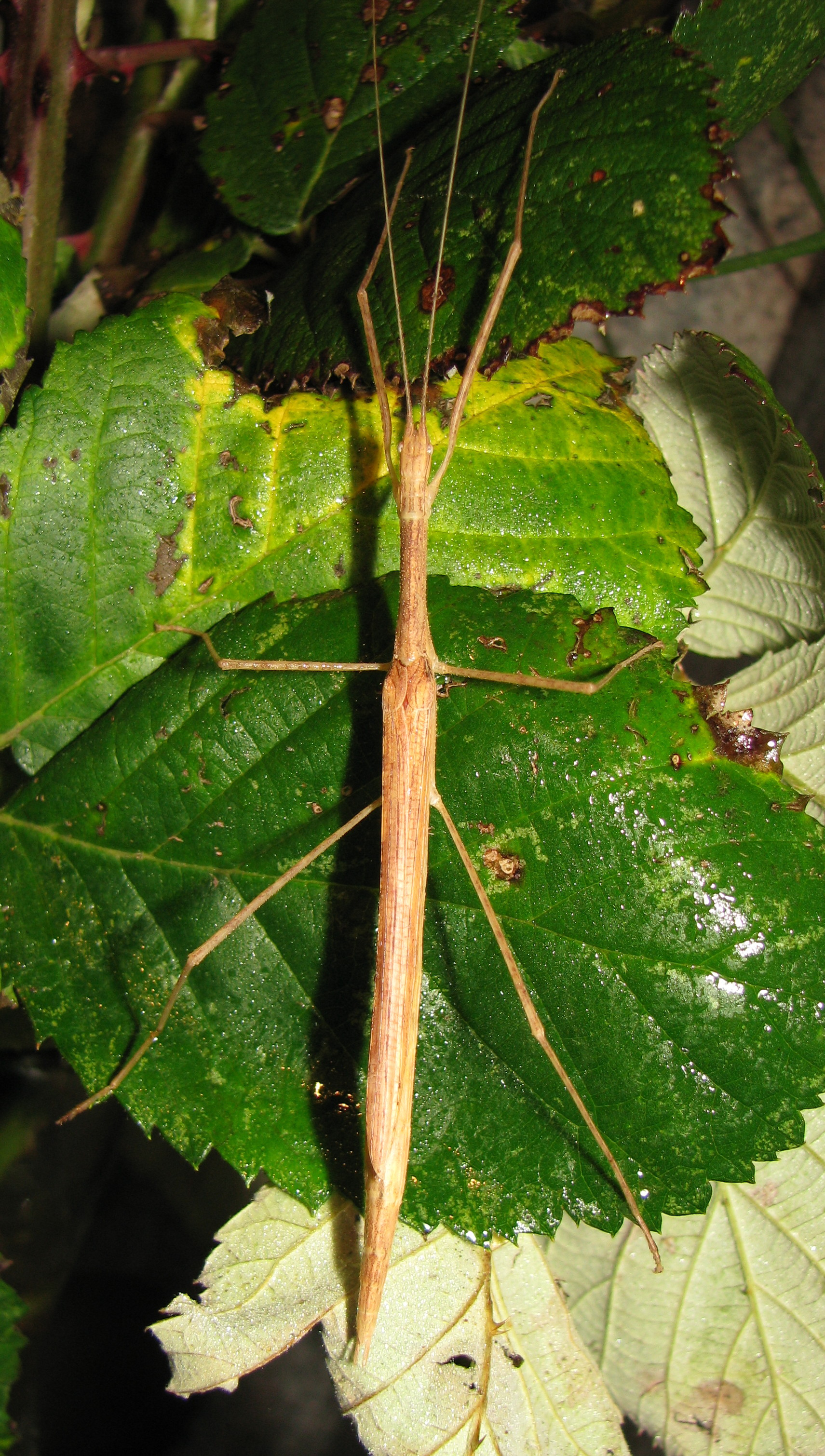

Scientific classification
- Kingdom: Animalia
- Phylum: Arthropoda
- Class: Insecta
- Order: Phasmatodea
- Family: Lonchodidae
- Genus: Sipyloidea
- Species: S. sipylus

Binomial name
- Sipyloidea sipylus (Westwood, 1859)

Synonyms
- Necroscia sipylus Westwood, 1859

= Sipyloidea sipylus =

Species of stick insect

Sipyloidea sipylus, the pink winged stick insect or Madagascan stick insect, is a species of phasmid or stick insect of the genus Sipyloidea. It is the most widespread phasmid in the world, can be found throughout tropical Asia and parts of Southeast Asia.
