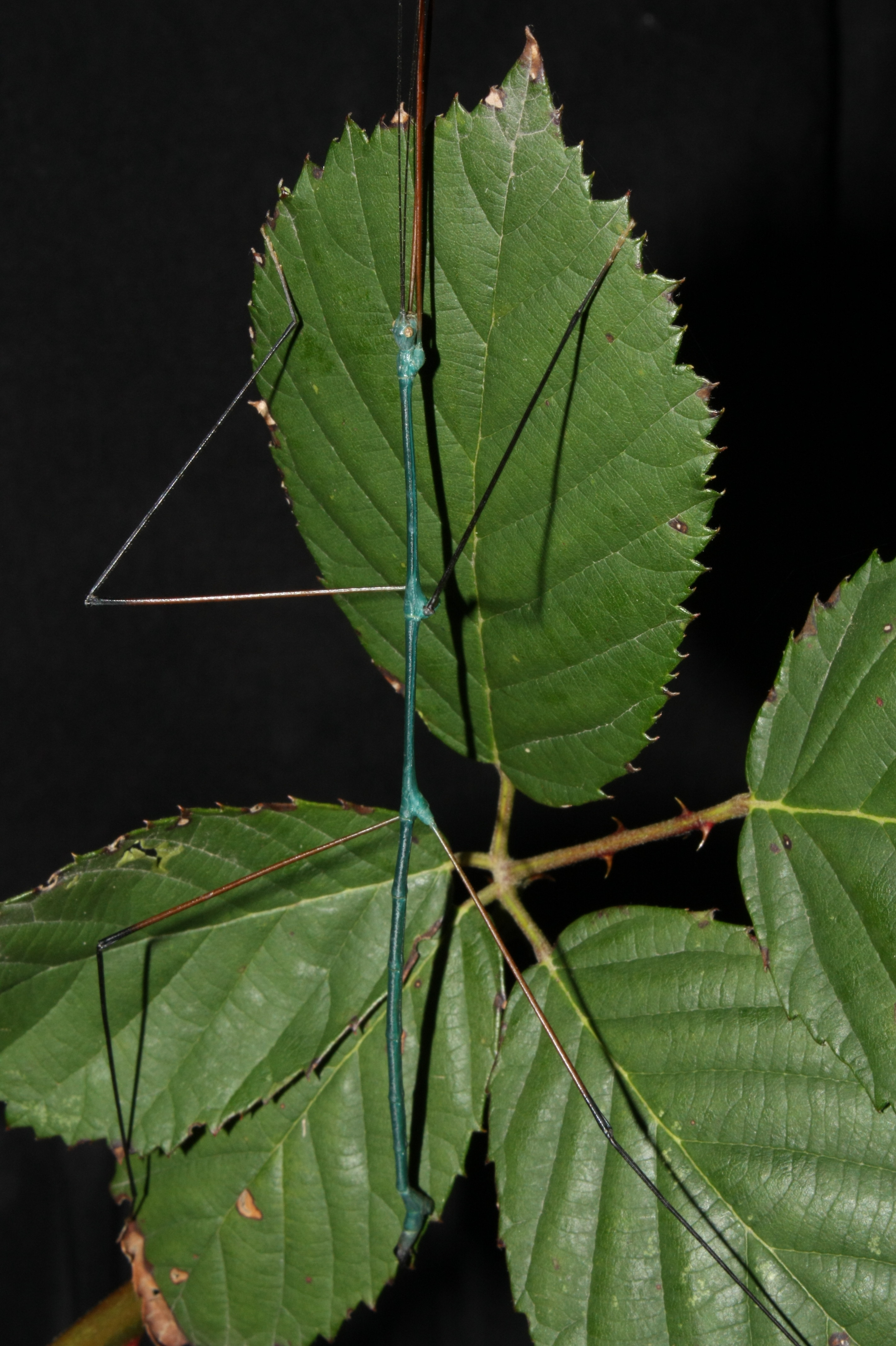
- Ramulus nematodes

Scientific classification
- Domain: Eukaryota
- Kingdom: Animalia
- Phylum: Arthropoda
- Class: Insecta
- Order: Phasmatodea
- Family: Phasmatidae
- Subfamily: Clitumninae
- Tribe: Clitumnini
- Genus: Ramulus; Saussure, 1862

Synonyms
- Clitumnus Stål, 1875; Dagys Günther, 1935; Dubreuilia Brunner von Wattenwyl, 1907; Paraclitumnus Brunner von Wattenwyl, 1893

= Ramulus =

Genus of stick insects

Ramulus is an Asian genus of stick insects in the family Phasmatidae and tribe Clitumnini.

== Species ==
The type species is Ramulus pseudoporus (Westwood, 1859) (as Bacillus (Ramulus) humberti Saussure from Sri Lanka: described by Carl Stål as Clitumnus pseudoporus, from which the genus and subfamily names are derived).

The Phasmida Species File currently lists:

1. Ramulus ablutus (Brunner von Wattenwyl, 1907)
2. Ramulus aboricus (Giglio-Tos, 1914)
3. Ramulus acutus (Chen & He, 2004)
4. Ramulus alauna (Westwood, 1859)
5. Ramulus alienus (Brunner von Wattenwyl, 1907)
6. Ramulus altissimus (Chen & Zhang, 2008)
7. Ramulus amathia (Westwood, 1859)
8. Ramulus anceps (Brunner von Wattenwyl, 1907)
9. Ramulus angustior (Brunner von Wattenwyl, 1907)
10. Ramulus annuliventris (Chen & He, 2004)
11. Ramulus antennatus (Chen & Li, 2002)
12. Ramulus anterior (Brunner von Wattenwyl, 1907)
13. Ramulus apicalis (Chen & He, 1994)
14. Ramulus arrogans (Brunner von Wattenwyl, 1907)
15. Ramulus artemis (Westwood, 1859)
16. Ramulus asaphus (Chen & He, 1992)
17. Ramulus baishuijiangius (Chen, 1992)
18. Ramulus bannaensis (Chen, Shang & Pei, 2000)
19. Ramulus bicolor (Carl, 1913)
20. Ramulus bidentatus (Brunner von Wattenwyl, 1907)
21. Ramulus bifarius (Chen & He, 2008)
22. Ramulus bilineatus (Brunner von Wattenwyl, 1907)
23. Ramulus bomiense (Chen & He, 1994)
24. Ramulus brachycerus (Chen & He, 1995)
25. Ramulus braggi Hennemann, 2002
26. Ramulus brevianalus (Chen & He, 2008)
27. Ramulus brevicercatus (Chen, 1999)
28. Ramulus brunneus (Chen & He, 1993)
29. Ramulus caii (Brock & Seow-Choen, 2000)
30. Ramulus capitatus (Brunner von Wattenwyl, 1907)
31. Ramulus ceylonensis Otte & Brock, 2005
32. Ramulus chongxinense (Chen & He, 1991)
33. Ramulus concisus (Brunner von Wattenwyl, 1893)
34. Ramulus coomani (Chen & Shang, 2002)
35. Ramulus cylindriceps (Brunner von Wattenwyl, 1907)
36. Ramulus decolyi (Brunner von Wattenwyl, 1907)
37. Ramulus detrectans (Brunner von Wattenwyl, 1907)
38. Ramulus diaoluoshanense Ho, 2013
39. Ramulus diversus (Brunner von Wattenwyl, 1907)
40. Ramulus dubiosus (Brunner von Wattenwyl, 1907)
41. Ramulus ecarinatus (Bi & Lian, 1991)
42. Ramulus edentatus (Brunner von Wattenwyl, 1907)
43. Ramulus elaboratus (Brunner von Wattenwyl, 1907)
44. Ramulus emendatus (Brunner von Wattenwyl, 1907)
45. Ramulus eminens (Brunner von Wattenwyl, 1907)
46. Ramulus extensus Hennemann, 2021
47. Ramulus fasciatus (Chen & He, 2006)
48. Ramulus femoratus (Chen, 1999)
49. Ramulus filiformis (Herbst, 1786)
50. Ramulus fissicornis (Brunner von Wattenwyl, 1907)
51. Ramulus flavofasciatus (Chen & He, 1993)
52. Ramulus flavovittatus (Chen & Li, 2002)
53. Ramulus folioantennatus Seow-Choen, 2018
54. Ramulus formosanus (Shiraki, 1935)
55. Ramulus fruhstorferi (Brunner von Wattenwyl, 1907)
56. Ramulus frustrans (Brunner von Wattenwyl, 1907)
57. Ramulus fuscolineatus (Wood-Mason, 1873)
58. Ramulus fuscothoracicus (Liu & Cai, 1992)
59. Ramulus gansuense (Chen & Wang, 2005)
60. Ramulus gestri (Brunner von Wattenwyl, 1907)
61. Ramulus giganteus (Chen & Li, 2002)
62. Ramulus globosicaput (Brunner von Wattenwyl, 1907)
63. Ramulus grandis (Chen & He, 2006)
64. Ramulus granulatus (Shiraki, 1935)
65. Ramulus granulosus (Chen & He, 1992)
66. Ramulus hainanense (Chen & He, 2002)
67. Ramulus henanensis (Chen, 2002)
68. Ramulus hoi Brock & Büscher, 2022
69. Ramulus huayingense (Chen & He, 1997)
70. Ramulus humberti (Saussure, 1862)
71. Ramulus hydrocephalus (Brunner von Wattenwyl, 1907)
72. Ramulus impiger (Brunner von Wattenwyl, 1907)
73. Ramulus inermus (Bi, 1992)
74. Ramulus ingerens (Brunner von Wattenwyl, 1907)
75. Ramulus interdentatus (Chen, 1999)
76. Ramulus interruptus (Chen & He, 2008)
77. Ramulus intersulcatus (Chen & He, 1991)
78. Ramulus jianfenglingense (Chen & He, 2008)
79. Ramulus jigongshanense (Chen & Li, 1999)
80. Ramulus jinnanense (Chen, 1992)
81. Ramulus jinxiuense (Chen & He, 2008)
82. Ramulus kangxianense (Chen & Wang, 2005)
83. Ramulus laevigatus (Wood-Mason, 1873)
84. Ramulus lanceus Liu & Cai, 1992
85. Ramulus lianxianense (Chen, He & Chen, 2000)
86. Ramulus liboensis (Chen & Ran, 2002)
87. Ramulus lineaticeps (Brunner von Wattenwyl, 1907)
88. Ramulus lineatus (Brunner von Wattenwyl, 1893)
89. Ramulus lineatus (Liu & Cai, 1992)
90. Ramulus lobipes (Brunner von Wattenwyl, 1907)
91. Ramulus lobulatus (Brunner von Wattenwyl, 1907)
92. Ramulus longianalus (Chen & He, 2008)
93. Ramulus longmenense (Chen & He, 2008)
94. Ramulus luopingense (Chen & Yin, 1995)
95. Ramulus magnus (Brunner von Wattenwyl, 1907)
96. Ramulus maoershanense (Chen & He, 1993)
97. Ramulus maolanense (Chen & Ran, 2002)
98. Ramulus mediocris (Brunner von Wattenwyl, 1907)
99. Ramulus melanurus Hennemann, 2021
100. Ramulus mikado (Rehn, 1904)
101. Ramulus nematodes (de Haan, 1842)
102. Ramulus neomodestus Otte & Brock, 2005
103. Ramulus nigrifactus (Chen & Li, 2002)
104. Ramulus nigrodentatus (Chen & Yin, 1996)
105. Ramulus nigrolineatus (Chen & He, 1997)
106. Ramulus oberthuri (Brunner von Wattenwyl, 1907)
107. Ramulus obliquus (Chen & He, 1995)
108. Ramulus operculatus (Brunner von Wattenwyl, 1907)
109. Ramulus paulus (Chen & He, 1994)
110. Ramulus pelengense Hennemann, Le Tirant & Purwanto, 2021
111. Ramulus penthesilea (Wood-Mason, 1873)
112. Ramulus perfidus (Giglio-Tos, 1914)
113. Ramulus phalangodes (Bates, 1865)
114. Ramulus philippinicus (Brunner von Wattenwyl, 1907)
115. Ramulus phyllodeus (Chen & He, 2008)
116. Ramulus pingliense (Chen & He, 1991)
117. Ramulus platycercatus (Chen & He, 2008)
118. Ramulus productus (Brunner von Wattenwyl, 1893)
119. Ramulus pseudoarrogans (Chen & He, 2008)
120. Ramulus pseudoporus (Westwood, 1859)
121. Ramulus recessus (Brunner von Wattenwyl, 1907)
122. Ramulus redemptus (Brunner von Wattenwyl, 1907)
123. Ramulus robinius (Cai, 1993)
124. Ramulus rotundus (Chen & He, 1992)
125. Ramulus rotunginus (Giglio-Tos, 1914)
126. Ramulus russellii (Bates, 1865)
127. Ramulus rusticus (Stål, 1877)
128. Ramulus scalpratus Liu & Cai, 1992
129. Ramulus serrulatus (Brunner von Wattenwyl, 1907)
130. Ramulus sparsidentatus (Chen & He, 1992)
131. Ramulus sparsihirtus (Chen & He, 1992)
132. Ramulus spatulatus (Bi, 1992)
133. Ramulus spinulosus (Chen & Wang, 2005)
134. Ramulus stilpnoides (Kirby, 1888)
135. Ramulus subnematodes (Giebel, 1861)
136. Ramulus superbus (Carl, 1913)
137. Ramulus superfluus (Brunner von Wattenwyl, 1907)
138. Ramulus supernumerarius (Brunner von Wattenwyl, 1907)
139. Ramulus thaii (Hausleithner, 1985)
140. Ramulus tianmushanense (Chen & He, 1995)
141. Ramulus tiantaiensis (Zhou, 1997)
142. Ramulus togianense Hennemann, 2021
143. Ramulus tonkinense (Chen & Shang, 2002)
144. Ramulus torajanus Hennemann, 2021
145. Ramulus ussurianus (Bey-Bienko, 1960)
146. Ramulus verecundus (Brunner von Wattenwyl, 1907)
147. Ramulus verruculosus (Brunner von Wattenwyl, 1893)
148. Ramulus versicolorus (Chen & Wang, 1993)
149. Ramulus vicinus (Chen & Li, 1999)
150. Ramulus viridulus (Chen & Li, 2002)
151. Ramulus warsbergi (Brunner von Wattenwyl, 1907)
152. Ramulus wehse Seow-Choen, 2018
153. Ramulus wenxianense (Chen & Wang, 2005)
154. Ramulus westwoodii (Wood-Mason, 1873)
155. Ramulus wuyishanense (Chen, 1999)
156. Ramulus xiaguanense (Chen & He, 2008)
157. Ramulus xinganense (Chen & He, 1999)
158. Ramulus xingshanense (Chen & He, 1997)
159. Ramulus xixiaense (Chen, 1999)
160. Ramulus yongrenense (Chen & He, 2008)
