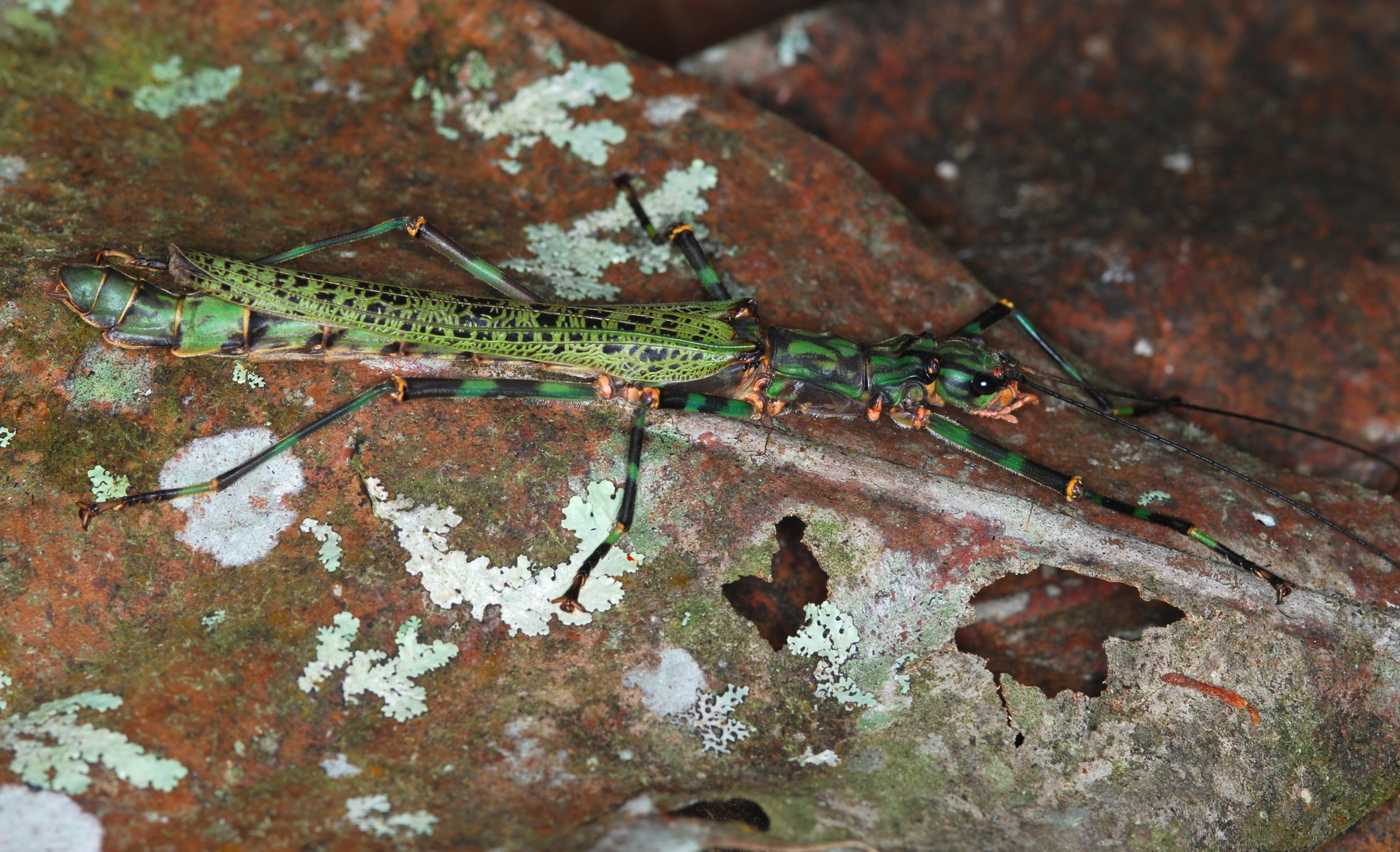
- Aschiphasma annulipes

Scientific classification
- Kingdom: Animalia
- Phylum: Arthropoda
- Clade: Pancrustacea
- Class: Insecta
- Order: Phasmatodea
- Superfamily: Aschiphasmatoidea
- Family: Aschiphasmatidae; Brunner von Wattenwyl, 1893

Synonyms
- Xylobistinae Zompro, 2004

= Aschiphasmatidae =

Family of stick insects

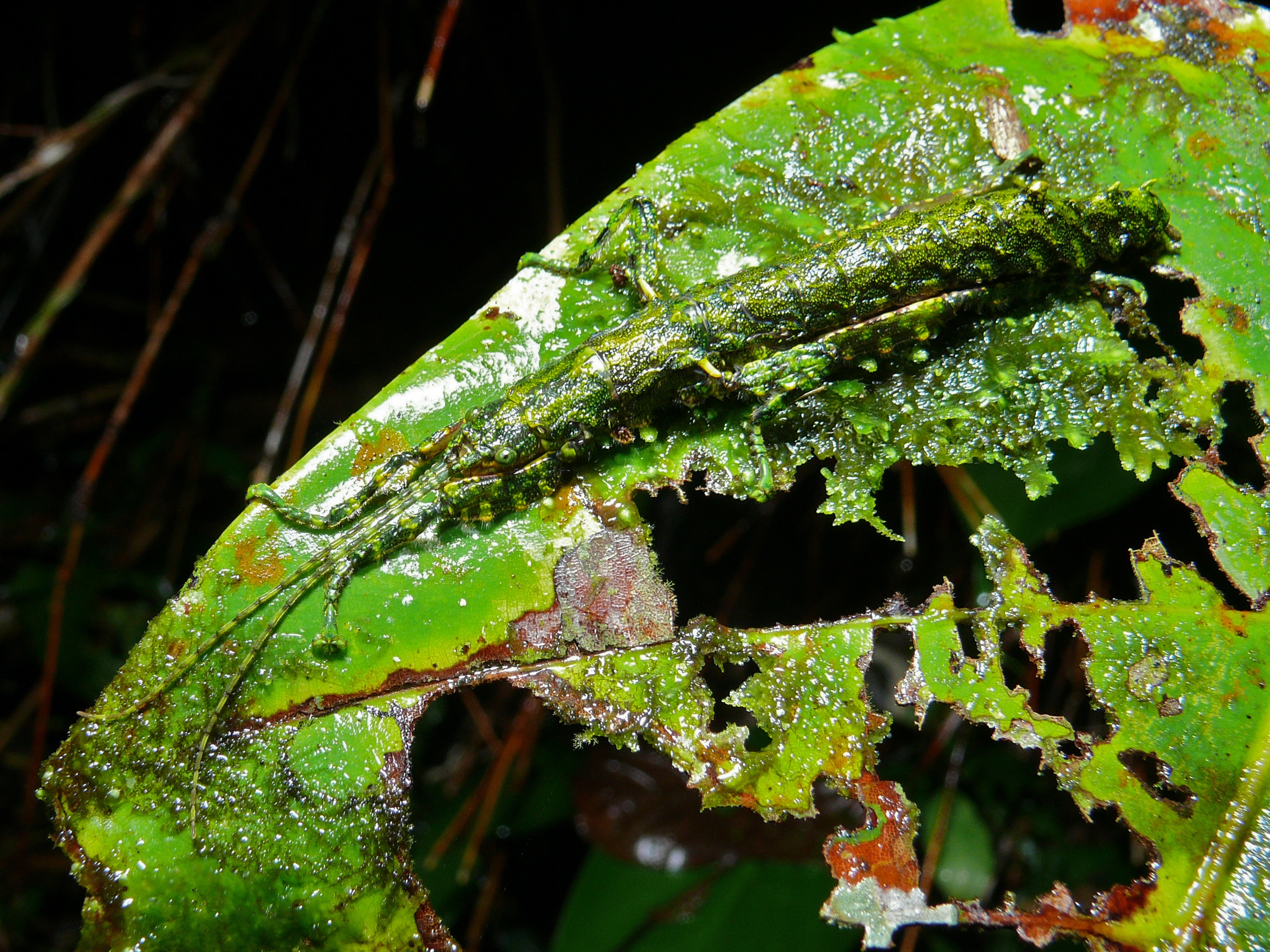
Dinophasma braggi

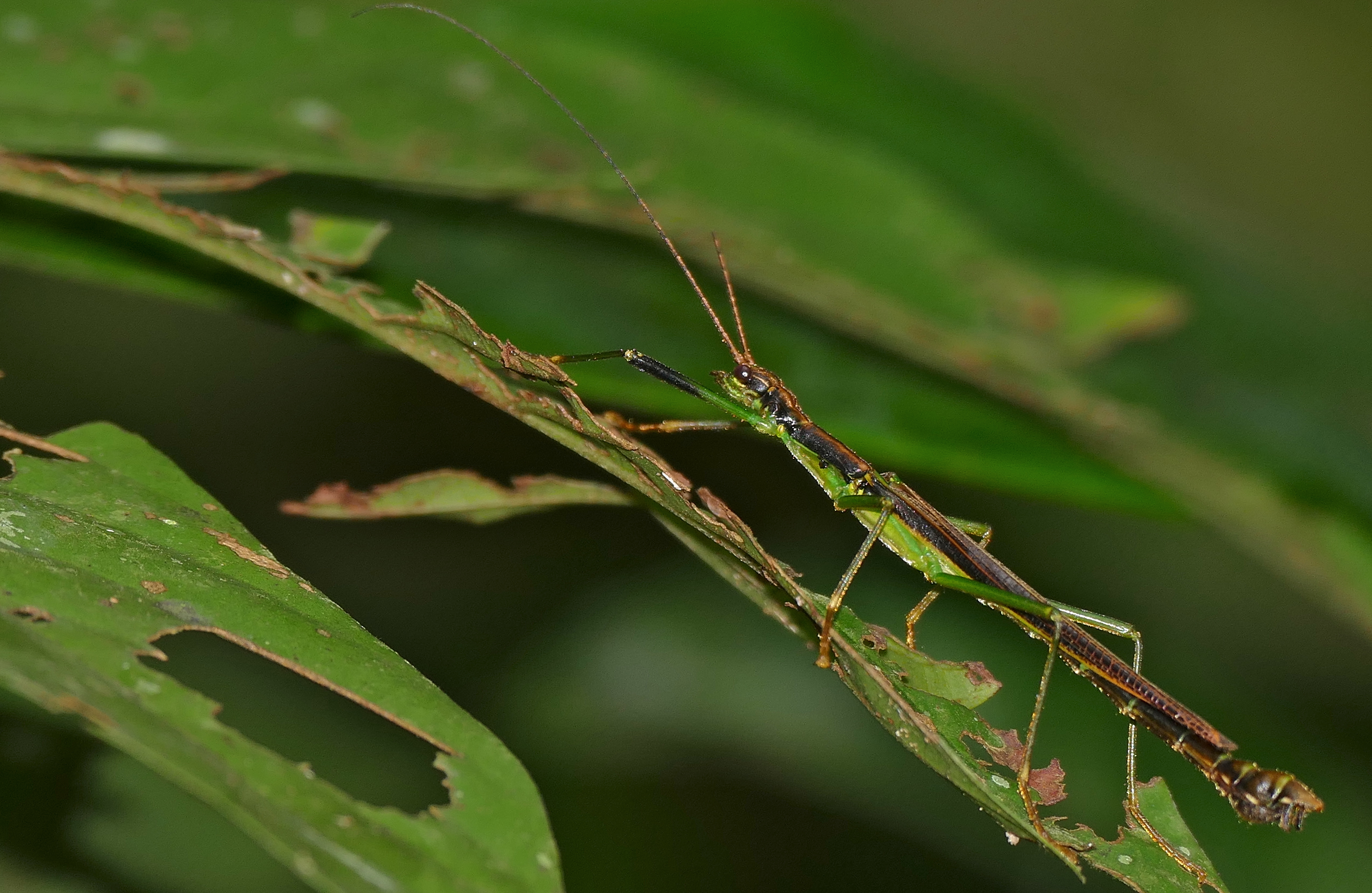
Orthomeria alexis

Aschiphasmatidae are a family of stick insects belonging to the suborder Verophasmatodea; they can be found in Indomalaya.

== Tribes and genera ==
These genera all belong to the subfamily Aschiphasmatinae, placed in two tribes:

=== Aschiphasmatini ===
Authority: Brunner von Wattenwyl, 1893

- Abrosoma Redtenbacher, 1906
- Anoplobistus Bragg, 2001
- Aschiphasma Westwood, 1834
- Chlorobistus Bragg, 2001
- Coloratobistus Zompro, 2004
- Dallaiphasma Gottardo, 2011
- Dinophasma Uvarov, 1940
- Duocornubistus Seow-Choen, 2017
- Eurybistus Bragg, 2001
- Kerabistus Bragg, 2001
- Leurophasma Bi, 1995
- Ommatopseudes Günther, 1942
- Orthomeria Kirby, 1904
- Parabrosoma Giglio-Tos, 1910
- Parorthomeria Bragg, 2006
- Pectodajaca Seow-Choen, 2018
- Presbistus Kirby, 1896
- Yongtsuius Bragg, 2001

=== Dajacini ===
Monotypic, authority: Bragg, 2001

- Dajaca Brunner von Wattenwyl, 1893
