= C. proximus =

C. proximus may refer to:

- Carausius proximus, a phasmid species
- Chrosiothes proximus, a spider species in the genus Chrosiothes
- Conus proximus, a snail species
- Cymbopogon proximus, a grass species

== See also ==
- Proximus (disambiguation)
