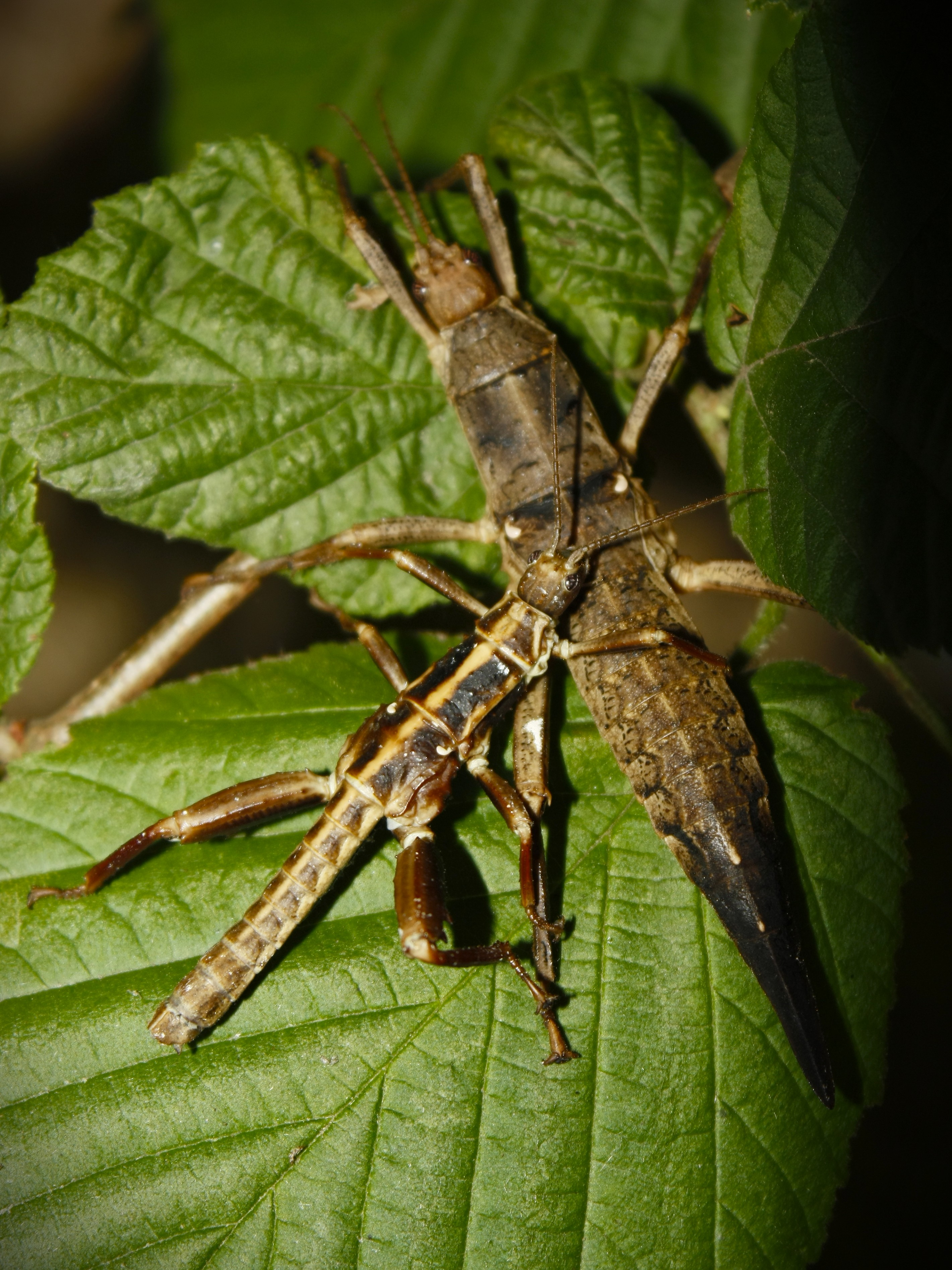
- Canachus crocodilus, pair

Scientific classification
- Kingdom: Animalia
- Phylum: Arthropoda
- Clade: Pancrustacea
- Class: Insecta
- Order: Phasmatodea
- Family: Lonchodidae
- Subfamily: Lonchodinae
- Tribe: Eurycanthini
- Genus: Canachus
- Species: C. crocodilus

Binomial name
- Canachus crocodilus Stål, 1875

= Canachus crocodilus =

Species of stick insect

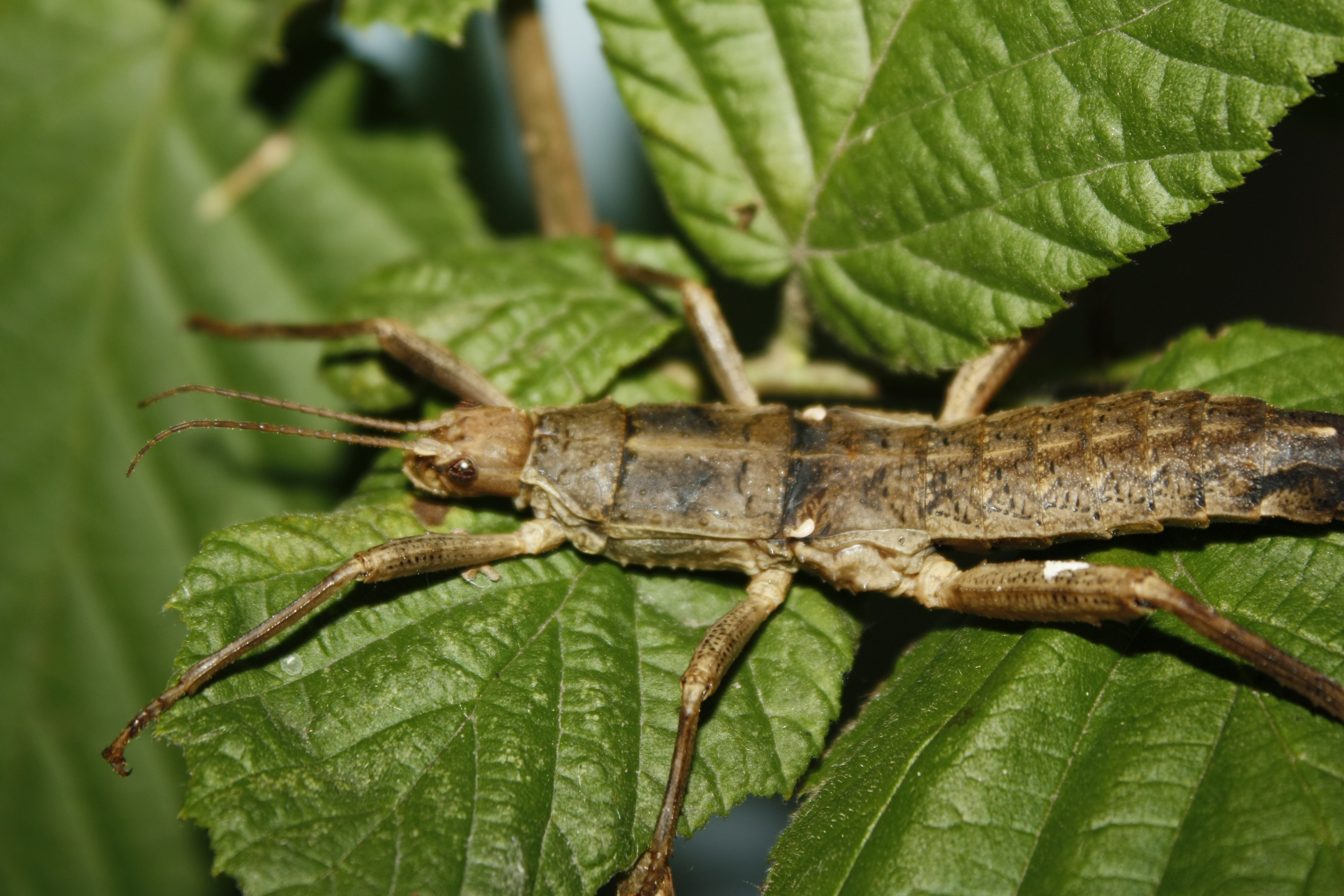
Female

Canachus crocodilus is a species of stick insect from New Caledonia that was described as early as 1875.

== Description ==
Males of Canachus crocodilus measure approximately 40 millimetres (1.6 in) in length, while females are around 65 millimetres (2.6 in) long, making this species one of the smaller members of the genus. The body surface is sparsely granulated and unlike that of most other Canachus species, lacks spines or thorns. Like all members of the genus, Canachus crocodilus possesses small, vestigial wings on the anterior margin of the metanotum, which are clearly visible as white scales. Also characteristic of the genus are the lobes tapering to a point-formed by the otherwise disc-shaped metasternum, located near the hind coxae. The species exhibits comparatively high-contrast coloration. Although the dorsal side of the female is colored entirely in shades of brown, except for the black tip of the abdomen and the similarly colored ovipositor, the underside also features contrasting markings. Its ground color ranges from beige to yellow, with gray markings on the thoracic sternites. Most striking are the black edges along the anterior margins of the abdominal segments and at the junctions between the thoracic sternites. Males also display high-contrast markings on their dorsal side. A yellowish line runs from the pronotum almost to the tip of the abdomen. The lateral edges in this area are also light-colored, while the intervening regions are blackish-brown anteriorly, transitioning to a medium brown toward the end of the abdomen. The antennae are covered with short hairs in both sexes. Two very small, blunt tubercles are located on the head between the eyes, with two or three larger tubercles situated further back on each side in obliquely arranged longitudinal rows. The pronotum exhibits two distinct but small tubercles on the anterior margin and a hump or tooth on the posterior lateral margin. The mesothorax is slightly longer than the metathorax. The mesonotum is narrower anteriorly than posteriorly and bears two or three small tubercles on its lateral margins. Its anterior margin is slightly raised and indistinctly bituberculate. A small tubercle is located on the upper margin of the mesopleura, with three or four others on the lower margin. The metapleura widen slightly towards the rear and bear three tubercles each on the upper and lower margins. Unlike Canachus tyrrhaeus and Canachus harpyia, the anterior abdominal segments, including the median segment, do not exhibit paired spines or humps. The male abdomen is much narrower than the metathorax. The anal segment (the ninth dorsal segment or tergite) is moderately narrow, truncate, and flattened into a keel-like shape posteriorly. The inner lobe is armed with a black tooth. The female's anal segment is keeled, slightly tapered, and pointed. It is overhung by the very long, dorsally situated supra-anal plate (epiproct). Together, they form the long ovipositor characteristic of the genus. The cerci are short, barely protruding, and bluntly lanceolate. The femora of all six legs are partially covered with spine-like tubercles dorsally and bear spines along the ventral midline. They also feature a small lateral tooth just before the apex. The males' hind legs are greatly thickened and feature, on the underside along the midline, a black lateral tooth and four to five large spines, with the spines increasing in size towards the tip. The front four tibiae are finely toothed on the underside along the midline and along the posterior margin. The males' hind legs are conspicuously curved, tuberculate on the upper side, and armed with a few small teeth at the tip on the underside. In females, the hind legs are nearly straight and toothed along the entire length of the underside.

== Occurrence ==
The species originates from New Caledonia. The only precise locality known is that of the breeding strain kept in hobbyist terrariums. This strain was collected at Koniambo, near the commune Voh on the west coast of New Caledonia's North Province.

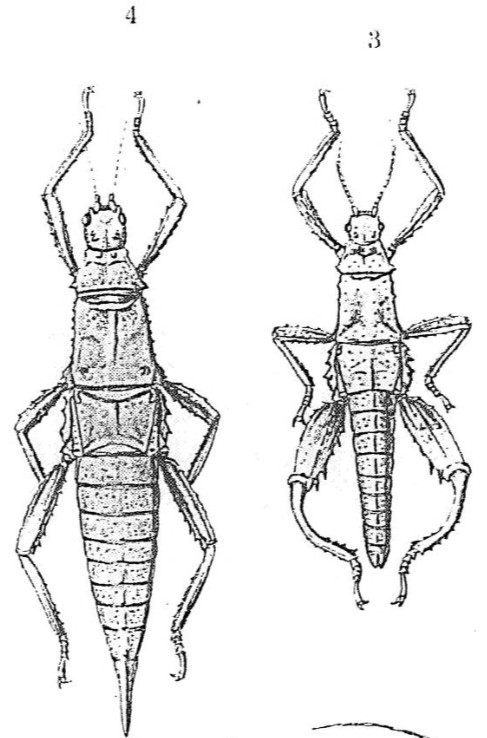
Illustration from Redtenbacher 1908

== Taxonomy ==
In 1875, Carl Stål established the genus Canachus for the species Canachus crocodilus and Canachus salamandra. Stål described Canachus crocodilus based on a single male and a single female from the collection of Carl Brunner von Wattenwyl. This collection is now housed at the Natural History Museum, Vienna, where both specimens are currently located. As no holotype has been designated, they are considered equivalent syntypes of the species. The specific epithet "crocodilus" is not explained but likely refers to the overall shape of the females, with their elongated ovipositor, their outline resembles that of a crocodile. In 1908, Josef Redtenbacher worked on the genus Canachus, among many other stick insects. He described three additional Canachus species, one of them has been transferred to the genus Paracanachus in 1915. Additionally, he transferred a species previously assigned to the genus Eurycantha into the genus Canachus and published the only identification key to date for distinguishing all six species. According to him, the pair of Canachus crocodilus that he examined and illustrated originated from the Natural History Museum, Paris. As early as 1904, William Forsell Kirby had designated Canachus crocodilus as the type species of the genus and placed it, along with the two other previously described species, into what was then the subfamily Eurycantinae. Although the genus is still classified within the tribe Eurycanthini, molecular genetic studies indicate that it is only distantly related to members of the genus Eurycantha. It is much more closely related to other species of the so-called Lancerocerata. This group, in turn, comprises a clade of species from Madagascar and two large clades from the Australasian region. Canachus is found within one of the Australasian clades, its closest relatives include the monotypic genus Microcanachus as well as the genus Asprenas, which consists entirely of long-legged, stick-like species.

== In terraristics ==
After Canachus alligator, Canachus crocodilus is the second species of the genus to enter the terrariums of European hobbyists. It has been kept and bred in captivity since around 2024. The species is easier to breed than Canachus alligator and can be readily fed on the foliage of a wide variety of plants, such as different Rubus species like bramble or hazel and salal (Gaultheria shallon). Based on its location of origin, the captive strain is generally referred to as Canachus crocodilus 'New Caledonia' or more precisely as Canachus crocodilus 'Koniambo'.

== Gallery ==
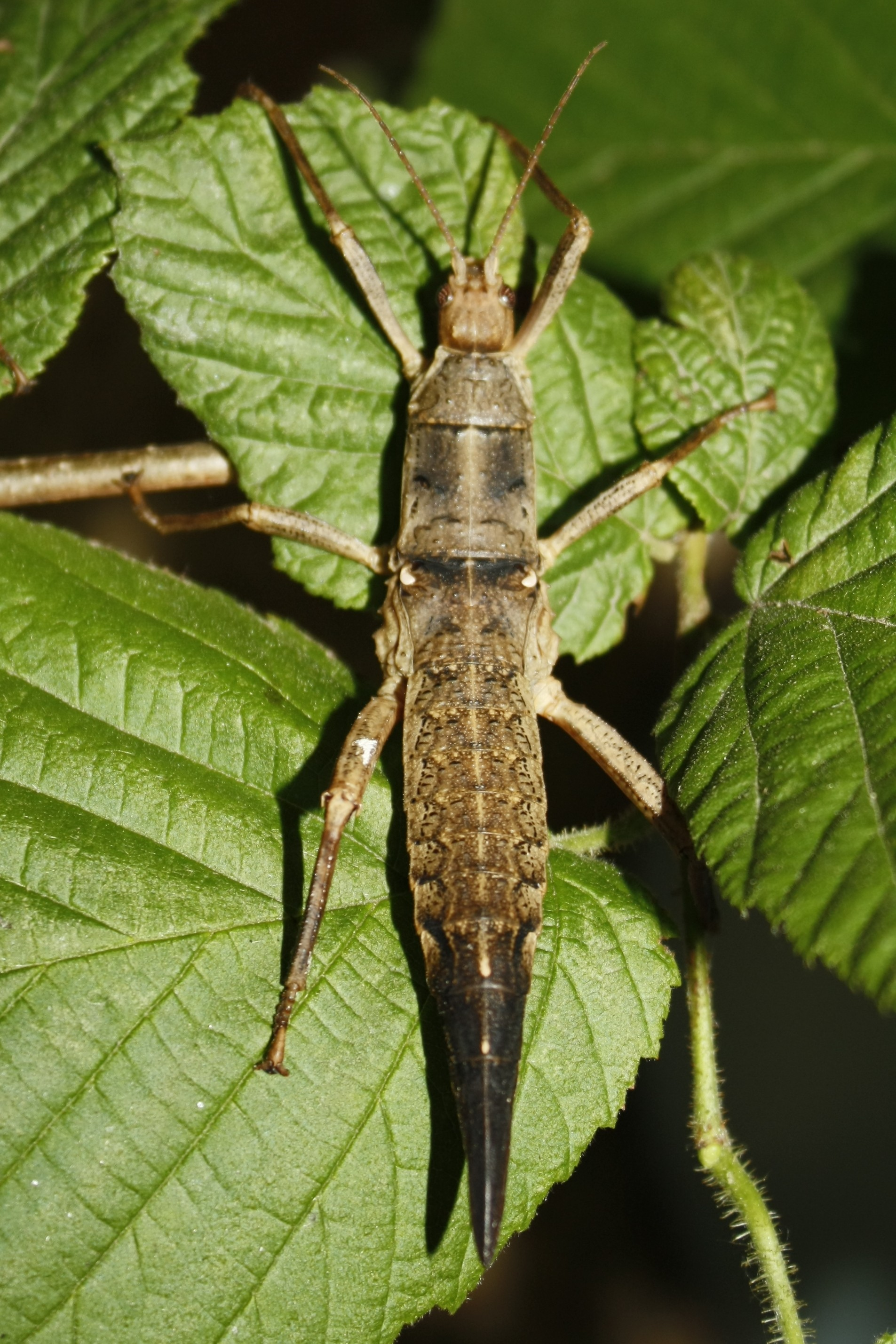
Female

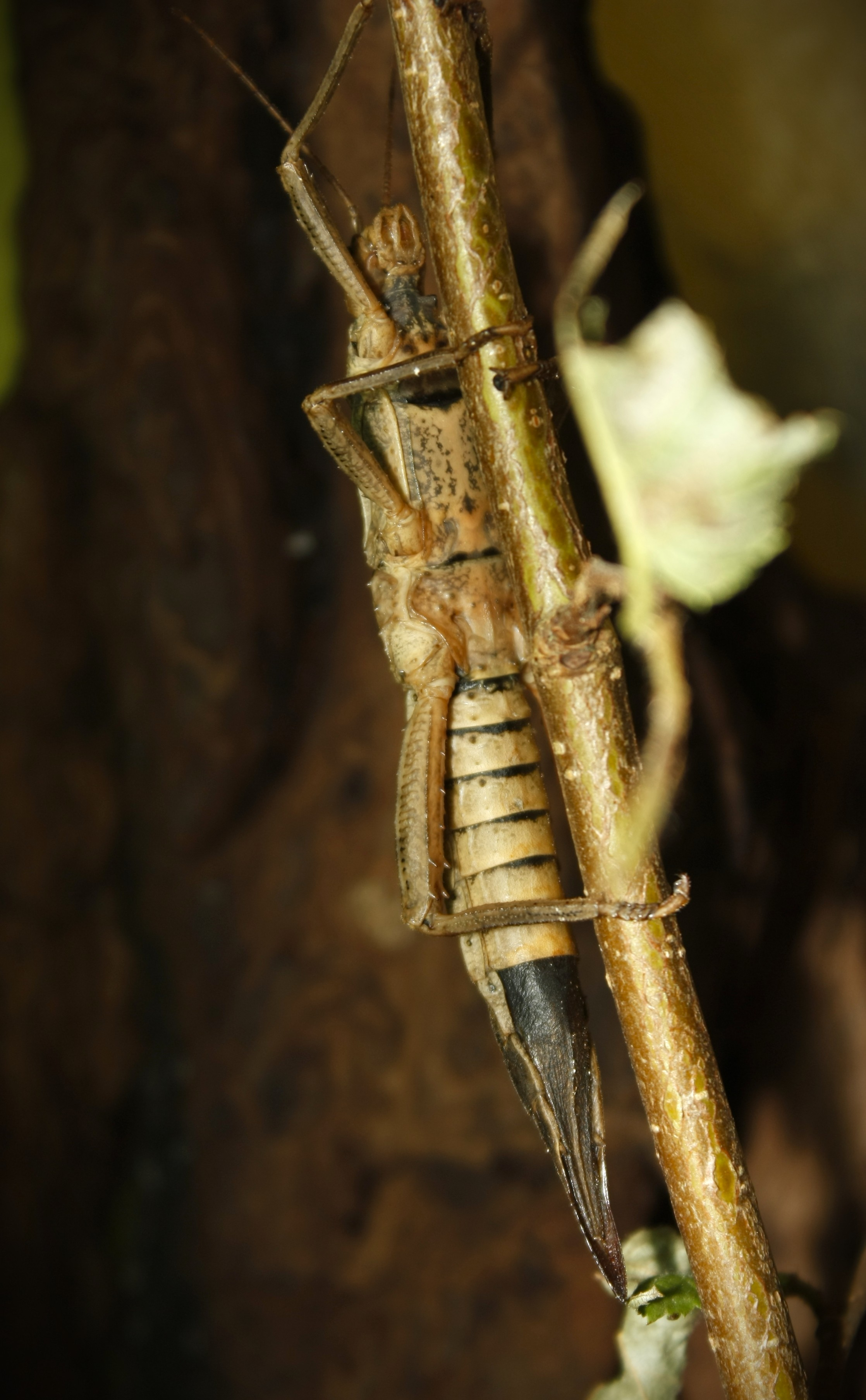
Female from below

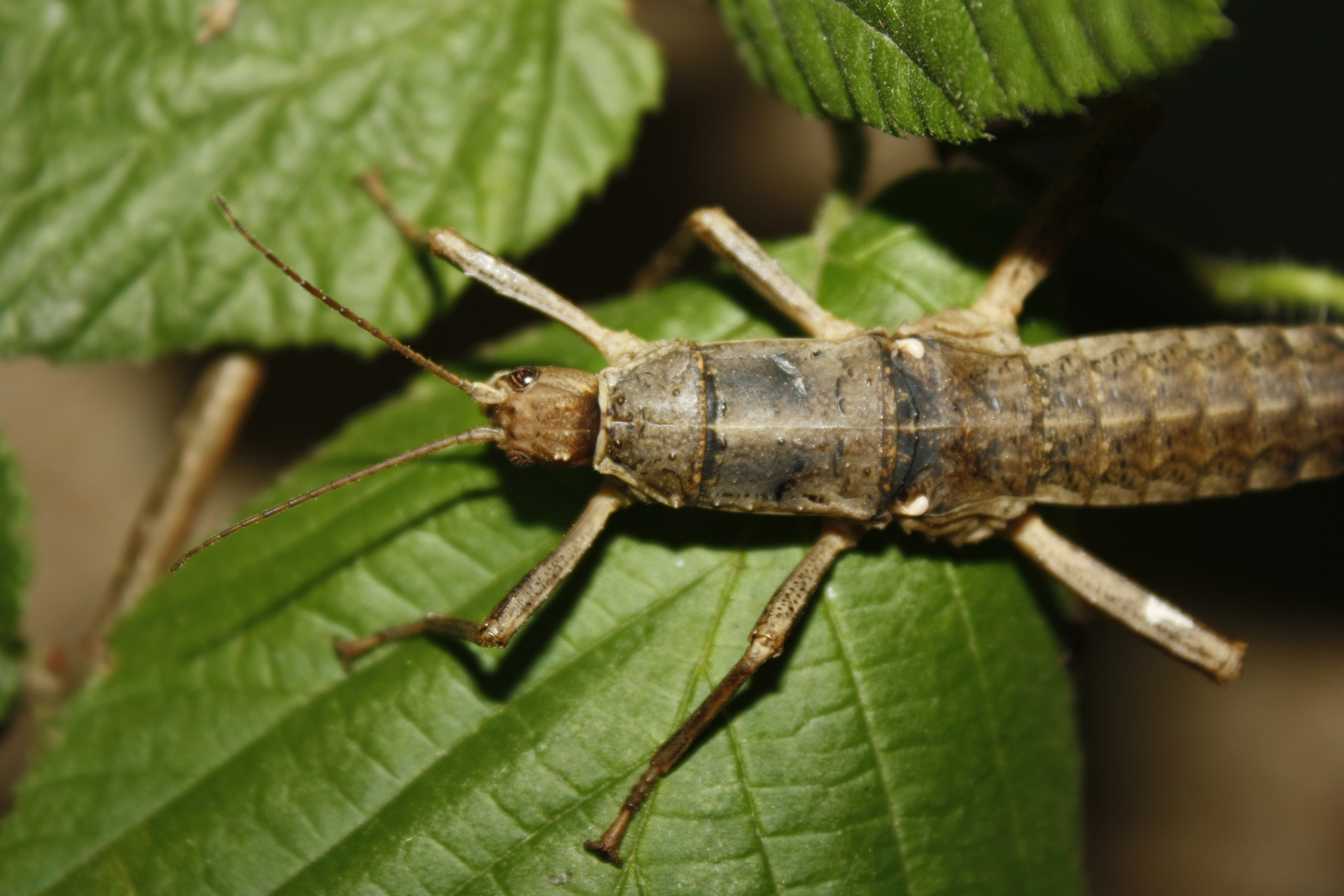
Female

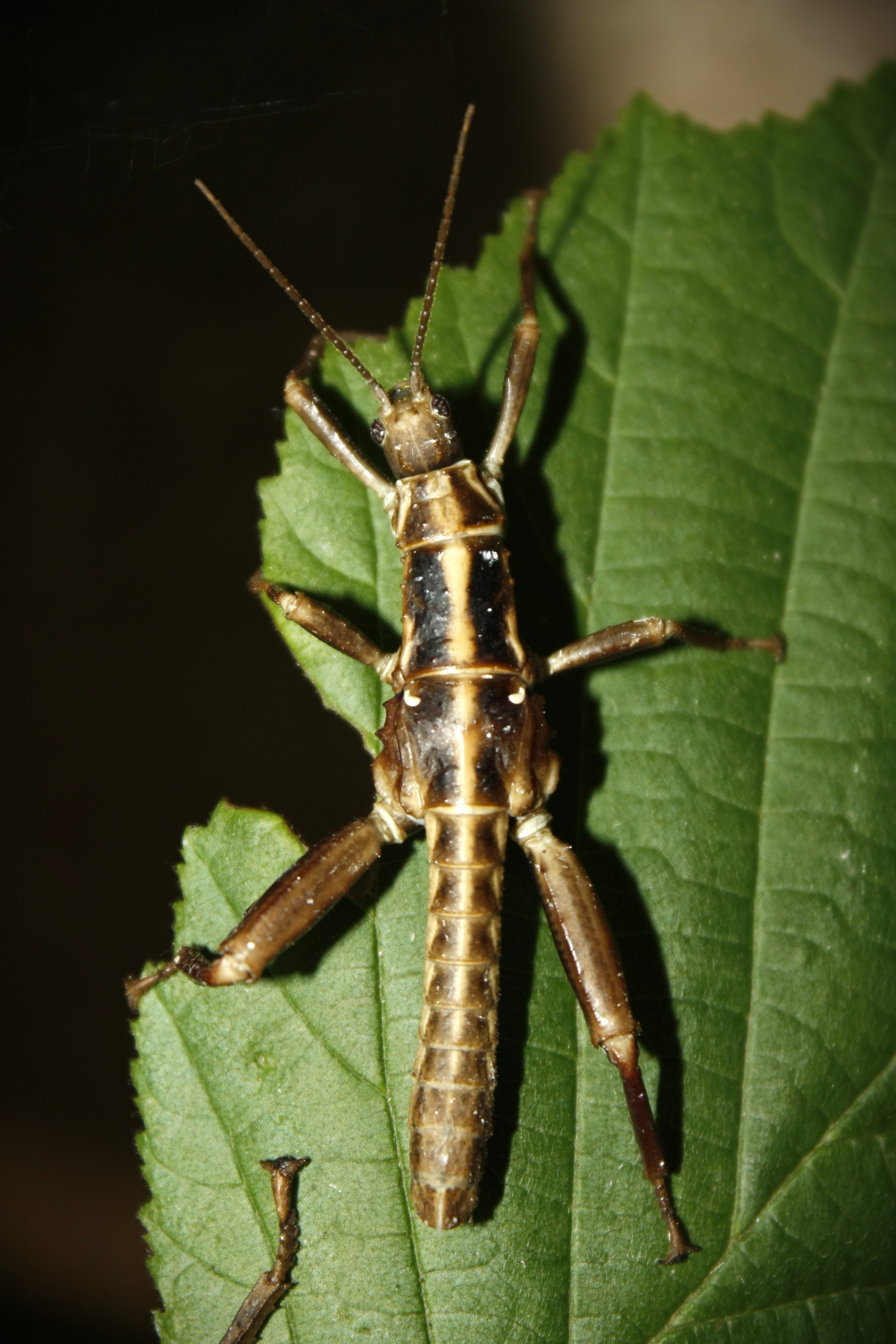
Male

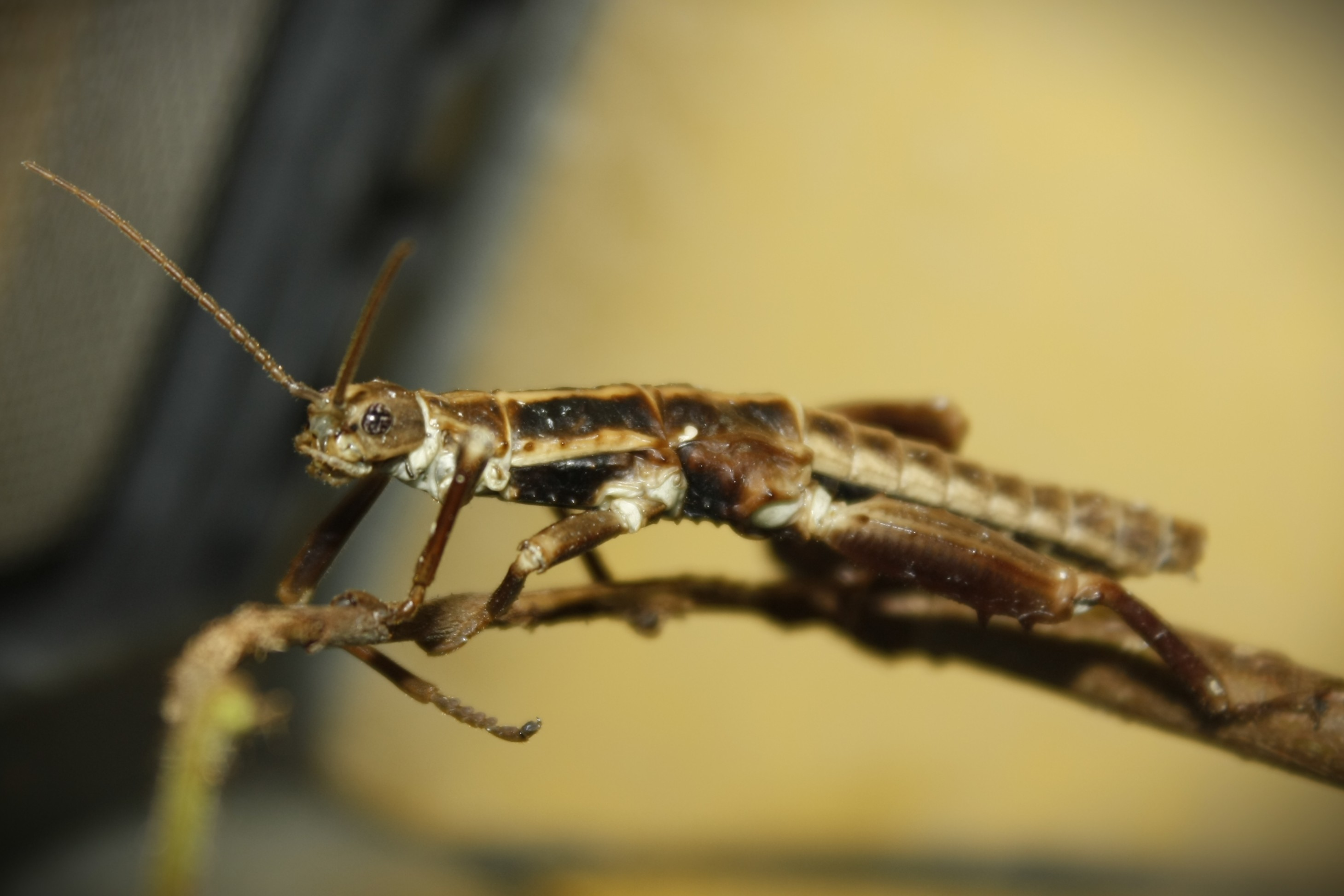
Male in side view
