= Corazonin =

Neuropeptide of insects

Identifiers
CAS Number	122984-73-0
3D model (JSmol)	Interactive image
ChemSpider	28296137
PubChem CID	25082621
- InChI: InChI=1S/C62H84N18O18/c1-30(82)50(60(97)75-41(52(65)89)26-47(64)86)80-58(95)44(25-34-27-69-37-12-7-6-11-36(34)37)72-49(88)28-70-53(90)38(13-8-22-68-62(66)67)73-59(96)45(29-81)78-57(94)42(24-33-14-16-35(84)17-15-33)76-54(91)40(18-20-46(63)85)74-56(93)43(23-32-9-4-3-5-10-32)77-61(98)51(31(2)83)79-55(92)39-19-21-48(87)71-39/h3-7,9-12,14-17,27,30-31,38-45,50-51,69,81-84H,8,13,18-26,28-29H2,1-2H3,(H2,63,85)(H2,64,86)(H2,65,89)(H,70,90)(H,71,87)(H,72,88)(H,73,96)(H,74,93)(H,75,97)(H,76,91)(H,77,98)(H,78,94)(H,79,92)(H,80,95)(H4,66,67,68) Key: UOABGUNWRLWTJU-UHFFFAOYSA-N
- SMILES: CC(C(C(=O)NC(CC1=CC=CC=C1)C(=O)NC(CCC(=O)N)C(=O)NC(CC2=CC=C(C=C2)O)C(=O)NC(CO)C(=O)NC(CCCN=C(N)N)C(=O)NCC(=O)NC(CC3=CNC4=CC=CC=C43)C(=O)NC(C(C)O)C(=O)NC(CC(=O)N)C(=O)N)NC(=O)C5CCC(=O)N5)O

Properties
Chemical formula	C_{62}H_{84}N_{18}O_{18}
Molar mass	1369.462 g·mol^{−1}
- Except where otherwise noted, data are given for materials in their standard state (at 25 °C [77 °F], 100 kPa). Infobox references

Corazonin is a highly conserved neuropeptide found in many insects, in particular locusts and cockroaches.

== Structure ==
Corazonin is an undecapeptide (11 amino-acid peptide) with the amino acid sequence carboxyl-Glu-Thr-Phe-Gln-Tyr-Ser-Arg-Gly-Trp-Thr-Asn-amine. It is blocked by pGlu at its N-terminal side and amidated at its C-terminus. This form is called [Arg(7)]-corazonin. Other forms include [His(7)]-corazonin, [Thr(4), His(7)]-corazonin and [Tyr(3), Gln(7), Gln(10)]-corazonin.

== History ==
Corazonin was first identified as a cardiostimulatory neuropeptide in the American cockroach (Periplaneta americana). Due to its ability to accelerate the heart beat in P. americana it was named corazonin, from 'corazón', the Spanish word for 'heart'. It was then shown to be present also in the moth Manduca sexta, another cockroach species, Nauphoeta cinerea as well as the locust Schistocerca gregaria. In the latter species the Arg residue was replaced by a His residue. Several years later the peptide was independently identified from locusts, where it was initially named 'dark-color-inducing neurohormone' or 'dark pigmentotropin' due to its ability to induce dark pigmentation in some insects.

== Where corazonin is found ==
[Arg(7)]-corazonin was originally identified in cockroaches such as the American cockroach (Periplaneta americana) and has also been identified in the genus of flies Drosophila, the cricket Gryllus bimaculatus and the silkworm Bombyx mori and is now known to be the most common form of this peptide. [His(7)]-corazonin is found in certain locusts, including the migratory locust (Locusta migratoria) and the desert locust (Schistocerca gregaria), the stick insect Carausius morosus, and in wasps (Vespidae). [Thr(4), His(7)]-corazonin appears only to be found in bees, such as the honey bee (Apis mellifera). [Tyr(3), Gln(7), Gln(10)]-corazonin is present in wasps. Corazonin appears to be lacking in all beetle species as well as aphids. [Arg(7)]-corazonin has also been identified from the tick Ixodes scapularis, but is absent from the spider mite. It may thus well be generally present in Arthropods.

== Function ==
The peptide is typically produced by large neuroendocrine cells in the pars lateralis of the protocerebrum that have axons into the corpora cardiaca where it is released into the hemolymph. In this respect the neuropeptide resembles its vertebrate homolog, GnRH (Gonadotropin Releasing Hormone) which is released into the pituitary gland to stimulate the release of Luteinizing hormone and Follicle Stimulating Hormone in vertebrates, like humans. Corazonin and GnRH are clear homologs, as are their receptors.

In the common fruit fly Drosophila melanogaster, corazonin is expressed in the salivary glands and fat body of both males and females, and is also expressed sexually dimorphically in the abdominal ganglia of males. It acts in part as a stress peptide through regulation of food intake and metabolism and in males specifically, it both enables sperm transfer and sets copulation duration.

In the American cockroach Periplaneta americana, [Arg(7)]-corazonin acts as a cardiostimulatory neuropeptide and accelerates the heart beat. It also causes contractions of the hyperneural muscle, however this has not been seen in other cockroach species.

[His(7)]-corazonin acts as a hormonal factor in locusts and can cause dark pigmentation in albino migratory locusts (Locusta migratoria) and in green nymphs of the desert locust Schistocerca gregaria. While corazonins found in crickets and moths have no effect on body colour of the crickets or moths themselves, they can cause dark pigmentation in albino nymphs of the migratory locust (Locusta migratoria).

In silkworms (Bombyx mori), corazonin reduces the spinning rate of silk.
