= Carausius scotti =

Conservation status
- Critically Endangered (IUCN 3.1)

Scientific classification
- Domain: Eukaryota
- Kingdom: Animalia
- Phylum: Arthropoda
- Class: Insecta
- Order: Phasmatodea
- Family: Lonchodidae
- Genus: Carausius
- Species: C. scotti

Binomial name
- Carausius scotti Bolivar & Ferriere, 1912

Species of insect

Carausius scotti, or Scott's stick insect, is an insect species endemic to Silhouette Island in the Seychelles. It was assessed as critically endangered in The IUCN Red List of Threatened Species in 2007 as a restricted range species with an area of occupancy of 10 square kilometres (3.9 sq mi) with an estimated extent of occurrence (EOO) of 18 square kilometres (6.9 sq mi). The species is primarily threatened with declining woodland habitats due to invasive plants (especially Cinnamomum verum) and also climactic factors such as droughts. It is present in the protected area of Silhouette National Park as a part of conservation efforts, however more conservation actions are needed, as well as further research to determine population sizes and trends.
