= Chrosiothes taiwan =

Scientific classification
- Kingdom: Animalia
- Phylum: Arthropoda
- Subphylum: Chelicerata
- Class: Arachnida
- Order: Araneae
- Infraorder: Araneomorphae
- Family: Theridiidae
- Genus: Chrosiothes
- Species: C. taiwan

Binomial name
- Chrosiothes taiwan Yoshida, Tso & Severinghaus, 2000
- Chrosiothes taiwan is known from Orchid Island, Taiwan

Species of spider

Chrosiothes taiwan is a species of comb-footed spider in the family Theridiidae. It is endemic to Taiwan. The type series – two males – was collected from Orchid Island.

Male Chrosiothes taiwan measure 1.97–2.03 mm (0.1–0.1 in) in total length. Basal color is brown. The eyes are on dark bases. The abdomen is grayish brown with dorsal black flecks. Females are unknown.
