= Chrosiothes goodnightorum =

Scientific classification
- Domain: Eukaryota
- Kingdom: Animalia
- Phylum: Arthropoda
- Subphylum: Chelicerata
- Class: Arachnida
- Order: Araneae
- Infraorder: Araneomorphae
- Family: Theridiidae
- Genus: Chrosiothes
- Species: C. goodnightorum

Binomial name
- Chrosiothes goodnightorum (Levi, 1954)

Species of spider

Chrosiothes goodnightorum is a species of comb-footed spider in the family Theridiidae. It is found in Central America.
