= Chrosiothes venturosus =

Scientific classification
- Domain: Eukaryota
- Kingdom: Animalia
- Phylum: Arthropoda
- Subphylum: Chelicerata
- Class: Arachnida
- Order: Araneae
- Infraorder: Araneomorphae
- Family: Theridiidae
- Genus: Chrosiothes
- Species: C. venturosus

Binomial name
- Chrosiothes venturosus Marques & Buckup, 1997

Species of spider

Chrosiothes venturosus is a species of comb-footed spider in the family Theridiidae. It is found in Brazil.
