= Chrosiothes cicuta =

Scientific classification
- Kingdom: Animalia
- Phylum: Arthropoda
- Subphylum: Chelicerata
- Class: Arachnida
- Order: Araneae
- Infraorder: Araneomorphae
- Family: Theridiidae
- Genus: Chrosiothes
- Species: C. cicuta

Binomial name
- Chrosiothes cicuta Puchulú-Figueiredo, Santanna & Rodrigues, 2017

Species of spider

Chrosiothes cicuta is a species of comb-footed spider in the family Theridiidae. It is found in Brazil.
