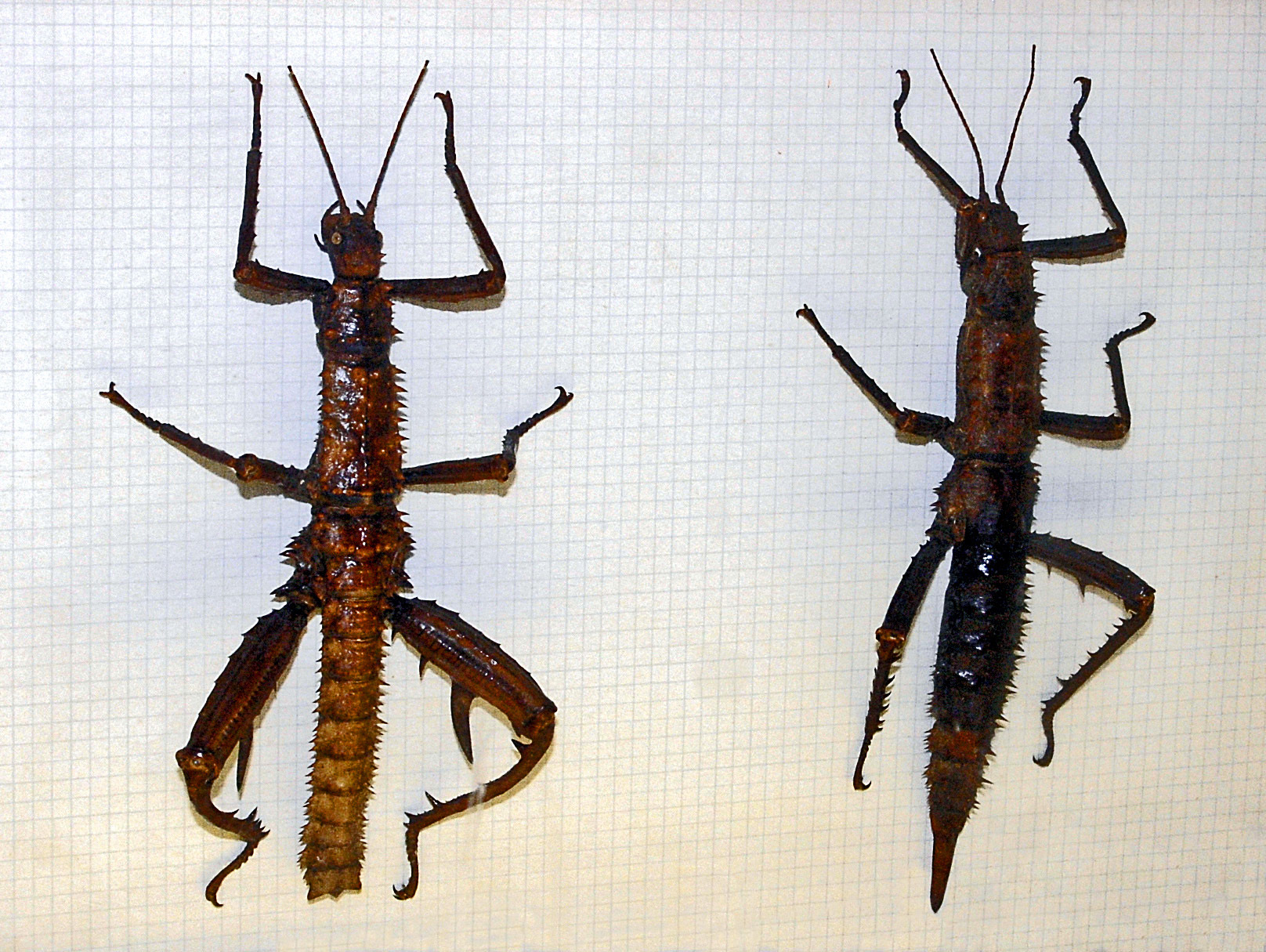
- Eurycantha horrida, male and female. Museum specimen

Scientific classification
- Kingdom: Animalia
- Phylum: Arthropoda
- Clade: Pancrustacea
- Class: Insecta
- Order: Phasmatodea
- Family: Lonchodidae
- Subfamily: Lonchodinae
- Tribe: Eurycanthini
- Genus: Eurycantha
- Species: E. horrida

Binomial name
- Eurycantha horrida Boisduval, 1835

= Eurycantha horrida =

Species of stick insect

Eurycantha horrida, the thorny devil walking stick, is a species belonging to the stick insects (order Phasmatodea) and to the family Phasmatidae.

== Description ==
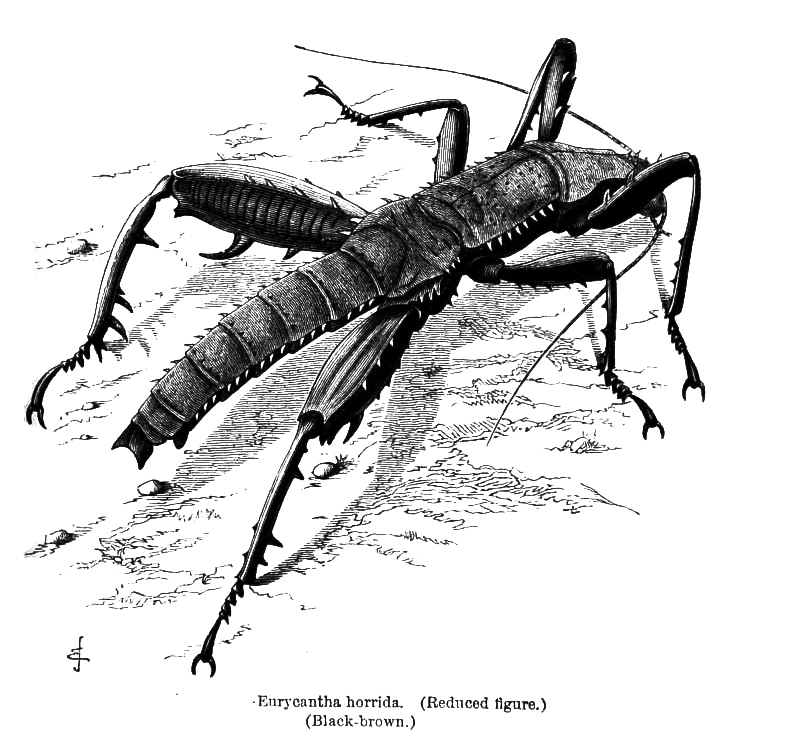

Eurycantha horrida can reach a length of about 12 centimetres (4.7 in) in males, of about 14 centimetres (5.5 in) in females. The body color ranges from pale green to brown. The young insects are glossy greenish. These ground-dwelling stick insects resemble bark or rotten wood. They have numerous small spines on their body and on their hind legs. Both sexes are wingless and look very similar. They exhibit the sexual dimorphism of many phasmids, as the males are darker, smaller and thinner and have enlarged hind leg femurs with a curved spine or thorn on the underneath side. Females are also brighter than the males and have a larger abdomen tipped with a beak-shaped ovipositor with which they lay the eggs in damp soil.

== Behaviour ==
Males of the species have a large spine on their forelegs, which is used during mating to ward off other males from their mate.

== Distribution and habitat ==
This species occurs in Papua New Guinea. It can be found in tropical rainforests in trees, shrubs and ground litter.

== Life cycle ==
The eggs hatch after about 4 months. Young insects mature after about 5–6 molts in 4 to 6 months. Life expectancy from hatching to death is of about 2 years. They are nocturnal and they feed on a wide range of plants, mainly on leaves of Rosaceae species (blackberry, raspberry, wild rose, hawthorn, cherry, cotoneaster, etc.) but also on leaves of oak, beech, hazel, chestnut, eucalyptus, etc.
