= Mnesilochus =

Scientific classification
- Kingdom: Animalia
- Phylum: Arthropoda
- Clade: Pancrustacea
- Class: Insecta
- Order: Phasmatodea
- Family: Lonchodidae
- Subfamily: Lonchodinae
- Genus: Mnesilochus; Stål, 1877

Genus of stick insects

Mnesilochus is a genus of stick insects in the subfamily Lonchodinae. Species have a known distribution in: Borneo, Philippines, Sumatra.

== Species ==
The Phasmida Species File lists:

- Mnesilochus bushelli (Bragg, 2005)
- Mnesilochus capreolus Stål, 1877
- Mnesilochus haedulus Stål, 1877
- Mnesilochus jenswilhelmjanzeni (Zompro, 2007)
- Mnesilochus mindanaense (Brunner von Wattenwyl, 1907)
- Mnesilochus palawanicus (Carl, 1913)
- Mnesilochus portentosus (Brunner von Wattenwyl, 1907)
- Mnesilochus rusticus (Brunner von Wattenwyl, 1907)
- Mnesilochus verrucosus (Haan, 1842)
