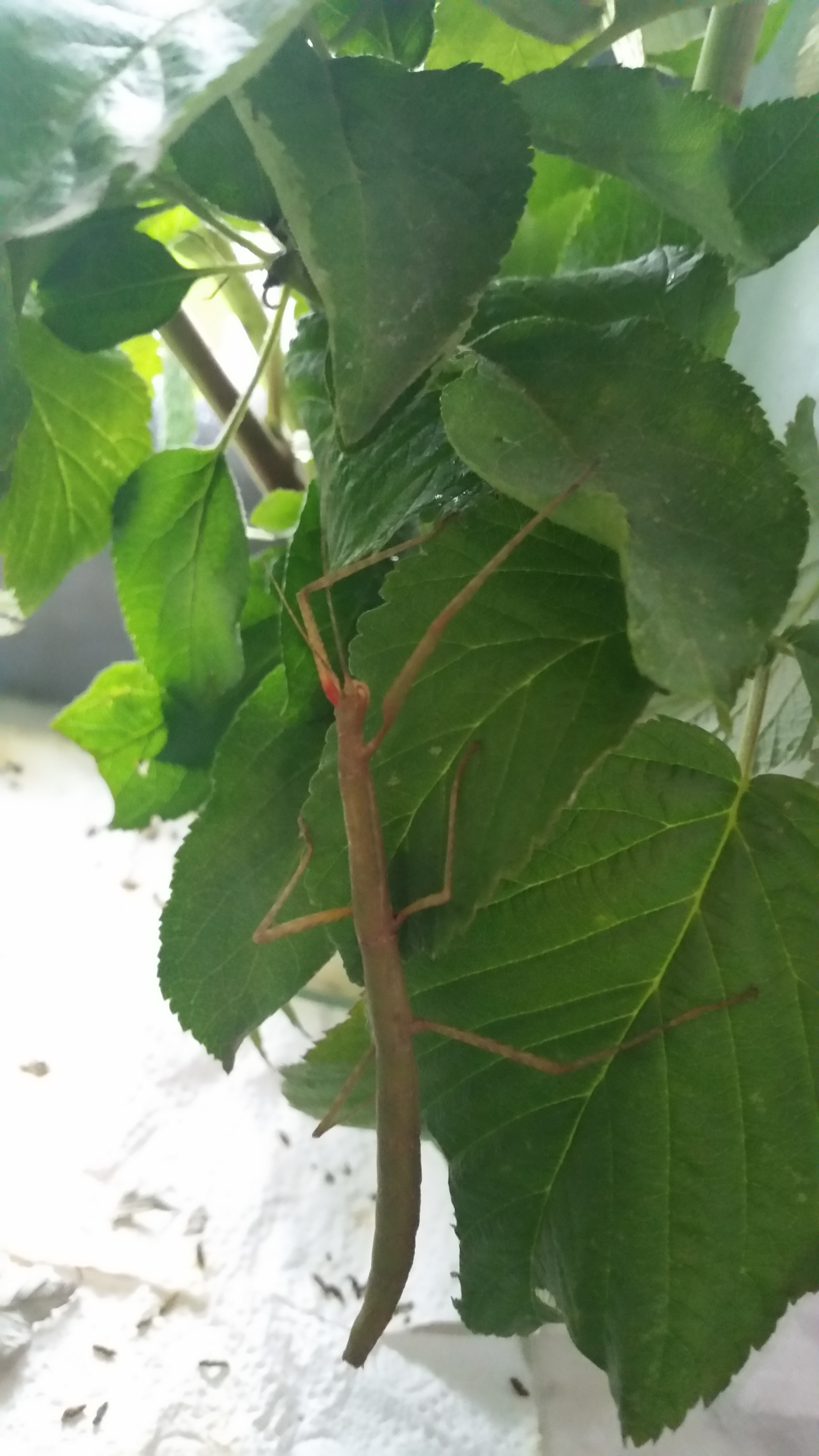
- Carausius morosus from India

Scientific classification
- Kingdom: Animalia
- Phylum: Arthropoda
- Clade: Pancrustacea
- Class: Insecta
- Order: Phasmatodea
- Family: Lonchodidae
- Subfamily: Lonchodinae
- Genus: Carausius; Stål, 1875

Species
- Many; see text

Synonyms
- Dixippus Stål, 1875

= Carausius (insect) =

Genus of insects

Carausius is a genus of the tribe Lonchodini, in the order Phasmatodea (stick and leaf insects). The genus is in many ways typical of the Phasmatodea in that all species are twig-like in appearance. These species are parthenogenetic.

Carausius morosus is the most commonly kept stick insect in captivity.

== Species ==
The Phasmida Species File lists:

1. Carausius abdominalis (Brunner von Wattenwyl, 1907)
2. Carausius alluaudi (Bolívar [Y Urrutia], 1895)
3. Carausius baumei Karny, 1910
4. Carausius bicornis Ho, 2017 - Vietnam
5. Carausius bolivari (Brunner von Wattenwyl, 1907)
6. Carausius bracatus Rehn, 1904
7. Carausius burri Brunner von Wattenwyl, 1907
8. Carausius crawangensis (de Haan, 1842)
9. Carausius cristatus Brunner von Wattenwyl, 1907
10. Carausius debilis Brunner von Wattenwyl, 1907
11. Carausius detractus Brunner von Wattenwyl, 1907
12. Carausius emeiensis Chen & He, 2008
13. Carausius erniwatiae Seow-Choen, 2020
14. Carausius exsul Werner, 1930
15. Carausius femoralis Chen & He, 2002
16. Carausius fruhstorferi (Carl, 1913)
17. Carausius furcillatus Pantel, 1917
18. Carausius gardineri Bolívar [Y Urrutia], 1912
19. Carausius gracilicercus Ho, 2021
20. Carausius gracilicornis Ho, 2021
21. Carausius granulatus Brunner von Wattenwyl, 1893
22. Carausius guizhouensis Ho, 2021
23. Carausius hilaris Brunner von Wattenwyl, 1907
24. Carausius huanglianshanensis Ho, 2017
25. Carausius imbellis Brunner von Wattenwyl, 1907
26. Carausius insolens Brunner von Wattenwyl, 1907
27. Carausius irregulariterlobatus Brunner von Wattenwyl, 1907
28. Carausius juvenilis Brunner von Wattenwyl, 1907
29. Carausius lijiangensis Chen & He, 2002
30. Carausius lobulatipes Pantel, 1917
31. Carausius luchunensis Ho, 2017
32. Carausius mancus Brunner von Wattenwyl, 1907
33. Carausius minutus Brunner von Wattenwyl, 1907
34. Carausius morosus Brunner von Wattenwyl, 1907
35. Carausius nodosus (de Haan, 1842)
36. Carausius novus Ho, 2017
37. Carausius patruclis Brunner von Wattenwyl, 1907
38. Carausius primiglobosus Seow-Choen, 2021
39. Carausius proximus Carl, 1913
40. Carausius pustulosus Pantel, 1917
41. Carausius rotundatolobatus Brunner von Wattenwyl, 1907
42. Carausius rubrogranulatus Ho, 2021
43. Carausius rudissimus Brunner von Wattenwyl, 1907
44. Carausius rugosus Brunner von Wattenwyl, 1907 - Vietnam
45. Carausius scotti Ferrière, 1912
46. Carausius sechellensis (Bolívar [Y Urrutia], 1895)
47. Carausius sikkimensis (Brunner von Wattenwyl, 1907)
48. Carausius simplex Brunner von Wattenwyl, 1907
49. Carausius spinosus Brunner von Wattenwyl, 1907
50. Carausius strumosus Stål, 1875 - type species (Java)
51. Carausius tanahrataensis Seow-Choen, 2000
52. Carausius tetsengi Seow-Choen, 2021
53. Carausius theiseni Cappe de Baillon, Favrelle & Vichêt, 1934
54. Carausius transiliens Brunner von Wattenwyl, 1907
55. Carausius undatus Chen & He, 2002
56. Carausius vacillans Brunner von Wattenwyl, 1907
57. Carausius virgo Brunner von Wattenwyl, 1907
58. Carausius yingjiangensis Ho, 2017
59. Carausius yunnanensis Ho, 2017

Note: possibly nomen nudum:

- Carausius siamensis Thanasinchayakul, 2006
- Carausius thailandi Thanasinchayakul, 2006
