= Chrosiothes fulvus =

Scientific classification
- Kingdom: Animalia
- Phylum: Arthropoda
- Subphylum: Chelicerata
- Class: Arachnida
- Order: Araneae
- Infraorder: Araneomorphae
- Family: Theridiidae
- Genus: Chrosiothes
- Species: C. fulvus

Binomial name
- Chrosiothes fulvus Yoshida, Tso & Severinghaus, 2000
- Chrosiothes fulvus is known from Orchid Island, Taiwan

Species of spider

Chrosiothes fulvus is a species of comb-footed spider in the family Theridiidae. It is endemic to Taiwan. The type series was collected from Orchid Island.

Male Chrosiothes fulvus measure 1.76–2.05 mm (0.1–0.1 in) and female 2.34–2.42 mm (0.1–0.1 in) in total length. Basal color is light brown. The eyes region has dusky flecks. The abdomen is light brown with brown sclerotized part.
