= Chrosiothes episinoides =

Scientific classification
- Kingdom: Animalia
- Phylum: Arthropoda
- Subphylum: Chelicerata
- Class: Arachnida
- Order: Araneae
- Infraorder: Araneomorphae
- Family: Theridiidae
- Genus: Chrosiothes
- Species: C. episinoides

Binomial name
- Chrosiothes episinoides (Levi, 1963)

Species of spider

Chrosiothes episinoides is a species of comb-footed spider in the family Theridiidae. It is found in Chile.
