= Chrosiothes jenningsi =

Conservation status
- Critically Imperiled (NatureServe)

Scientific classification
- Kingdom: Animalia
- Phylum: Arthropoda
- Subphylum: Chelicerata
- Class: Arachnida
- Order: Araneae
- Infraorder: Araneomorphae
- Family: Theridiidae
- Genus: Chrosiothes
- Species: C. jenningsi

Binomial name
- Chrosiothes jenningsi Piel, 1995

Species of spider

Chrosiothes jenningsi is a species of cobweb spider in the family Theridiidae. It is found in the United States.
