= Chrosiothes jocosus =

Scientific classification
- Domain: Eukaryota
- Kingdom: Animalia
- Phylum: Arthropoda
- Subphylum: Chelicerata
- Class: Arachnida
- Order: Araneae
- Infraorder: Araneomorphae
- Family: Theridiidae
- Genus: Chrosiothes
- Species: C. jocosus

Binomial name
- Chrosiothes jocosus (Gertsch & Davis, 1936)

Species of spider

Chrosiothes jocosus is a species of cobweb spider in the family Theridiidae. It is found in the United States and Mexico.
