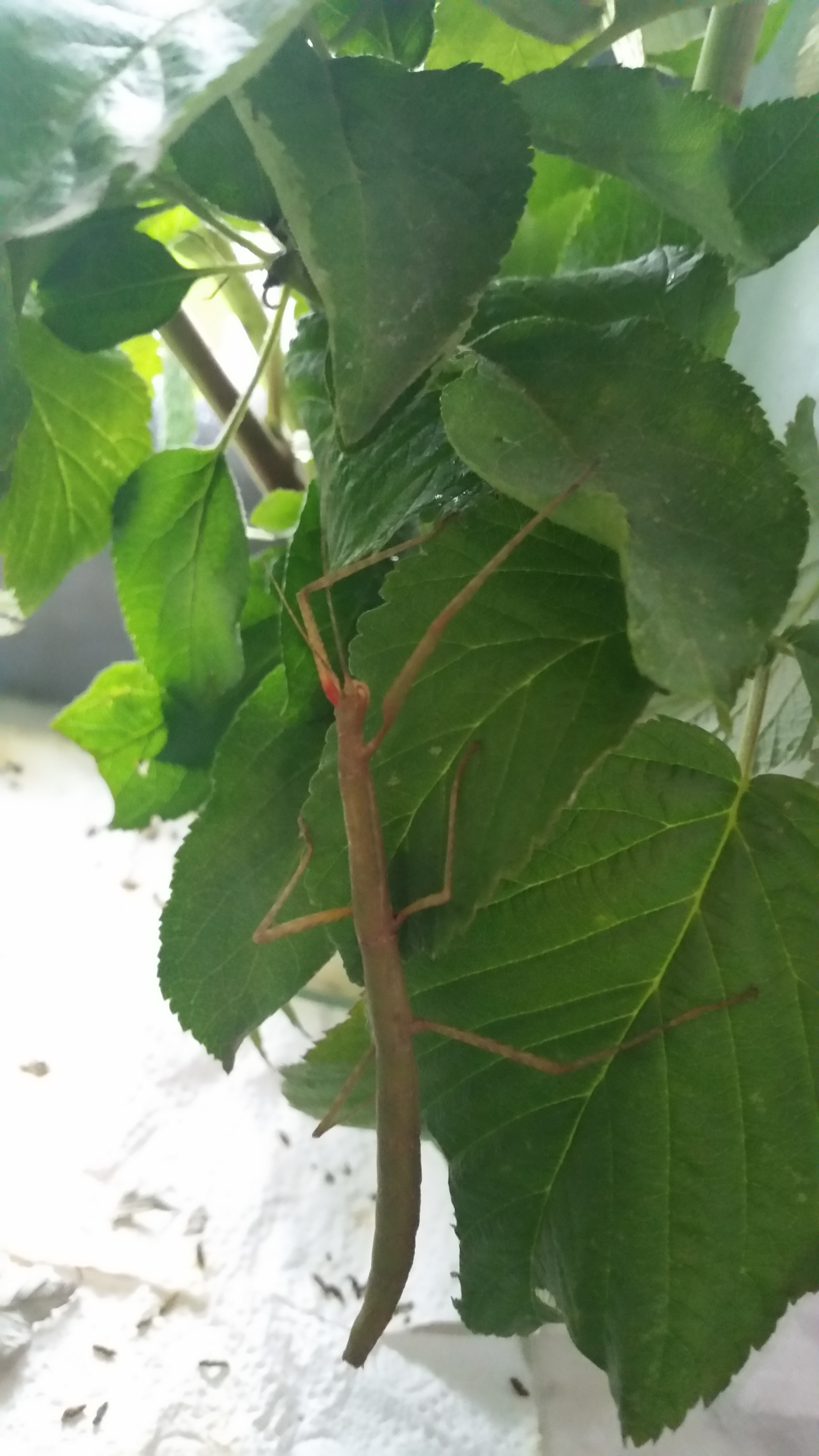
- Carausius morosus

Scientific classification
- Kingdom: Animalia
- Phylum: Arthropoda
- Clade: Pancrustacea
- Class: Insecta
- Order: Phasmatodea
- Infraorder: Anareolatae
- Family: Lonchodidae
- Subfamily: Lonchodinae
- Genus: Carausius
- Species: C. morosus

Binomial name
- Carausius morosus Sinéty, 1901

Synonyms
- Dixippus morosus Sinéty, 1901

= Carausius morosus =

Species of insect

Carausius morosus (the 'common', 'Indian' or 'laboratory' stick insect) is a species of Phasmatodea (phasmid) often kept as pets. Culture stocks originate from a collection from Tamil Nadu, India. Like the majority of the Phasmatodea, C. morosus are nocturnal. Culture stocks are parthenogenetic females that can reproduce without mating. Only 1 in 1000 are male, and although in captivity, gynandromorphs (individuals with both female and male characteristics) are sometimes reared.

== Description ==
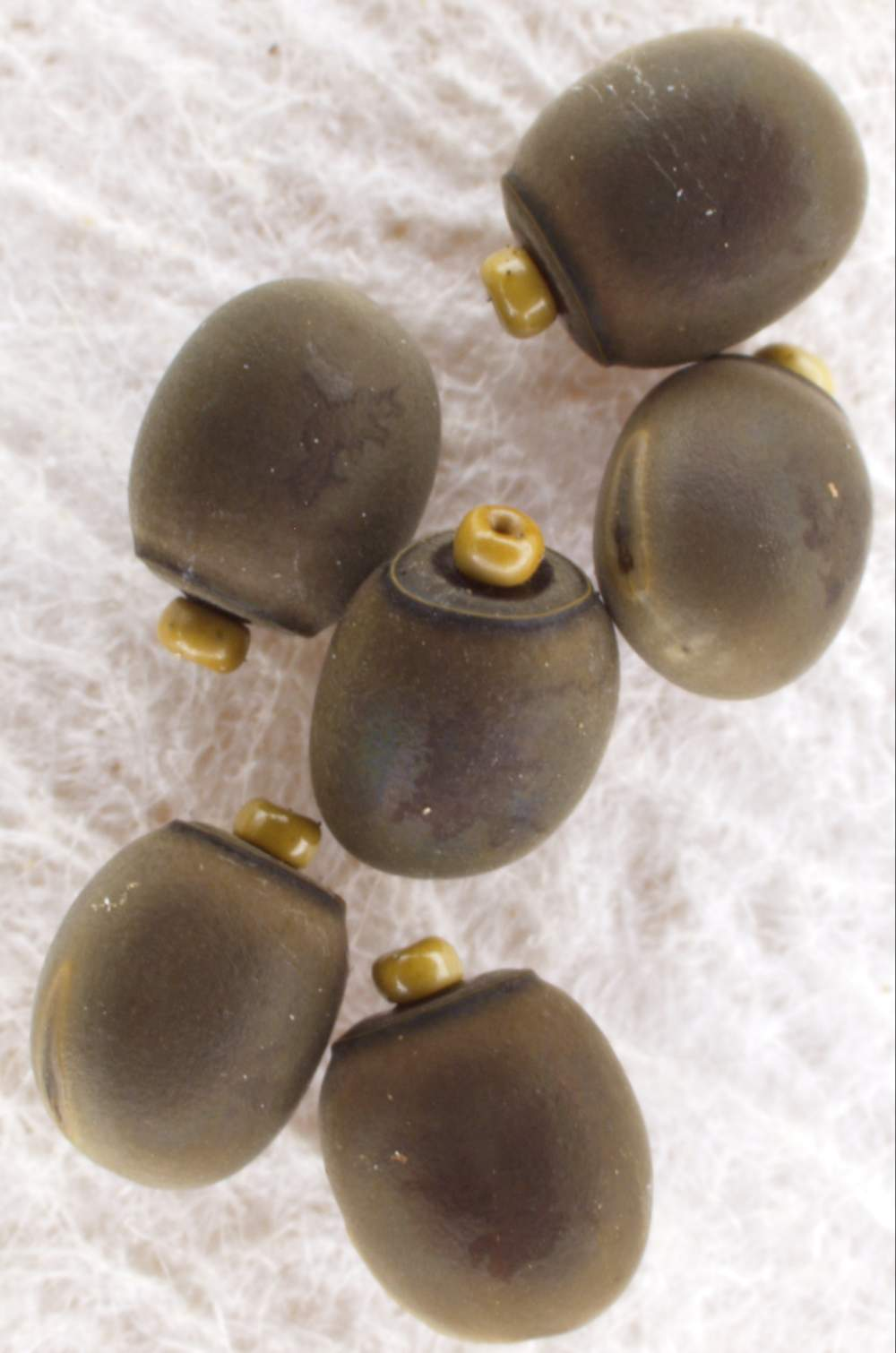
C. morosus eggs.

Females are elongated and about 80–100 mm (3–4 in) in length, ranging from a light green to a darkish brown in colour. The front legs have red patches at the base of the forelegs, and similar but yellow patches on the mid-legs. Eggs are 2 mm (0.08 in) in length, ovoid and brown, with a beige capitula at one end.

=== Hatching ===
When the eggs hatch, the plug opens and dark, tiny, string-like young crawl out of the opening. The eggs are haploid. After hatching, the body of the stick insect can sometimes still be attached to the egg, but it is harmless and comes off mostly at the first moult.

== Behaviour ==
When disturbed, the major defence method is feigning death, the body becoming rigid, and the legs held along the line of the body. They may also be found swaying to mimic the movement of foliage in wind, even if it is just a breath or a small movement of air.

The insects usually feed between dusk and dawn, when they are active. During the day, they rest, often with legs in line with the body, on their food plants or anywhere where they can stay comfortably.

== Accidental introductions ==
Due to their inconspicuous nature, accidental introductions of C. morosus have been recorded around the world, including Great Britain, Portugal, South Africa and the United States, where in some cases they have become a pest. Studies at the San Diego Zoo found the introduced species on a large number of ornamental plants.
