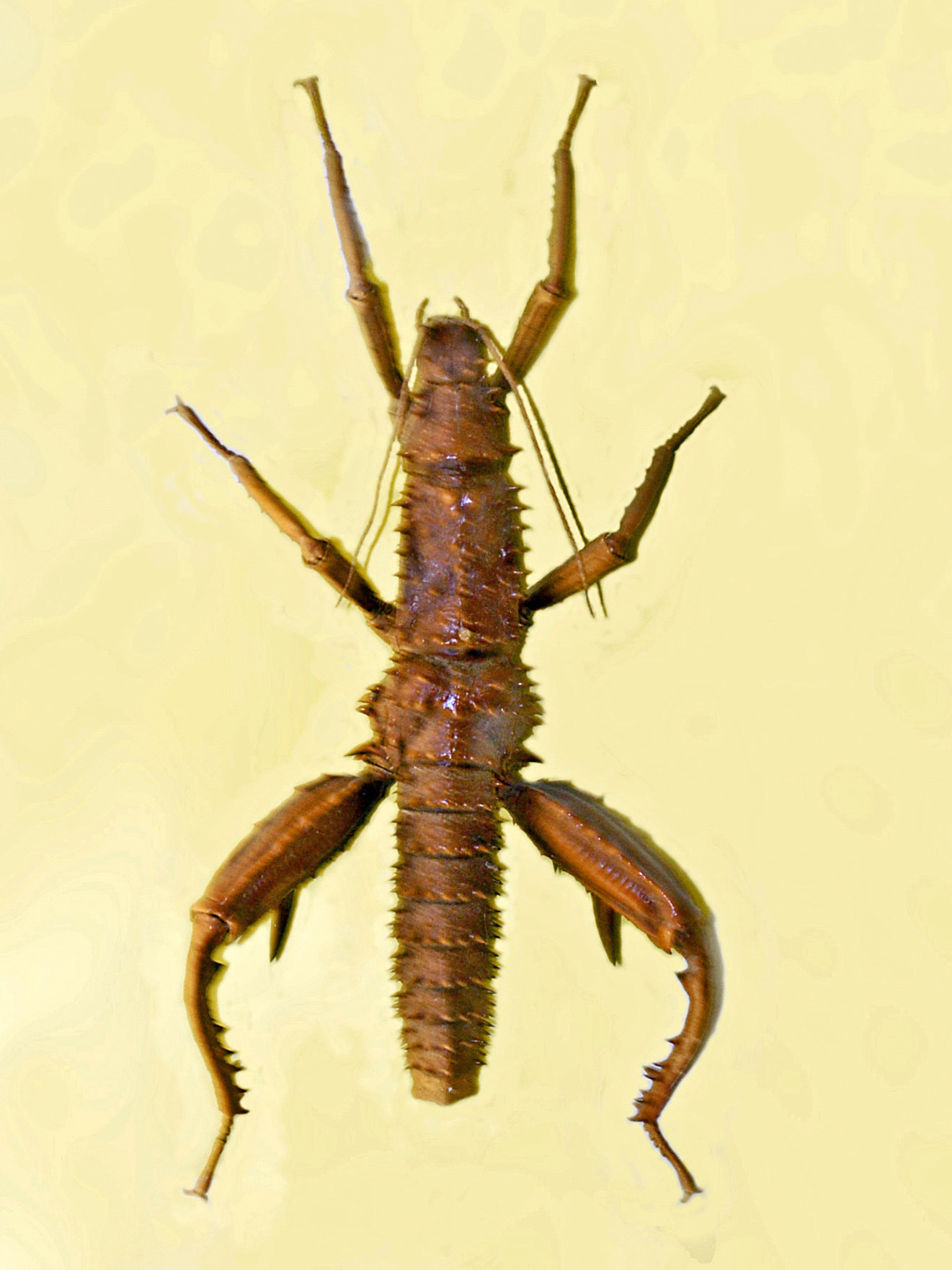
- Eurycantha horrida

Scientific classification
- Kingdom: Animalia
- Phylum: Arthropoda
- Clade: Pancrustacea
- Class: Insecta
- Order: Phasmatodea
- Family: Lonchodidae
- Subfamily: Lonchodinae; Brunner von Wattenwyl, 1893

= Lonchodinae =

Subfamily of stick insects

The Lonchodinae are a subfamily of stick insects in the family Lonchodidae found in: Australasia, Asia, Africa, Southern America and the Pacific.

The subfamilies Necrosciinae and Lonchodinae, formerly part of Diapheromeridae, were determined to make up a separate family and were transferred to the re-established family Lonchodidae in 2018.

== Tribes and genera ==
The Phasmida Species File lists two established tribes:

=== Eurycanthini ===
Authority: Brunner von Wattenwyl, 1893

- Asprenas Stål, 1875
- Brachyrtacus Sharp, 1898
- Canachus Stål, 1875
- Carlius Uvarov, 1939
- Erinaceophasma Zompro, 2001
- Eupromachus Brunner von Wattenwyl, 1907
- Eurycantha Boisduval, 1835
- Labidiophasma Carl, 1915
- Microcanachus Donskoff, 1988
- Neopromachus Giglio-Tos, 1912
- Oreophasma Günther, 1929
- Paracanachus Carl, 1915
- Symetriophasma Hennemann & Conle, 1996
- Thaumatobactron Günther, 1929
- Trapezaspis Redtenbacher, 1908

=== Lonchodini ===
Authority: Brunner von Wattenwyl, 1893 (synonym Menexenini)

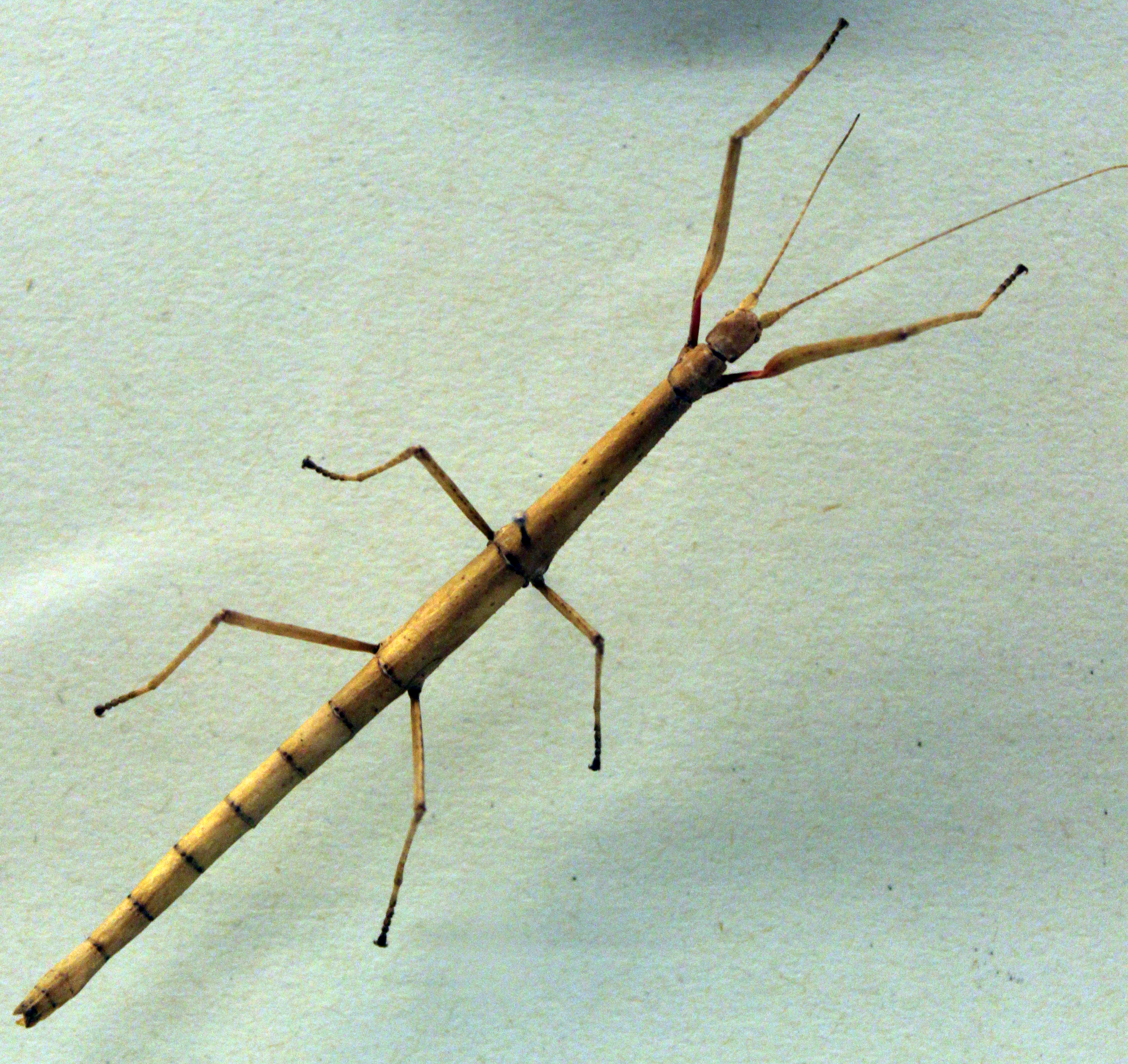
Carausius morosus

- Acanthomenexenus Brock & Hennemann, 2009
- Austrocarausius Brock, 2000
- Baculofractum Zompro, 1995
- Breviphetes Zompro, 1998
- Carausius Stål, 1875
- Chondrostethus Kirby, 1896
- Cladomimus Carl, 1915
- Denhama Werner, 1912
- Echinothorax Günther, 1932
- Gibbopromachus Hennemann, 2021
- Greenia Kirby, 1896
- Hermagoras Stål, 1875
- Hyrtacus Stål, 1875
- Leprocaulinus Uvarov, 1940
- Lonchodes Gray, 1835
- Lonchodiodes Hennemann & Conle, 2007
- Manduria Stål, 1877
- Matutumetes Hennemann & Conle, 2007
- Menexenus Stål, 1875
- Mithrenes Stål, 1877
- Mnesilochus Stål, 1877
- Mortites Günther, 1935
- Myronides Stål, 1875
- Neomyronides Hennemann, 2021
- Paramanduria Hennemann, 2021
- Paraprisomera Hennemann, 2002
- Pericentropsis Günther, 1936
- Pericentrus Redtenbacher, 1908
- Periphetes Stål, 1877
- Phenacephorus Brunner von Wattenwyl, 1907
- Phenacocephalus Werner, 1930
- Phraortes Stål, 1875
- Prisomera Gray, 1835
- Pseudostheneboea Carl, 1913
- Spinacephorus Seow-Choen, 2020
- Spinophetes Zompro & Eusebio, 2000
- Staelonchodes Kirby, 1904
- Stalocagorus Seow-Choen, 2018
- Stheneboea Stål, 1875

=== Incertae Sedis and Re-Named ===
- Megalophasma Bi, 1995
  - Megalophasma asperatum (Bates, 1865)
  - Megalophasma granulatum Bi, 1995
- Papuacocelus papuanus Hennemann & Conle, 2006

The tribe Neohiraseini Hennemann & Conle, 2008 is now considered a junior synonym in the family Diapheromeridae: subfamily Necrosciinae.
