= Chrosiothes =

Chrosiothes Temporal range: Neogene– Present
- female C. niteroi

Scientific classification
- Kingdom: Animalia
- Phylum: Arthropoda
- Subphylum: Chelicerata
- Class: Arachnida
- Order: Araneae
- Infraorder: Araneomorphae
- Family: Theridiidae
- Genus: Chrosiothes; Simon, 1894

Type species
- C. silvaticus Simon, 1894

Species
- 27, see text

Synonyms
- Theridiotis Levi, 1954

Genus of spiders

Chrosiothes is a genus of comb-footed spiders that was first described by Eugène Louis Simon in 1894. It is considered a senior synonym of Theridiotis.

They have thick legs and two minute setae in place of a colulus. Males are noticeably smaller than females. Females of C. jamaicensis are about 2.9 millimetres (0.11 in) long, while males are only about 1.6 millimetres (0.063 in).

They are closely related to members of Episinus, Spintharus, Thwaitesia and Anelosimus.

== Species ==
As of May 2020 it contains twenty-seven species that occurs almost exclusively in the New World from the United States to Brazil, with one species found in China, Korea and Japan, and two species endemic to Taiwan. It also contains 7 extinct species, all found in Dominican ambers:

- Chrosiothes carajaensis Puchulú-Figueiredo, Santanna & Rodrigues, 2017 – Brazil
- Chrosiothes chirica (Levi, 1954) – USA, Mexico
- Chrosiothes cicuta Puchulú-Figueiredo, Santanna & Rodrigues, 2017 – Brazil
- Chrosiothes decorus Puchulú-Figueiredo, Santanna & Rodrigues, 2017 – Brazil
- Chrosiothes diabolicus Puchulú-Figueiredo, Santanna & Rodrigues, 2017 – Brazil
- Chrosiothes episinoides (Levi, 1963) – Chile
- Chrosiothes fulvus Yoshida, Tso & Severinghaus, 2000 – Taiwan
- Chrosiothes goodnightorum (Levi, 1954) – Mexico to Costa Rica
- Chrosiothes iviei Levi, 1964 – USA
- Chrosiothes jamaicensis Levi, 1964 – Jamaica, Dominican Rep.
- Chrosiothes jenningsi Piel, 1995 – USA
- Chrosiothes jocosus (Gertsch & Davis, 1936) – USA, Mexico
- Chrosiothes litus Levi, 1964 – Mexico
- Chrosiothes minusculus (Gertsch, 1936) – USA, Mexico
- Chrosiothes murici Puchulú-Figueiredo, Santanna & Rodrigues, 2017 – Brazil
- Chrosiothes niteroi Levi, 1964 – Bolivia, Brazil, Argentina
- Chrosiothes perfidus Marques & Buckup, 1997 – Brazil
- Chrosiothes portalensis Levi, 1964 – USA, Mexico
- Chrosiothes proximus (O. Pickard-Cambridge, 1899) – Mexico to Panama
- Chrosiothes silvaticus Simon, 1894 (type) – USA to Ecuador
- Chrosiothes sudabides (Bösenberg & Strand, 1906) – China, Korea, Japan
- Chrosiothes taiwan Yoshida, Tso & Severinghaus, 2000 – Taiwan
- Chrosiothes tonala (Levi, 1954) – Mexico to Honduras
- Chrosiothes una Puchulú-Figueiredo, Santanna & Rodrigues, 2017 – Brazil
- Chrosiothes valmonti (Simon, 1898) – St. Vincent
- Chrosiothes venturosus Marques & Buckup, 1997 – Brazil
- Chrosiothes wagneri (Levi, 1954) – Mexico
- †Chrosiothes biconigerus (Wunderlich, 1988) – Dominican Amber – Miocene
- †Chrosiothes curvispinosus (Wunderlich, 1988) – Dominican Amber – Miocene
- †Chrosiothes emulgatus (Wunderlich, 1988) – Dominican Amber – Miocene
- †Chrosiothes longispinosus (Wunderlich, 1988) – Dominican Amber – Miocene
- †Chrosiothes monoceros (Wunderlich, 1988) – Dominican Amber – Miocene
- †Chrosiothes tumulus (Wunderlich, 1988) – Dominican Amber – Miocene
- †Chrosiothes unicornis (Wunderlich, 1988) – Dominican Amber – Miocene

Formerly included:

- C. australis (Simon, 1896) (Transferred to Episinus)
