= Carausius proximus =

Scientific classification
- Kingdom: Animalia
- Phylum: Arthropoda
- Class: Insecta
- Order: Phasmatodea
- Family: Lonchodidae
- Genus: Carausius
- Species: C. proximus

Binomial name
- Carausius proximus Carl, 1913

Species of insect

Carausius proximus is a species of phasmid.
