= Asprenas =

Scientific classification
- Kingdom: Animalia
- Phylum: Arthropoda
- Clade: Pancrustacea
- Class: Insecta
- Order: Phasmatodea
- Family: Lonchodidae
- Tribe: Eurycanthini
- Genus: Asprenas; Stål, 1875

Genus of insects

Asprenas is a genus of Australasian stick insects belonging to the tribe Eurycanthini.

Species:

- Asprenas brunneri (Stål, 1875)
- Asprenas crassipes Redtenbacher, 1908
- Asprenas dubius Carl, 1915
- Asprenas effeminatus Carl, 1913
- Asprenas femoratus Stål, 1875
- Asprenas gracilipes Redtenbacher, 1908
- Asprenas impennis Carl, 1913
- Asprenas sarasini Carl, 1915
- Asprenas spiniventris (Sharp, 1898)
