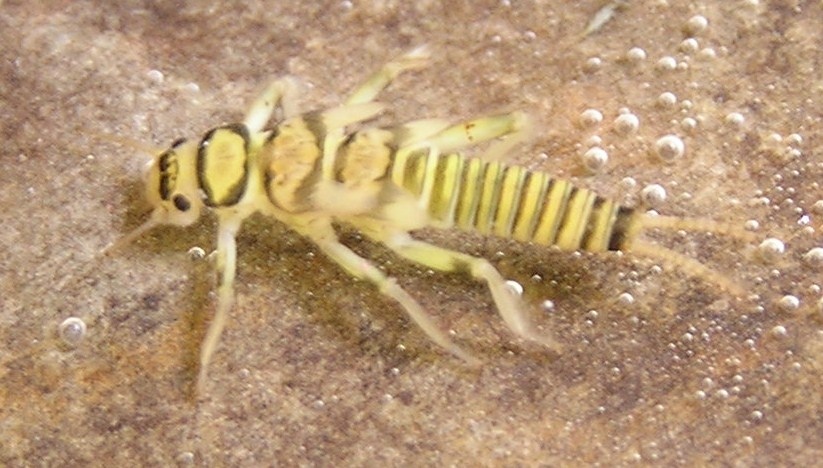
- Helopicus subvarians

Scientific classification
- Domain: Eukaryota
- Kingdom: Animalia
- Phylum: Arthropoda
- Class: Insecta
- Order: Plecoptera
- Family: Perlodidae
- Subfamily: Perlodinae

Tribes
- Arcynopterygini Ricker & Scudder, 1975; Diploperlini Stark & Szczytko, 1984; Perlodini Klapálek, 1909

= Perlodinae =

Subfamily of stoneflies

Perlodinae is a subfamily of stoneflies in the family Perlodidae.

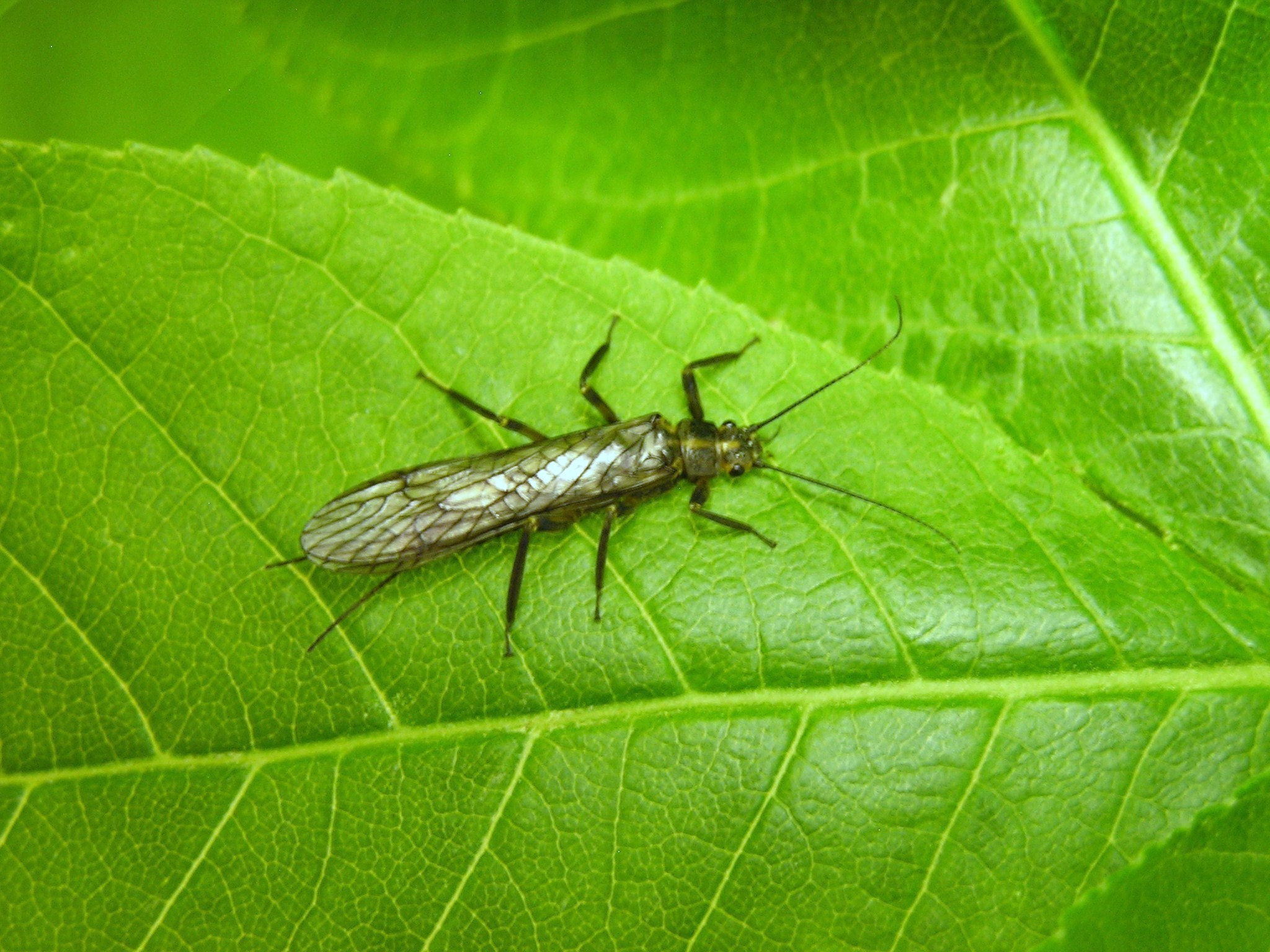
Helopicus subvarians

== Genera ==
There are three tribes in the subfamily Perlodinae; selected genera include:

- Arcynopteryx Klapálek, 1904^{i c g}
- Cultus Ricker, 1952^{i c g b}
- Diploperla Needham & Claassen, 1925^{i c g b}
- Diura Billberg, 1820^{i c g b}
- Helopicus Ricker, 1952^{i c g b}
- Isogenoides Klapálek, 1912^{i c g b}
- Malirekus Ricker, 1952^{i c g b}
- Megarcys Klapálek, 1912^{i c g b}
- Perlodes Banks, 1903
- Skwala Ricker, 1943^{i c g b}
- Susulus Bottorff & Stewart, 1989^{i c g b}

Data sources: i = ITIS, c = Catalogue of Life, g = GBIF, b = Bugguide.net
