= Diura chronus =

Diura chronus has been a name for an insect species:

- Diura chronus is a junior synonym for the Australian stick insect Ctenomorpha marginipennis.
- Diura is a valid name for a genus of stoneflies.
