= Malirekus iroquois =

Scientific classification
- Domain: Eukaryota
- Kingdom: Animalia
- Phylum: Arthropoda
- Class: Insecta
- Order: Plecoptera
- Family: Perlodidae
- Tribe: Perlodini
- Genus: Malirekus
- Species: M. iroquois

Binomial name
- Malirekus iroquois Stark & Szczytko, 1988

Species of stonefly

Malirekus iroquois, the Iroquois springfly, is a species of springfly in the family Perlodidae. It is found in North America.
