= Olive Grey (entomologist) =

Entomologist (1871–1954)

Olive Grey FZS
- Born: 26 April 1871; Horsham, Sussex, England
- Died: 28 April 1954 (aged 83); London, England
- Other names: Elers Harriet Mathews; Elers Harriet Ashburner; Elers Harriet Grey; Olive Elers Harriet Grey; O.G.
- Occupation: Entomologist
- Years active: 1923–1936

Olive Grey FZS (26 April 1871 – 28 April 1954) was a British entomologist.

== Early life and marriage ==
Grey was born Elers Harriet Mathews at Horsham, Sussex on 26 April 1871. Grey's parents were Henry John Davis Mathews, a surgeon and General Practitioner, and Elizabeth Ashburner Mathews (née Smith). By 1873, Grey's father had changed the family's surname to Ashburner.

Grey's mother Elizabeth died in 1875 when Grey was just four years old, and her father remarried two years later. After the death of her father in 1883, Grey lived with her stepmother Fanny and in 1891 at the age of 19 Grey was working as a Government Telegraph Clerk.

In 1907 Grey married Major William Ernest Grey (1861–1925), who was a journalist at The Morning Post.

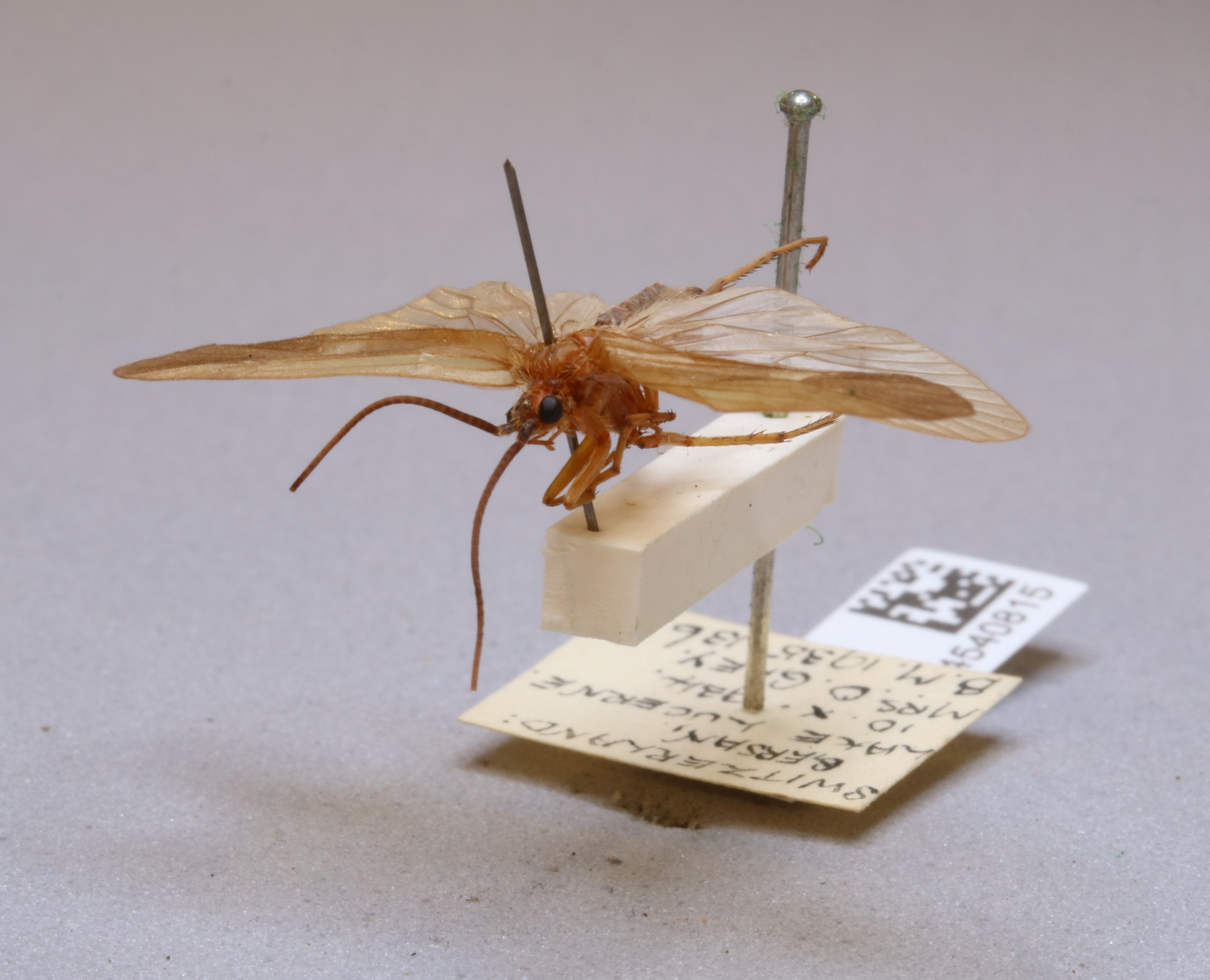
A specimen of the caddisfly species Anabolia nervosa (Curtis, 1834) collected by Mrs O. Grey at Switzerland in 1934 (NHMUK014540815).

== Entomology ==
Grey was made a Fellow of the Zoological Society of London in 1923. Grey was admitted to the South London Entomological and Natural History Society in 1926, where her main interest was listed as 'ent.' (general entomology instead of specialising upon a particular insect order). In June 1927 Grey exhibited Australian Cicadas at the South London Society with notes about their common names.

In 1934 Grey assisted William Edward China of the British Museum (Natural History) as part of a team who contributed records so that entomologist Alfred Thornley (1855–1947) could update the Cornish Hemiptera occurrence list. In a similar project in 1936, Grey assisted Martin Mosely of the B.M.N.H. by submitting Plecoptera occurrence records from Scotland.

Grey's extant specimens show that besides work in the U.K. she was an active insect collector in France, Germany, Italy, Switzerland and Austria before World War 2.

Specimens collected by Grey are held in the collection of the Natural History Museum, London.

== Name ==
"Olive Grey" does not appear to have been Grey's legal name, but Grey's official probate record confirms that Grey was known as Olive as well as her legal first name Elers. "Olive Grey" is the name Grey used for her entomological records.
