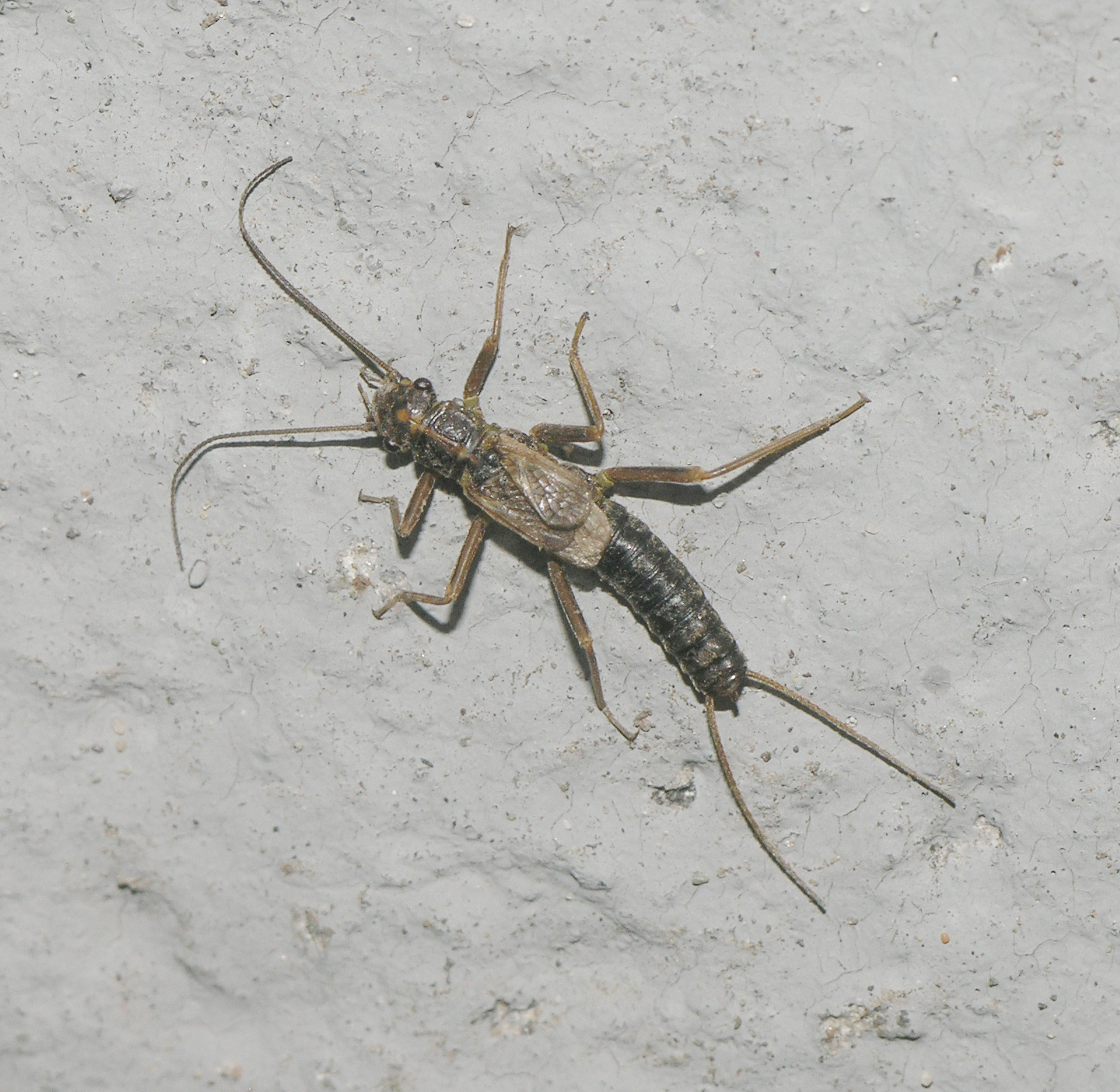
- Diura bicaudata

Scientific classification
- Domain: Eukaryota
- Kingdom: Animalia
- Phylum: Arthropoda
- Class: Insecta
- Order: Plecoptera
- Family: Perlodidae
- Tribe: Perlodini
- Genus: Diura; Billberg, 1820

= Diura =

Genus of stoneflies

Diura is a genus of insects belonging to the family Perlodidae, subfamily Perlodinae and tribe Perlodini.

The species of this genus are found in Europe and Northern America.

== Species ==
The Global Biodiversity Information Facility lists:

1. Diura bicaudata (Linnaeus, 1758) type species (as Phryganea bicaudata Linnaeus, 1758)
2. Diura frequens (Matsumura, 1905)
3. Diura knowltoni (Frison, 1937)
4. Diura majuscula (Klapálek, 1912)
5. Diura nanseni (Kempny, 1900)
6. Diura washingtoniana (Hanson, 1940)

Note: the name Diura chronus is a synonym for the Australian stick insect Ctenomorpha marginipennis; having been placed in the genus Didymuria by William Forsell Kirby in 1904, it was subsequently accepted as Ctenomorpha chronus (Gray, 1833).
