= Cultus verticalis =

Scientific classification
- Domain: Eukaryota
- Kingdom: Animalia
- Phylum: Arthropoda
- Class: Insecta
- Order: Plecoptera
- Family: Perlodidae
- Tribe: Diploperlini
- Genus: Cultus
- Species: C. verticalis

Binomial name
- Cultus verticalis (Banks, 1920)

Species of stonefly

Cultus verticalis, the spiny springfly, is a species of springfly in the family Perlodidae. It is found in North America.
