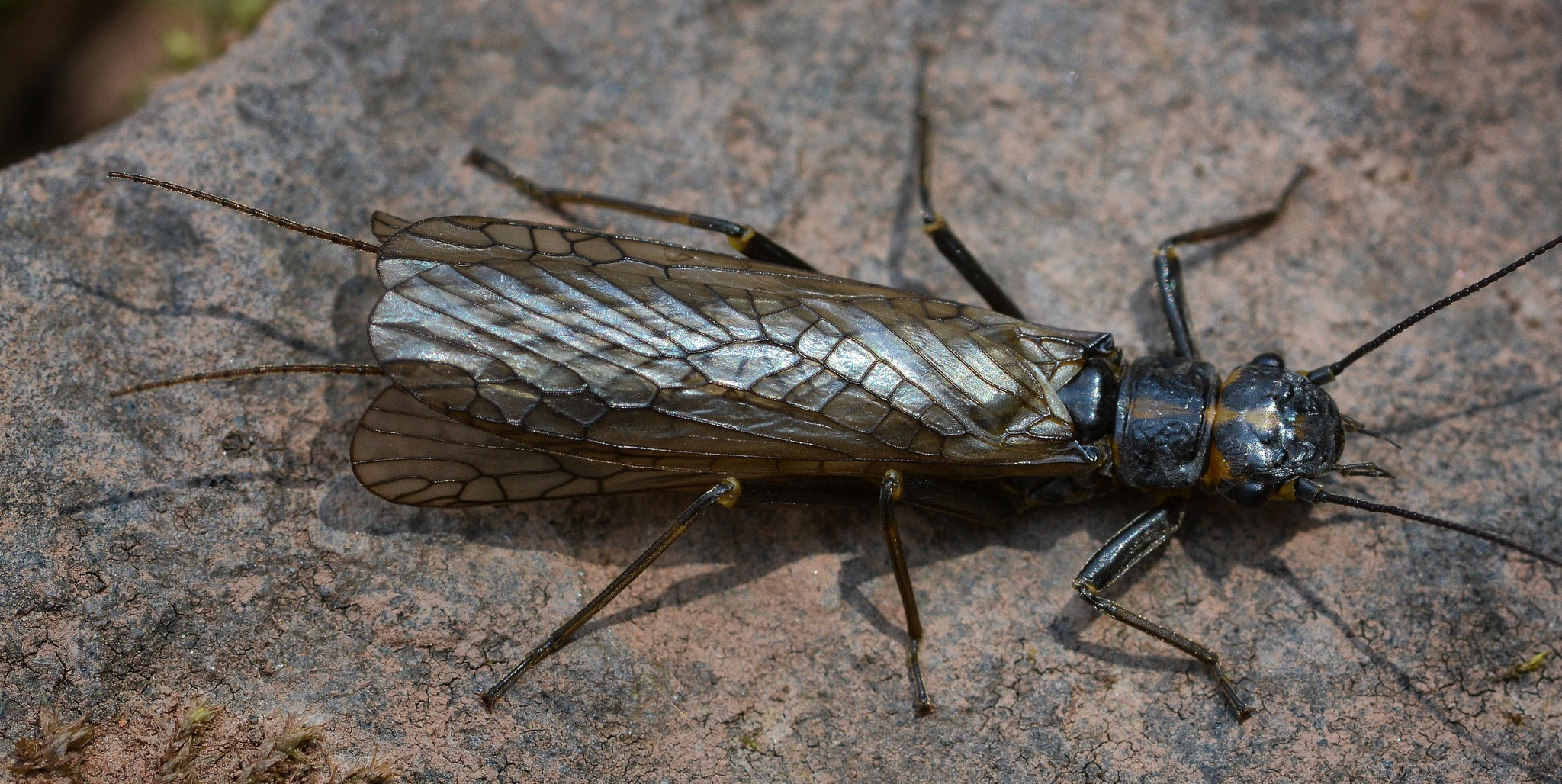

Conservation status
- Least Concern (IUCN 3.1)

Scientific classification
- Kingdom: Animalia
- Phylum: Arthropoda
- Class: Insecta
- Order: Plecoptera
- Family: Perlodidae
- Genus: Perlodes
- Species: P. mortoni

Binomial name
- Perlodes mortoni Klapálek, 1906

= Perlodes mortoni =

Species of insect

Perlodes mortoni, the orange-striped stonefly, is a species of stonefly that is found in Great Britain.

== Description ==
Perlodes mortoni shares similar characteristics with the European P. dispar and P. microcephalus species. P. mircrocephalus may have a presence in Britain but further evidence is needed for confirmation.

The males are brachypterous, meaning they have very short wings that are recorded as being between 1.4 and 1.8 times as long as its head width. This could perhaps be an adaptation to high wind speed found in their habitat as flight could risk displacement from ideal conditions. Females have fully formed wings.

Adults have an omnivorous diet, eating vegetable matter and preying upon aquatic invertebrates.

It overwinters as a nymph and flight season extends from March to June, peaking in May.

== Range ==
The stonefly is widespread in rivers across Great Britain and is thought to be an endemic species. Its conservation status was assessed by the IUCN Red List in 2021 and found to be of Least Concern.

In Ireland, the species was recorded by King and Halbert in Kerry (no year given) and Louth (1910). Recent efforts to find it have been unsuccessful and as such the species is deemed Regionally Extinct in Ireland.

== Habitat ==
Stonefly nymphs are found in rivers and streams, where they live between stones. They seem to prefer well oxygenated water. Adults are usually found near river banks.

== Taxonomy ==
Perlodes mortoni was previously synonymised with P. microcephalus by Illies in 1955 but was removed from synonymy in 2011 and found to be a distinct species.
