= Isogenus =

Scientific classification
- Domain: Eukaryota
- Kingdom: Animalia
- Phylum: Arthropoda
- Class: Insecta
- Order: Plecoptera
- Family: Perlodidae
- Subfamily: Perlodinae
- Tribe: Perlodini
- Genus: Isogenus; Newman, 1833

Synonyms
- Nephelion Pictet, 1841

Genus of stoneflies

Isogenus is a genus of insect belonging to the family Perlodidae.

The genus was first described by Newman in 1833.

The species of this genus are mostly found in the Palaearctic realm.

== Species ==
The Plecoptera Species File lists:

1. Isogenus kohbonis Ricker, 1952
2. Isogenus ligea Newman, 1839
3. Isogenus nakaharae Okamoto, 1912
4. Isogenus nubecula Newman, 1833 - type species
