= Isogenoides frontalis =

Scientific classification
- Domain: Eukaryota
- Kingdom: Animalia
- Phylum: Arthropoda
- Class: Insecta
- Order: Plecoptera
- Family: Perlodidae
- Tribe: Perlodini
- Genus: Isogenoides
- Species: I. frontalis

Binomial name
- Isogenoides frontalis (Newman, 1838)

Synonyms
- Isogenus frontalis Newman, 1838

Species of stonefly

Isogenoides frontalis, the Hudsonian springfly, is a species of springfly in the family Perlodidae. It is found in North America.
