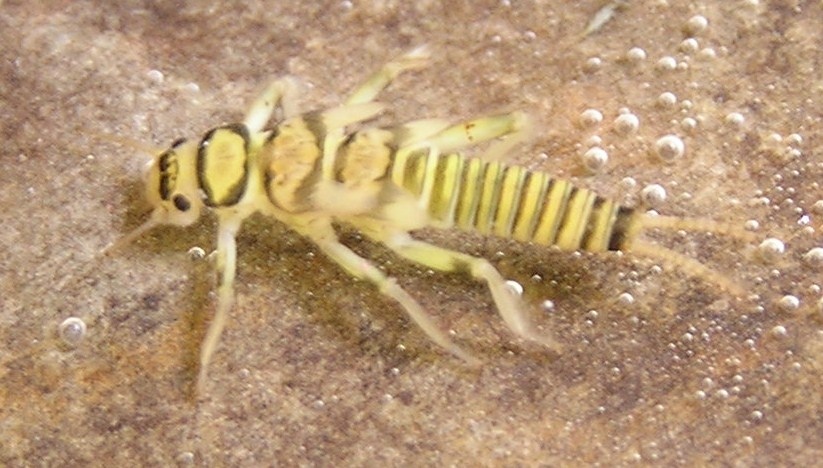

Scientific classification
- Domain: Eukaryota
- Kingdom: Animalia
- Phylum: Arthropoda
- Class: Insecta
- Order: Plecoptera
- Family: Perlodidae
- Tribe: Perlodini
- Genus: Helopicus
- Species: H. subvarians

Binomial name
- Helopicus subvarians (Banks, 1920)

= Helopicus subvarians =

Species of stonefly

Helopicus subvarians, the vernal springfly, is a species of springfly in the family Perlodidae. It is found in North America.

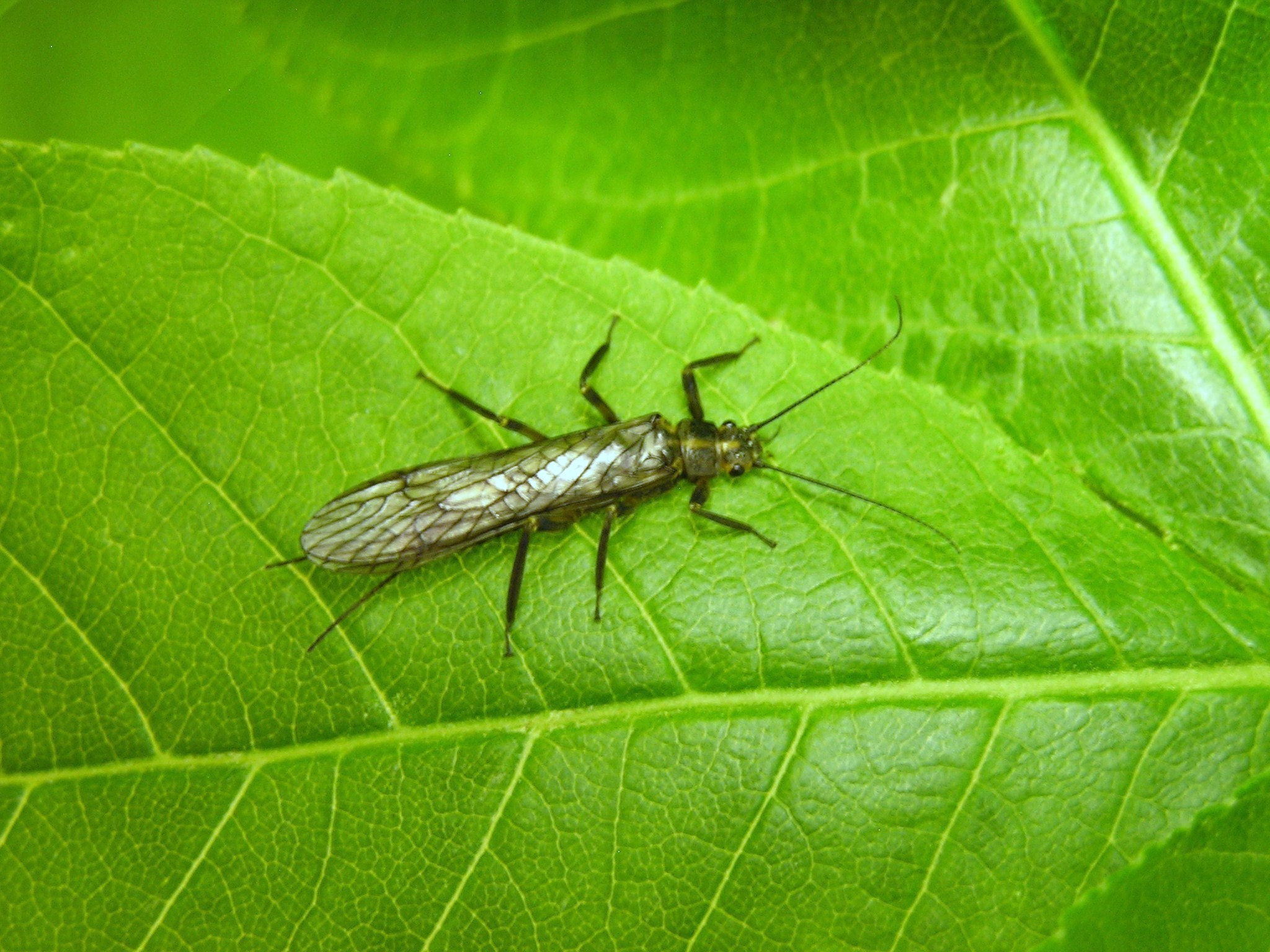
Vernal springfly, Helopicus subvarians
