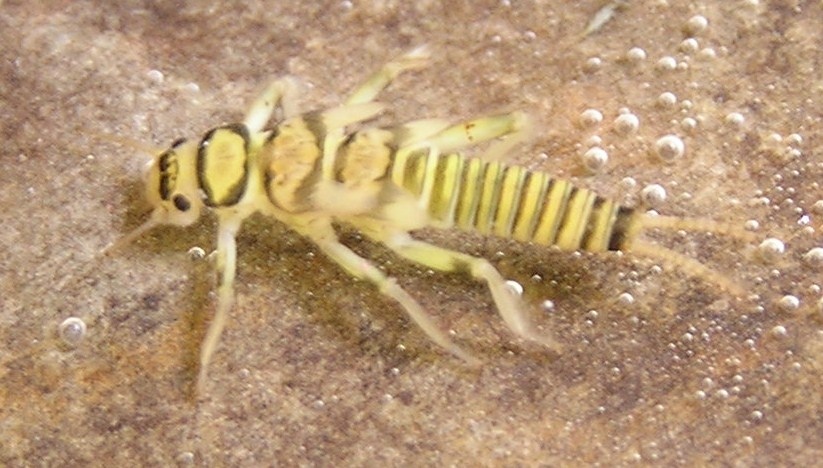
- Helopicus subvarians

Scientific classification
- Domain: Eukaryota
- Kingdom: Animalia
- Phylum: Arthropoda
- Class: Insecta
- Order: Plecoptera
- Family: Perlodidae
- Subfamily: Perlodinae
- Tribe: Perlodini
- Genus: Helopicus; Ricker, 1952

= Helopicus =

Genus of stoneflies

Helopicus is a genus of springflies in the family Perlodidae. There are at least four described species in Helopicus.

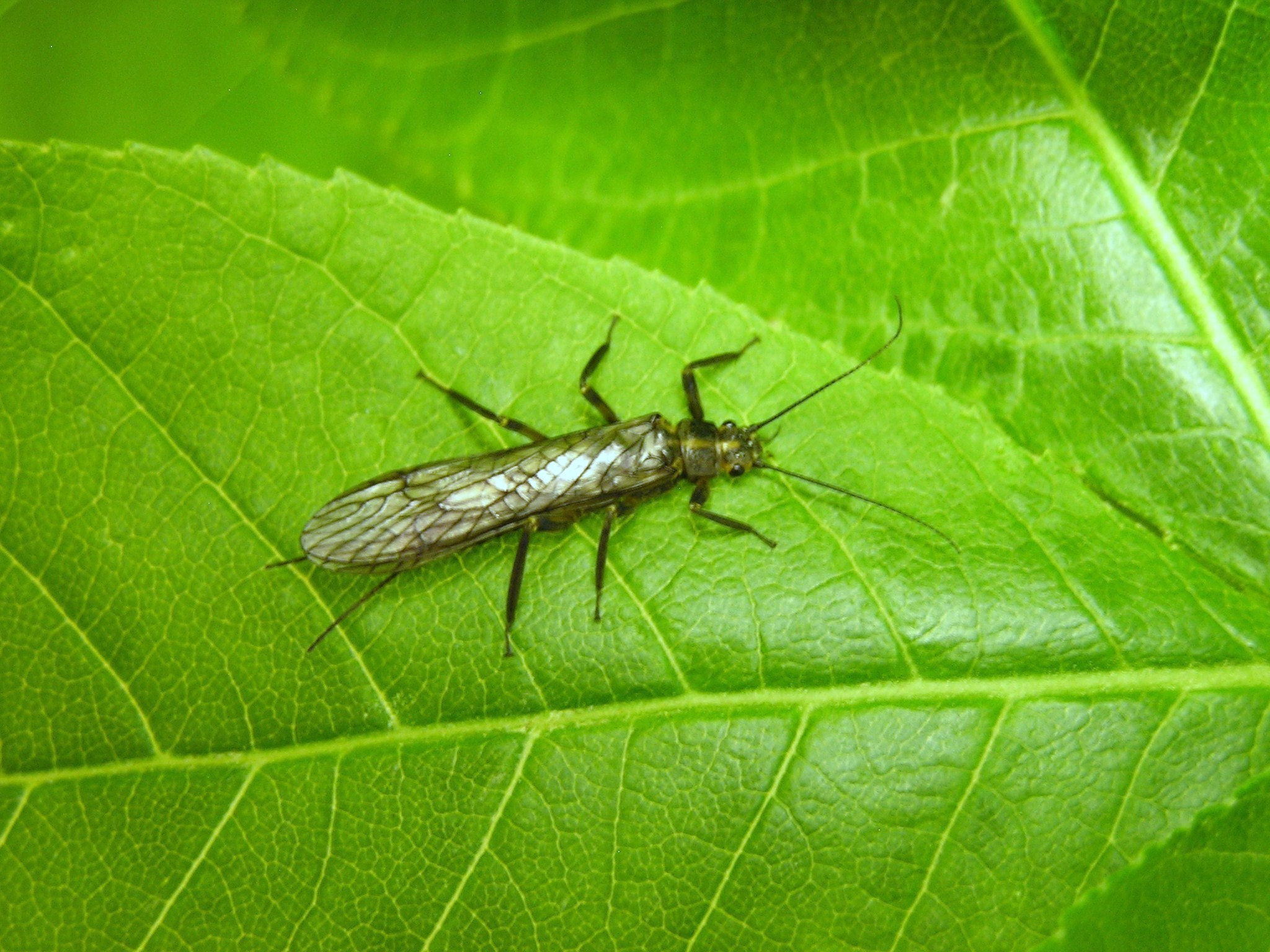
Helopicus subvarians

== Species ==
These four species belong to the genus Helopicus:

- Helopicus bogaloosa Stark & Ray, 1983
- Helopicus infuscatus (Newman, 1838)
- Helopicus nalatus (Frison, 1942)
- Helopicus subvarians (Banks, 1920) (vernal springfly)
