= Isogenus nubecula =

Scientific classification
- Domain: Eukaryota
- Kingdom: Animalia
- Phylum: Arthropoda
- Class: Insecta
- Order: Plecoptera
- Family: Perlodidae
- Genus: Isogenus
- Species: I. nubecula

Binomial name
- Isogenus nubecula Newman, 1833

Species of stonefly

Isogenus nubecula, also known as scarce yellow sally, is a species of stonefly belonging to the family Perlodidae. It is native to Europe.

The insect was thought to be extinct in Britain, having last been recorded in 1995, but a small population was found on the River Dee, Wales in 2017. In 2023, the insects were being bred in captivity at Chester Zoo with a view to reintroduction to the wild when water quality has improved.

The species is regarded as critically endangered.
