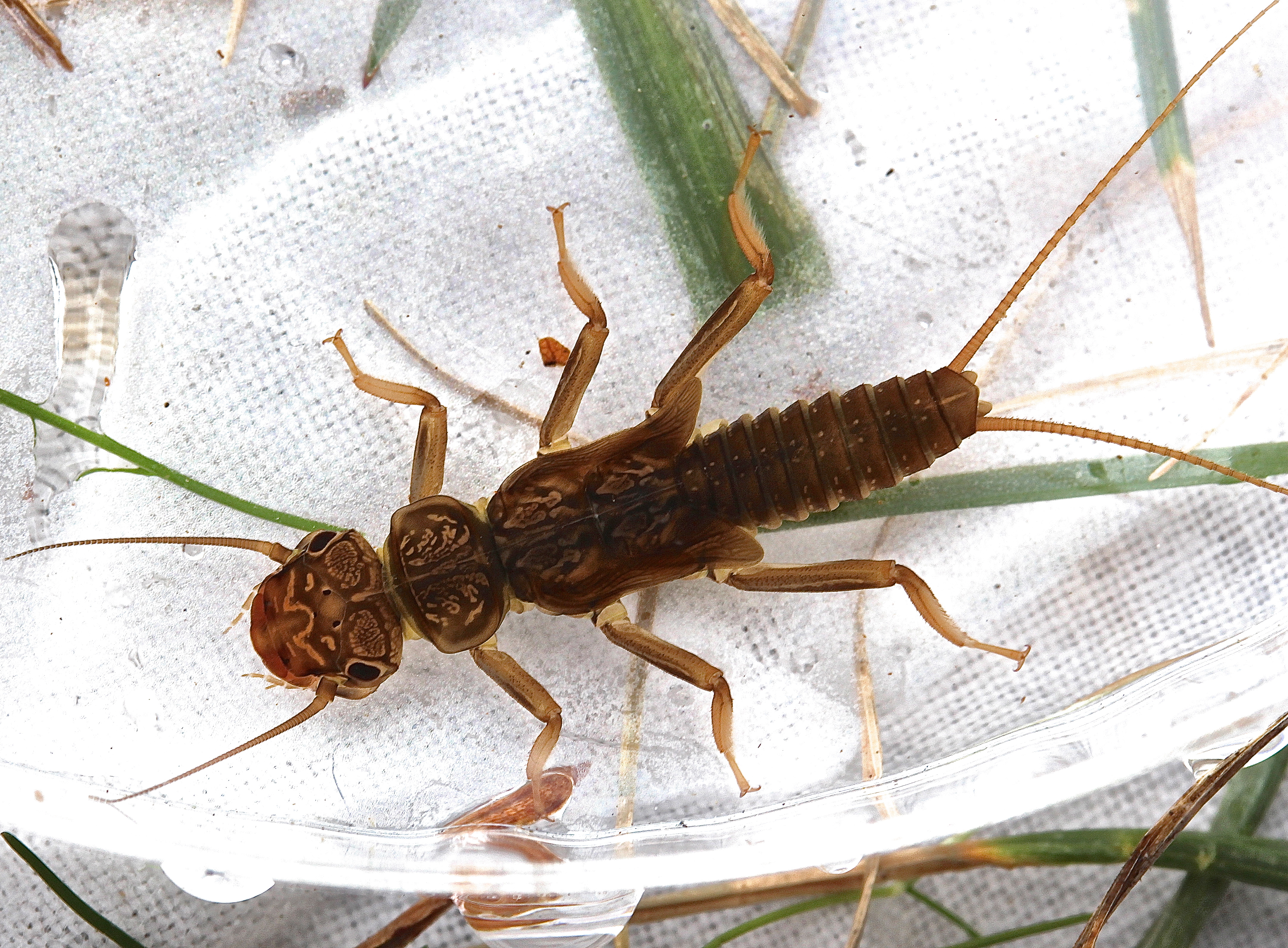
- Malirekus hastatus

Scientific classification
- Domain: Eukaryota
- Kingdom: Animalia
- Phylum: Arthropoda
- Class: Insecta
- Order: Plecoptera
- Family: Perlodidae
- Subfamily: Perlodinae
- Tribe: Perlodini
- Genus: Malirekus; Ricker, 1952

= Malirekus =

Genus of stoneflies

Malirekus is a genus of springflies in the family Perlodidae. There are at least two described species in Malirekus.

== Species ==
These two species belong to the genus Malirekus:

- Malirekus hastatus (Banks, 1920) (brook springfly)
- Malirekus iroquois Stark & Szczytko, 1988 (Iroquois springfly)
