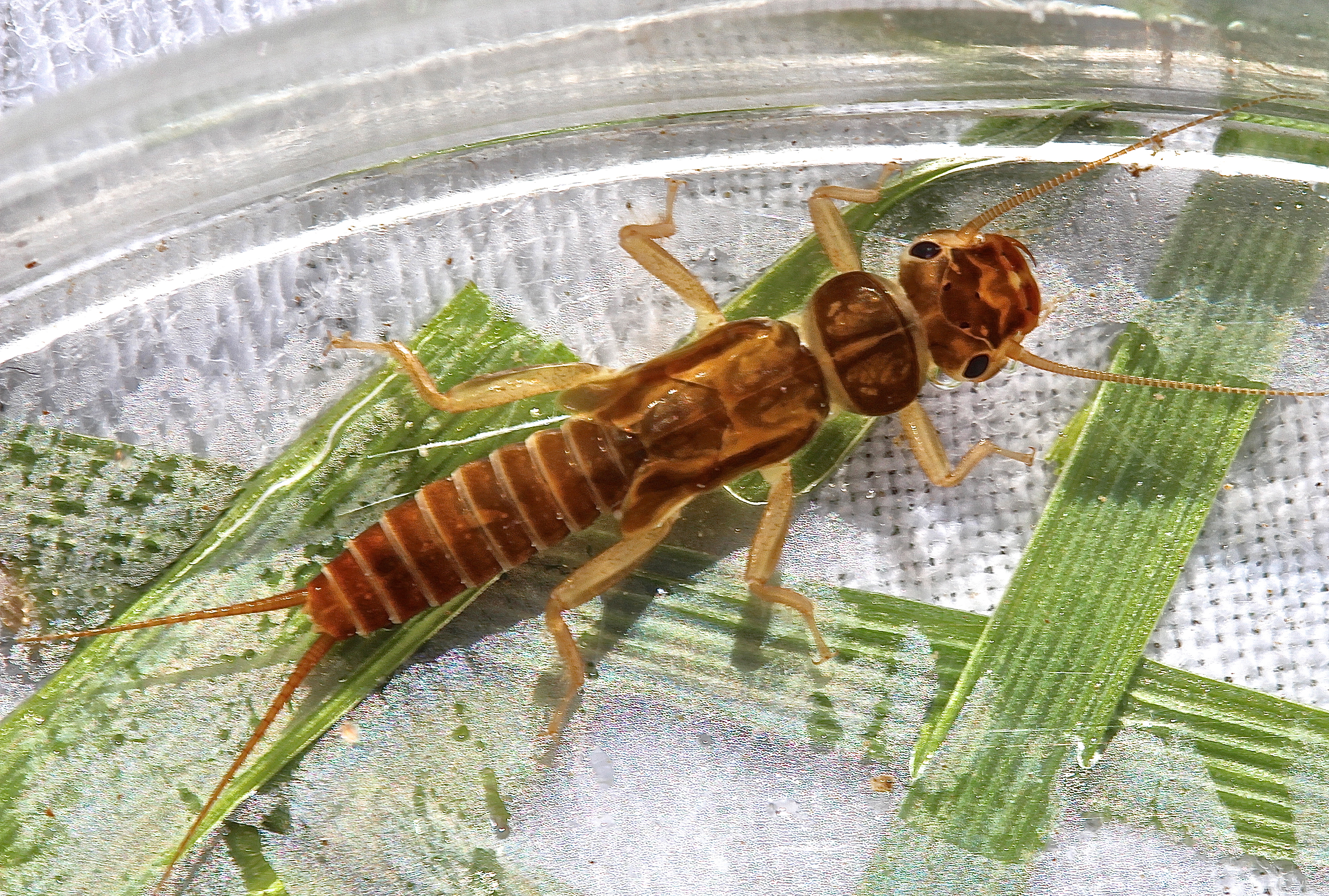

Scientific classification
- Kingdom: Animalia
- Phylum: Arthropoda
- Class: Insecta
- Order: Plecoptera
- Family: Perlodidae
- Genus: Diploperla
- Species: D. duplicata

Binomial name
- Diploperla duplicata (Banks, 1920)

= Diploperla duplicata =

Species of stonefly

Diploperla duplicata, the two-lobed springfly, is a species of springfly in the family Perlodidae. It is found in North America.
