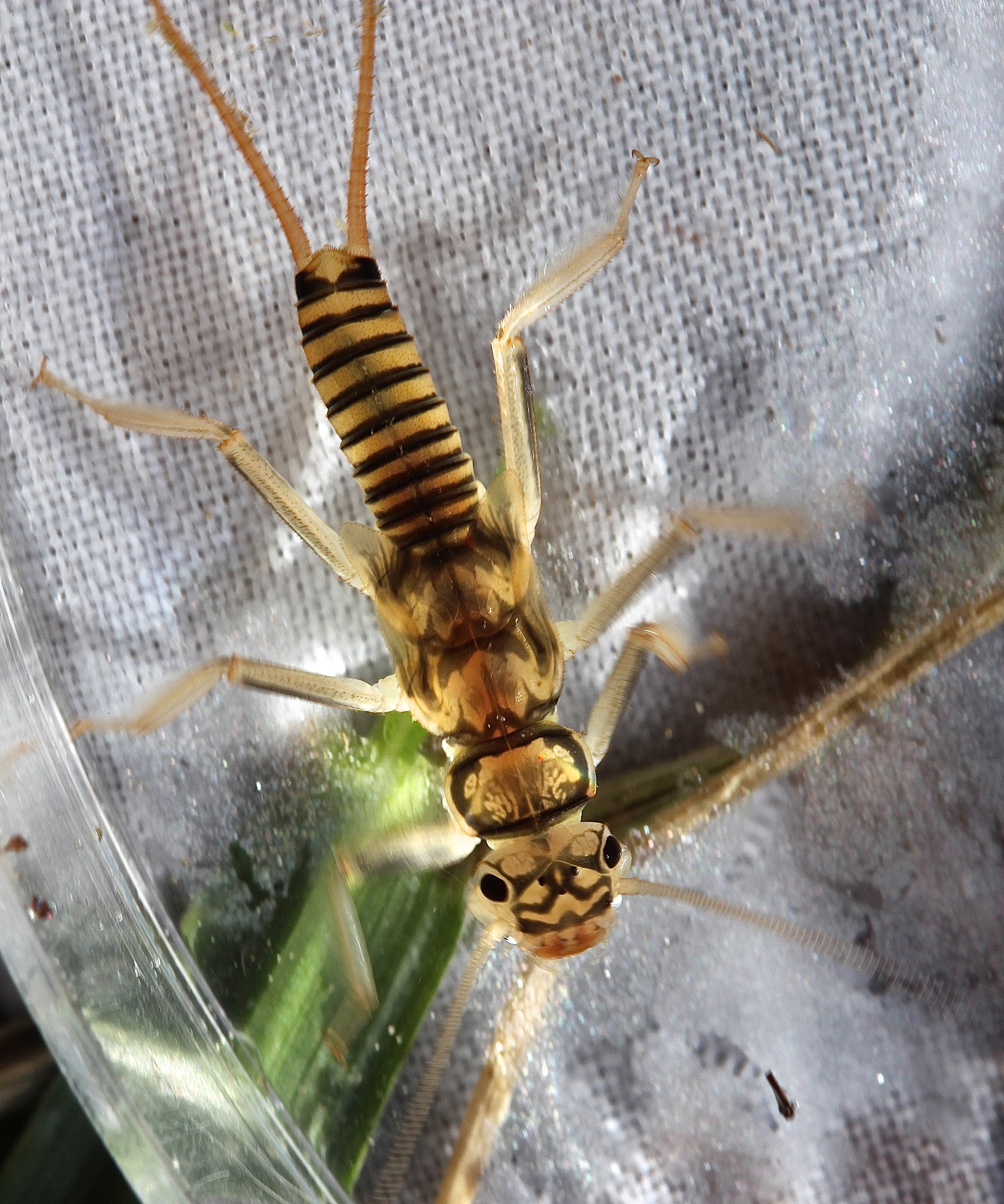
- Isogenoides hansoni

Scientific classification
- Domain: Eukaryota
- Kingdom: Animalia
- Phylum: Arthropoda
- Class: Insecta
- Order: Plecoptera
- Family: Perlodidae
- Subfamily: Perlodinae
- Tribe: Perlodini
- Genus: Isogenoides; Klapálek, 1912

= Isogenoides =

Genus of stoneflies

Isogenoides is a genus of springflies in the family Perlodidae. There are about eight described species in Isogenoides.

== Species ==
These eight species belong to the genus Isogenoides:

- Isogenoides colubrinus (Hagen, 1874)
- Isogenoides doratus (Frison, 1942)
- Isogenoides elongatus (Hagen, 1874)
- Isogenoides frontalis (Newman, 1838) (hudsonian springfly)
- Isogenoides hansoni (Ricker, 1952) (Appalachian springfly)
- Isogenoides olivaceus (Walker, 1852)
- Isogenoides varians (Walsh, 1862)
- Isogenoides zionensis Hanson, 1949
