= Kenneth Morton =

Scottish entomologist (1858–1940)

Kenneth J. Morton (1858 – 29 January 1940) was a Scottish entomologist, with a particular interest in the study of Odonata and Neuroptera. He was born at Carluke, Lanarkshire, Scotland, and he died at Edinburgh.

His collections are held at the National Museums of Scotland. They include specimens of dragonflies (from worldwide), caddis flies, lacewings and stoneflies.

== Biography ==
Kenneth John Morton was born on 5 August 1858. His parents were Andrew Morton (b. circa 1820), a cabinet maker, sawmill foreman and Ironmonger who ran a business in Carluke High Street, and Helen Valentine Home (b. circa 1823), who had married in 1847. Morton had sisters named Eleanor and Sarah. In 1940 the Morton family were described as one of the oldest families of Carluke.

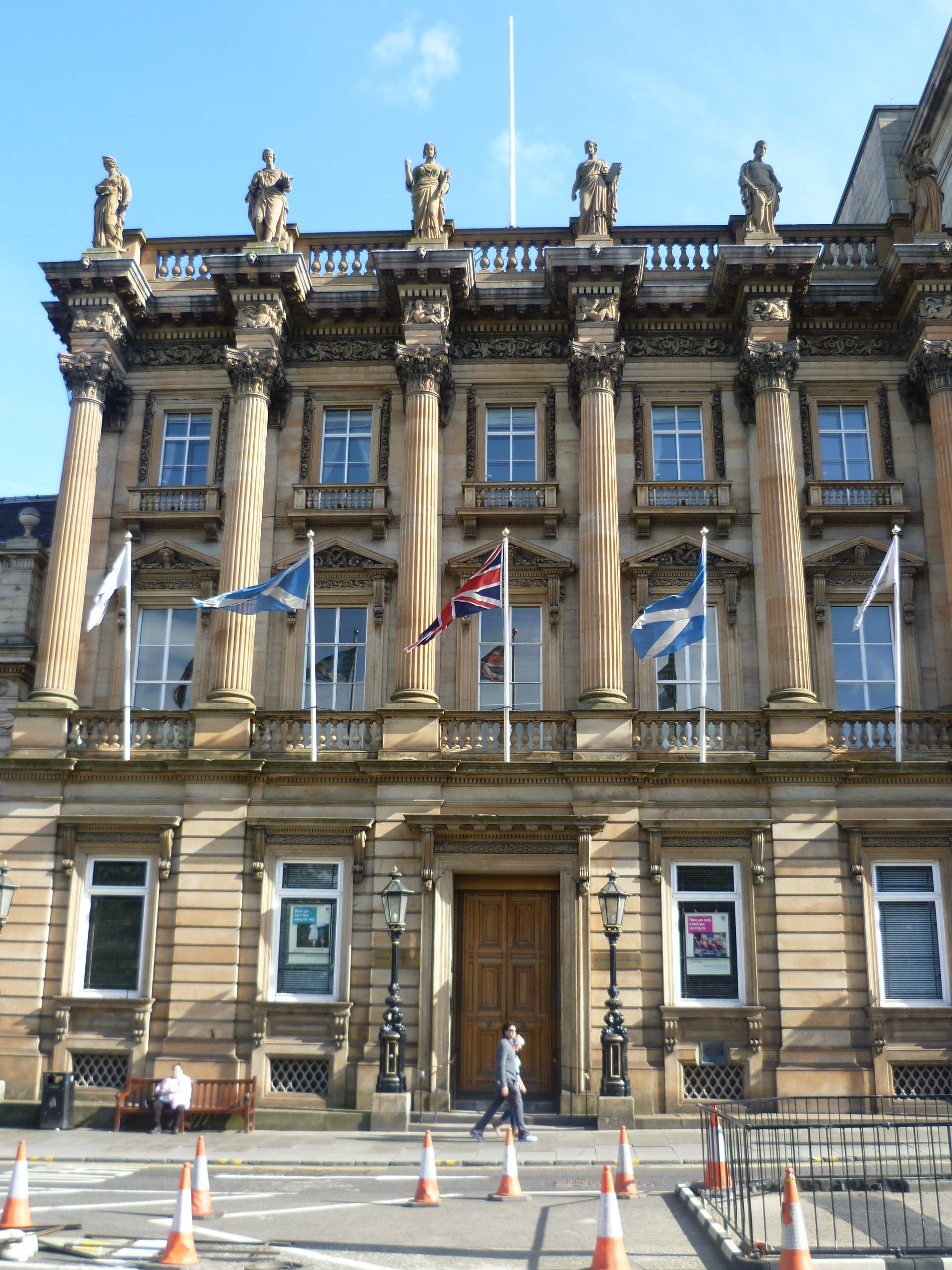
Morton's workplace, the former Head Office of the British Linen Bank, St. Andrew Square Edinburgh (picture: Kim Traynor)

Kenneth Morton's regular job was as a secretary and accountant at the British Linen Bank, beginning his employment at the age of 16 in Glasgow but eventually moving to the Bank's head office in Edinburgh. Morton retired from his job at the bank circa 1923.

In 1888 Morton married Agnes Brownlee Forrest Freeland of Glasgow: they had already been acquainted for at least five years as Freeland is recorded as sending Morton a collection of insects from Glaslough, Ireland in 1883, which Morton wrote about in The Entomologist's Monthly Magazine. The couple had four children: Marguerite Forrest Ross Morton (1889-1972), Helena Valentine Morton (c.1890-1906), Andrew Morton (b. and d. 1891) and Kenneth Valentine Morton (c.1907-2003). Later in their marriage, Morton was sometimes accompanied by Agnes on entomological fieldwork e.g. on trips to Norway in 1900 and Switzerland in 1904, and he noted that she was a skilled insect collector in her own right.

Morton was a friend of James Joseph Francis Xavier King, and they went on entomological study trips together, e.g. to Killarney, Ireland in August 1887 and Rannoch in the Scottish Highlands in June 1889.

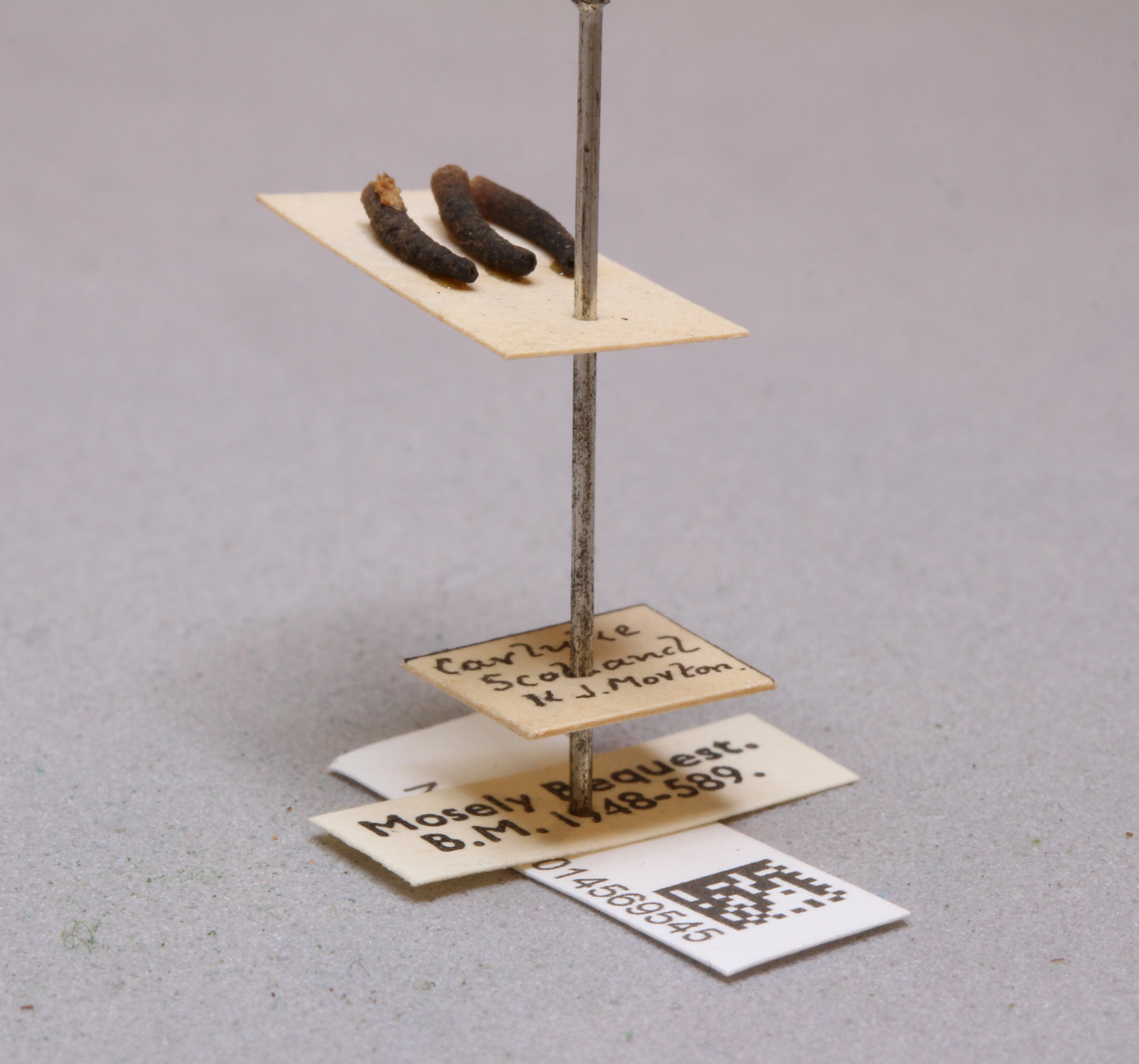
specimens of tubes made by the caddisfly species Beraeodes minutus (Linnaeus, 1761) collected at Carluke by Kenneth J Morton (NHMUK014569545)

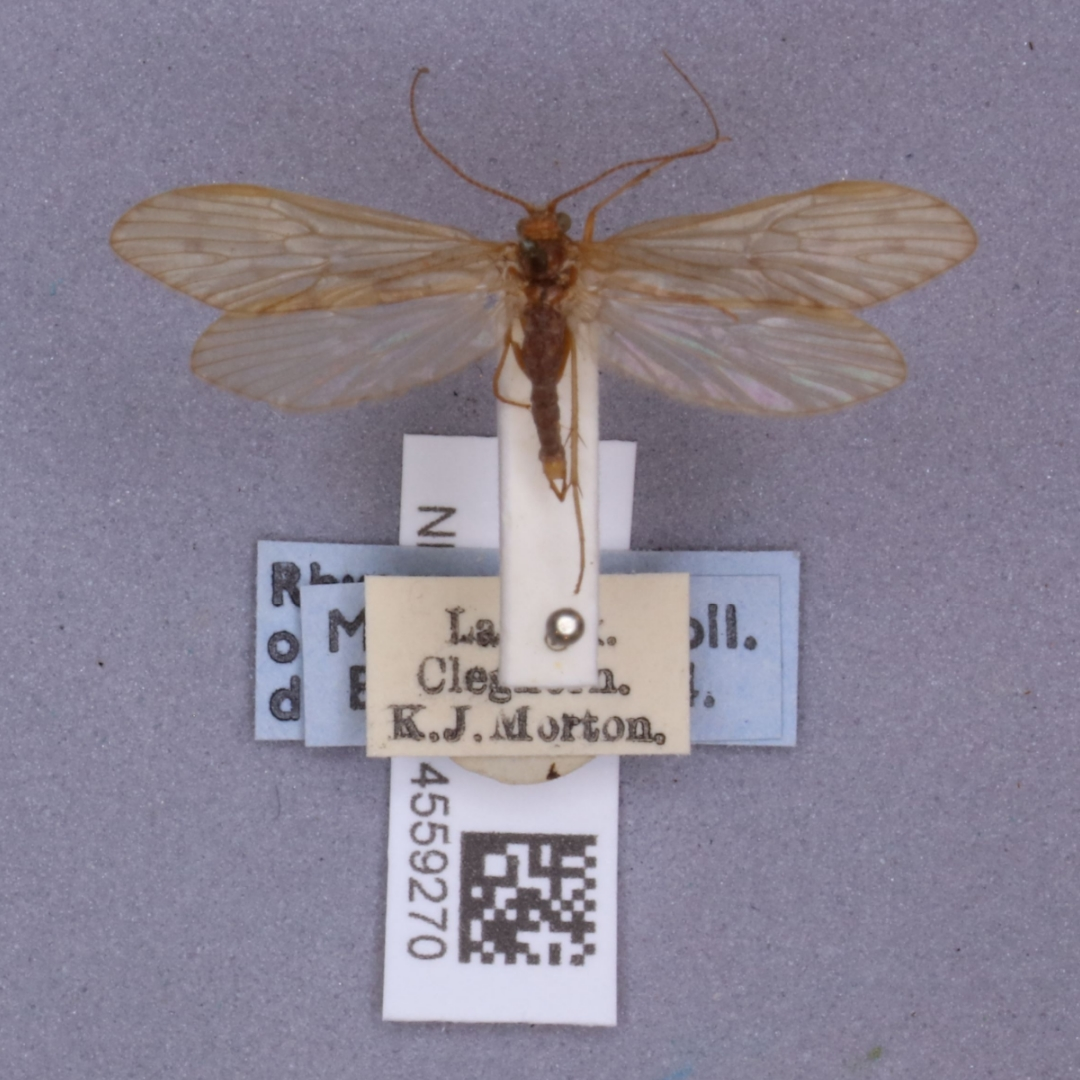
a specimen of the caddisfly species Rhyacophila obliterata McLachlan, 1863 collected at Cleghorn, South Lanarkshire, Scotland by Kenneth J Morton (NHMUK014559270)

Morton became known as an authority in Trichoptera, particularly the family Hydroptilidae, and entomologist Robert McLachlan noted in 1902 that Morton was a reliable person to consult once his own worsening eyesight had affected his work: "Mr Morton has kindly given me the benefit of his good eyes by examining the materials in this family."

Many of Morton's collecting localities were in Scotland: in one paper he commented on the relative increase in smoke pollution when he had needed to move himself for a period in 1896 from Carluke to Uddingston (where his wife Agnes's family came from), and how this had influenced which insects he was able to find, however despite his assumption that the river Clyde would have picked up more impurities further along its route, he found that Trichoptera were still plentiful.

On 22 February 1893 Morton was elected a Fellow of the Entomological Society of London.

== Death and legacy ==
Morton died at his home at Blackford Road, Edinburgh, on 29 January 1940. Morton and his wife Agnes, who died in 1943, are laid to rest together in a Freeland family plot at Old Carluke Cemetery in South Lanarkshire.

Morton's entomological collections were bequeathed to the Royal Scottish Museum (precursor to the National Museum of Scotland), where they were later curated by Andrew Rodger Waterston (1912-1996). Some of Morton's specimens are also in the collection of the Natural History Museum, London: these are specimens which were originally sent by Morton to other entomologists like Robert McLachlan or Martin Mosely (e.g. Rhyacophila septentrionis McLachlan, 1865 from Carluke NHMUK014557136, Rhyacophila obliterata McLachlan, 1863 from Cleghorn NHMUK014559270, Hydroptila vectis Curtis, 1834 from Carluke NHMUK014559879) and tubes of Beraeodes minutus (Linnaeus, 1761) from Carluke NHMUK014569545.

== Selected works ==
- 1882: Voluntary submergence by the female of Phryganea: The Entomologist's Monthly Magazine: Volume 19: July 1882, pg 28
- 1883: Occurrence of Oecetis furva, Ramb., and other Trichoptera in Co. Monaghan, Ireland: The Entomologist's Monthly Magazine: Volume 20: November 1883: pg 142
- 1883: Note on the development of Phryganea striata: The Entomologist's Monthly Magazine: Volume 20: December 1883, pg 168
- 1884: On the Larva, &c., of Beraeodes minuta, Linné: The Entomologist's Monthly Magazine: Volume 21: July 1884, pgs 27-29
- 1884: Notes on the Larva, &c., of Asynarchus coenosus, Curt.: The Entomologist's Monthly Magazine: Volume 21: November 1884, pgs 125-126
- 1886: On the Case, &c., of Agraylea multipunctata, Curt. (=Hydroptila flabellifera, Bremi): The Entomologist's Monthly Magazine: Volume 22: May 1886, pgs 269-272
- 1887: Apatania fimbriata, Pict., a caddis-fly new to the British Isles: The Entomologist's Monthly Magazine: Volume 23: October 1887: pg 118
- 1887: Another Caddis-fly new to the British Isles: Tinodes maculicornis, Pict.: The Entomologist's Monthly Magazine: Volume 24: November 1887: pg 136
- 1888: The larva and case of Ithytrichia lamellaris, Eaton, with references to other species of Hydroptildae: The Entomologist's Monthly Magazine: Volume 24: January 1888, pgs 171-173
- 1888: The larva, &c., of Philopotamus: The Entomologist's Monthly Magazine: Volume 25: September 1888, pgs 89-91
- 1889: (With James Joseph Francis Xavier King): Aeschna borealis, Zett. at Rannoch: The Entomologist's Monthly Magazine: Volume 25: September 1889, pg 383
- 1890: Notes on the metamorphoses of two species of the genus Tinodes: The Entomologist's Monthly Magazine: Volume 26: February 1890, pgs 38-42 [followed by a short correction, in March 1890]
- 1890: Notes on the metamorphoses of British Leptoceridae (No. 2): Section of Odontocerum: II: Odontocerum albicorne, Scop.: The Entomologist's Monthly Magazine: Volume 26: July 1890: pgs 181-184
- 1890: Notes on the metamorphoses of British Leptoceridae (No. 3): Section of Beraea: The Entomologist's Monthly Magazine: Volume 26: September 1890: pgs 231-236
- 1892: Hydroptila maclachlani, Klapálek, a caddis fly new to Britain: The Entomologist's Monthly Magazine: Volume 28: April 1892: pg 108
- 1892: Notes on Trichoptera and Neuroptera from Ireland: The Entomologist's Monthly Magazine: Volume 28: December 1892: pg 301
- 1893: Notes on Hydroptilidae belonging to the European Fauna, with descriptions of new species: Transactions of the Entomological Society of London: 1893: pgs 75-82
- 1894: Palaearctic Nemourae: Transactions of the Entomological Society of London: 1894: pgs 557-574
- 1895: Neuroptera observed in Glen Lochay: The Entomologist's Monthly Magazine: Volume 31: November 1895: pgs 260-263
- 1896: New and little-known Palaearctic Perlidae: Transactions of the Entomological Society of London: 1896: pgs 55-63
- 1896: Allotrichia pallicornis, Eaton, and other Trichoptera from Clydesdale: The Entomologist's Monthly Magazine: Volume 32: October 1896: pgs 231-232
- 1897: Lepidoptera observed in Glen Lochay: The Entomologist's Monthly Magazine: Volume 33: January 1897: pgs 1-4
- 1899: Neuroptera and Trichoptera observed in Wigtownshire during July, 1899, including two species of Hydroptilidae new to the British List: The Entomologist's Monthly Magazine: Volume 35: December 1899: pgs 278-281
- 1900: Some old Records of the Occurrence of certain Dragon-flies in Scotland: The Entomologist's Monthly Magazine: Volume 36: May 1900: pgs 108-110
- 1900: Descriptions of new species of Oriental Rhyacophilae: Transactions of the Entomological Society of London: 1900: pgs 1-7
- 1901: Trichoptera, Neuroptera-Plannipennia, Odonata and Rhophalocera collected in Norway in the summer of 1900: The Entomologist's Monthly Magazine: Volume 37: January 1901: pgs 24-33
- 1902: Trichoptera, Plannipennia and Pseudo-Neuroptera collected in North Wales in July, 1901: The Entomologist's Monthly Magazine: Volume 38: February 1902: pgs 34-36
- 1904: Neuroptera and Trichoptera observed in the Lake District: The Entomologist's Monthly Magazine: Volume 40: pgs 52-54
- 1904: Further notes on Hydroptilidae belonging to the European Fauna, with descriptions of new species: Transactions of the Entomological Society of London: 1904: pgs 323-328
- 1905: Dragon-fly hunting in eastern Switzerland: The Entomologist's Monthly Magazine: Volume 41: January 1905: pgs 1-4
- 1905: Dragon-fly hunting in eastern Switzerland (continued from page 4): The Entomologist's Monthly Magazine: Volume 41: February 1905: pgs 33-36
- 1908: Butterflies and Neuroptera in Perthshire: The Entomologist's Monthly Magazine: Volume 44: July 1908: pgs 149-151
- 1915: Some Palaearctic species of Cordulegaster: Transactions of the Entomological Society of London: 1915: pgs 273-290
