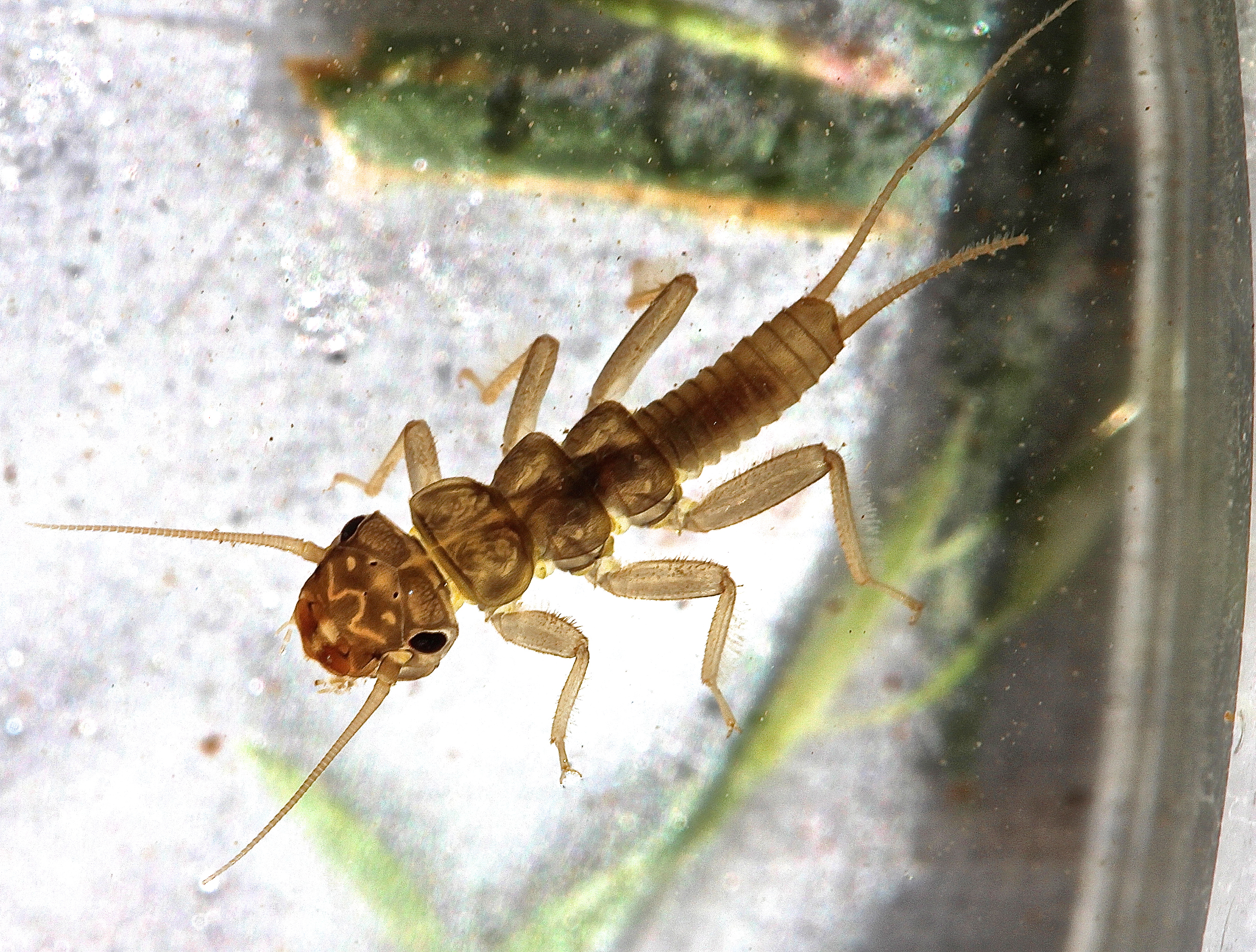

Scientific classification
- Domain: Eukaryota
- Kingdom: Animalia
- Phylum: Arthropoda
- Class: Insecta
- Order: Plecoptera
- Family: Perlodidae
- Genus: Malirekus
- Species: M. hastatus

Binomial name
- Malirekus hastatus (Banks, 1920)

Synonyms
- Isogenus hastatus Banks, 1920

= Malirekus hastatus =

Species of stonefly

Malirekus hastatus, the brook springfly, is a species of springfly in the family Perlodidae. It is found in North America.
