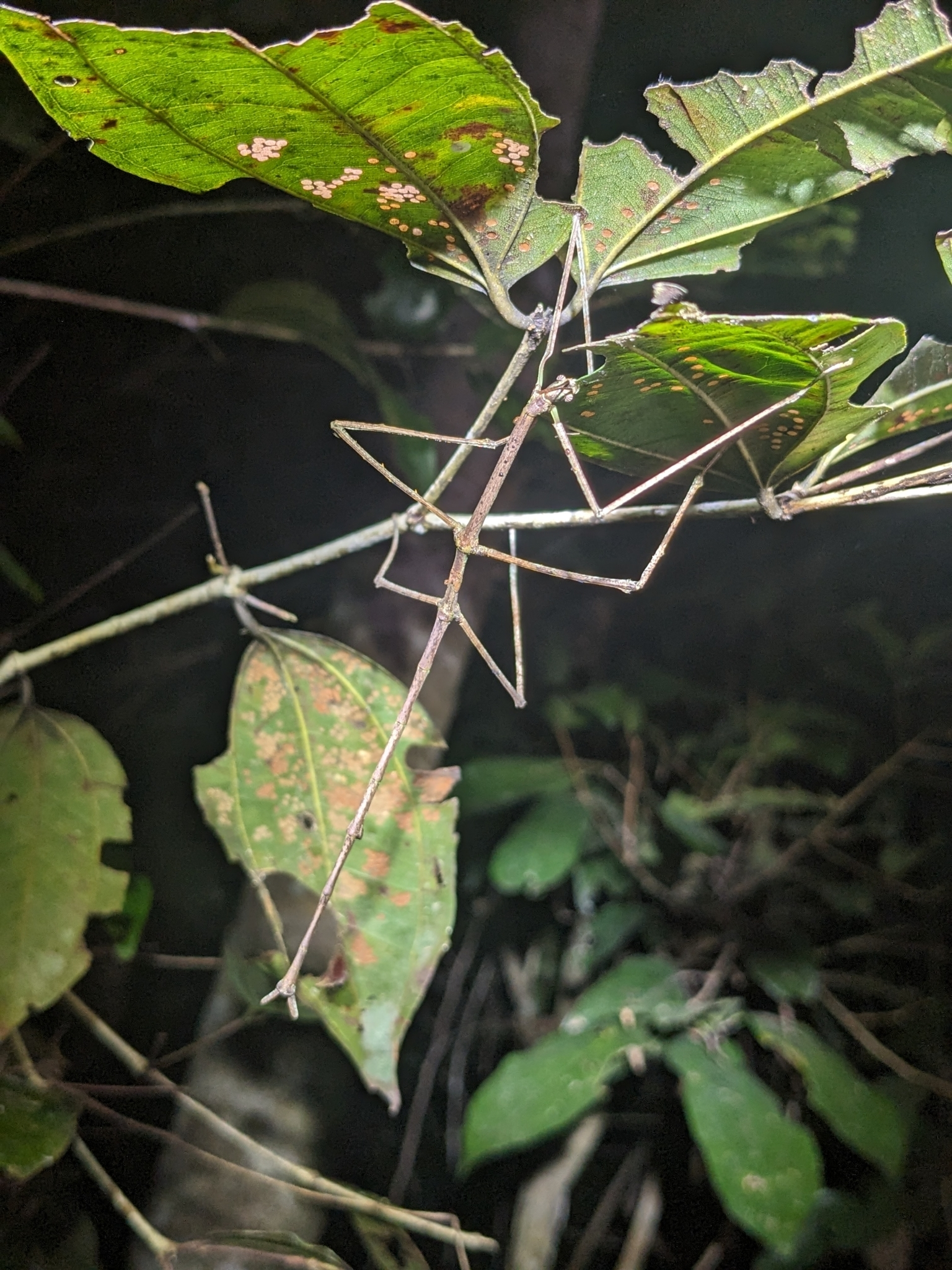

Conservation status
- Near Threatened (IUCN 3.1)

Scientific classification
- Kingdom: Animalia
- Phylum: Arthropoda
- Clade: Pancrustacea
- Class: Insecta
- Order: Phasmatodea
- Family: Phasmatidae
- Genus: Ctenomorpha
- Species: C. gargantua

Binomial name
- Ctenomorpha gargantua Hasenpusch & Brock, 2006

= Ctenomorpha gargantua =

Species of stick insect

Ctenomorpha gargantua, the gargantuan stick insect, is a species of stick insect that is endemic to rainforests in northeastern Queensland, Australia. It is Australia's longest stick insect and among the world's longest stick insects, with females having been confirmed at up to 56.5 cm (22.2 in) in total length, including extended legs and cerci (protrusions from the end of their body, which are unusually long in this species), but they can likely grow even larger, as there are unconfirmed measurements of up to 61.5 cm (24.2 in). Both sexes are brown, but males only reach about two-thirds the length of females and they are also thinner.

Males can fly and actively seek females, whereas the flightless females are believed to live inconspicuously high in the rainforest canopy; only a few females have ever been found in the wild. If no male is present, a female can breed alone via parthenogenesis. The eggs, which resemble small plant seeds, are dropped onto the ground from the canopy by the female, with the young making their way back to the canopy after hatching. A captive breeding program is run by Museum Victoria, and the species is also maintained by hobbyist stick insect keepers. Their wild food plants are unknown, but captives will feed on Eucalyptus, Syzygium australe and Corymbia torelliana.

== See also ==
- List of largest insects
