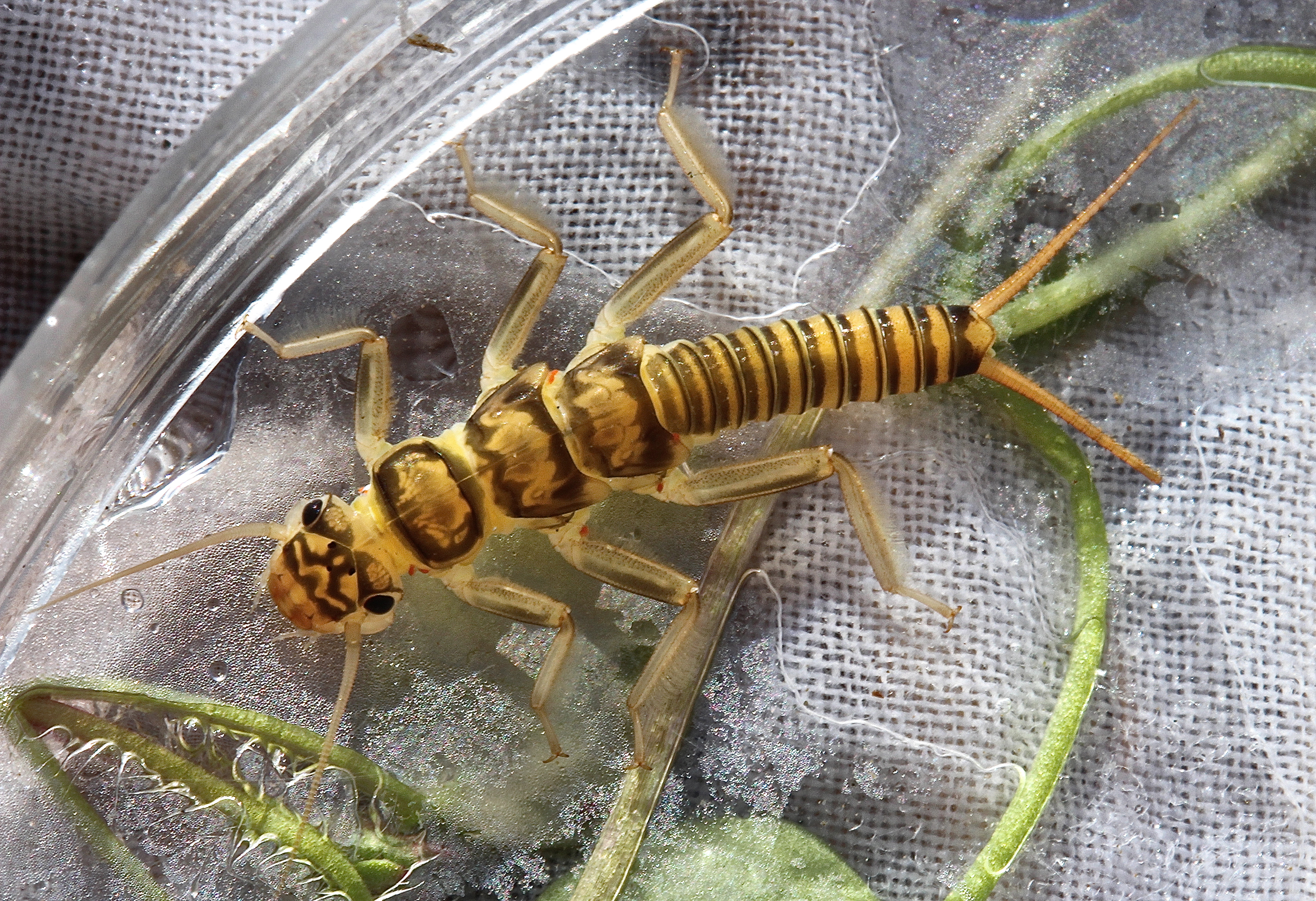

Scientific classification
- Domain: Eukaryota
- Kingdom: Animalia
- Phylum: Arthropoda
- Class: Insecta
- Order: Plecoptera
- Family: Perlodidae
- Genus: Isogenoides
- Species: I. hansoni

Binomial name
- Isogenoides hansoni (Ricker, 1952)

= Isogenoides hansoni =

Species of stonefly

Isogenoides hansoni, the Appalachian springfly, is a species of springfly in the family Perlodidae. It is found in North America.

== Communication ==
It seems that, like other species of the Isogenoides genus, the Isogenoides hansoni can communicate with vibrational 'drumming'.
