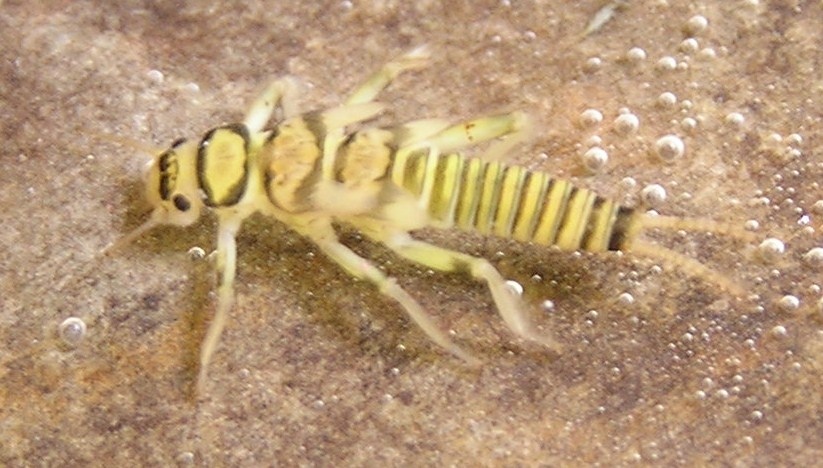
- Helopicus subvarians

Scientific classification
- Domain: Eukaryota
- Kingdom: Animalia
- Phylum: Arthropoda
- Class: Insecta
- Order: Plecoptera
- Family: Perlodidae
- Subfamily: Perlodinae
- Tribe: Perlodini; Klapálek, 1909

= Perlodini =

Tribe of stoneflies

Perlodini is a tribe of Palaearctic and Nearctic stoneflies in the family Perlodidae. There are more than 80 described species in Perlodini.

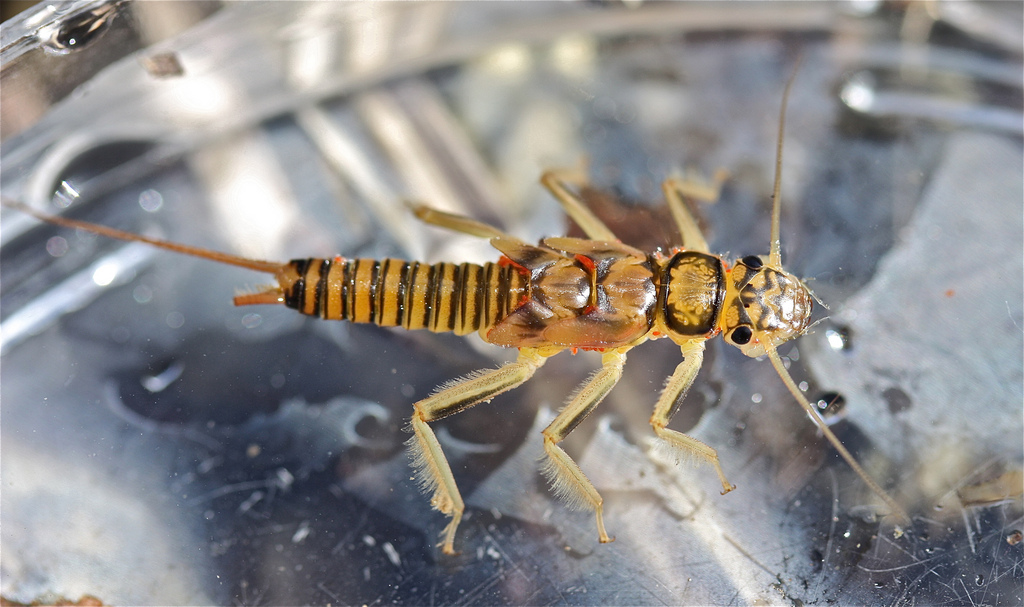
Yugus

== Genera ==
The Plecoptera Species File lists:

1. Besdolus Ricker, 1952
2. Chernokrilus Ricker, 1952
3. Dictyogenus Klapálek, 1904
4. Diura Billberg, 1820
5. Filchneria Klapálek, 1908
6. Guadalgenus Stark & Gonzalez del Tanago, 1986
7. Hedinia (stonefly) Navás, 1936
8. Helopicus Ricker, 1952
9. Hydroperla Frison, 1935
10. Isogenoides Klapálek, 1912
11. Isogenus Newman, 1833
12. Levanidovia Teslenko & Zhiltzova, 1989
13. Malirekus Ricker, 1952
14. Megaperlodes Yokoyama, Isobe & Yamamoto, 1990
15. Oconoperla Stark & Stewart, 1982
16. Perlodes Banks, 1903
17. Perlodinella Klapálek, 1912
18. Protarcys Klapálek, 1912
19. Susulus Bottorff, Stewart & Knight, 1989
20. Tadamus Ricker, 1952
21. Yugus Ricker, 1952
22. Zhiltzovaia Özdikmen, 2008
