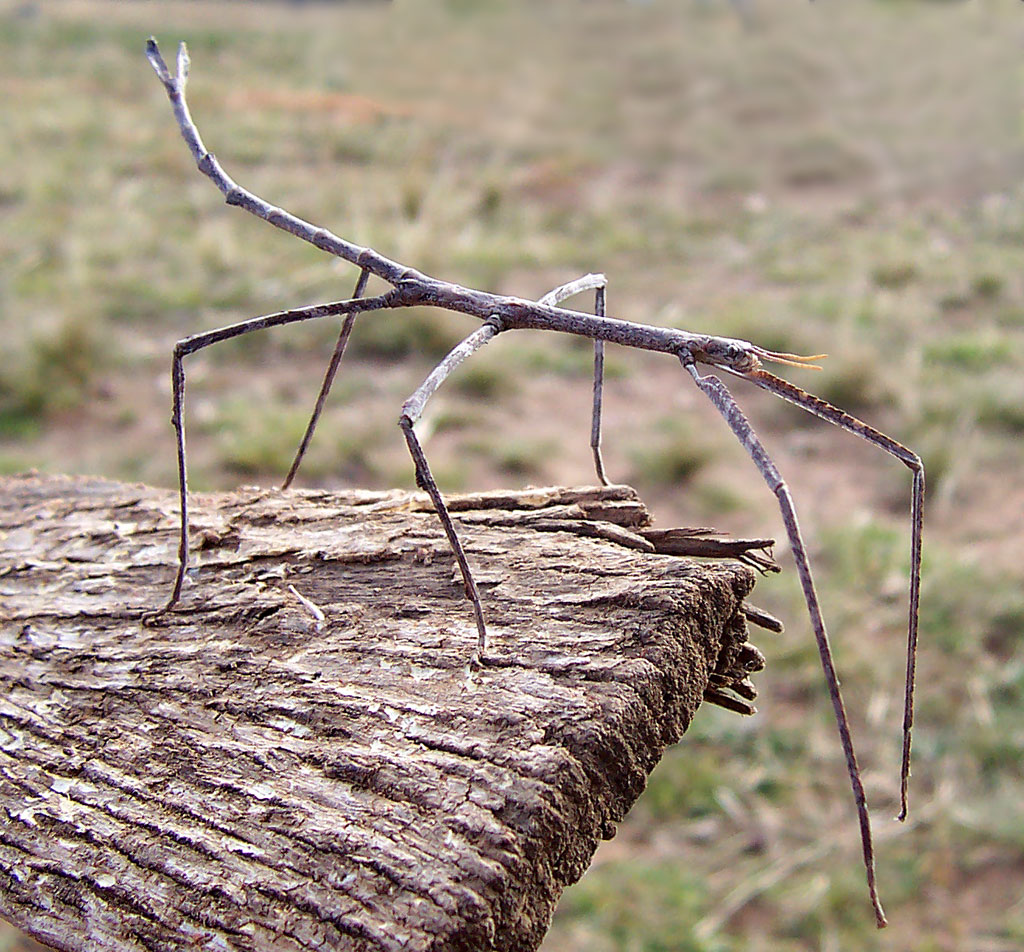
- Ctenomorpha marginipennis

Scientific classification
- Kingdom: Animalia
- Phylum: Arthropoda
- Class: Insecta
- Order: Phasmatodea
- Family: Phasmatidae
- Subfamily: Phasmatinae
- Tribe: Phasmatini
- Genus: Ctenomorpha; Gray, 1833

= Ctenomorpha =

Genus of insects

Ctenomorpha is a genus of phasmids belonging to the family Phasmatidae.

The species of this genus are found in Australia.

== Species ==
The Global Biodiversity Information Facility lists:

1. Ctenomorpha gargantua Hasenpusch & Brock, 2006
2. Ctenomorpha marginipennis G.R.Gray, 1833 (several synonyms including C. chronus)
