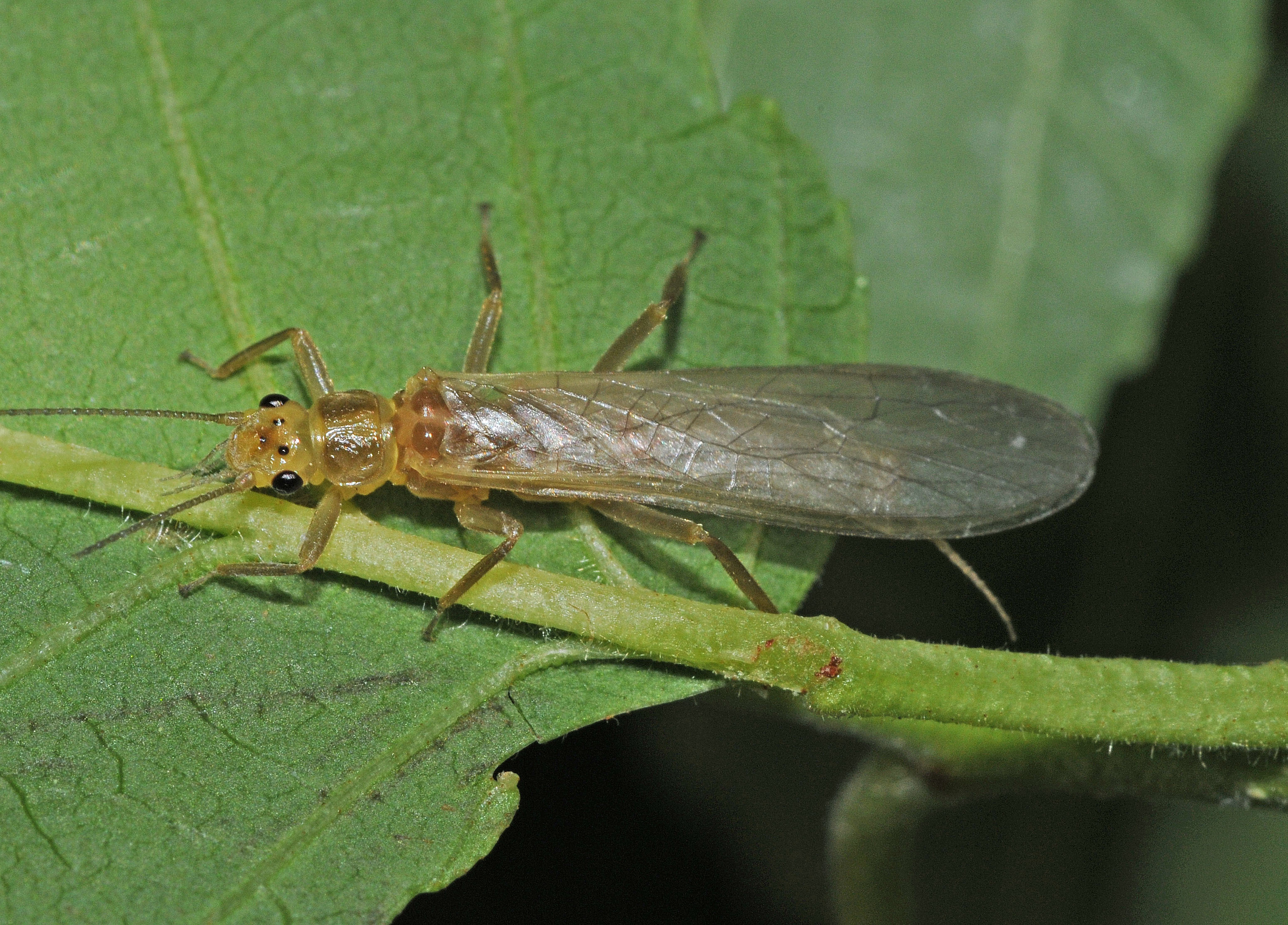
- Osobenus yakimae

Scientific classification
- Domain: Eukaryota
- Kingdom: Animalia
- Phylum: Arthropoda
- Class: Insecta
- Order: Plecoptera
- Family: Perlodidae
- Subfamily: Perlodinae
- Tribe: Diploperlini

= Diploperlini =

Tribe of stoneflies

Diploperlini is a tribe of springflies in the family Perlodidae. There are about 13 genera and more than 30 described species in Diploperlini.

== Genera ==
These 13 genera belong to the tribe Diploperlini:

- Afroperlodes Miron & Zwick, 1973
- Baumannella Stark & Stewart, 1985
- Bulgaroperla Raušer, 1966
- Cultus Ricker, 1952
- Diploperla Needham & Claassen, 1925
- Hemimelaena Klapálek, 1907
- Kogotus Ricker, 1952
- Osobenus Ricker, 1952
- Ostrovus Ricker, 1952
- Pictetiella Illies, 1966
- Remenus Ricker, 1952
- Rickera Jewett, 1954
- Stavsolus Ricker, 1952
