= Cultus (stonefly) =

Scientific classification
- Domain: Eukaryota
- Kingdom: Animalia
- Phylum: Arthropoda
- Class: Insecta
- Order: Plecoptera
- Family: Perlodidae
- Tribe: Diploperlini
- Genus: Cultus; Ricker, 1952

Genus of stoneflies

Cultus is a genus of stoneflies in the family Perlodidae. There are about five described species in Cultus.

== Species ==
These five species belong to the genus Cultus:

- Cultus aestivalis (Needham and Claassen, 1925)^{i c g}
- Cultus decisus (Walker, 1852)^{i c g}
- Cultus pilatus (Frison, 1942)^{i c g}
- Cultus tostonus (Ricker, 1952)^{i c g}
- Cultus verticalis (Banks, 1920)^{i c g b} (spiny springfly)

Data sources: i = ITIS, c = Catalogue of Life, g = GBIF, b = Bugguide.net
