= Susulus =

Scientific classification
- Domain: Eukaryota
- Kingdom: Animalia
- Phylum: Arthropoda
- Class: Insecta
- Order: Plecoptera
- Family: Perlodidae
- Subfamily: Perlodinae
- Genus: Susulus; Bottorff, Stewart & Knight, 1989

Genus of stoneflies

Susulus is a genus of stoneflies from the Perlodidae family.

== Species ==
Susulus includes the following species:

- Susulus venustus (Jewett, 1965)
