= James Joseph Francis Xavier King =

Scottish entomologist, artist, librarian and lecturer (1855–1933)

- Born: 28 August 1855; Glasgow, Scotland
- Died: 5 February 1933 (aged 77); Kelvinside, Glasgow.
- Occupation: Entomologist Artist Teacher Librarian
- Years active: 1872–1930
- Spouse: Jessie Parker Barr

James Joseph Francis Xavier King F.E.S. (1855–1933) was a Scottish entomologist, artist, librarian and lecturer at the Glasgow School of Art and Glasgow and West of Scotland Technical College. In his entomological publications King is sometimes referred to by his initials as J.J.F.X. King, and his pupils at The Glasgow School of Art gave him the nickname 'Alphabetical King.'

== Biography ==
King was born on 28 August 1855 in Burnside Street, Glasgow, Scotland. King's father George and his mother Catherine (née Kennedy) were both originally from Dublin, Ireland.

In 1871, fifteen-year old king was recorded on the Scotland Census as an Architectural Apprentice.

King became a member of the Glasgow Natural History Society in 1872 at the age of sixteen, and served as the Society's Librarian from 1883.

By 1880 King was teaching general classes at the Glasgow School of Art. One of King's pupils in 1884 for elementary classes in draftsmanship and ornamentation was the young Charles Rennie Mackintosh. King was working as Librarian at the School when the new School building by Mackintosh was nearing completion in 1909. In the Autumn of 1909 King filed a complaint that the new library's large oriel windows made it very difficult to heat the room and comfortably work during cold weather, so radiators were added for the comfort of the students.

King exhibited two landscapes at the Glasgow Institute of Fine Arts in 1885 and is recorded as being an active artist between 1885 and 1891.

In 1892 King married Jessie Parker Barr (1864–1933).

In 1896 King's death was erroneously reported in the Dundee Evening Telegraph as having occurred in a hotel at Fochabers on 14 September; King himself wrote to the newspaper to correct them - he had been mistaken for his friend the botanist Thomas King, who had actually died in Fochabers on that date.

King died at Kelvinside, Glasgow, on 5 February 1933.

During his lifetime King had assembled a large collection of British insects (c.500,000 specimens), bird's eggs and natural history books. The bulk of his insect collection was gifted by King to the Hunterian Museum at Glasgow University during his lifetime, and the remaining 10,000 specimens were bequeathed to the university upon his death, along with his oil portrait by David Forrester Wilson (1873–1950). Another oil portrait sketch of King by John Lavery is in the collection of the Glasgow Museums Resource Centre (GMRC).

== Entomological work ==
Many of King's entomological investigations were conducted in Scotland and Ireland.

In 1876 King contributed a list of western Scottish Lepidoptera to Peter Cameron's list of Insects published in On the fauna and flora of the west of Scotland.

In 1878 King collected a male example of the caddisfly species Limnophilus subcentralis at Aviemore, Inverness-shire, which was the first time that the species had been recorded in the British Isles.

On 27 July 1885 while on his summer holiday and travelling through Glen Tromie near Kingussie, King encountered a cloud of caddisflies of the species Hydropsyche instabilis which he calculated was about five miles in extent, and was dense enough with individuals for King to collect 50–60 insects with one sweep of his insect net. King returned a few days later and found none of the caddisflies remained in the area, and he attributed the phenomenon to changes in the weather.

In August 1887 King was at Killarney, Ireland and spent time visiting lakes to collect freshwater insects, part of the time working with Kenneth J Morton.

At the beginning of 1895 King spent ten weeks at Unst, Shetland, in the company of Percy Bright and William Reid. All three men were searching for Shetland Lepidoptera, but King also collected Trichoptera specimens.

== Select publications ==
1886: Notes on the Neuroptera of Rothiemurchus and Kingussie. Proceedings and Transactions of the Natural History Society of Glasgow, pp 354–365

1891: (with Kenneth J Morton): List of Neuroptera Observed at Rannoch in June, 1889. The Entomologist's Monthly Magazine, February 1891, volume 27, pp 45–47

1896: (with Percy Bright and William Reid): Ten Weeks Collecting Lepidoptera in Unst (Shetland): The Entomologist's Monthly Magazine, January 1896, volume 32, pp 5–9

1896: Notes on Trichoptera (Including Agrypnia picta, Kol.) Taken in Unst, Shetland, 1895. The Entomologist's Monthly Magazine, July 1896, volume 32, pp 151–152

1910: (with James Nathaniel Halbert): A List of the Neuroptera of Ireland. Proceedings of the Royal Irish Academy Section B: Biological, Geological, and Chemical Science, volume 28 (1908–1910) pp 29–112
