= Martin Ephraim Mosely =

English entomologist (1877–1948)

Martin Ephraim Mosely (6 August 1877 - 30 August 1948) was an English entomologist who specialized in the systematics of caddisflies (Trichoptera). His interest in freshwater insects was first triggered by his interest in fishing. He was also a well-known angler and fly-fisherman and contributed to the works of Frederic M. Halford, a friend and distant relative.

Mosely was born in Newcastle upon Tyne to Alfred Isaiah Mosely who came from a well-known Jewish family of dentists. His grandfather, Ephraim Mosely (1807-1873) held practice in Grosvenor Square and was the author of Teeth, their natural history: with the physiology of the human mouth, in regard to artificial teeth (1862). His father died when he was just aged two and was raised by his mother Malvina Marian (née Schlesinger) and her older sister who had moved to live in Hampstead, London. By 1901 the family moved to Kensington and Martin began to work as a bank clerk for a while and took an interest in fishing, possibly through Frederic M. Halford (1844-1914). They fished together at Mottisfont in Hampshire. Mosely joined the Fly Fishers' Club in 1905 where he also joined Hugh G. Franks on fishing trips. Mosely however gave up active fishing around 1912, possibly due to an accident in which he nearly drowned. Mosely was briefly involved with a natural fly committee which was interested in the study of insects. Halford had collected a fair number and he donated his cabinets to the Club and Mosely later described the specimens and added to the collection. Mosely helped edit the journal of the club from 1911 to 1931. Mosely was admitted as a Fellow of the Entomological Society of London in 1910, proposed by Malcolm Burr and seconded by Kenneth J. Morton.

Following Halford's death in 1914, he saw the need for a guide to freshwater insects. He began to work on it but was interrupted by World War I. Mosely volunteered with the East Surrey Regiment and then the Royal Fusiliers. After the war, the book plan was hindered by high costs and the lack of an artist to produce the plates. Mosely retired from the bank in 1929 and joined the British Museum as honorary scientist. He also made collection trips to Europe and worked at the museum for the next two decades, examining the Trichoptera collections there. He then collaborated with Douglas E. Kimmins (1905-1985) who illustrated his works (signed just with "K"). Mosely would later work on the massive collections of Robert McLachlan (1837-1904) which were acquired by the British Museum in 1938. Mosely also collaborated with Norman E. Hickin (1910-1990) to study the immature stages of caddisflies. His outdoor activities were reduced in 1934 following phlebitis which prevented him from standing for long periods. Mosely died a day after suffering from a heart attack in August 1948 aged 71. He was unmarried and left his estate worth over to his niece Kate Margaret Yates (1910-1991). He donated his collections and manuscripts to the British Museum.

== Publications ==
A selected list of Mosely's works include:

- Betten, C. & M.E. Mosely(1940): The Francis Walker Types of Trichoptera in the British Museum. British Museum (Natural History), London: x + 248pp.
- Mosely, M.E. (1921): The Dry-Fly Fisherman's Entomology. Routledge & Sons, London: 109pp.
- Mosely, M.E. (1923): Scent-organs in the genus Hydroptila (Trichoptera). Transactions of the Entomological Society of London 1923: 291-294, 2 pls.
- Mosely, M.E. (1926): Insect Life and the Management of a Trout Fishery. Routledge & Sons, London: xii + 112pp.
- Mosely, M.E. (1930a): Ronalds’ collection and the "Fly-fisher’s Entomology". Entomologist's Monthly Magazine 66: 116-123.
- Mosely, M.E. (1930b): Irish Trichoptera, Neuroptera, etc. The Entomologist 63: 30-34.
- Mosely, M.E. (1933): A collecting-trip in Switzerland. Annals and Magazine of Natural History (10) 11: 87-96.
- Mosely, M.E. (1937): Mayflies: a consideration of anglers’ and entomologists’ claims to a popular name. Salmon and Trout Magazine 88: 220-228.
- Mosely, M.E. (1939): The British Caddis Flies (Trichoptera): a collector's handbook. Routledge & Sons, London: xiv + 320pp.
- Mosely, M.E. (1943): The preparation of insects for the microscope; with special reference to the Trichoptera. The Entomologist 76: 227-234; 241-251.
- Mosely, M.E & D.E. Kimmins (1953): The Trichoptera (Caddis Flies) of Australia and New Zealand. British Museum (Natural History), London: 550pp.
