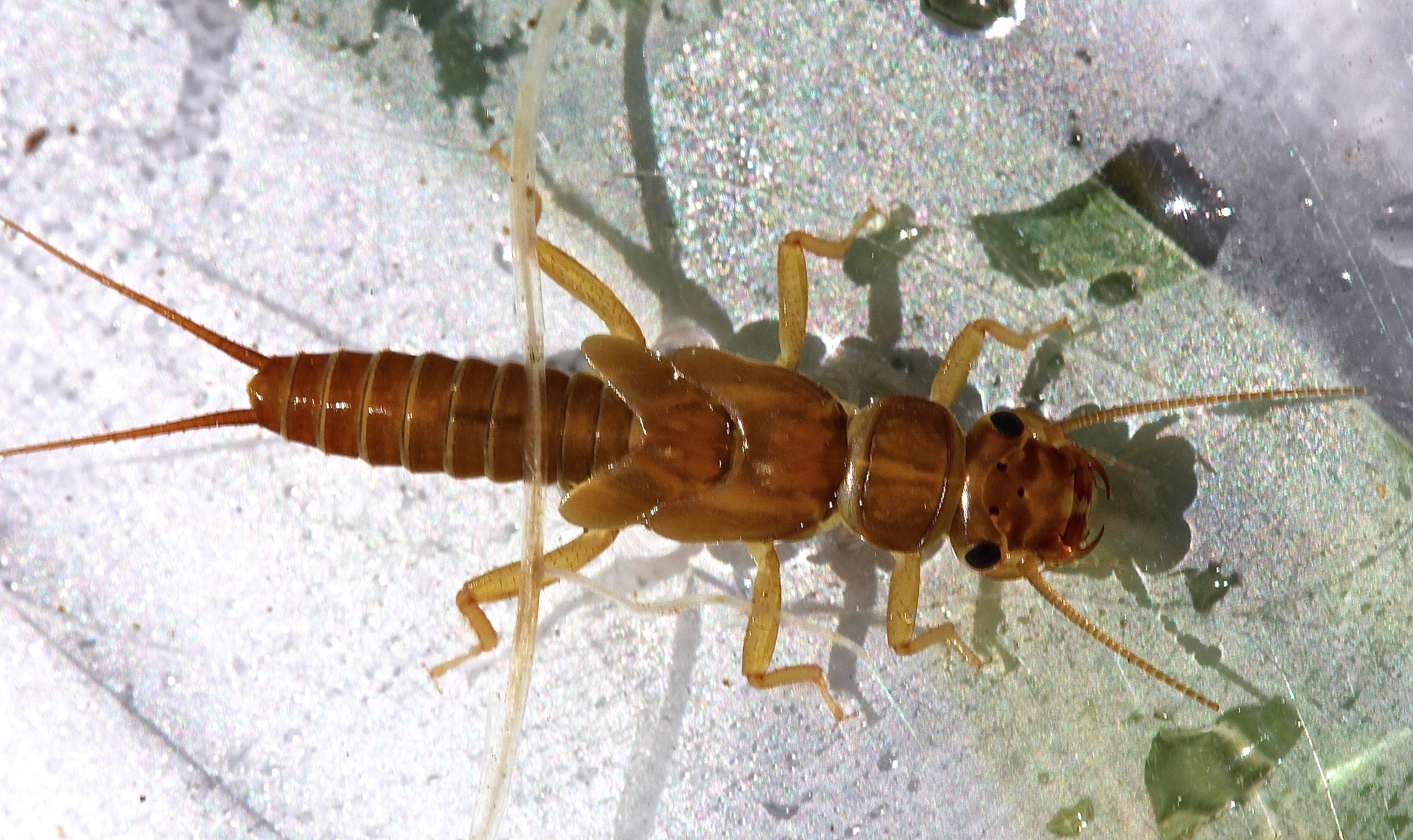
- Diploperla duplicata

Scientific classification
- Domain: Eukaryota
- Kingdom: Animalia
- Phylum: Arthropoda
- Class: Insecta
- Order: Plecoptera
- Family: Perlodidae
- Tribe: Diploperlini
- Genus: Diploperla; Needham & Claassen, 1925

= Diploperla =

Genus of insects

Diploperla is a genus of springflies in the family Perlodidae.

== Species ==
These five species belong to the genus Diploperla:

- Diploperla duplicata (Banks, 1920) (two-lobed springfly)
- Diploperla janeae Kondratieff & Verdone, 2017
- Diploperla kanawholensis Kirchner & Kondratieff, 1984
- Diploperla morgani Kondratieff & Voshell, 1979
- Diploperla robusta Stark & Gaufin, 1974
