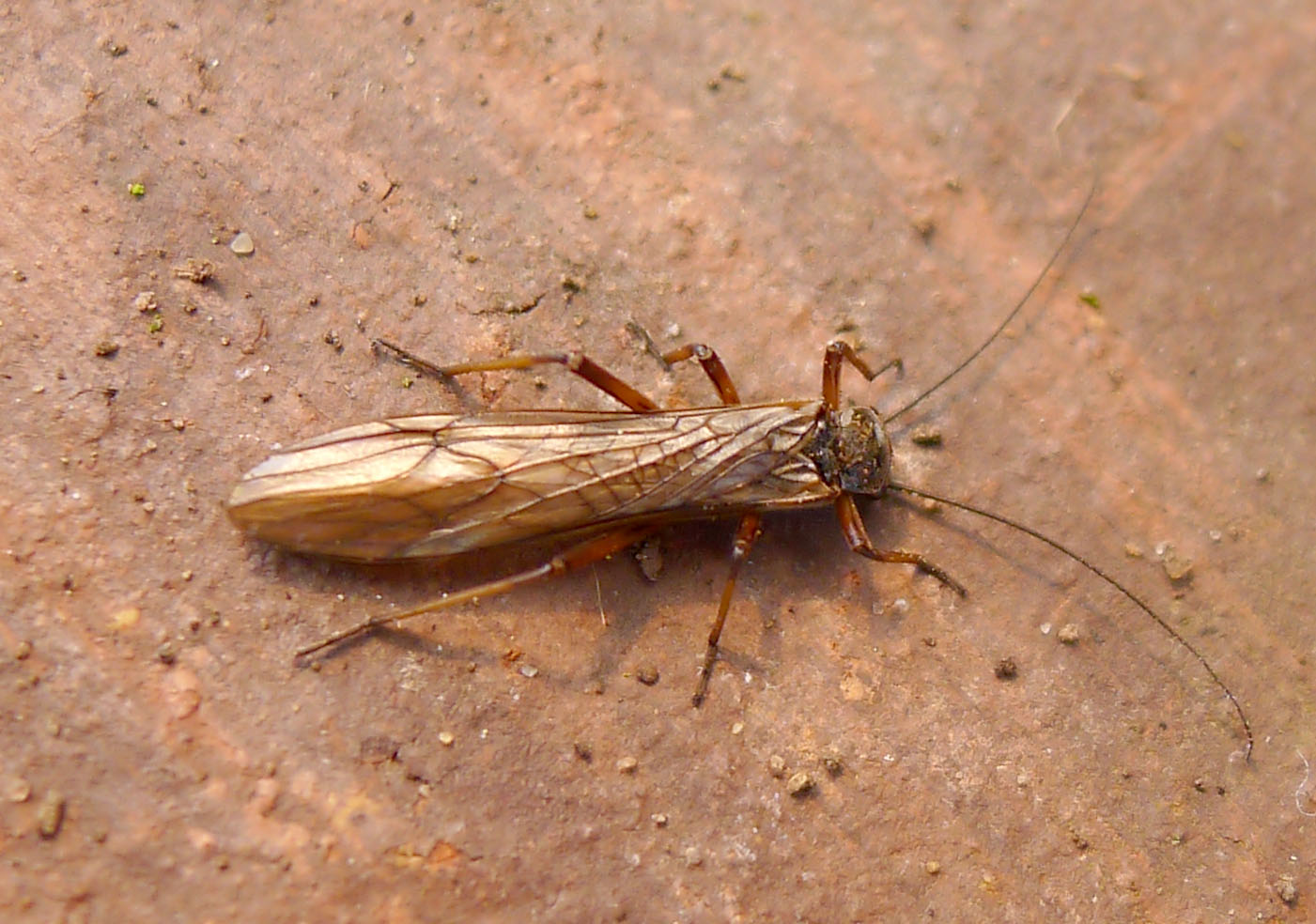
- Perlodes mortoni

Scientific classification
- Domain: Eukaryota
- Kingdom: Animalia
- Phylum: Arthropoda
- Class: Insecta
- Order: Plecoptera
- Family: Perlodidae
- Genus: Perlodes; Banks, 1903

= Perlodes =

Genus of stoneflies

Perlodes is a genus of insects belonging to the family Perlodidae.

The species of this genus are found in Eurasia; P. mortoni is endemic to Britain.

== Species ==
GBIF includes the following:

1. Perlodes dispar (Rambur, 1842)
2. Perlodes floridus Kovács & Vinçon, 2012
3. Perlodes frisonanus Kohno, 1943
4. Perlodes infumata (McLachlan, 1869)
5. Perlodes intricatus (Pictet, 1841)
6. Perlodes jurassicus Aubert, 1946
7. Perlodes kippenhani Stark, 2010
8. Perlodes lobata Wu & Claassen, 1934
9. Perlodes microcephalus (Pictet, 1833)
10. Perlodes mortoni (Klapálek, 1906)
11. Perlodes norvegica (Kempny, 1900)
12. Perlodes resinata (Hagen, 1856)
13. Perlodes sinensis Navás, 1933
14. Perlodes stigmata Ra, Kim, Kang & Ham, 1994
15. Perlodes succinica (Hagen, 1856)
16. Perlodes thomasi Vinçon, Dia & Kovács, 2013
17. Perlodes truncata Wu & Claassen, 1934
