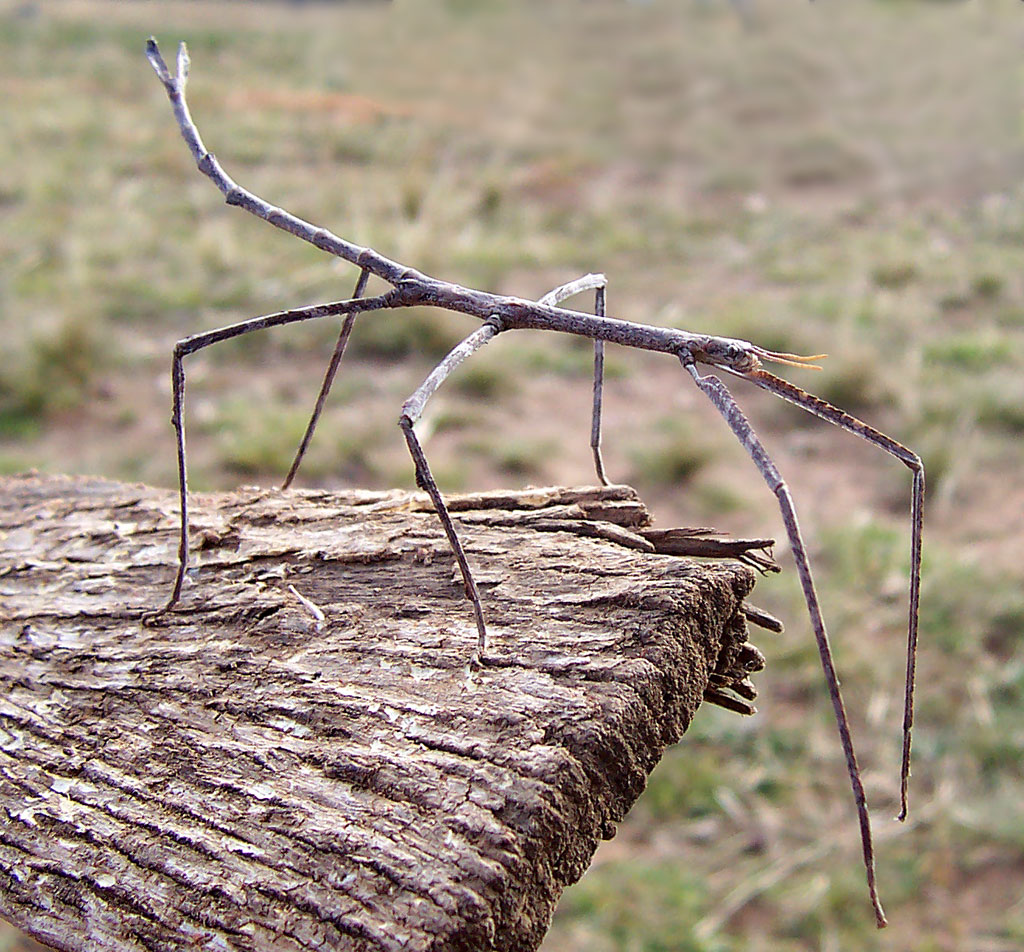

Scientific classification
- Kingdom: Animalia
- Phylum: Arthropoda
- Class: Insecta
- Order: Phasmatodea
- Family: Phasmatidae
- Genus: Ctenomorpha
- Species: C. marginipennis

Binomial name
- Ctenomorpha marginipennis Gray, 1833

Synonyms
- Ctenomorphoda marginipennis Gray, 1833; Acrophylla chronus Kaup, 1871; Acrophylla scutigera Redtenbacher, 1908; Acrophylla tasmanensis Lea, 1902; Ctenomorphodes chronus Gray, 1833; Ctenomorpha marginipenne Gray, 1833; Ctenomorpha oxyacantha Redtenbacher, 1908; Ctenomorpha phyllocerca Redtenbacher, 1908; Diura chronus Gray, 1833; Lopaphus macrotegmus Tepper, 1887

= Ctenomorpha marginipennis =

Species of stick insect

Ctenomorpha marginipennis, the margin-winged stick insect, is a species of stick insect endemic to southern Australia. The species was first described by George Robert Gray in 1833, then placed in the genus Didymuria by Kirby in 1904. It was subsequently accepted as "Ctenomorpha chronus (Gray, 1833)".

== Description ==
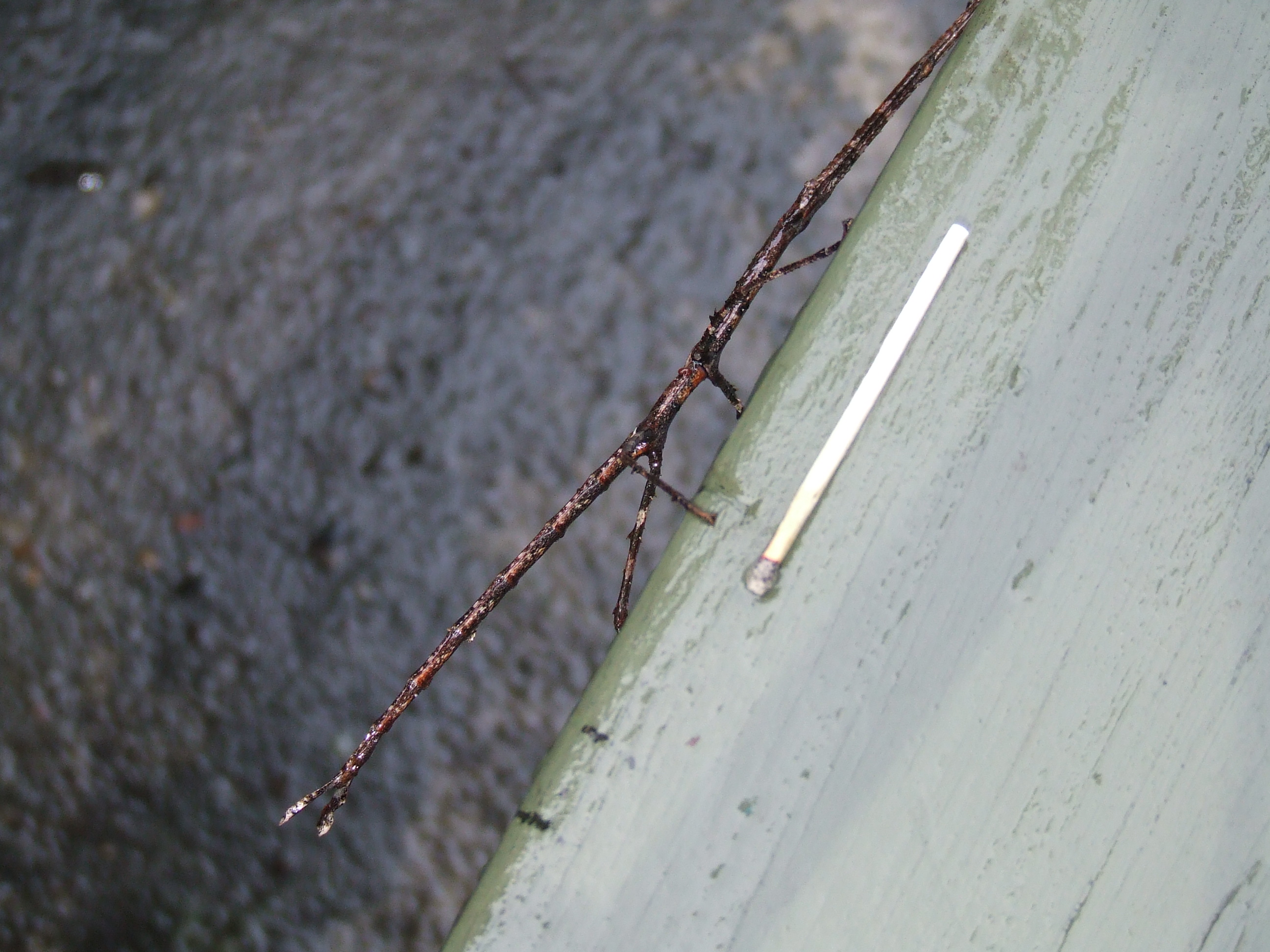
Ctenomorpha marginipennis next to matchstick to show scale

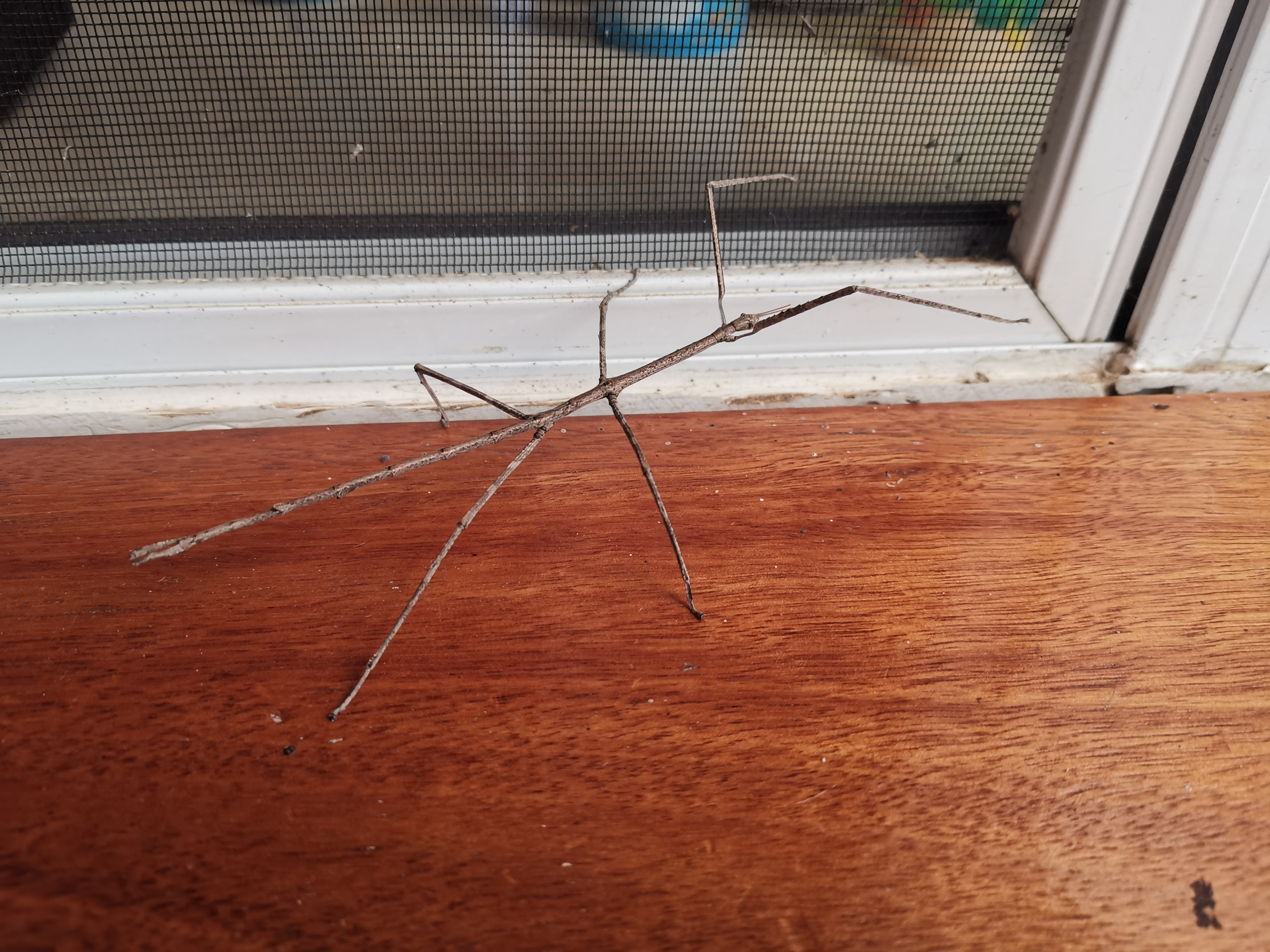
Ctenomorpha marginipennis Stick Insect (Sydney)

C. marginipennis resembles a eucalyptus twig and can grow up to 20 cm in length. The males are long and slender, have full wings and can fly. The females are larger with blackish hindwings. The wings of the females are smaller than those of the males. The legs and head (prothorax) are light pinkish brown, with the legs being dentated. The mesothorax, tegmina, abdomen and leaflets, are all blackish green. The mesothorax may have small tubercles. The abdomen contains numerous small spots. The cerci are extremely long and may be somewhat dentated. The nymphs are similar to the older stage, but with only small wing buds instead of the full-length wings of the adults. This species can be distinguished from other members of the family by their extremely long cerci and by the appearance of their eggs.

== Distribution and habitat ==
This species is quite common in heaths and woodlands from southern Queensland south to Victoria, but prefers coastal environments.

== Reproduction ==
The female lays 3 mm elliptical eggs that look like plant seeds. Like most phasmids, C. marginipennis flicks its eggs on the soil, where a little knob called the capitullum attracts ants to carry them to the ant refinery, where they hatch. This species is parthenogenetic.

== Ecology ==
Ctenomorpha marginipennis feeds on leaves from the eucalyptus tree as well as other tree species. It is a twig mimic, its body shape and colouration making it well camouflaged among eucalyptus twigs.

== See also ==
- Phasmatodea
