= Skwala curvata =

Scientific classification
- Domain: Eukaryota
- Kingdom: Animalia
- Phylum: Arthropoda
- Class: Insecta
- Order: Plecoptera
- Family: Perlodidae
- Tribe: Arcynopterygini
- Genus: Skwala
- Species: S. curvata

Binomial name
- Skwala curvata (Hanson, 1942)

Species of stonefly

Skwala curvata, the curved springfly, is a species of springfly in the family Perlodidae. It is found in North America.
