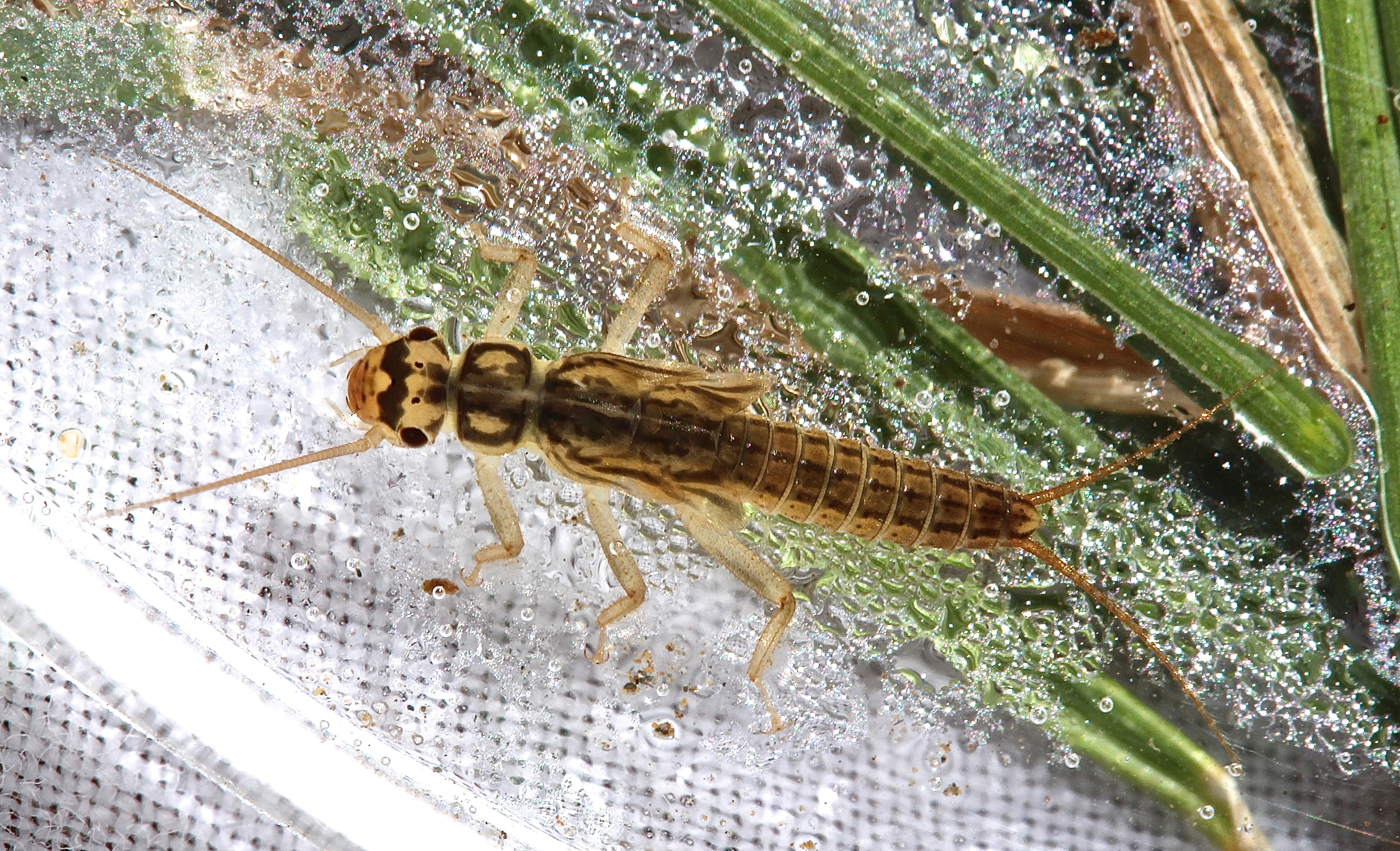

Scientific classification
- Domain: Eukaryota
- Kingdom: Animalia
- Phylum: Arthropoda
- Class: Insecta
- Order: Plecoptera
- Family: Perlodidae
- Genus: Isoperla
- Species: I. montana

Binomial name
- Isoperla montana (Banks, 1898)

= Isoperla montana =

Species of stonefly

Isoperla montana is a species in the subfamily Isoperlinae ("green-winged stoneflies"), in the order Plecoptera ("stoneflies"). The species is known generally as the "montane stripetail". It is found in North America.
