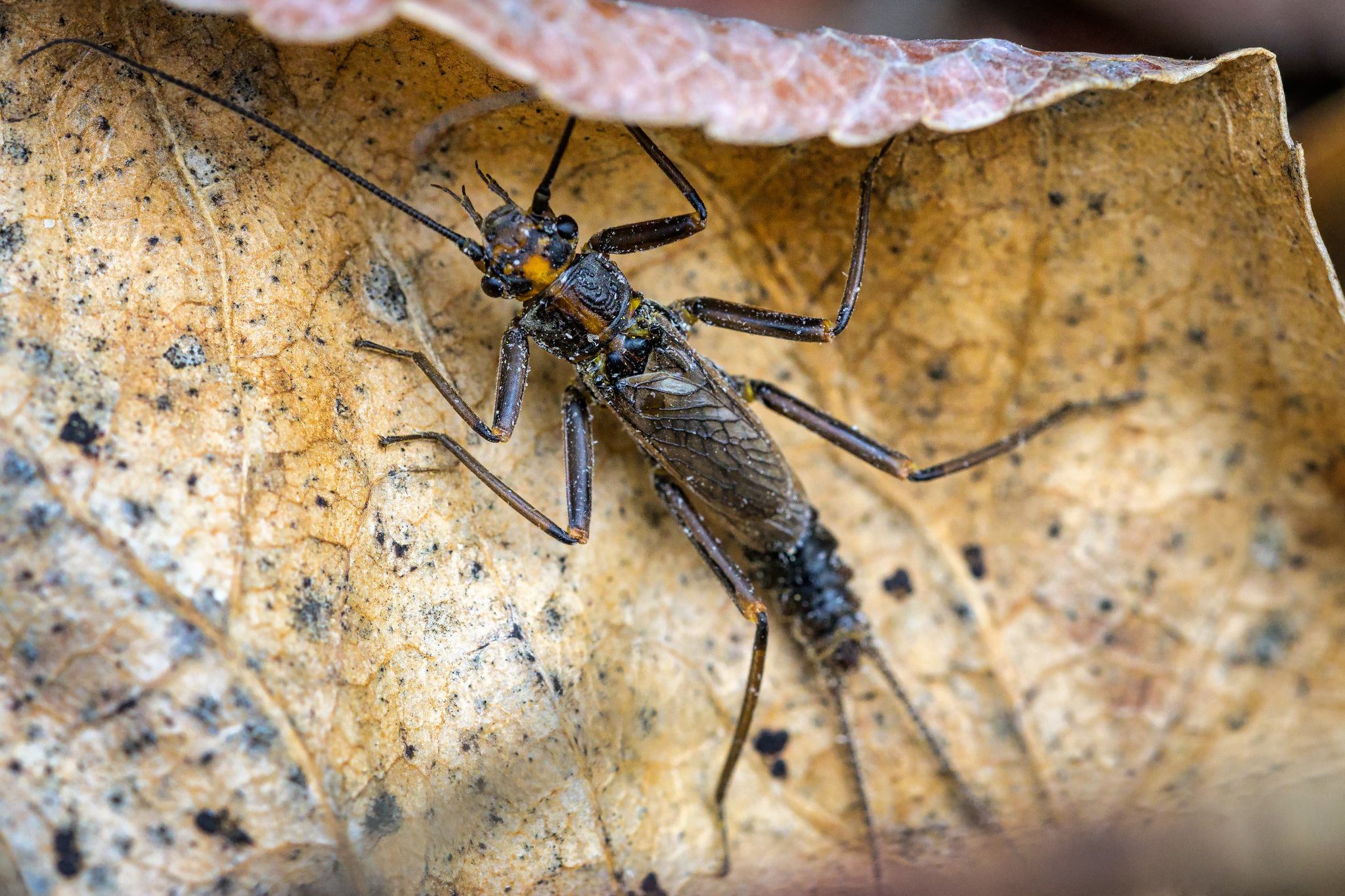

Scientific classification
- Kingdom: Animalia
- Phylum: Arthropoda
- Class: Insecta
- Order: Plecoptera
- Family: Perlodidae
- Genus: Skwala
- Species: S. americana

Binomial name
- Skwala americana (Klapálek, 1912)

Synonyms
- Arcynopteryx parallela (Frison, 1936); Skwala parallela (Frison, 1936)

= Skwala americana =

Species of insect

Skwala americana, commonly known as the American springfly, is a species of springfly in the family Perlodidae. It is found in North America.
