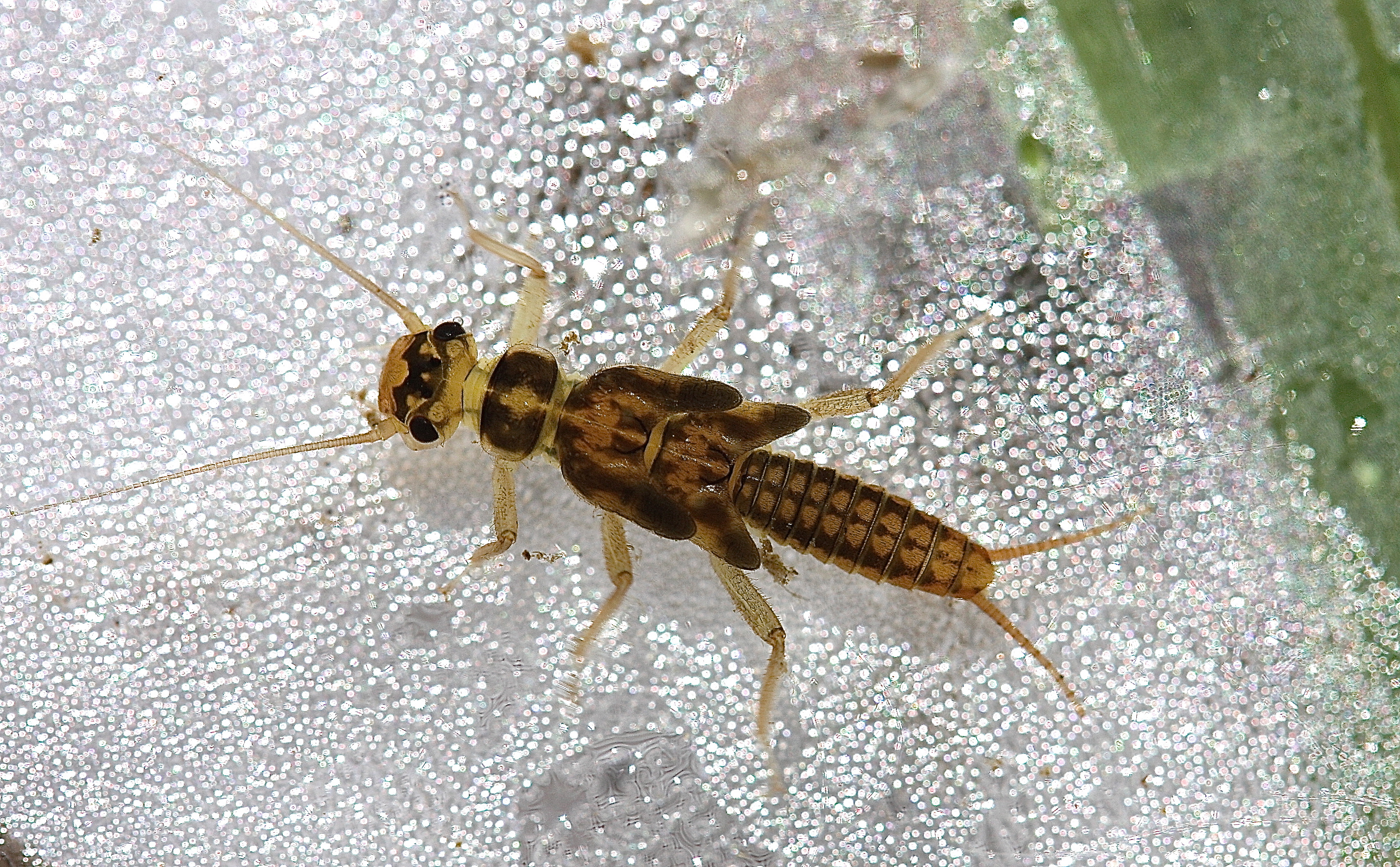

Scientific classification
- Domain: Eukaryota
- Kingdom: Animalia
- Phylum: Arthropoda
- Class: Insecta
- Order: Plecoptera
- Family: Perlodidae
- Genus: Isoperla
- Species: I. orata

Binomial name
- Isoperla orata Frison, 1942

= Isoperla orata =

Species of stonefly

Isoperla orata, the colorless stripetail, is a species of green-winged stonefly in the family Perlodidae. It is found in North America.
