= Hedinia =

Hedinia may refer to:

- Hedinia (stonefly), an insect genus in the family Perlodidae
- Hedinia (plant), a plant genus in the family Brassicaceae
