= Arcynopterygini =

Scientific classification
- Domain: Eukaryota
- Kingdom: Animalia
- Phylum: Arthropoda
- Class: Insecta
- Order: Plecoptera
- Family: Perlodidae
- Subfamily: Perlodinae
- Tribe: Arcynopterygini

Tribe of stoneflies

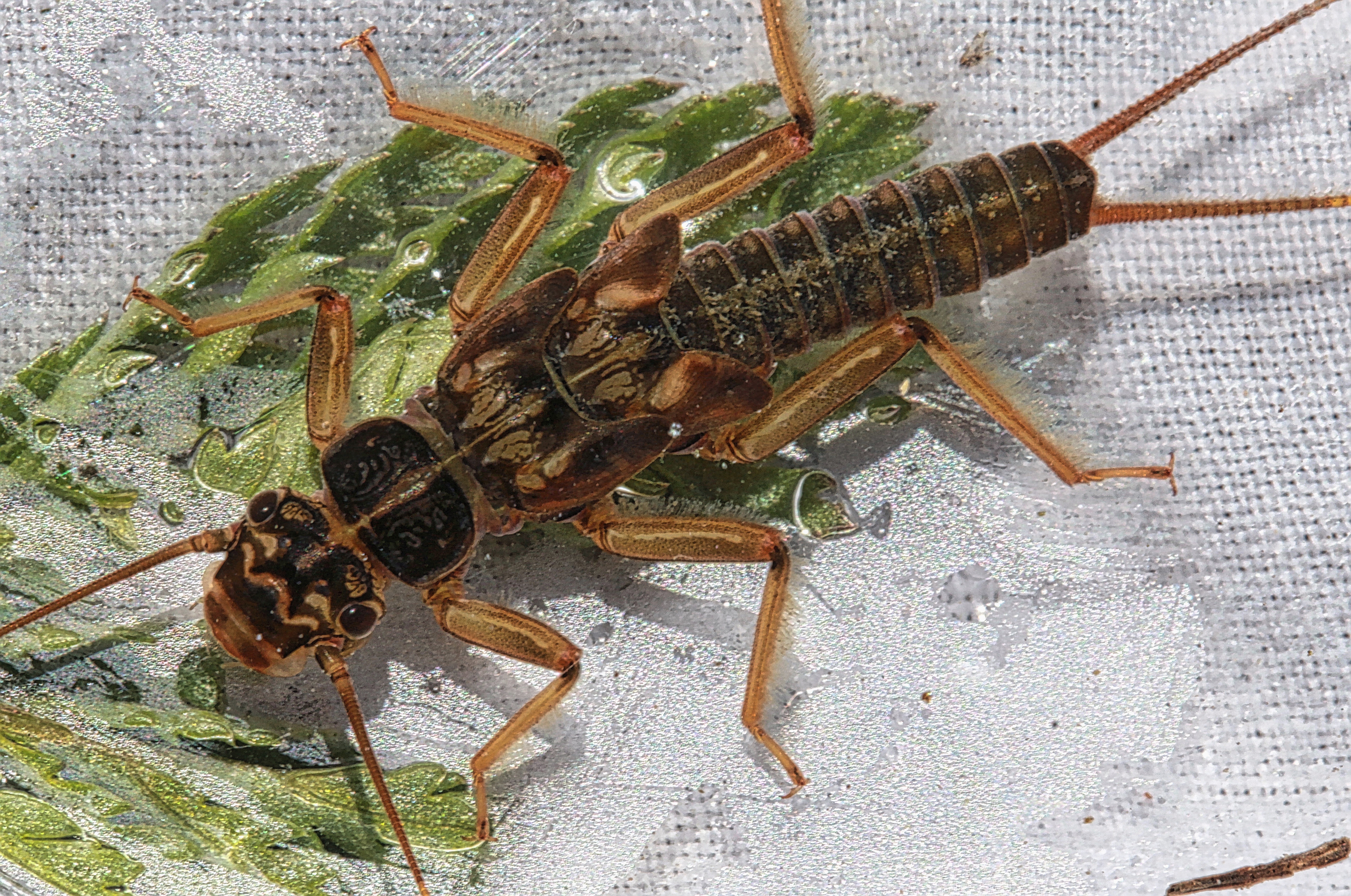
stonefly

Arcynopterygini is a tribe of springflies in the family Perlodidae. There are about 11 genera and more than 30 described species in Arcynopterygini.

== Genera ==
These 11 genera belong to the tribe Arcynopterygini:

- Arcynopteryx Klapálek, 1904
- Frisonia Ricker, 1943
- Megarcys Klapálek, 1912
- Neofilchneria Zwick, 1973
- Oroperla Needham, 1933
- Perlinodes Needham & Claassen, 1925
- Pseudomegarcys Kohno, 1946
- Salmoperla Baumann & Lauck, 1987
- Setvena Ricker, 1952
- Skwala Ricker, 1943
- Sopkalia Ricker, 1952
