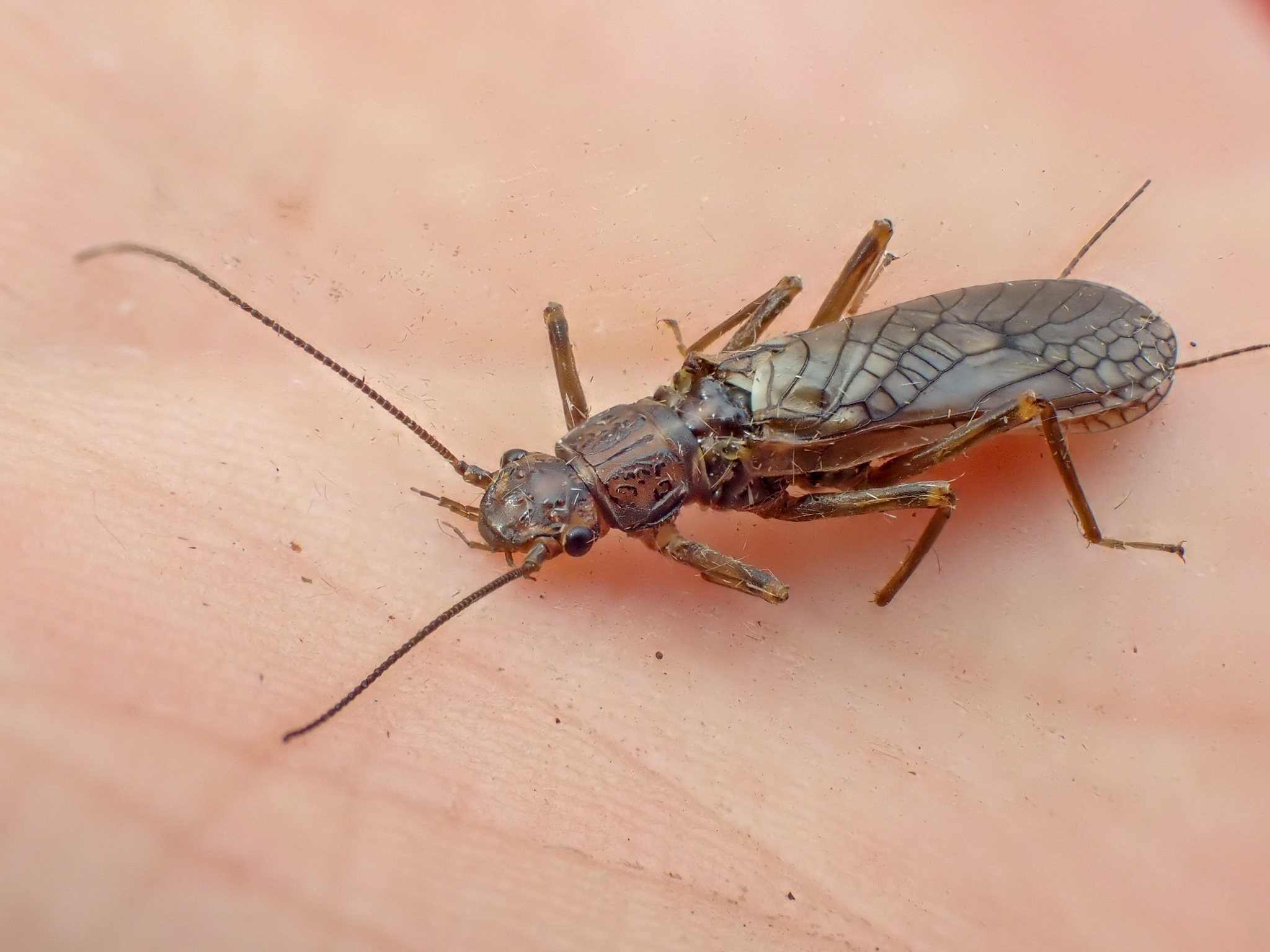

Scientific classification
- Domain: Eukaryota
- Kingdom: Animalia
- Phylum: Arthropoda
- Class: Insecta
- Order: Plecoptera
- Family: Perlodidae
- Genus: Megarcys
- Species: M. subtruncata

Binomial name
- Megarcys subtruncata Hanson, 1942

= Megarcys subtruncata =

Species of stonefly

Megarcys subtruncata, the truncate springfly, is a species of springfly in the family Perlodidae. It is found in North America.
