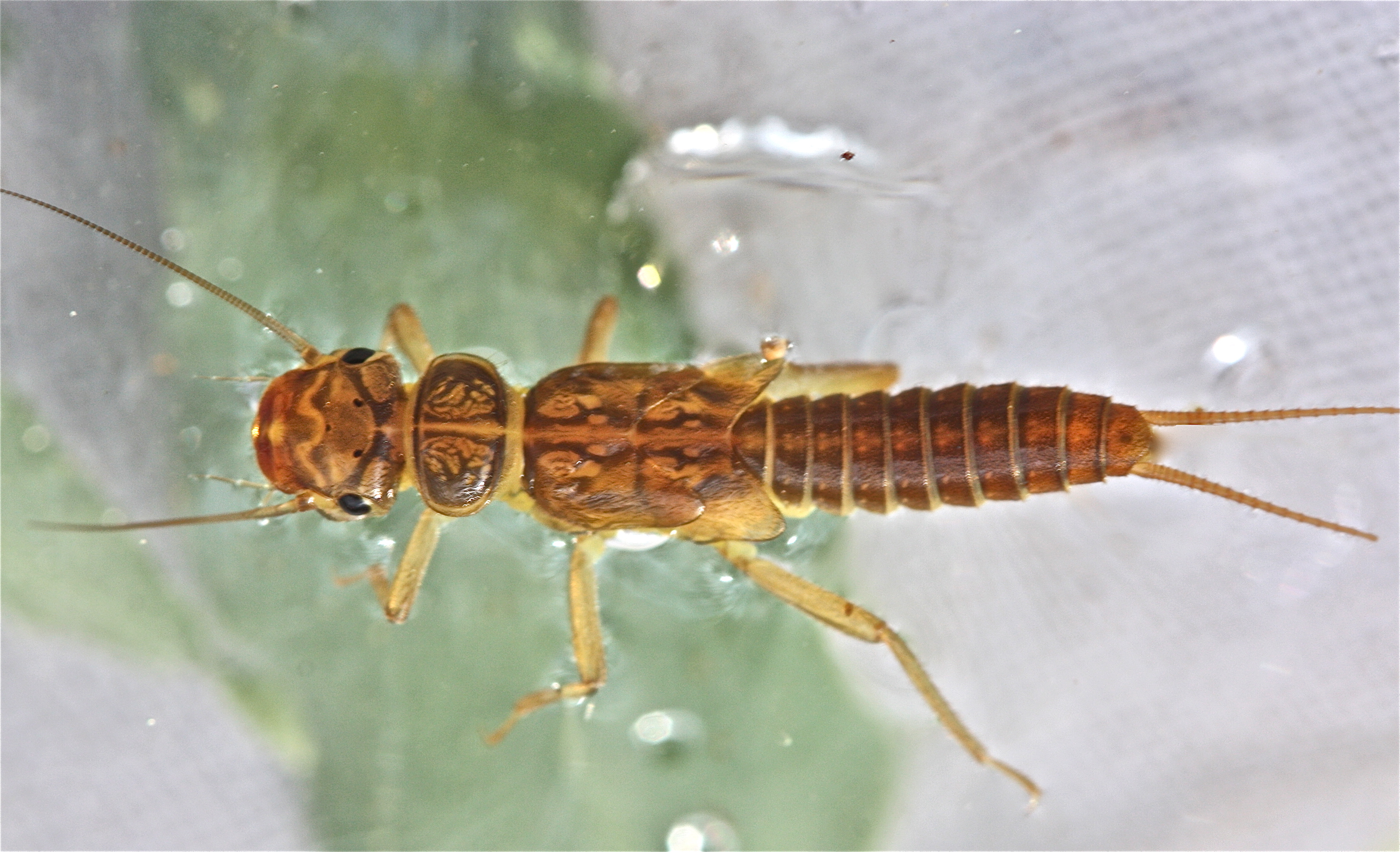

Scientific classification
- Domain: Eukaryota
- Kingdom: Animalia
- Phylum: Arthropoda
- Class: Insecta
- Order: Plecoptera
- Family: Perlodidae
- Genus: Isoperla
- Species: I. similis

Binomial name
- Isoperla similis (Hagen, 1861)

= Isoperla similis =

Species of stonefly

Isoperla similis, the black stripetail, is a species of green-winged stonefly in the family Perlodidae. It is found in North America.
