= Frison =

Frison may refer to:

- Alberto Frison (born 1988), Italian goalkeeper
- Emile Frison, Belgian plant pathologist, director general of Bioversity International (2003–2013)
- George Carr Frison (1924–2020), American archaeologist
- Herman Frison (born 1961), Belgian professional road bicycle racer
- Theodore Henry Frison (1895–1945), American entomologist

== See also ==
- Frisson
