= Isoperla lata =

Scientific classification
- Domain: Eukaryota
- Kingdom: Animalia
- Phylum: Arthropoda
- Class: Insecta
- Order: Plecoptera
- Family: Perlodidae
- Genus: Isoperla
- Species: I. lata

Binomial name
- Isoperla lata Frison, 1942

Species of stonefly

Isoperla lata, the dark stripetail, is a species of green-winged stonefly in the family Perlodidae. It is found in North America.
