= Isoperla marmorata =

Scientific classification
- Domain: Eukaryota
- Kingdom: Animalia
- Phylum: Arthropoda
- Class: Insecta
- Order: Plecoptera
- Family: Perlodidae
- Genus: Isoperla
- Species: I. marmorata

Binomial name
- Isoperla marmorata Needham & Claassen, 1925

Species of stonefly

Isoperla marmorata, the red stripetail, is a species of green-winged stonefly in the family Perlodidae. It is found in North America.
