= Isoperla marlynia =

Scientific classification
- Domain: Eukaryota
- Kingdom: Animalia
- Phylum: Arthropoda
- Class: Insecta
- Order: Plecoptera
- Family: Perlodidae
- Genus: Isoperla
- Species: I. marlynia

Binomial name
- Isoperla marlynia Needham & Claassen, 1925

Species of stonefly

Isoperla marlynia, the midwestern stripetail, is a species of green-winged stoneflies in the family Perlodidae. It is found in North America, native to the United States and Canada.
