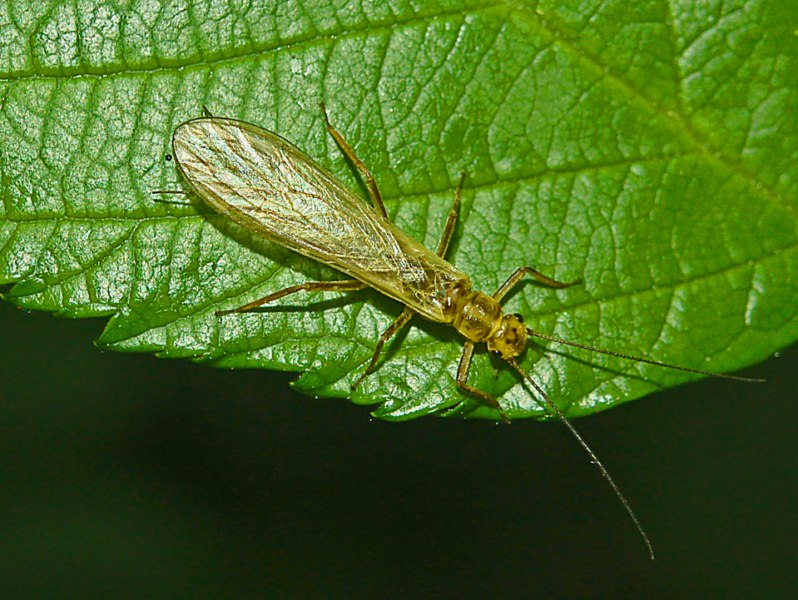

Scientific classification
- Kingdom: Animalia
- Phylum: Arthropoda
- Class: Insecta
- Order: Plecoptera
- Family: Perlodidae
- Genus: Isoperla
- Species: I. carbonaria

Binomial name
- Isoperla carbonaria Aubert, 1953

= Isoperla carbonaria =

Species of stonefly

Isoperla carbonaria is a species of stonefly in the family Perlodidae.

== Description ==
Isoperla carbonaria is a rheophilous species characterised by relatively small size, reaching a length of about 10–13 mm. The basis colour is yellowish. The larvae of this predaceous stonefly mainly feed on Chironomidae, actively hunted across the surface of the substratum.

== Distribution ==
This species is present in France, Italy and Switzerland.

== Habitat ==
In the immature stage Isoperla carbonaria is aquatic and lives in freshwater, while as an adult is terrestrial and flying. It inhabits mountainous streams at an elevation of 0–350 metres (0–1,148 ft) above sea level.
