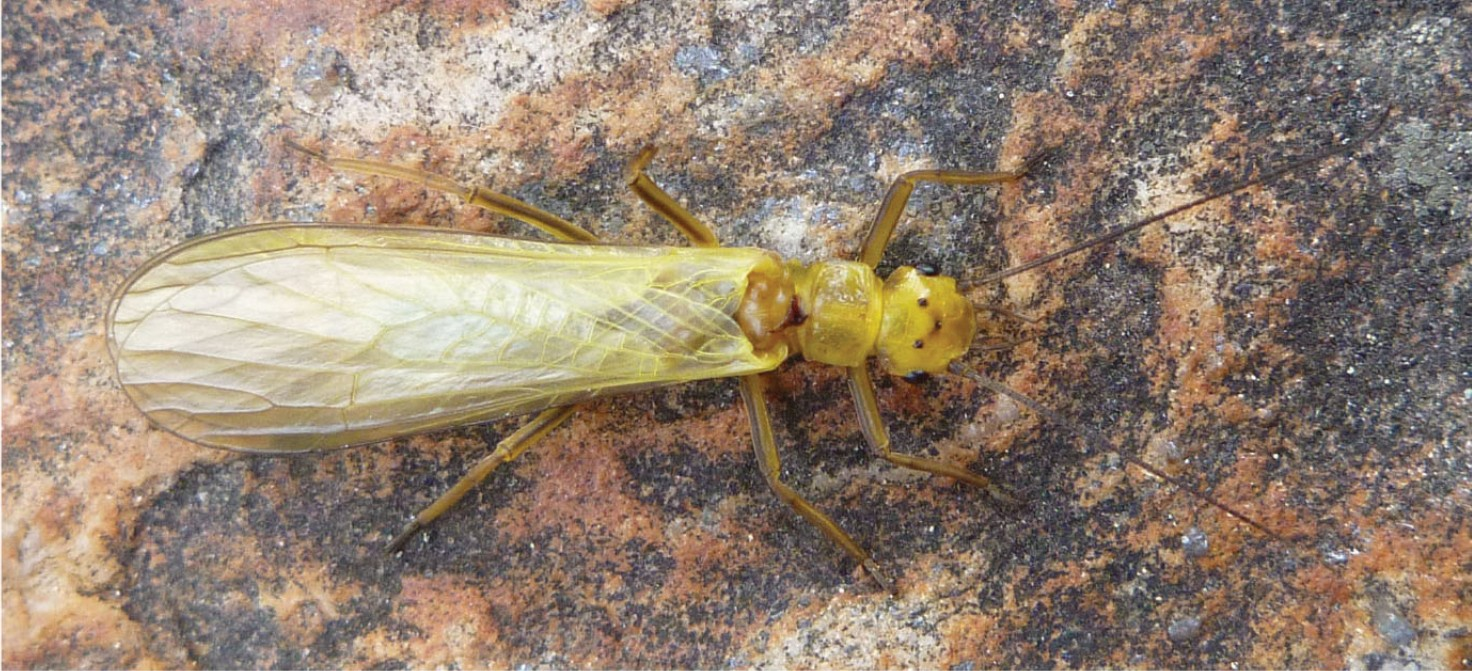

Scientific classification
- Domain: Eukaryota
- Kingdom: Animalia
- Phylum: Arthropoda
- Class: Insecta
- Order: Plecoptera
- Family: Perlodidae
- Genus: Isoperla
- Species: I. claudiae

Binomial name
- Isoperla claudiae Graf & Konar, 2014

= Isoperla claudiae =

Species of stonefly

Isoperla claudiae is an aquatic species of perlodid stonefly endemic to the Southern Limestone Alps.

== Etymology ==
The species was named after co-author Martin Konar's wife Claudia.

== Description ==
Adults measure 10.5–11 millimeters long, with 12–14 mm long forewings. General body coloration is yellow, with a horseshoe-shaped mark on the head connecting the three ocelli. Legs are brown.

Mature larvae are 13 mm long with a rectangular pronotum. Coloration is brown with two yellow spots on the head.

== Range and habitat ==
Isoperla claudiae is aquatic and is usually found in mountain brooks.

The species is found in the Karawanks and the Kamnik–Savinja Alps in Austria and Slovenia.
