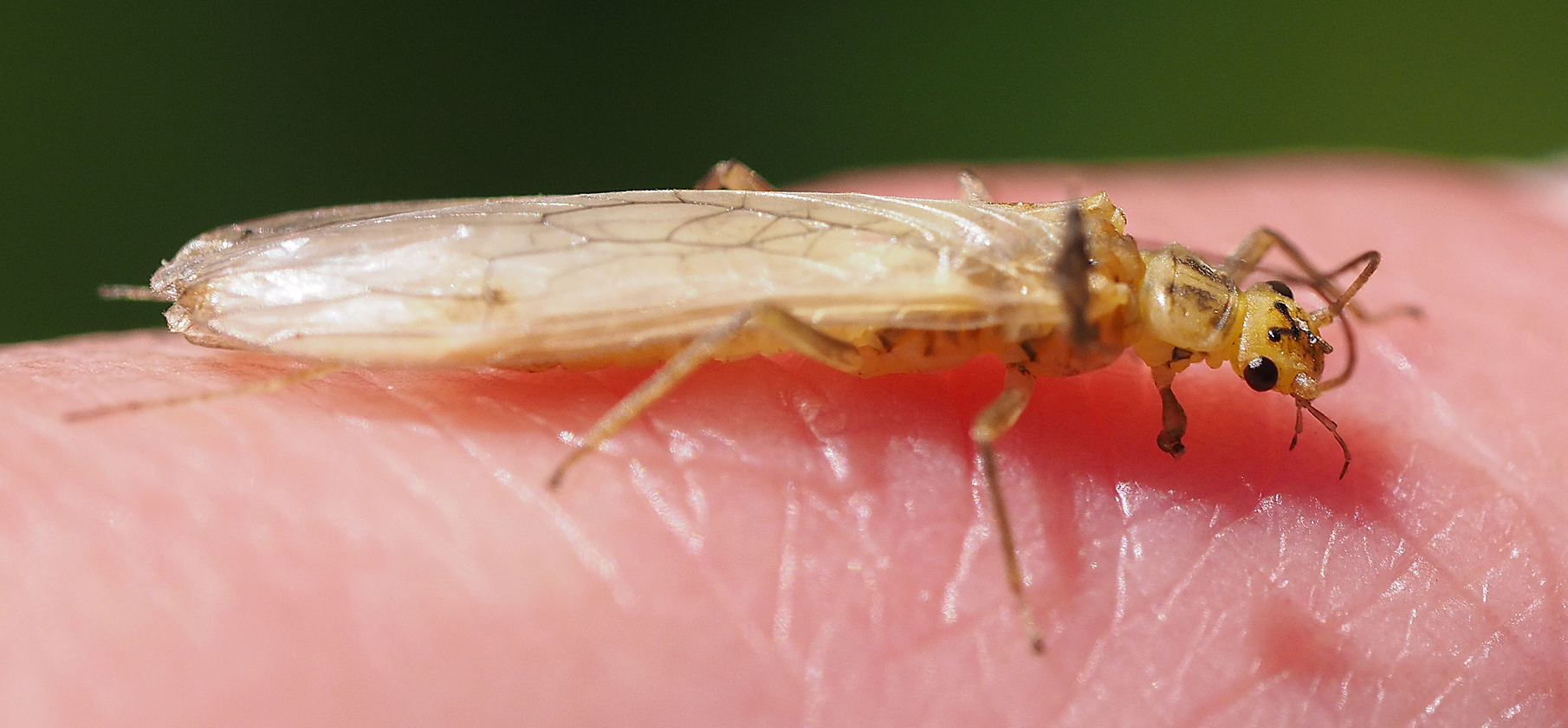

Scientific classification
- Kingdom: Animalia
- Phylum: Arthropoda
- Clade: Pancrustacea
- Class: Insecta
- Order: Plecoptera
- Family: Perlodidae
- Genus: Isoperla
- Species: I. bilineata

Binomial name
- Isoperla bilineata (Say, 1823)

= Isoperla bilineata =

Species of stonefly

Isoperla bilineata, the two-lined stripetail, is a species of green-winged stonefly in the family Perlodidae. It is found in North America. Adults feed on pollen but the larvae are predatory and come out of the water in spring.
