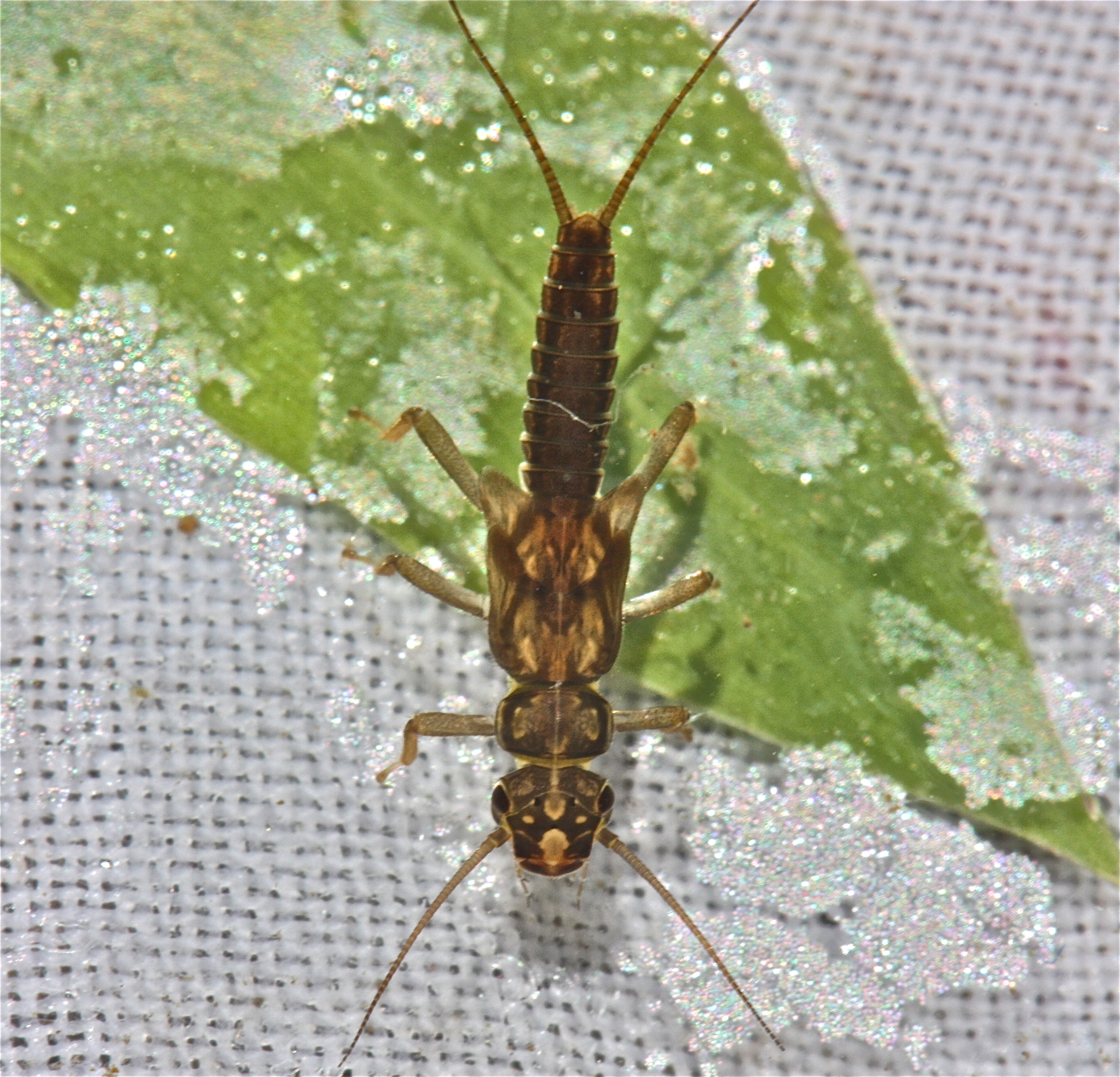

Scientific classification
- Domain: Eukaryota
- Kingdom: Animalia
- Phylum: Arthropoda
- Class: Insecta
- Order: Plecoptera
- Family: Perlodidae
- Genus: Isoperla
- Species: I. holochlora

Binomial name
- Isoperla holochlora (Klapálek, 1923)

= Isoperla holochlora =

Species of stonefly

Isoperla holochlora, the pale stripetail, is a species of green-winged stonefly in the family Perlodidae. It is found in North America.
