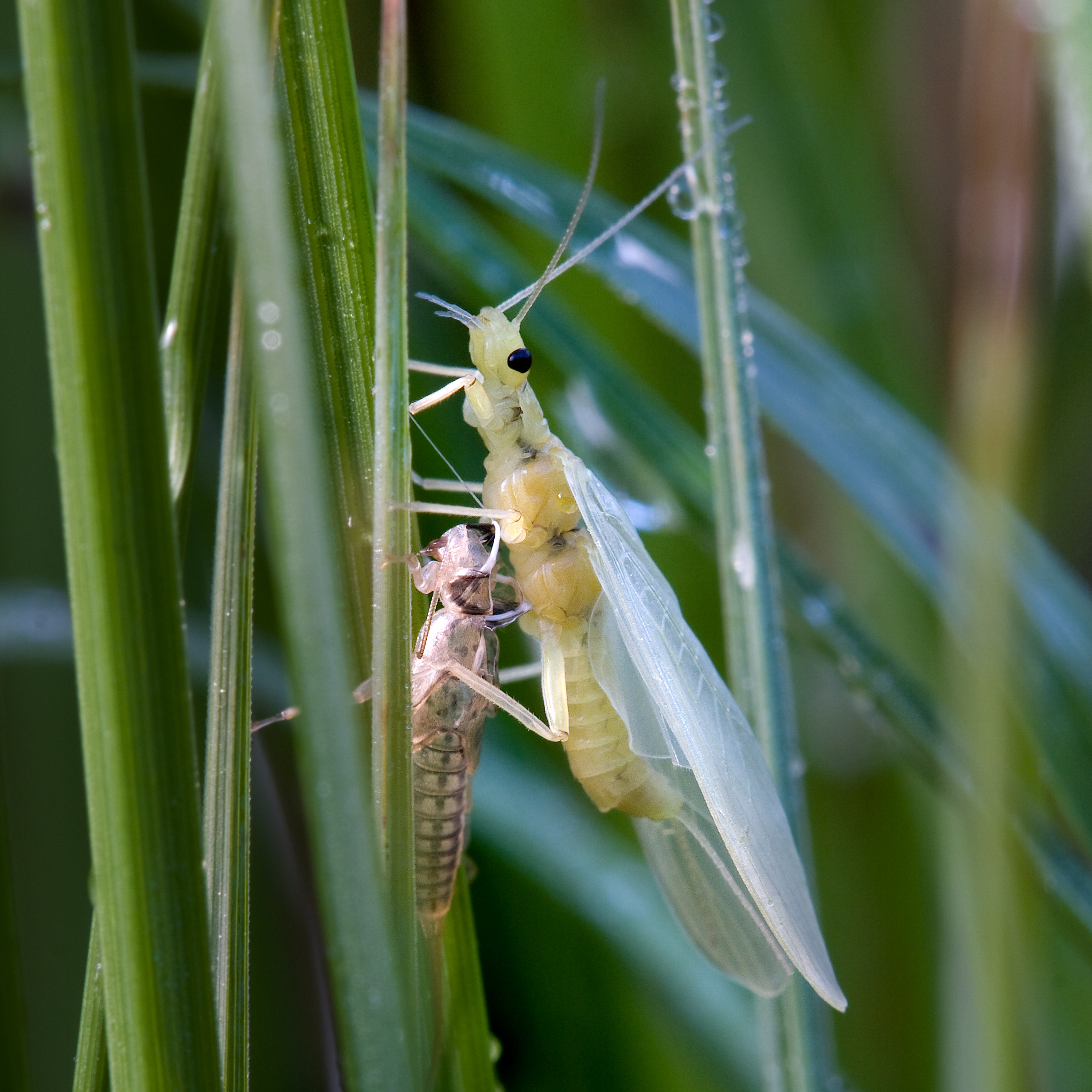
- Isoperla sp.

Scientific classification
- Kingdom: Animalia
- Phylum: Arthropoda
- Clade: Pancrustacea
- Class: Insecta
- Order: Plecoptera
- Family: Perlodidae
- Subfamily: Isoperlinae
- Genus: Isoperla; Banks, 1906

Synonyms
- Megahelus Klapálek, 1923; Nanoperla Banks, 1947; Occiperla Banks, 1947; Perliola Banks, 1947; Perliphanes Banks, 1947; Suzukia Okamoto, 1912; Walshiola Banks, 1947

Audio
- Isoperla curtata drumming

= Isoperla =

Genus of stoneflies

Isoperla is a genus of Palaearctic and Nearctic stoneflies in the subfamily Isoperlinae and the family Perlodidae (also known as stripetails or springflies).

== Species ==
The Plecoptera Species File lists:

species group acicularis (Despax, 1936)

1. Isoperla acicularis (Despax, 1936)
2. Isoperla auberti Raušer, 1968
3. Isoperla bipartita Aubert, 1963
4. Isoperla carbonaria Aubert, 1953
5. Isoperla lugens (Klapálek, 1923)
6. Isoperla pallida Aubert, 1963

species group albanica Aubert, 1964

1. Isoperla albanica Aubert, 1964
2. Isoperla belai Illies, 1963

species group bilineata (Say, 1823)

1. Isoperla bilineata (Say, 1823) - type species (as Sialis bilineata Say)
2. Isoperla dicala Frison, 1942
3. Isoperla fauschi Szczytko & Kondratieff, 2015
4. Isoperla frisoni Illies, 1966
5. Isoperla gibbsae Harper, 1971
6. Isoperla myersi Szczytko & Kondratieff, 2015
7. Isoperla powhatan Szczytko & Kondratieff, 2015
8. Isoperla richardsoni Frison, 1935
9. Isoperla riverae Verdone, Beaty, Holland & Williams, 2023
10. Isoperla sagittata Szczytko & Stewart, 1976
11. Isoperla tutelo Szczytko & Kondratieff, 2015
12. Isoperla zuelligi Szczytko & Kondratieff, 2015

species group burksi Frison, 1942

1. Isoperla burksi Frison, 1942
2. Isoperla cotta Ricker, 1952
3. Isoperla orata Frison, 1942

species group decolorata (Walker, 1852)

1. Isoperla davisi James, 1974
2. Isoperla decolorata (Walker, 1852)
3. Isoperla transmarina (Newman, 1838)

species group difformis (Klapálek, 1909)

1. Isoperla difformis (Klapálek, 1909)
2. Isoperla inermis Kacanski & Zwick, 1970

species group grammatica (Poda, 1761)

1. Isoperla buresi Raušer, 1962
2. Isoperla felderorum Roesti, 2021
3. Isoperla grammatica (Poda, 1761)
4. Isoperla nevada Aubert, 1952

species group irregularis (Klapálek, 1923)

1. Isoperla decepta Frison, 1935
2. Isoperla evanescens Verdone & Kondratieff, 2016
3. Isoperla irregularis (Klapálek, 1923)
4. Isoperla ouachita Stark & Stewart, 1973
5. Isoperla szczytkoi Poulton & Stewart, 1987

species group lata Frison, 1942

1. Isoperla lata Frison, 1942
2. Isoperla marlynia Needham & Claassen, 1925
3. Isoperla pseudolata Szczytko & Kondratieff, 2015

species group longiseta Banks, 1906

1. Isoperla jewetti Szczytko & Stewart, 1976
2. Isoperla longiseta Banks, 1906

species group marmorata (Needham & Claassen, 1925)

1. Isoperla fulva Claassen, 1937
2. Isoperla marmorata (Needham & Claassen, 1925)
3. Isoperla roguensis Szczytko & Stewart, 1984

species group montana (Banks, 1898)

1. Isoperla sp. A [temporary name]
2. Isoperla dewalti Verdone & Kondratieff, 2017
3. Isoperla montana (Banks, 1898)
4. Isoperla nelsoni Szczytko & Kondratieff, 2015

species group nana (Walsh, 1862)

1. Isoperla catawba Szczytko & Kondratieff, 2015
2. Isoperla lenati Szczytko & Kondratieff, 2015
3. Isoperla nana (Walsh, 1862)

species group obscura (Zetterstedt, 1840)

1. Isoperla minima Illies, 1963
2. Isoperla obscura (Zetterstedt, 1840)

species group oxylepis (Despax, 1936)

1. Isoperla bosnica Aubert, 1964
2. Isoperla orobica Ravizza, 1975
3. Isoperla oxylepis (Despax, 1936)
4. Isoperla submontana Raušer, 1965

species group pawlowskii Wojtas, 1961

1. Isoperla pawlowskii Wojtas, 1961

species group phalerata (Needham, 1917)

1. Isoperla phalerata (Needham, 1917)
2. Isoperla pinta Frison, 1937
3. Isoperla slossonae (Banks, 1911)

species group pseudosimilis Szczytko & Kondratieff, 2015

1. Isoperla pauli Szczytko & Kondratieff, 2015
2. Isoperla pseudosimilis Szczytko & Kondratieff, 2015
3. Isoperla reesi Szczytko & Kondratieff, 2015
4. Isoperla stewarti Szczytko & Kondratieff, 2015
5. Isoperla yuchi Szczytko & Kondratieff, 2015

species group quinquepunctata (Banks, 1902)

1. Isoperla acula Jewett, 1962
2. Isoperla mormona Banks, 1920
3. Isoperla quinquepunctata (Banks, 1902)

species group rivulorum (Pictet, 1841)

1. Isoperla ambigua (Despax, 1936)
2. Isoperla andreinii (Festa, 1938)
3. Isoperla carpathica Kis, 1971
4. Isoperla citrina Murányi, 2011
5. Isoperla goertzi Illies, 1952
6. Isoperla hyblaea Consiglio, 1961
7. Isoperla ilvana Consiglio, 1958
8. Isoperla insularis (Morton, 1930)
9. Isoperla kir Fochetti & Vinçon, 1993
10. Isoperla oenotriae Consiglio, 1967
11. Isoperla rivulorum (Pictet, 1841)

species group saccai (Festa, 1939)

1. Isoperla russevi Sowa, 1970
2. Isoperla saccai (Festa, 1939)

species group signata (Banks, 1902)

1. Isoperla francesca Harper, 1971
2. Isoperla holochlora Klapálek, 1923
3. Isoperla kirchneri Szczytko & Kondratieff, 2015
4. Isoperla namata Frison, 1942
5. Isoperla signata (Banks, 1902)
6. Isoperla siouan Szczytko & Kondratieff, 2015

species group silesica Illies, 1952

1. Isoperla breviptera Ikonomov, 1980
2. Isoperla silesica Illies, 1952
3. Isoperla vevcianensis Ikonomov, 1980
4. Isoperla zwicki Tierno de Figueroa & Fochetti, 2001

species group similis (Hagen, 1861)

1. Isoperla bellona Banks, 1911
2. Isoperla cherokee Szczytko & Kondratieff, 2015
3. Isoperla distincta Nelson, 1976
4. Isoperla major Nelson & Kondratieff, 1983
5. Isoperla sandbergi Szczytko & Kondratieff, 2015
6. Isoperla similis (Hagen, 1861)
7. Isoperla starki Szczytko & Kondratieff, 2015

species group sobria (Hagen, 1874)

1. Isoperla baumanni Szczytko & Stewart, 1984
2. Isoperla gravitans (Needham & Claassen, 1925)
3. Isoperla miwok Bottorff & Szczytko, 1990
4. Isoperla sobria (Hagen, 1874)
5. Isoperla tilasqua Szczytko & Stewart, 1979

species group sordida Banks, 1906

1. Isoperla adunca Jewett, 1962
2. Isoperla bifurcata Szczytko & Stewart, 1979
3. Isoperla denningi Jewett, 1955
4. Isoperla fusca Needham & Claassen, 1925
5. Isoperla petersoni Needham & Christenson, 1927
6. Isoperla rainiera Jewett, 1954
7. Isoperla sordida Banks, 1906
8. Isoperla umpqua Szczytko & Stewart, 2013

species group sudetica (Kolenati, 1859)

1. Isoperla sudetica (Kolenati, 1859)

species group tripartita Illies, 1954

1. Isoperla autumnalis Murányi, 2011
2. Isoperla illyrica Tabacaru, 1971
3. Isoperla obliqua Zwick, 1978
4. Isoperla pesici Murányi, 2011
5. Isoperla popijaci Hlebec & Sivec, 2021
6. Isoperla tripartita Illies, 1954
7. Isoperla vjosae Graf & Vitecek, 2018

species group viridinervis (Pictet, 1865)

1. Isoperla viridinervis (Pictet, 1865)

species group not determined

1. Isoperla aizuana Kohno, 1953
2. Isoperla altaica Šámal, 1939
3. Isoperla arcana Beaty, Holland & Lenat, 2017
4. Isoperla armeniaca Zhiltzova, 1961
5. Isoperla asiatica Raušer, 1968
6. Isoperla azusana Kohno, 1953
7. †Isoperla baltica Jouault, Legendre, Condamine & Nel, 2021
8. Isoperla berthelemyi Sivec & Dia, 2002
9. Isoperla bimaculata Yang & Yang, 1996
10. Isoperla bithynica (Kempny, 1908)
11. Isoperla borisi Beaty, Holland & Lenat, 2017
12. Isoperla chazaudina Navás, 1923
13. Isoperla chereshnevi Teslenko, 2017
14. Isoperla chickamauga Szczytko & Kondratieff, 2015
15. Isoperla chius Zwick, 1978
16. Isoperla chongxui Chen, Du & Li, 2021
17. Isoperla citronella (Newport, 1851)
18. Isoperla claudiae Graf & Konar, 2014
19. Isoperla †conspicua Frison, 1935
20. Isoperla curtata Navás, 1924
21. Isoperla debilis Kohno, 1953
22. Isoperla emarginata Harden & Mickel, 1952
23. Isoperla eximia Zapekina-Dulkeit, 1975
24. Isoperla flava Kis, 1963
25. Isoperla flavescens Zhiltzova & Potikha, 1986
26. Isoperla fukushimensis Kohno, 1953
27. Isoperla hemithales Navás, 1923
28. Isoperla ikariae Zwick, 1978
29. Isoperla jamesae Grubbs & Szczytko, 2010
30. Isoperla kappa Ishizuka, 2002
31. Isoperla katmaiensis Szczytko & Stewart, 1979
32. Isoperla kozlovi Zhiltzova, 1972
33. Isoperla laucki Baumann & Lee, 2009
34. Isoperla lesbica Zwick, 1978
35. Isoperla libanica Aubert, 1964
36. Isoperla lunigera (Klapálek, 1923)
37. Isoperla luzoni Tierno de Figueroa & Vinçon, 2005
38. Isoperla maculata Zhiltzova, 1977
39. Isoperla maxana Harden & Mickel, 1952
40. Isoperla mongolica Zhiltzova, 1972
41. Isoperla morenica Tierno de Figueroa & Luzón-Ortega, 2011
42. Isoperla moselyi (Despax, 1936)
43. Isoperla motonis (Okamoto, 1912)
44. Isoperla nagyi Murányi, Kovács & Graf, 2020
45. Isoperla nanchana Navás, 1922
46. Isoperla neimongolica Yang & Yang, 1996
47. Isoperla nilovana Navás, 1923
48. Isoperla nipponica Okamoto, 1912
49. Isoperla okamotonis Kohno, 1941
50. Isoperla ordosi Wu, 1938
51. Isoperla ornata Zhiltzova, 1988
52. Isoperla peterzwicki Stark & Sivec, 2008
53. Isoperla poffi Szczytko & Kondratieff, 2015
54. Isoperla potanini (Klapálek, 1921)
55. Isoperla praetexta (Klapálek, 1923)
56. Isoperla prokopovi Zhiltzova & Zwick, 2012
57. Isoperla pseudornata Zhiltzova, 1988
58. Isoperla pusilla (Klapálek, 1923)
59. Isoperla qinlinga Chen, 2019
60. Isoperla retroloba Wu, 1938
61. Isoperla rhododendri Zhiltzova, 1956
62. Isoperla sejila Cao, Wang & Li, 2020
63. Isoperla sextuberculata Huo & Du, 2020
64. Isoperla shibakawae Okamoto, 1912
65. Isoperla sowerbyi Wu & Claassen, 1934
66. Isoperla suzukii Okamoto, 1912
67. Isoperla towadensis Okamoto, 1912
68. Isoperla uenoi Kawai, 1967
69. Isoperla yangi Wu, 1935
