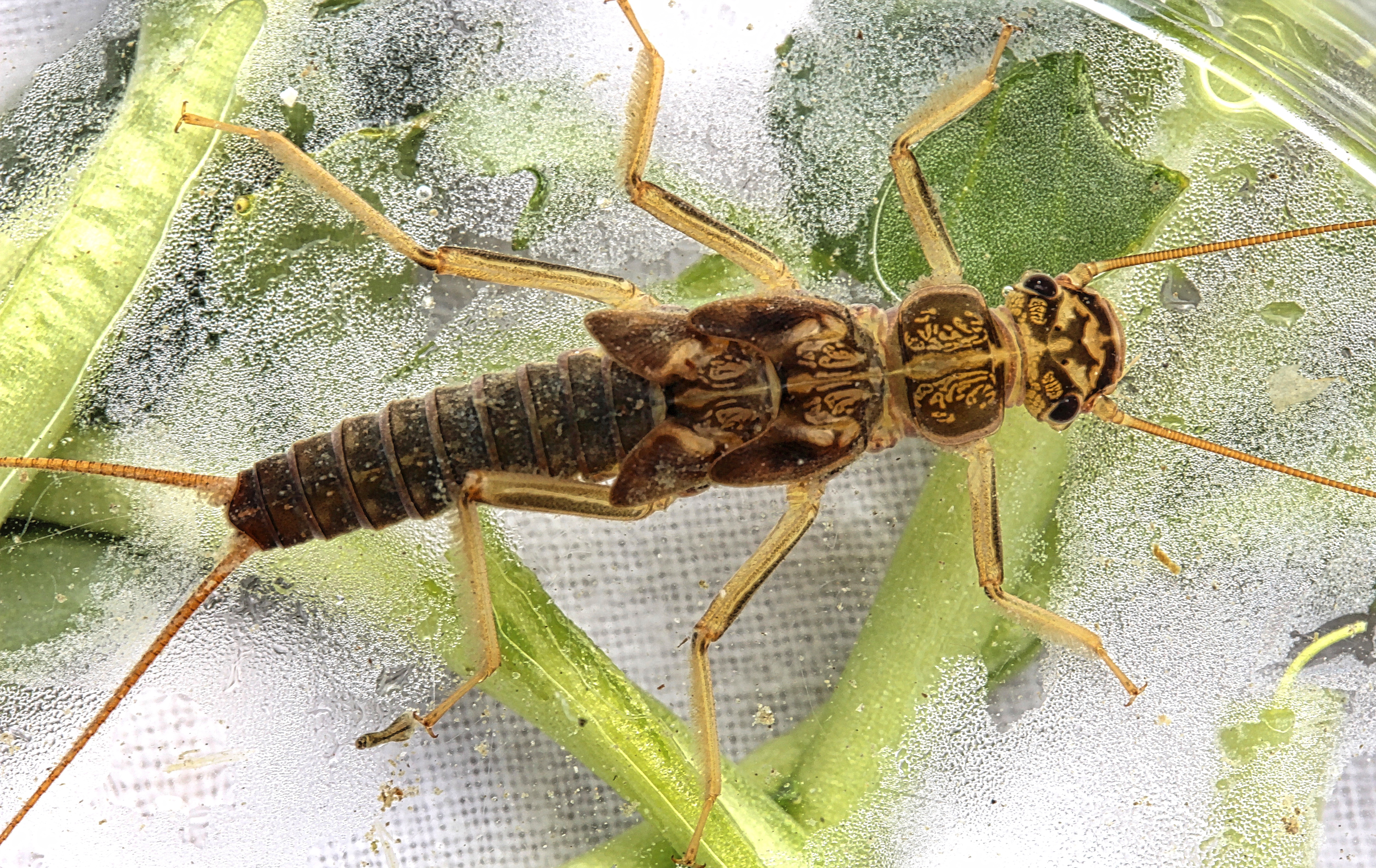
- Skwala sp.

Scientific classification
- Domain: Eukaryota
- Kingdom: Animalia
- Phylum: Arthropoda
- Class: Insecta
- Order: Plecoptera
- Family: Perlodidae
- Tribe: Arcynopterygini
- Genus: Skwala; Ricker, 1943

= Skwala =

Genus of stoneflies

Skwala is a genus of springflies in the family Perlodidae. There are about five described species in Skwala.

== Species ==
- Skwala americana (Klapálek, 1912) (American springfly)
- Skwala asiatica Zhiltzova, 1972
- Skwala compacta (McLachlan, 1872)
- Skwala curvata (Hanson, 1942) (curved springfly)
- Skwala natorii Chino, 1999
