= Megarcys =

Scientific classification
- Domain: Eukaryota
- Kingdom: Animalia
- Phylum: Arthropoda
- Class: Insecta
- Order: Plecoptera
- Family: Perlodidae
- Tribe: Arcynopterygini
- Genus: Megarcys; Klapálek, 1912

Genus of stoneflies

Megarcys is a genus of springflies in the family Perlodidae. There are about 11 described species in Megarcys.

== Species ==
These 11 species belong to the genus Megarcys:

- Megarcys bussoni (Navás, 1923)
- Megarcys irregularis (Banks, 1900)
- Megarcys magnilobus Zhiltzova, 1988
- Megarcys ochracea (Klapálek, 1912)
- Megarcys pseudochracea Zhiltzova, 1977
- Megarcys signata (Hagen, 1874)
- Megarcys sjostedti (Navás, 1930)
- Megarcys subtruncata Hanson, 1942 (truncate springfly)
- Megarcys teslenkonis Zwick & P., 2010
- Megarcys watertoni (Ricker, 1952)
- Megarcys yosemite (Needham & Claassen, 1925)
