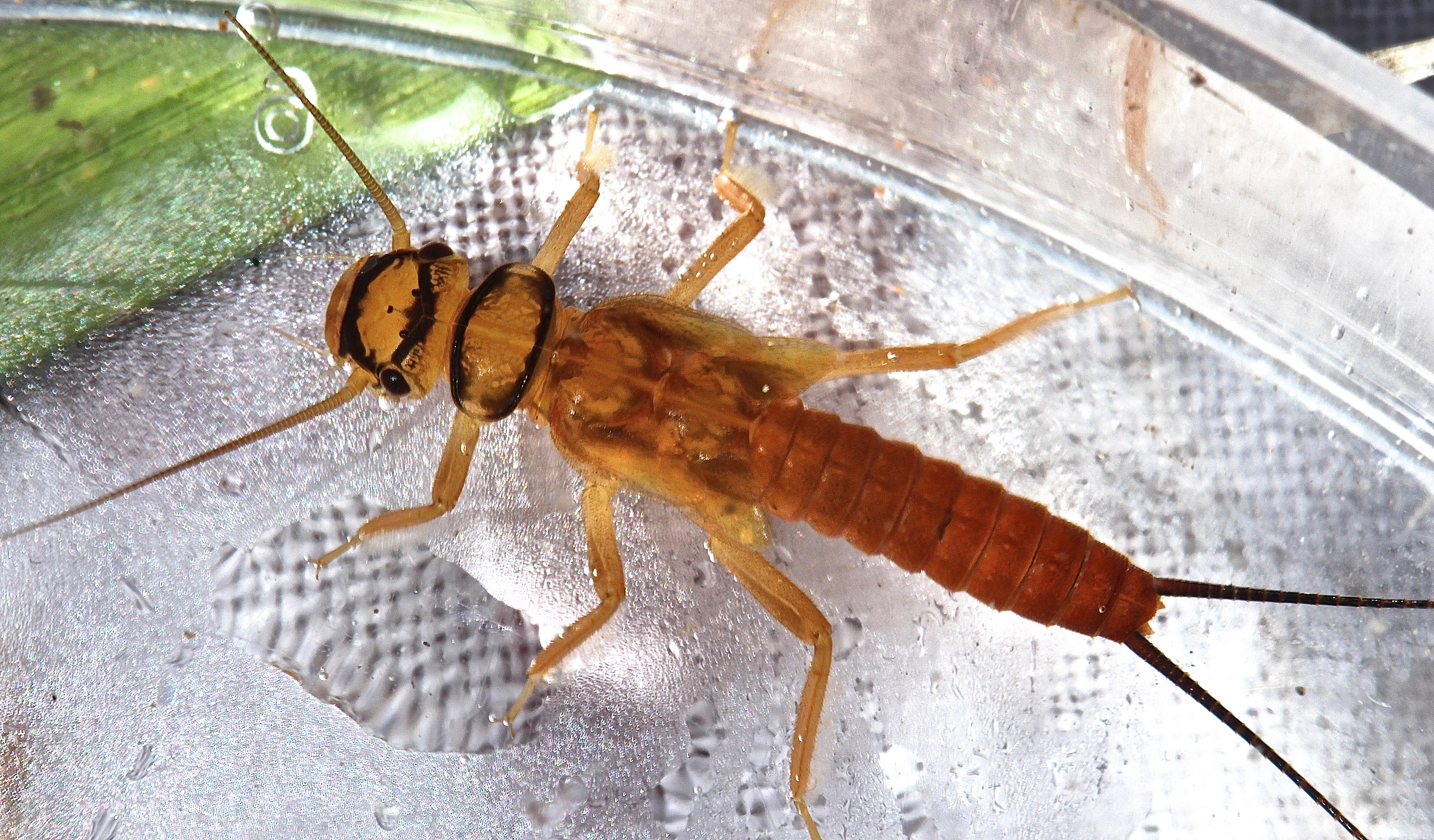

Scientific classification
- Domain: Eukaryota
- Kingdom: Animalia
- Phylum: Arthropoda
- Class: Insecta
- Order: Plecoptera
- Family: Perlodidae
- Subfamily: Isoperlinae
- Genus: Clioperla; Needham & Claassen, 1925
- Species: C. clio

Binomial name
- Clioperla clio (Newman, 1839)

= Clioperla =

Genus of stoneflies

Clioperla is a genus of green-winged Nearctic stoneflies in the family Perlodidae. It is monotypic, being represented by the single species, Clioperla clio.
