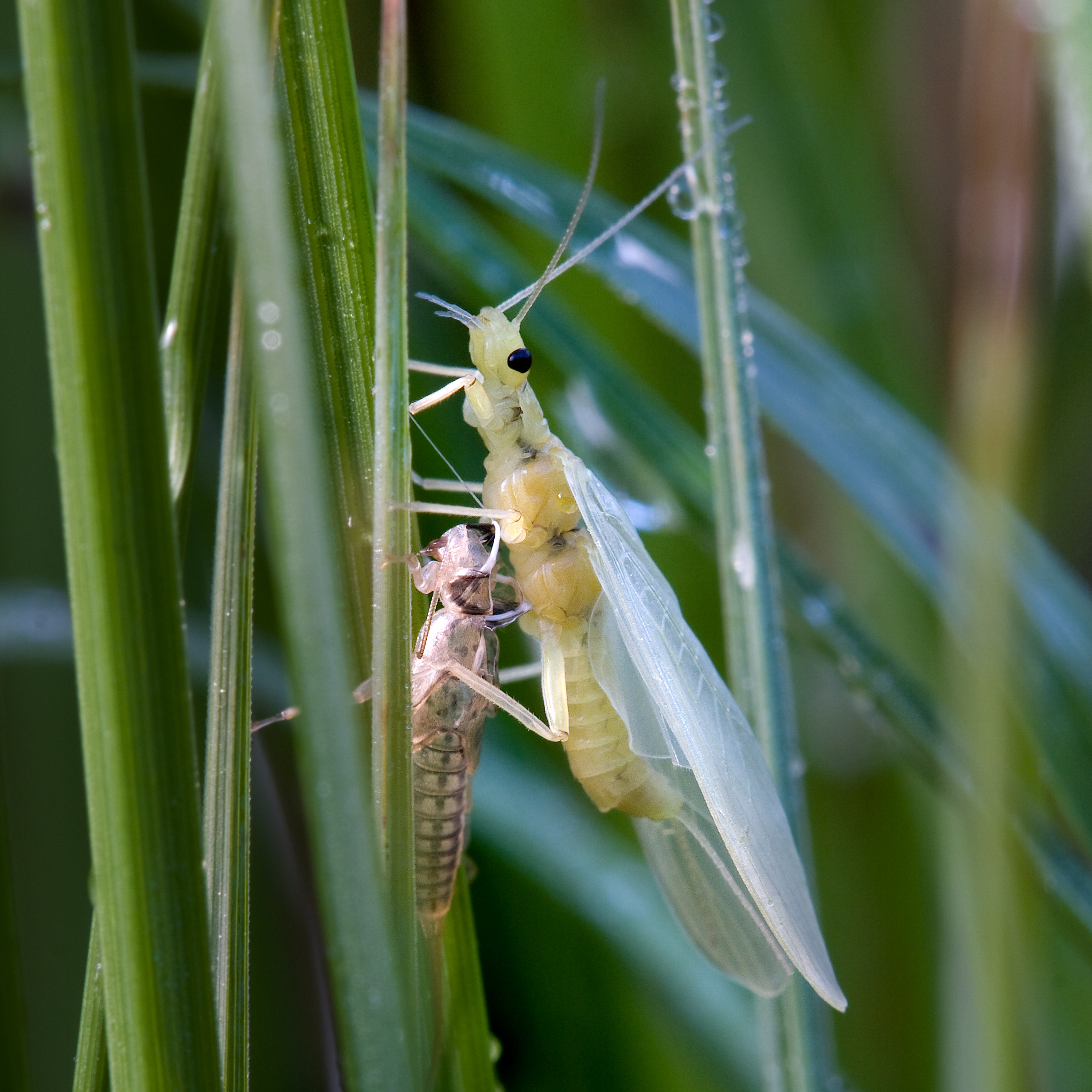
- Isoperla sp

Scientific classification
- Domain: Eukaryota
- Kingdom: Animalia
- Phylum: Arthropoda
- Class: Insecta
- Order: Plecoptera
- Family: Perlodidae
- Subfamily: Isoperlinae; Frison, 1942

Genera
- See text

Synonyms
- Calliperlinae; Isoperlini Frison, 1942

= Isoperlinae =

Subfamily of stoneflies

Isoperlinae is a subfamily of Palaearctic and Nearctic stoneflies in the family Perlodidae, also known as stripetails or springflies.

== Genera ==
The Plecoptera Species File lists:

1. Calliperla Banks, 1947
2. Cascadoperla Szczytko & Stewart, 1979
3. Clioperla Needham & Claassen, 1925
4. Cosumnoperla Szczytko & Bottorff, 1987
5. Isoperla Banks, 1906
6. Kaszabia Raušer, 1968
7. Mesoperlina Klapálek, 1921
8. Parisoperla Huo & Du, 2020
9. Tibetisoperla Huo & Du, 2021
