= Arcynopteryx =

Scientific classification
- Domain: Eukaryota
- Kingdom: Animalia
- Phylum: Arthropoda
- Class: Insecta
- Order: Plecoptera
- Family: Perlodidae
- Genus: Arcynopteryx; Klapálek, 1904

Genus of insects

Arcynopteryx is a genus of insects belonging to the family Perlodidae.

The species of this genus are found in Europe and Northern America.

Species:

- Arcynopteryx amurensis Zhiltzova & Levanidova, 1978
- Arcynopteryx angarensis Teslenko & Zhiltzova, 2012
