= Hedinia (stonefly) =

Scientific classification
- Domain: Eukaryota
- Kingdom: Animalia
- Phylum: Arthropoda
- Class: Insecta
- Order: Plecoptera
- Family: Perlodidae
- Genus: Hedinia; Navás, 1936

Genus of stoneflies

Hedinia is a genus of insects belonging to the family Perlodidae.

Species:

- Hedinia implexa Navás, 1936
