= Theodore Henry Frison =

American entomologist (1895-1945)

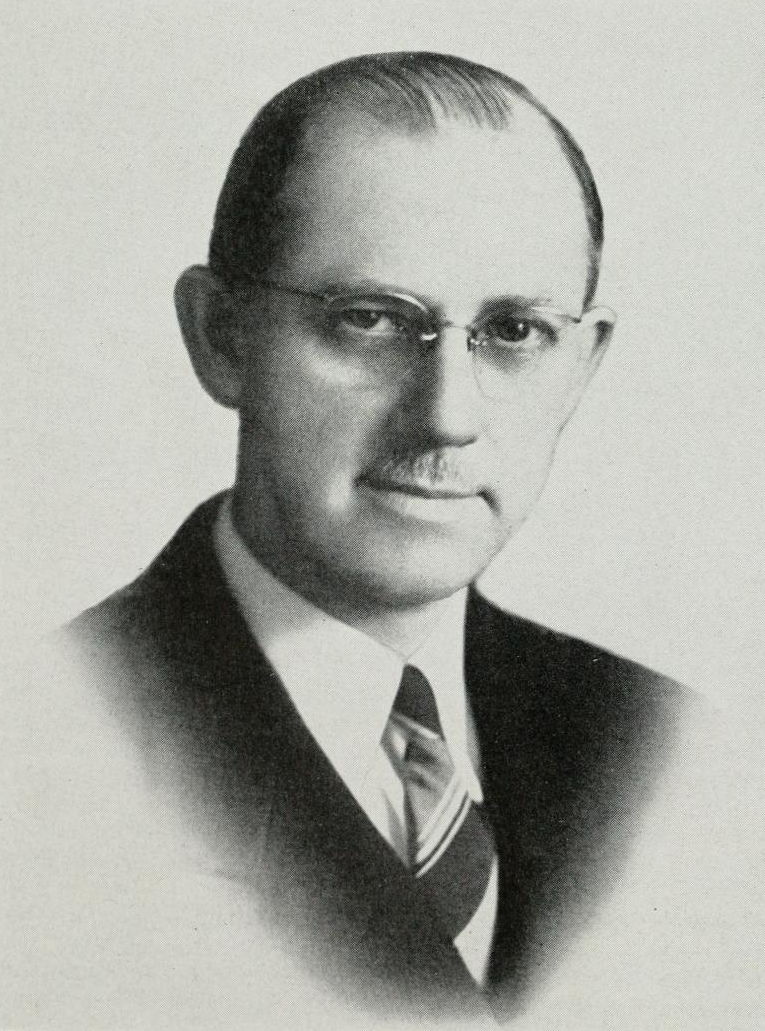

Theodore Henry Frison (17 January 1895 – 9 December 1945) was an American entomologist and wildlife conservationist. He specialized in the study of bumblebees, aphids, and stoneflies. He served as a chief of the Illinois Natural History Survey for fifteen years from 1931.

Frison was born in Champaign, Illinois, to German immigrants Joseph and Helen O'Neal. He went to Champaign High School where he became interested in entomology as his neighbor was professor J. W. Folsom. Through Folsom he came to meet Stephen Alfred Forbes and he was allowed to attend university courses in entomology when he was still in school. He graduated from school in 1918 and enlisted in the army during World War I. After a year of service as a second lieutenant of infantry he resigned to study at the University of Illinois. He received a master's degree in 1920 and a doctorate in 1923. He worked an assistant in the entomology department and in 1920 he was made Assistant State Entomologist of Wisconsin. He moved to the US Bureau of Entomology and Plant Quarantine in 1921 and worked in Moorestown, NJ. In 1923, he joined the Illinois Natural History Survey. In 1930, following the death of Forbes, he was acting chief and from 1931 he was Chief of the Survey. He expanded the survey to deal with several aspects of wildlife biology. He served as director of the Central States Forestry Congress from 1933 and edited the Journal of Economic Entomology from 1936 to 1939.

Frison married Ruby Gertrude Dukes in 1919 and they had a son and a daughter. Apart from science, he had an interest in music and art, playing the violin. He also played tennis and golf.
