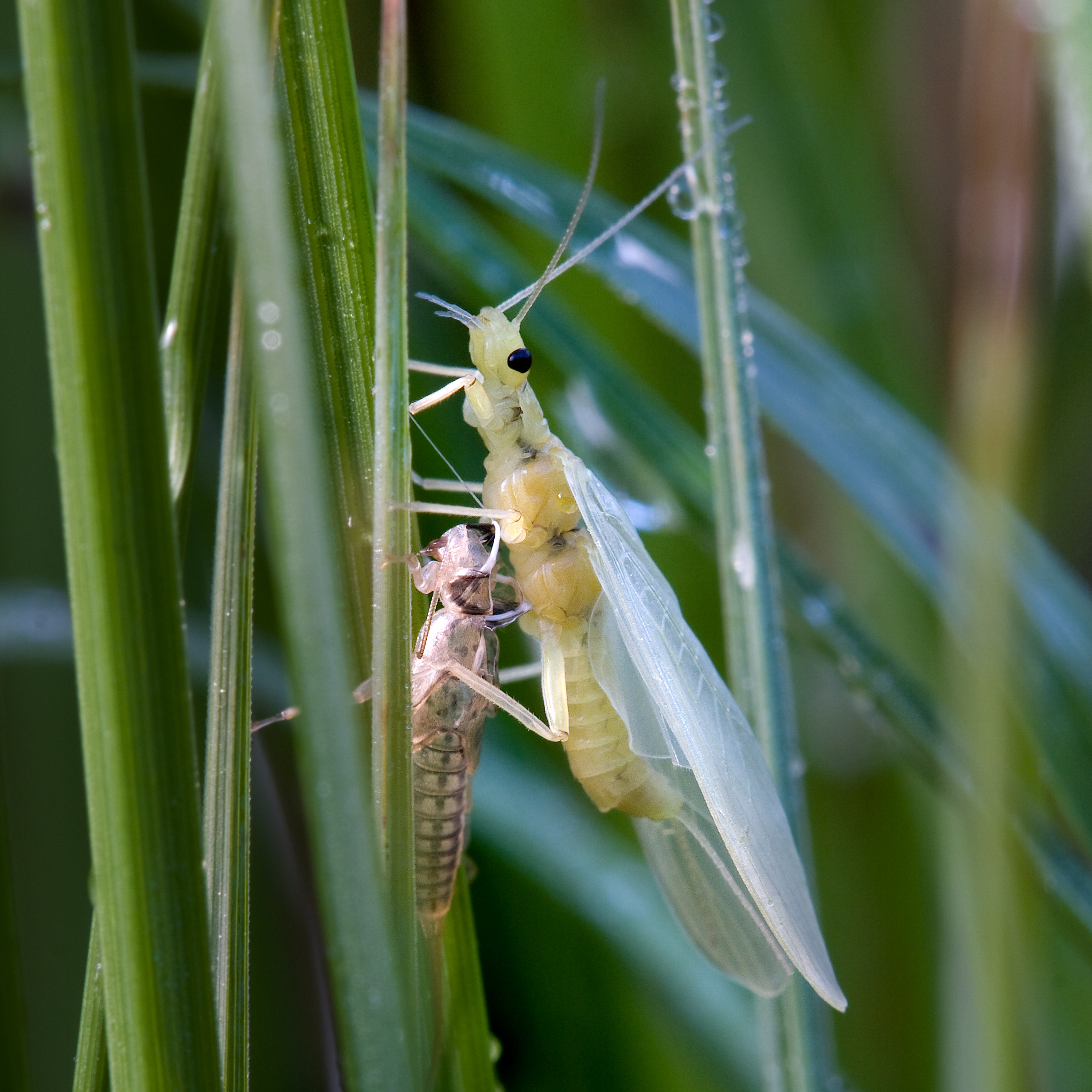
- Isoperla sp

Scientific classification
- Domain: Eukaryota
- Kingdom: Animalia
- Phylum: Arthropoda
- Class: Insecta
- Cohort: Polyneoptera
- Order: Plecoptera
- Superfamily: Perloidea
- Family: Perlodidae

= Perlodidae =

Family of stoneflies

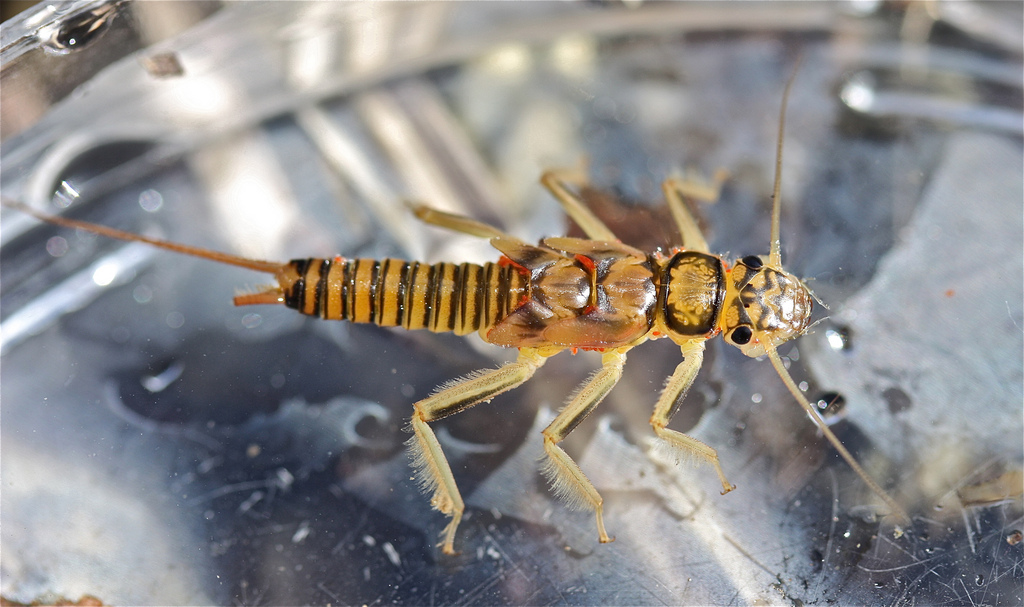
Yugus nymph

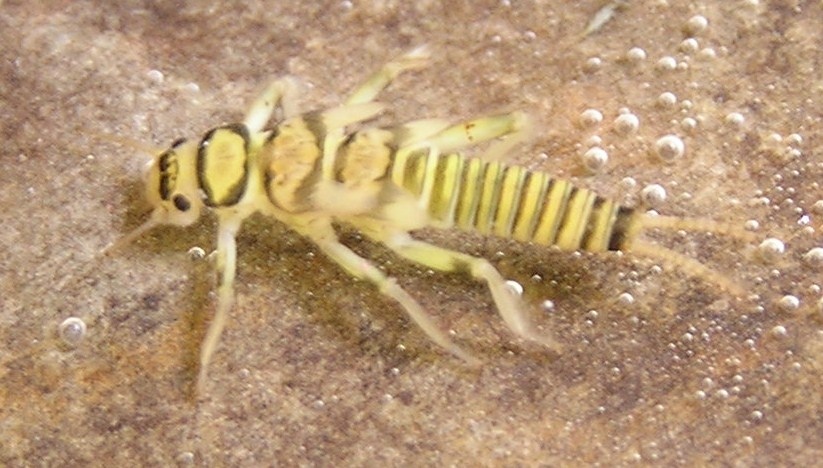
Helopicus subvarians nymph

The Perlodidae, also known as the perlodid stoneflies, stripetails, or springflies, are a family of stoneflies.

== Natural history ==
The family Perlodidae is composed of at least 50 genera and over 350 species, with the fossil records extending at least from the Triassic. The majority of perlodid stoneflies are univoltine - one generation occurs per year. Usually, adults emerge from April to June. Many species have an egg diapause during the warmer months; this allows them to inhabit otherwise unfriendly environments like temporary seeps or streams. Larvae have flattened bodies, often with patterns on their heads and thoraces, long tails, and divergent hind wing pads. Unlike the similar common stoneflies, perlodid larvae do not have branching gills on their thoraces. The perlodids are found throughout North America.

== Habit and habitat ==
The Perlodidae are generally lotic and lentic erosional. These habitats are flowing streams or pools that contain sediments, vascular plants, and detritus. They are most often found in cool, clear streams with rocky bottoms. They are found under rocks and in coarse particulate organic matter where many prey are to be found. The larvae are generally considered to be clingers as can be seen by their wide stance for gripping substrates.

== Functional feeding group ==
The perlodid larvae are mostly predators that engulf their prey, although a few species are scrapers and collector-gatherers. They will eat a variety of small invertebrates, but they are also known to eat plant matter, especially when young.

== Genera ==
Selected genera in the two subfamilies include:

Isoperlinae

- Calliperla Banks, 1948
- Cascadoperla Szczytko & Stewart, 1979
- Cosumnoperla Szczytko & Bottorff, 1987
- Clioperla Needham & Claassen, 1925
- Isoperla Banks, 1906
- Kaszabia Raušer, 1968
- Cosumnoperla Szczytko & Bottorff, 1987

Perlodinae

- Afroperlodes Miron & Zwick, 1973
- Arcynopteryx Klapálek, 1904
- Baumannella Stark & Stewart, 1985
- Besdolus Ricker, 1952
- Bulgaroperla Raušer, 1966
- Chernokrilus Ricker, 1952
- Cultus Ricker, 1952
- Dictyogenus Klapálek, 1904
- Diploperla Needham & Claassen, 1925
- Diura Billberg, 1820
- Filchneria Klapálek, 1908
- Frisonia Ricker, 1943
- Guadalgenus Stark & Gonzalez del Tanago, 1986
- Hedinia Navás, 1936
- Helopicus Ricker, 1952
- Hemimelaena Klapálek, 1907
- Hydroperla Frison, 1935
- Isogenoides Klapálek, 1912
- Isogenus Newman, 1833
- Kogotus Ricker, 1952
- Levanidovia Teslenko & Zhiltzova, 1989
- Malirekus Ricker, 1952
- Megaperlodes Yokoyama, Isobe & Yamamoto, 1990
- Megarcys Klapálek, 1912
- Neofilchneria Zwick, 1973
- Neowuia Li & Murányi, 2017
- Oconoperla Stark & Stewart, 1982
- Oroperla Needham, 1933
- Osobenus Ricker, 1952
- Ostrovus Ricker, 1952
- Perlinodes Needham & Claassen, 1925
- Perlodes Banks, 1903
- Perlodinella Klapálek, 1912
- Pictetiella Illies, 1966
- Protarcys Klapálek, 1912
- Pseudomegarcys Kohno, 1946
- Rauserodes Zwick, 1999
- Remenus Ricker, 1952
- Rickera Jewett, 1954
- Salmoperla Baumann & Lauck, 1987
- Setvena Ricker, 1952
- Skwala Ricker, 1943
- Sopkalia Ricker, 1952
- Stavsolus Ricker, 1952
- Susulus Bottorff & Stewart, 1989
- Tadamus Ricker, 1952
- Yugus Ricker, 1952
- Zhiltzovaia Özdikmen, 2008

Extinct, incertae sedis

- † Derancheperla Sinitshenkova, 1990
- † Isoperlodes Sinitshenkova, 1992
