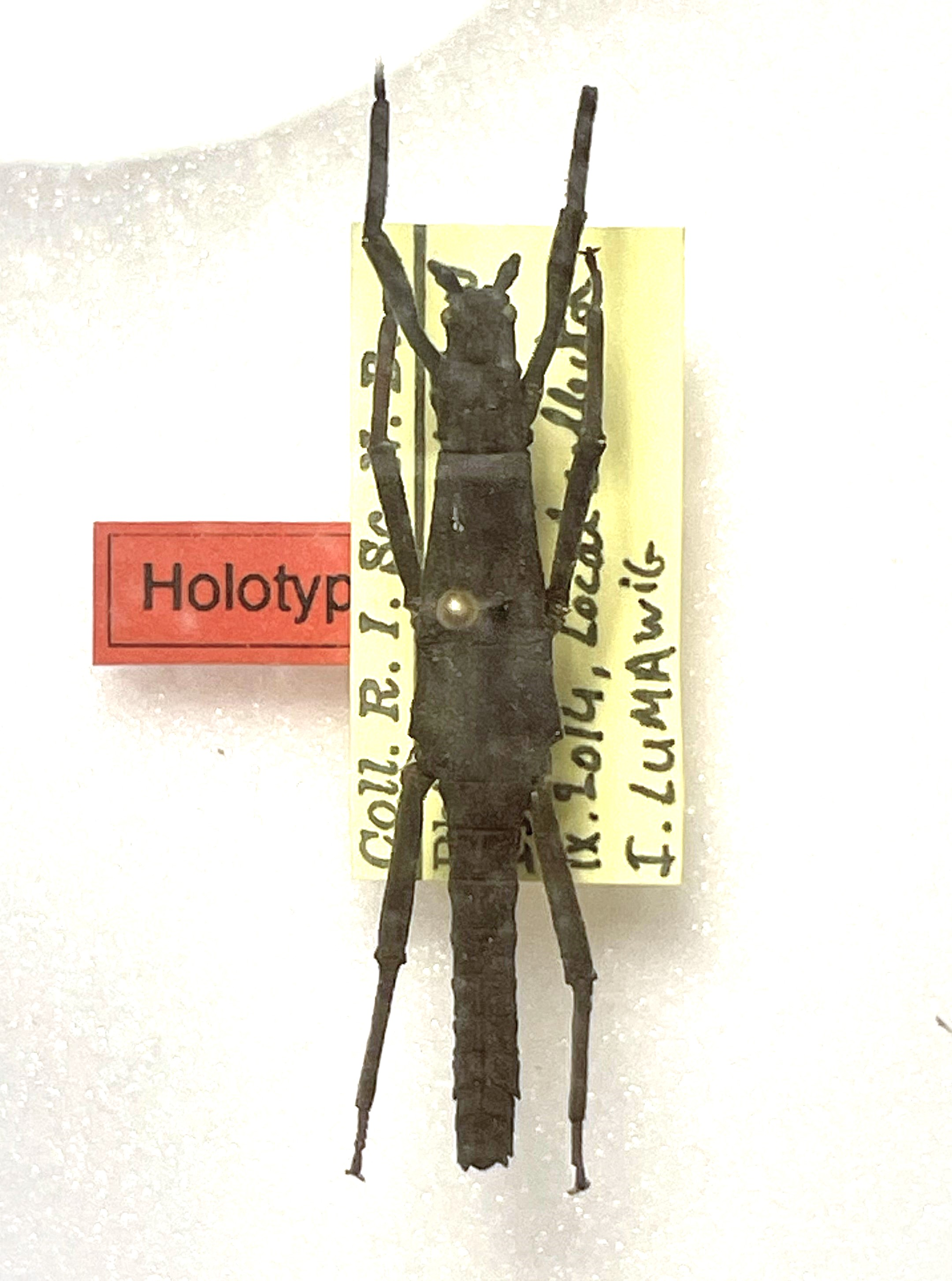
- Tisamenus makinis, male holotype

Scientific classification
- Kingdom: Animalia
- Phylum: Arthropoda
- Clade: Pancrustacea
- Class: Insecta
- Order: Phasmatodea
- Family: Heteropterygidae
- Subfamily: Obriminae
- Tribe: Obrimini
- Genus: Tisamenus
- Species: T. makinis

Binomial name
- Tisamenus makinis Hennemann, 2005

= Tisamenus makinis =

Species of stick insect

Tisamenus makinis is a species of stick insect in the family Heteropterygidae native to the east of Philippine island of Luzon.

== Description ==
Tisamenus makinis is a rather small and completely spineless Tisamenus species. The only described specimen is a male, measuring 30.8 millimetres (1.21 in) in length. It closely resembles that of Tisamenus summaleonilae, but lacks an anterior spine on the pronotum and a pleural spine on the metathorax. As in Tisamenus summaleonilae, the mesonotum and metanotum widen posteriorly, forming a trapezoid. In Tisamenus makinis, not only are the spines completely absent from the body, but the spines on the legs are also almost completely reduced. The triangle on the mesonotum, typical of the genus, is clearly raised. Its outer ridges are very poorly developed, flat, and barely recognizable. It shares the reduced body spines with Tisamenus kalahani, although Tisamenus makinis has a significantly more compact overall shape and lacks the large spines on the anterior edge of the pronotum (pronotale) present in Tisamenus kalahani. Furthermore, the edges of the triangle on the mesonotum are significantly more pronounced in Tisamenus kalahani, and its mesonotum and metanotum run parallel.

== Distribution, discovery and taxonomy ==
The only known specimen of this species comes from the province of Isabela in eastern Luzon, where it was collected by Ismael Lumawig in Didin in September 2014. This specimen, later in the collection of the Museum of Natural Sciences in Brussels, was examined by Frank H. Hennemann as part of a taxonomic revision of the genus Tisamenus and described as Tisamenus makinis in 2025. After the species description, the specimen was deposited as the holotype at the Museum of Natural Sciences in Brussels. The species name "makinis" chosen by Hennemann means "smooth" in Filipino and refers to the reduced body structures of this slender and smooth species.
