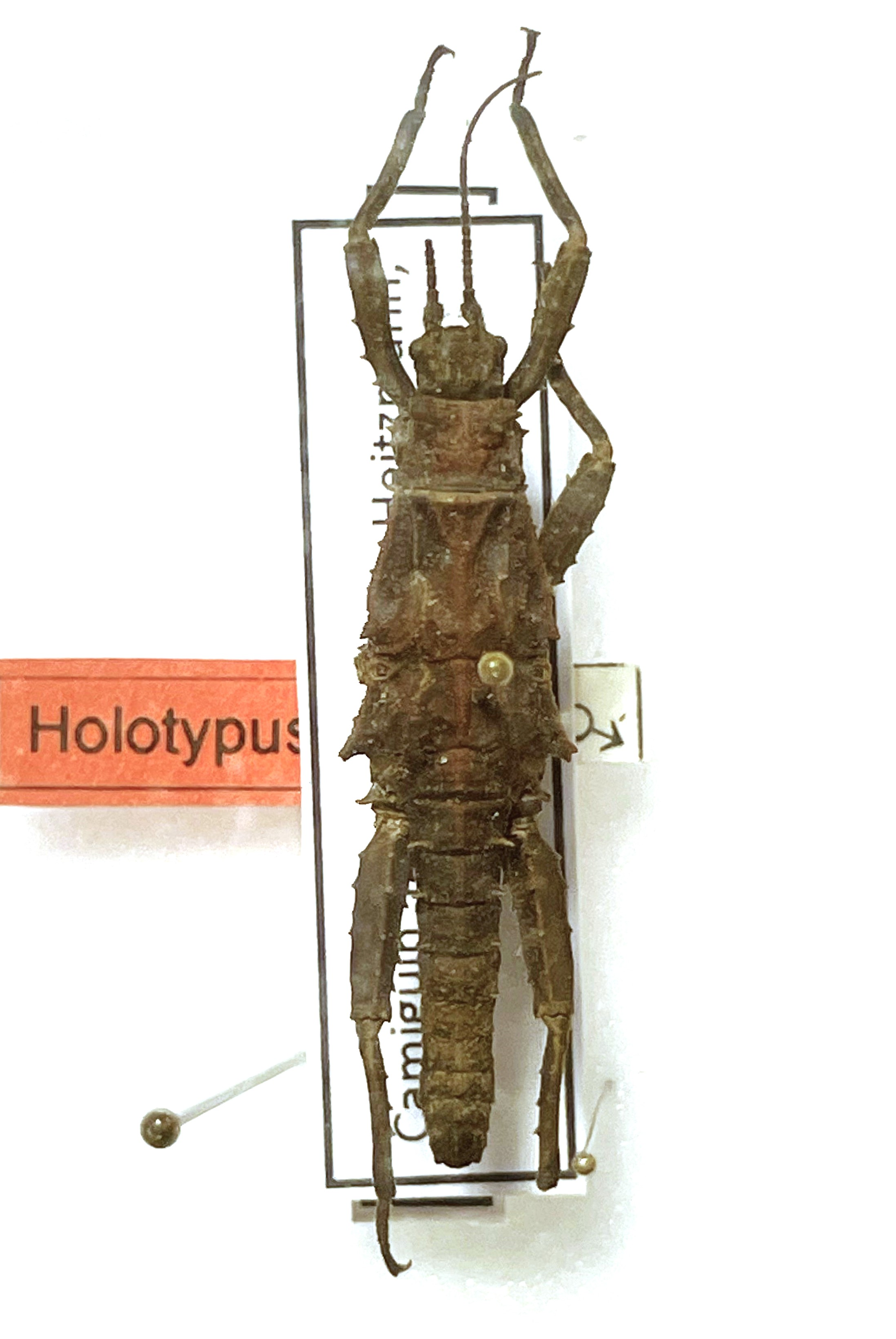
- Tisamenus malawak, male holotype

Scientific classification
- Kingdom: Animalia
- Phylum: Arthropoda
- Clade: Pancrustacea
- Class: Insecta
- Order: Phasmatodea
- Family: Heteropterygidae
- Subfamily: Obriminae
- Tribe: Obrimini
- Genus: Tisamenus
- Species: T. malawak

Binomial name
- Tisamenus malawak Hennemann, 2025

= Tisamenus malawak =

Species of stick insect

Tisamenus malawak is a species of stick insect in the family Heteropterygidae native to the Philippine island of Camiguin.

== Description ==
Tisamenus malawak is a small and stocky Tisamenus species. The only described male is 29 millimetres (1.1 in) long. Morphologically, it resembles Tisamenus alviolanus from Negros and Tisamenus cervicornis from Luzon, but can be distinguished from these two species, as well as from all other Tisamenus species, by its very broad basal shape. Its mesothorax is significantly shorter than it is wide at the posterior edge. The head and body structure are poorly developed. The pleural spines above the coxae on the meso- and metanotum (meso- and metapleural supraoxals) are directed approximately 45° backwards.

== Distribution ==
Tisamenus malawak is the southernmost Tisamenus species. According to the collection label, the only known specimen to date comes from the island of Camiguin, north of Mindanao. According to Albert Kang, who collected the specimen on January 20, 2014, it comes from Mindanao, but this could also mean that it comes from the Mindanao island group, to which Camiguin belongs.

== Taxonomy ==
Frank H. Hennemann described the species in 2025 as part of a taxonomic revision of the genus Tisamenus based on a single male. This specimen, originally from the collection of Thies H. Büscher in Kiel, was deposited as the holotype in the Zoological Museum of Kiel University (ZMK) after its description. Büscher had received it from Thierry Heitzmann and Albert Kang. The species name "malawak" chosen by Hennemann means "broad" or "wide" in Filipino and refers to the remarkably stocky physique of this small species, in which the mesothorax is significantly shorter than the width of this segment at its posterior edge.

Sarah Bank et al. also included 14 samples from various species of the genus Tisamenus in their 2021 study on the relationships within the Heteropterygidae, based on genetic analyses. Among them was a sample from the still undescribed Tisamenus malawak, then known as Tisamenus sp. 9 (Camiguin). For this purpose, the left midleg of the later holotype, still in Büscher's collection, was removed to extract DNA from it. The results showed that Tisamenus malawak is the sister species of Tisamenus hystrix and, together with this species and Tisamenus clotho, Tisamenus cervicornis and the even newly described Tisamenus heitzmanni (see cladogram of Tisamenus).
