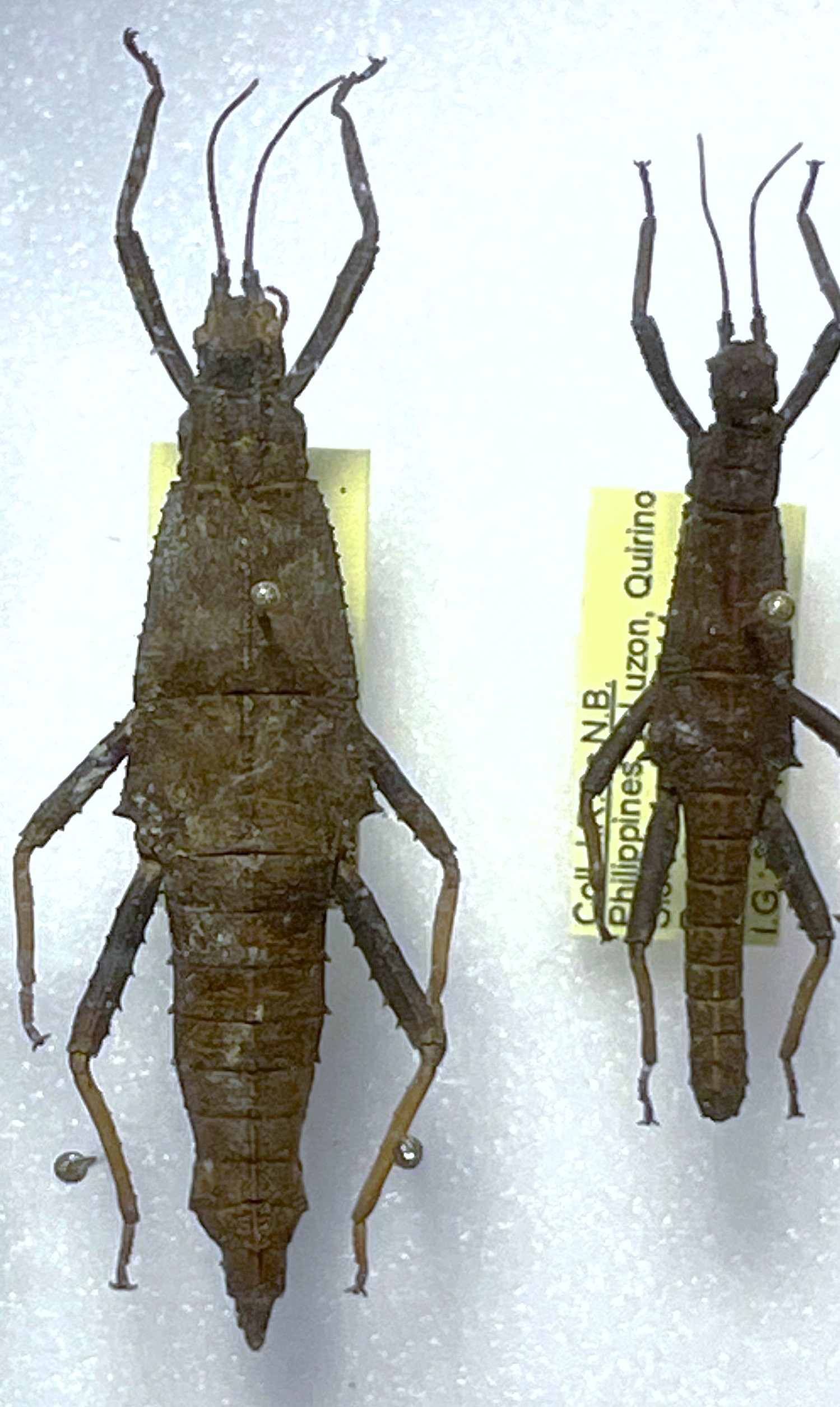
- Tisamenus trapezoides, female and male paratypes from the RBINS

Scientific classification
- Kingdom: Animalia
- Phylum: Arthropoda
- Clade: Pancrustacea
- Class: Insecta
- Order: Phasmatodea
- Family: Heteropterygidae
- Subfamily: Obriminae
- Tribe: Obrimini
- Genus: Tisamenus
- Species: T. trapezoides

Binomial name
- Tisamenus trapezoides Hennemann, 2025

= Tisamenus trapezoides =

Species of stick insect

Tisamenus trapezoides is a species of stick insect in the family Heteropterygidae native to the Philippine island of Luzon.

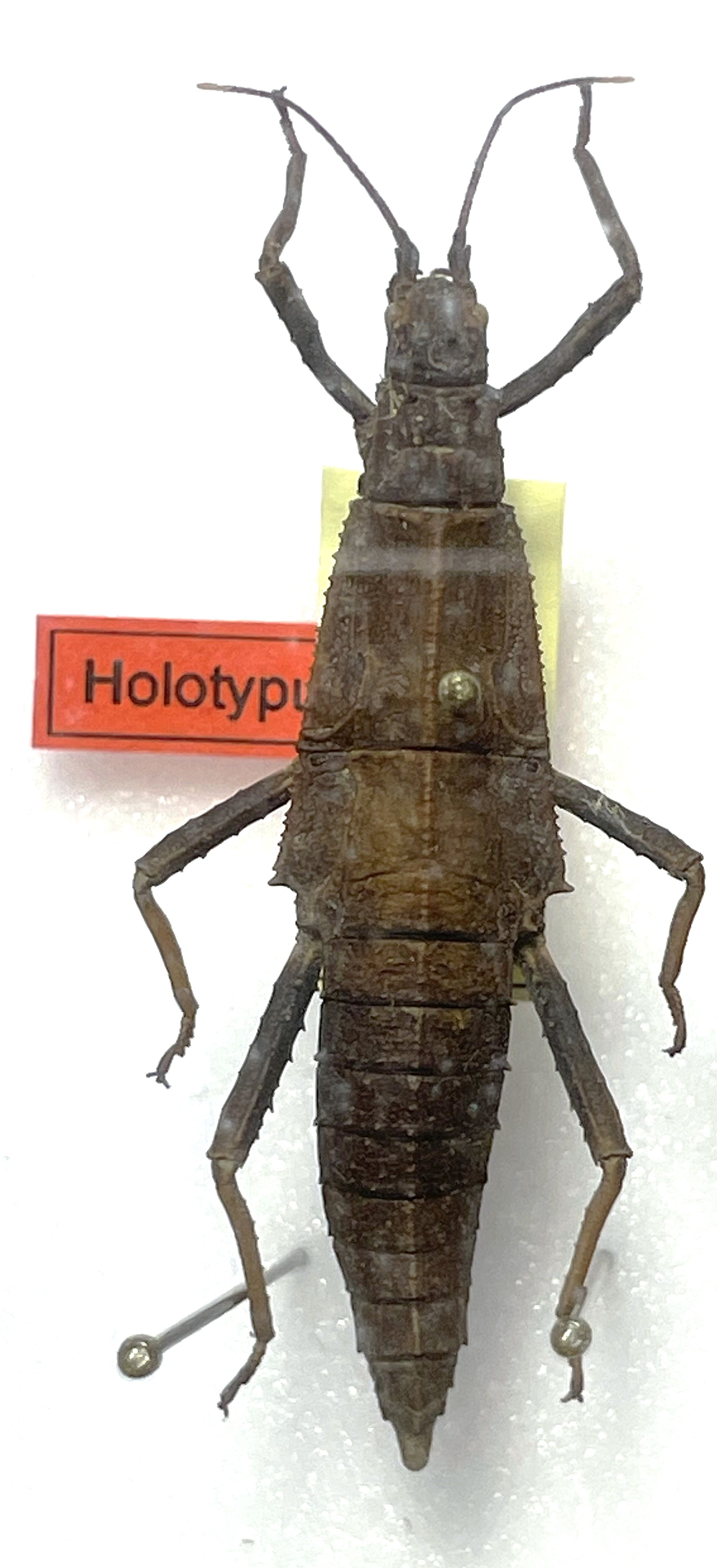
The holotype from the RBINS

== Description ==
Tisamenus irenoliti is a relatively small and sparsely spined Tisamenus species. The meso- and metathorax in both sexes are typical, broadening strongly and evenly towards the rear. These segments are merely granulated along their lateral edges, although this granulation is somewhat less pronounced in males. Above the coxae of the hind legs, the metapleura taper at the posterior angle to form a prominent, strong, but blunt metapleural spine. The triangle on the mesonotum, typical of this genus, is significantly reduced and quickly lost. The first segment of the antennae, the scapus, has a dentiform apical protrusion on the exterior lateral edge.

The approximately 42 millimetres (1.7 in) long females share these characteristics with the similarly sized and morphologically similar females of Tisamenus ranarius. As with these, the posterolateral area of the terga of the abdomen have small spikes. In contrast to Tisamenus ranarius, the meso- and metathorax of the females of Tisamenus trapezoides are more broadly expanded and their pleurae are more tubercled or more pointed at the metapleurae. The suborbital spines on the head are larger and more conical. On the pronotum, there is a more prominent, triangular area. The keel, which extends lengthwise across the meso- and metanotum and most of the abdomen as well, is much more pronounced. The femura are significantly more spiny than in the female of Tisamenus ranarius. The tibiae, especially of the middle and hind legs, are ochre to clay colored.

The only known male of Tisamenus trapezoides is 32.8 millimetres (1.29 in) long. As with the females, it also has a distinctive longitudinal keel extending from the mesonotum across its body. The tibiae of its legs are also strikingly ochre to clay colored. A comparison with the males of Tisamenus ranarius is not possible, as their males are not yet known. Morphologically, the males are somewhat similar to those of the larger Tisamenus deplanatus and Tisamenus cervicornis. Compared to these, the supraorbital spines of Tisamenus trapezoides are more conical and stronger. They also lack the paired spines on the anterior abdominal segments. The paired spine, which in Tisamenus trapezoides is merely a simple, medium-sized spine on the pronotum, is much larger and two- or three-toothed in Tisamenus deplanatus and Tisamenus cervicornis.

== Occurrence, discovery and taxonomy ==
The three previously known specimens were collected by Ismael O. Lumawig in February 2014. Lumawig has already collected many, often still unknown, species in the Philippines, which is why the stick insects Eubulides lumawigi and Phobaeticus lumawigi were named after him. All three specimens are adult and were found in the north of the Quirino province in the Sierra Madre Mountain range on the island of Luzon. They were donated to the Museum of Natural Sciences in Brussels by Bruno Kneubühler. This provided the animals to Frank H. Hennemann for a taxonomic study of the genus Tisamenus. Hennemann described the species in 2025 and chose the species name "tapezoides" because of the characteristic shape of the meso- and metathorax, which broaden strongly and evenly towards the back and together form a trapezoidal unit. The slightly smaller of the two females is deposited as the holotype, the other female and the male as paratypes in the Museum of Natural Sciences in Brussels.
