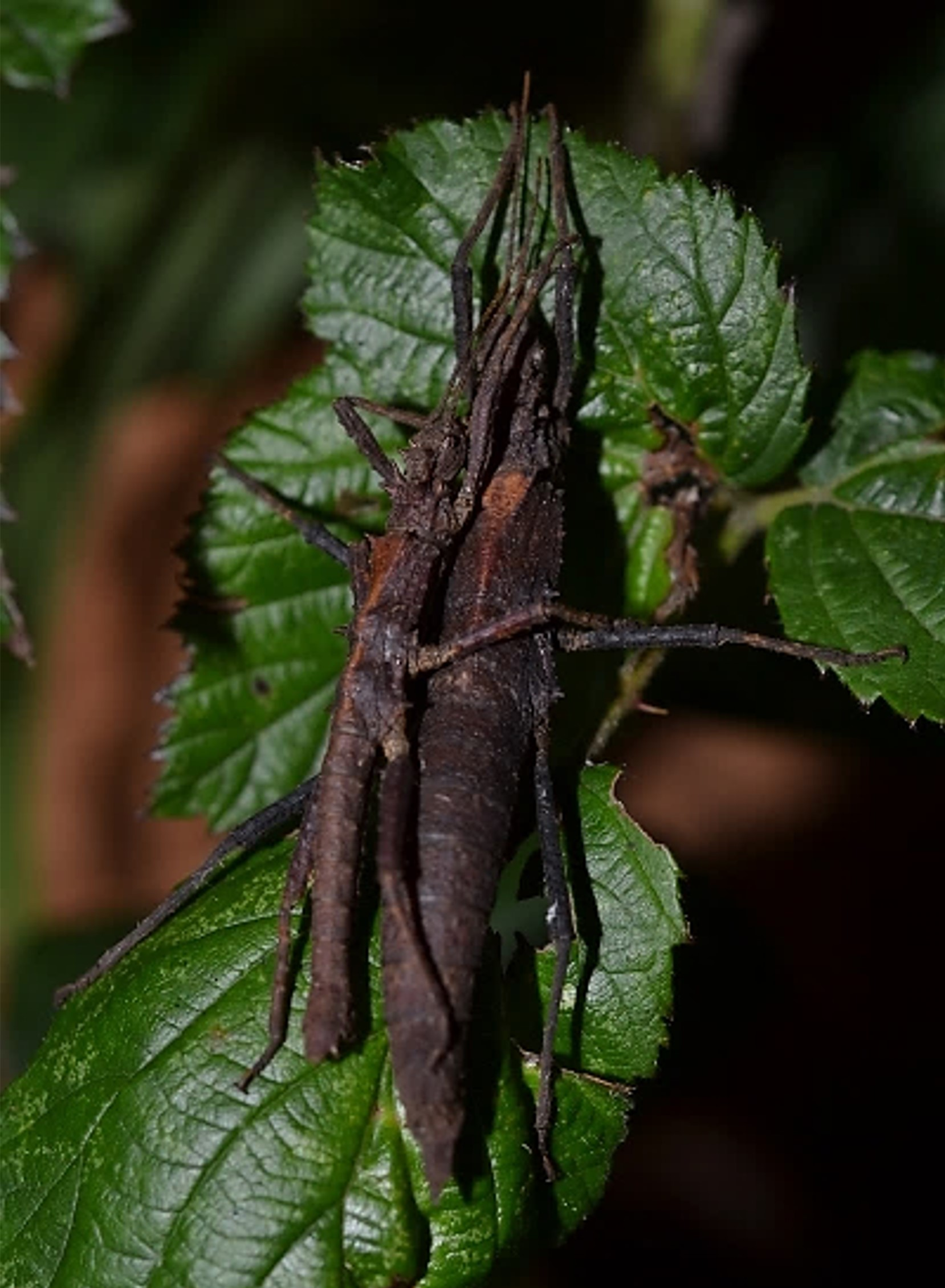
- Tisamenus charestae, pair from Ifugao

Scientific classification
- Kingdom: Animalia
- Phylum: Arthropoda
- Clade: Pancrustacea
- Class: Insecta
- Order: Phasmatodea
- Family: Heteropterygidae
- Subfamily: Obriminae
- Tribe: Obrimini
- Genus: Tisamenus
- Species: T. charestae

Binomial name
- Tisamenus charestae Hennemann & Le Tirant, 2025

= Tisamenus charestae =

Species of stick insect

Tisamenus charestae is a species of stick insect in the family Heteropterygidae native to the Philippine island of Luzon.

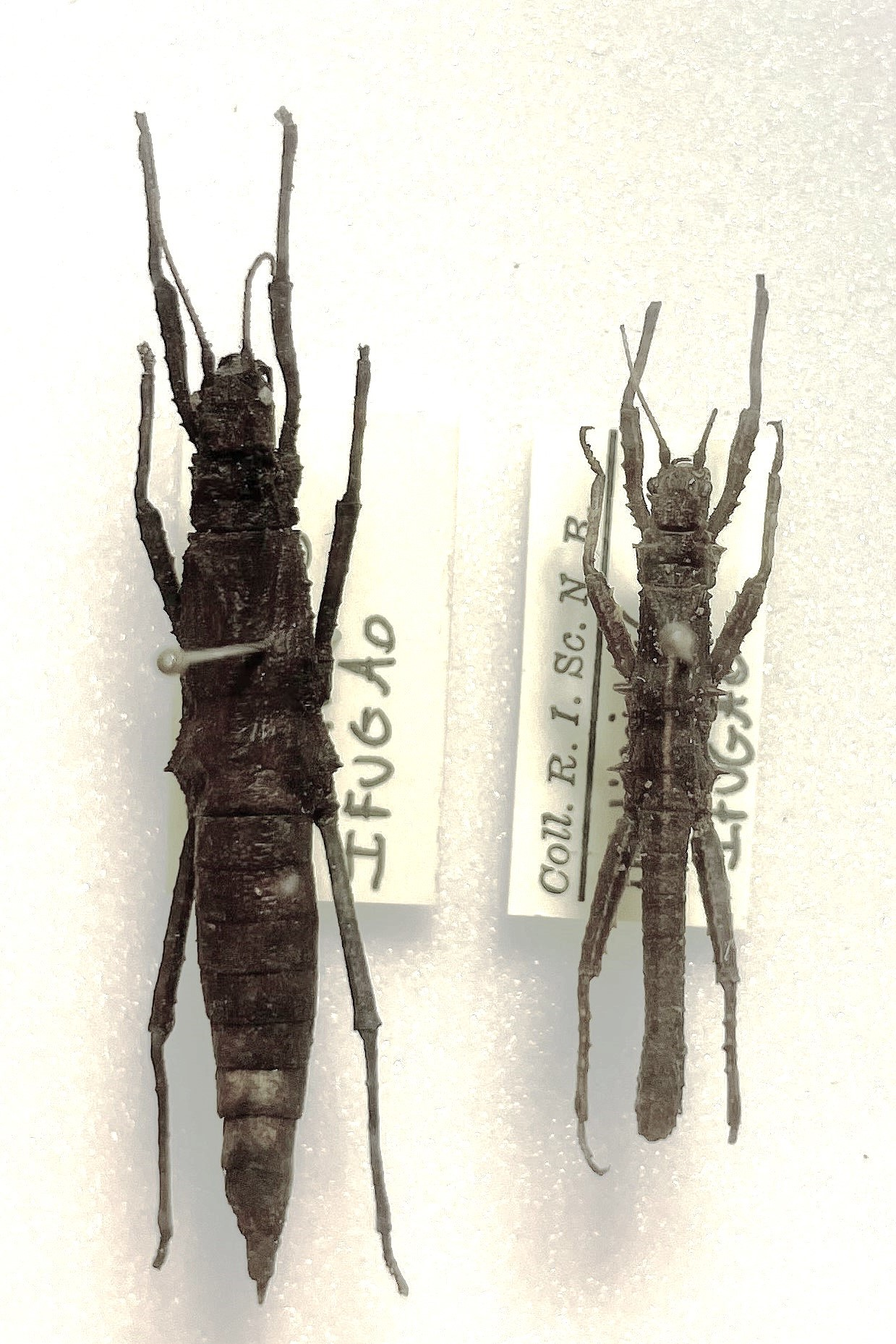
Paratypes from the collection of IRSNB

== Description ==
Tisamenus charestae is a comparatively small, slender, and sparsely spined Tisamenus species. They resemble the somewhat larger and slender Tisamenus polillo. Males of Tisamenus charestae have stronger and less sharp spines above the hips (supracoxalia) on the pleurae of the meso- and metathorax. They also have two large spines of approximately equal size on the anterior pronotum (pronotals). In Tisamenus polillo have three pronotal spines, with the posterior spines becoming smaller. Males of Tisamenus charestae reach a length of 29.6 to 30.7 millimetres (1.17 to 1.21 in). The almost spineless females reach a length of 38 to 43 millimetres (1.5 to 1.7 in). They differ from those of Tisamenus polillo in the significantly shorter, conical and more tuberous than spiny supracoxalia of the mesopleurae and metapleurae, which are more spiny in Tisamenus polillo. Terga one to four of the abdomen have only small, paired tubercles and no spines like in Tisamenus polillo. The lower part of the ovipositor, known as the subgenital plate, extends over the upper part, the epiproct, by more than half its length. The eggs are 3.3 millimetres (0.13 in) long, 3.1 millimetres (0.12 in) wide, and 1.9 millimetres (0.075 in) high. A characteristic feature is the small micropylar plate, which, at 2.1 millimetres (0.083 in), is only about two-thirds the length of the capsule. The three processes of the micropylar plate are quite short and, as is typical for the genus, form an inverted Y.

== Distribution ==
The species has so far only been found in the province of Ifugao in northern Luzon, where it was collected in the Cordillera Central Mountains at an altitude of 1,750 metres (5,740 ft).

== Taxonomy ==
The species was described as one of seven new species in a taxonomic revision of the genus Tisamenus. In addition to Frank H. Hennemann, the author of the revision, Stéphane Le Tirant, the long-time curator of the scientific collection of the Montreal Insectarium (IMQC), is also a co-author of the species description. The species name is dedicated to Sonya Charest, who headed the educational department of the Montreal Insectarium for over 30 years and was a long-time colleague and friend of Le Tirant. A female was selected as the holotype, which, along with a male and two other female paratypes, is deposited at the Montreal Insectarium. All three specimens were found on March 24, 2021, on the Cambulo trail in the Cordillera Central Mountains at an altitude of 1,750 metres (5,740 ft). Almost all other paratypes also originate from this location and time. This applies to a pair deposited at the Museum of Natural Sciences in Brussels, as well as seven females, two males, and one egg in Hennemann's specimen collection. Only one pair from the collection of Thies H. Büscher was collected by Thierry Heitzmann in 2014. Its location is given only as Ifugao.

== Terraristics ==
Heitzmann and Albert Kang collected specimens of this species in October 2013. Dutchman Rob Krijns conducted breeding attempts with a pair of this species in 2014, but these attempts were unsuccessful. The specimens were later deposited in the collection of the Museum of Natural Sciences in Brussels.
