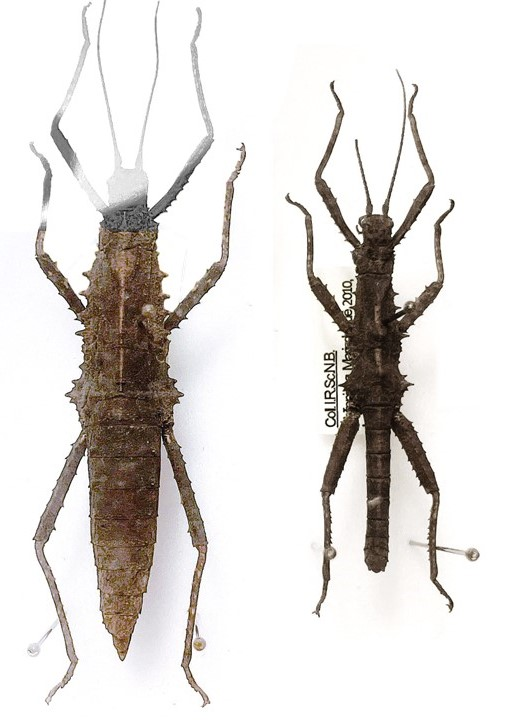
- Tisamenus irenoliti, left female holotype, right male paratype

Scientific classification
- Kingdom: Animalia
- Phylum: Arthropoda
- Clade: Pancrustacea
- Class: Insecta
- Order: Phasmatodea
- Family: Heteropterygidae
- Subfamily: Obriminae
- Tribe: Obrimini
- Genus: Tisamenus
- Species: T. irenoliti

Binomial name
- Tisamenus irenoliti Hennemann, 2025

= Tisamenus irenoliti =

Species of stick insect

Tisamenus irenoliti is a species of stick insect in the family Heteropterygidae native to the Philippine island of Marinduque.

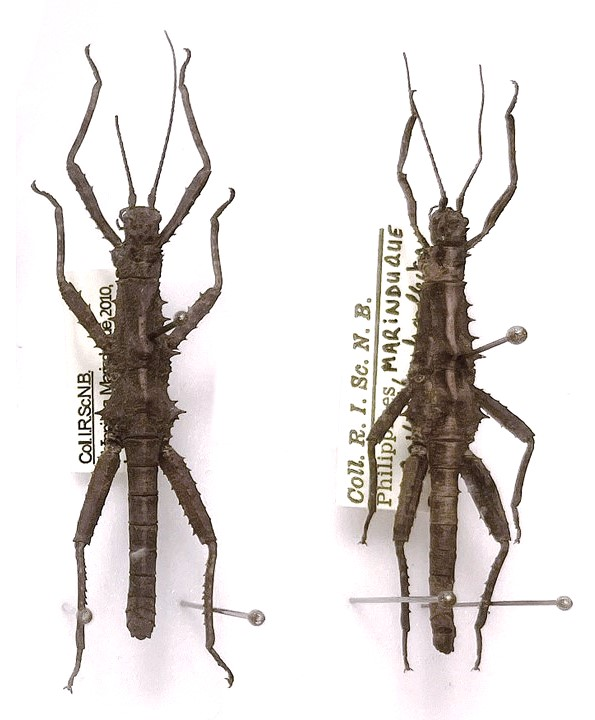
The two male paratypes from the RBINS

== Description ==
Tisamenus irenoliti is a medium-sized Tisamenus species. Due to its elongated body shape, the species resembles Tisamenus lachesis and Tisamenus polillo, native to Luzon and Polillo Islands.

Males of Tisamenus irenoliti reach a length of 38.7 to 39 millimetres (1.52 to 1.54 in), making them smaller and somewhat stockier overall. Their mesothorax is more trapezoidal and gradually widens posteriorly. They lack the enlarged spine found in Tisamenus lachesis at the two anterior corners of the mesothorax triangle typical of the genus. This triangle is significantly shorter than half the length of the mesonotum. The femura and tibiae of the hind legs have more numerous, more distinct, and more pointed ventral teeth.

The only known adult female Tisamenus irenoliti is 54.7 millimetres (2.15 in) long. It differs from Tisamenus lachesis females in the weakly developed or absent anterior pleural spine and the curved edges of the triangle on the mesonotum, which lacks the spiny, extended anterior corners. As in the males, there are more pronounced teeth on the tibiae of the hind legs and larger teeth on the edges of the foreleg femurs. The female is somewhat stockier than those of Tisamenus polillo and has four pleural spines on the mesothorax, whereas Tisamenus polillo has only three. In this female, too, the generic triangle does not extend to the middle of the mesonotum. There are two pronounced spines on the metapleurae, which are missing in the females of Tisamenus polillo. Overall, the pleural spines on the mesonotum and metanotum, as well as the head and body structures, are blunt and cone-like rather than pointed and spiny. The second known, but still juvenile female is 45 millimetres (1.8 in) long and is presumably in the penultimate stage. Its body structures are significantly more pointed and spiny than those of the described adult female. Similar to Tisamenus polillo, their appearance could also vary greatly in Tisamenus irenoliti.

== Occurrence, discovery and taxonomy ==
The four previously known specimens were found on the island of Marinduque. The first, a female in the penultimate developmental stage, was found in March 2009 by Eric Oria, after whom the leaf insect species Phyllium ericoriai is named, in the east of the island in Barangay Cawit, part of the municipality of Boac. An adult pair was found by local collectors in 2010, and another adult male was found in February 2014 by Ismael Lumawig, after whom the stick insect species Eubulides lumawigi and Phobaeticus lumawigi were named. No precise location information is available for the three adults. Frank H. Hennemann examined all four specimens as part of a taxonomic revision of the genus Tisamenus and described them as Tisamenus irenoliti in 2025. The three adults were deposited at the Museum of Natural Sciences in Brussels, where they had been before their processing and species description by Hennemann. The female was designated as the holotype, the males as paratypes. The juvenile female, which came from Hennemann's specimen collection, is deposited in it as the paratype. The species name "irenoliti" chosen by Hennemann is named after Ireno L. Lit Jr., who is an assistant professor at the Institute of Forest Biology and entomological curator at the University of the Philippines at Los Baños (UPLB). He is known for his achievements in researching the biodiversity of Philippine stick insects and has, among other species, described three Tisamenus species.
