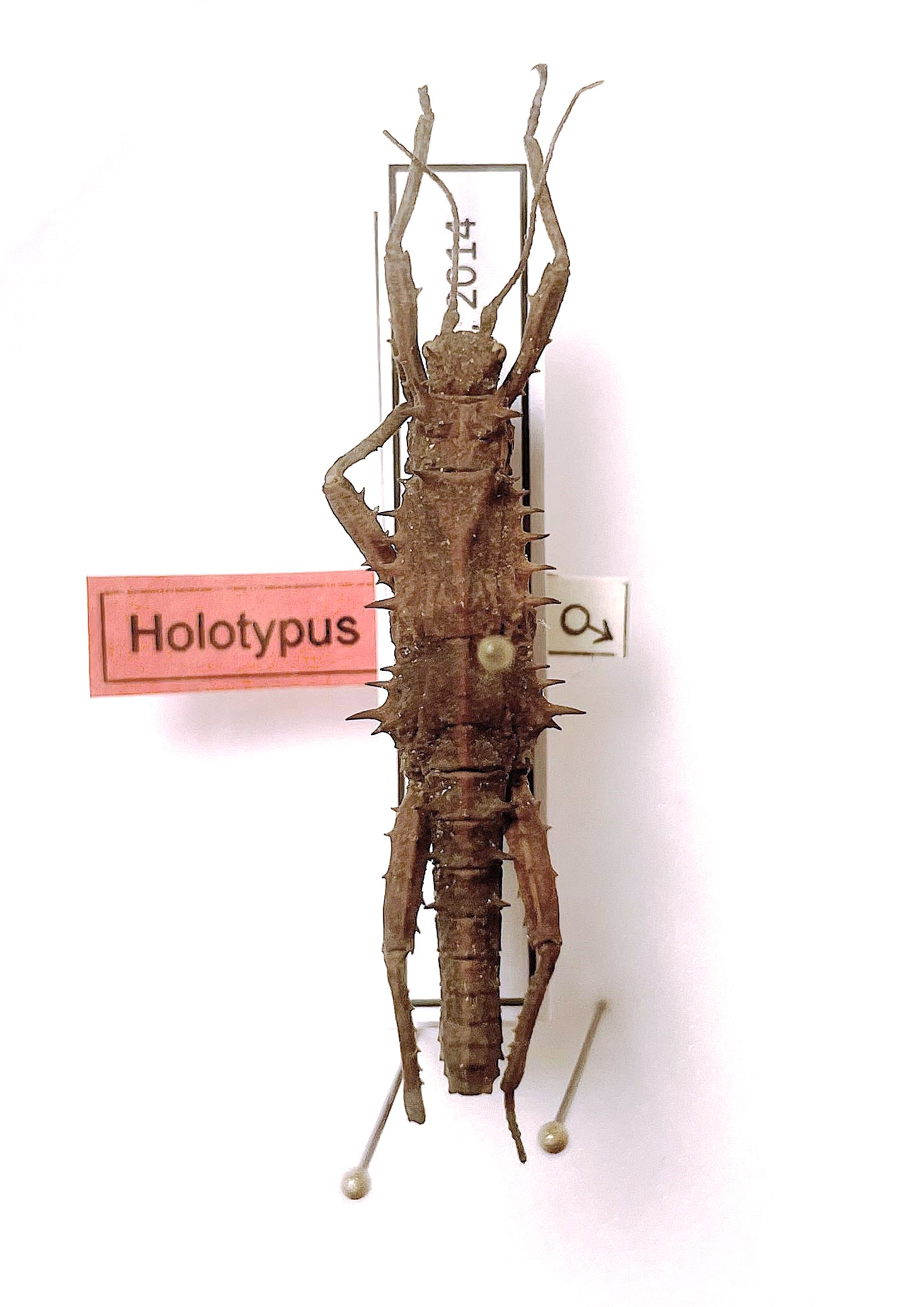
- Tisamenus heitzmanni, male holotype

Scientific classification
- Kingdom: Animalia
- Phylum: Arthropoda
- Clade: Pancrustacea
- Class: Insecta
- Order: Phasmatodea
- Family: Heteropterygidae
- Subfamily: Obriminae
- Tribe: Obrimini
- Genus: Tisamenus
- Species: T. heitzmanni

Binomial name
- Tisamenus heitzmanni Hennemann, 2025

= Tisamenus heitzmanni =

Species of stick insect

Tisamenus heitzmanni is a species of stick insect in the family Heteropterygidae native to the Philippine island of Cebu.

== Description ==
Tisamenus heitzmanni is a small Tisamenus species. The only described male is 32.3 millimetres (1.27 in) long. They resemble those of the slightly larger Tisamenus hystrix, but are more stocky and have relatively shorter body segments. The mesonotum is only twice as long as it is wide, whereas in Tisamenus hystrix it is almost 2.5 times as long. The mesothorax widens posteriorly and has six very strong mesopleural spines instead of the five in Tisamenus hystrix. Unlike in the males of Tisamenus hystrix, there are no distinct pairs of spines on the posterior margin of the meso- and metanotum, nor on the first segment of the abdomen, which is firmly attached to the metathorax, the so called median segment, nor on the fifth tergum of the abdomen. Only the second to fourth abdominal segments each has a distinct pair of spines.

On the pronotum, similar to Tisamenus hystrix, both sexes have a pair of conspicuous, obliquely directed double spines, directed forwards and laterally. The triangle on the metanotum, typical of the genus, is not as prominent in these species as in Tisamenus hystrix, but also has spines at the two anterior corners, albeit smaller.

== Distribution ==
Tisamenus heitzmanni is the only known Tisamenus species from the island of Cebu. No precise location information is available for the holotype. Photographs of a female belonging to this species were taken in the Nug-as Forest Reserve near Alcoy in southern Cebu.

== Taxonomy ==
Frank H. Hennemann described the species in 2025 as part of a taxonomic revision of the genus Tisamenus based on a single male. This specimen, originally from the collection of Thies H. Büscher in Kiel, was deposited as the holotype in the Zoological Museum of Kiel University (ZMK) after its description. Büscher had received it from Albert Kang, who had collected it on June 1, 2014, in Cebu. Hennemann dedicated the species name to Thierry Heitzmann, a friend of Kang, for his great efforts in search for stick insects throughout the Philippines and providing numerous breeding strains among European breeders.

Sarah Bank et al. also included 14 samples from various species of the genus Tisamenus in their 2021 study on the relationships within the Heteropterygidae, based on genetic analyses. Among them was a sample from the still undescribed Tisamenus heitzmanni, then known as Tisamenus sp. 8 (Cebu). For this purpose, the right midleg of the later holotype, still in Büscher's collection, was removed to extract DNA from it. The results showed that Tisamenus heitzmanni is the sister species of a group of other species, including Tisamenus clotho, Tisamenus cervicornis, Tisamenus hystrix, and the even newly described Tisamenus malawak (see cladogram of Tisamenus).
