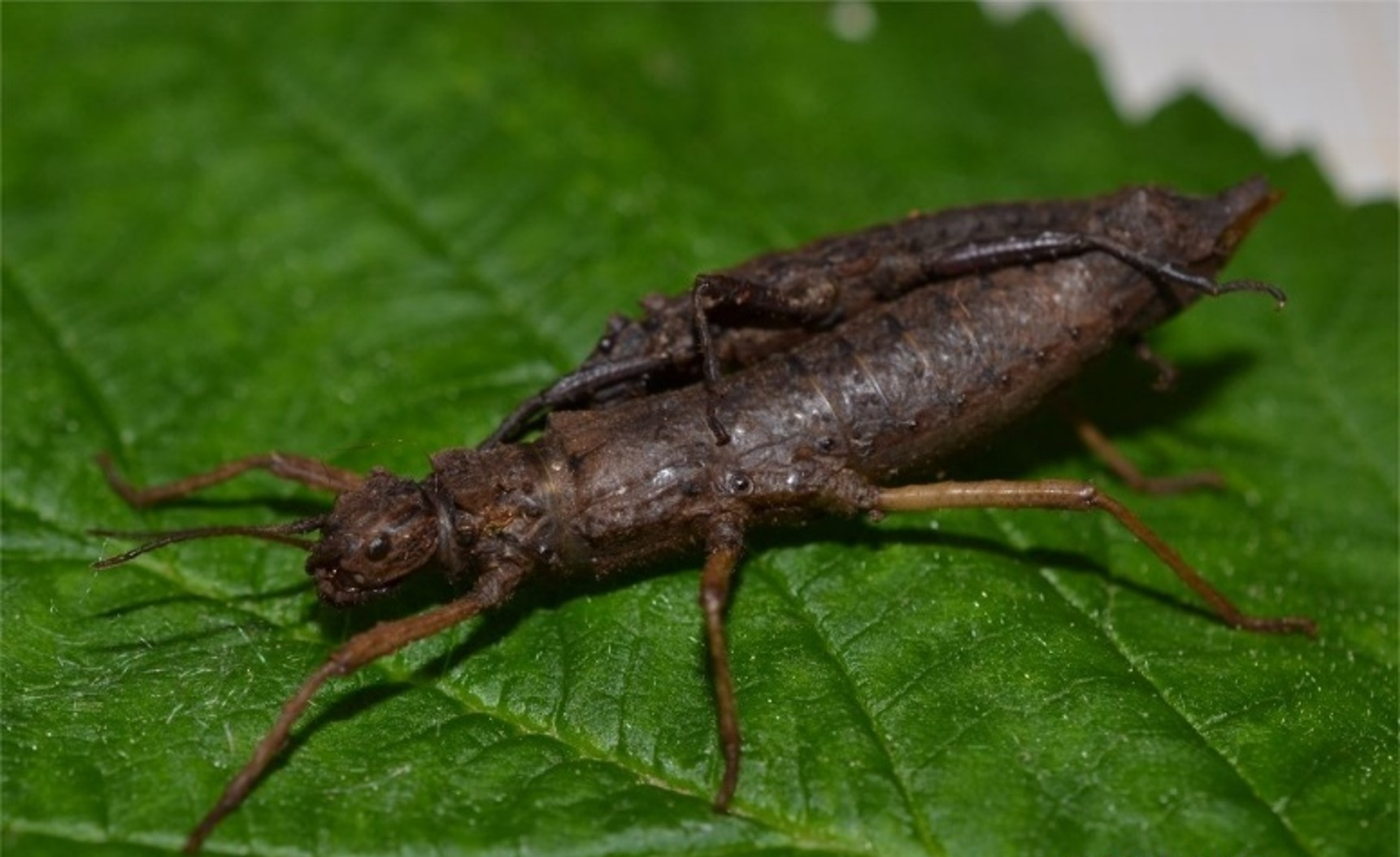
- Tisamenus hebardi, pair

Scientific classification
- Kingdom: Animalia
- Phylum: Arthropoda
- Clade: Pancrustacea
- Class: Insecta
- Order: Phasmatodea
- Family: Heteropterygidae
- Subfamily: Obriminae
- Tribe: Obrimini
- Genus: Tisamenus
- Species: T. hebardi

Binomial name
- Tisamenus hebardi (Rehn & Rehn, 1939)

Synonyms
- Ilocano hebardi Rehn & Rehn, 1939

= Tisamenus hebardi =

Species of stick insect

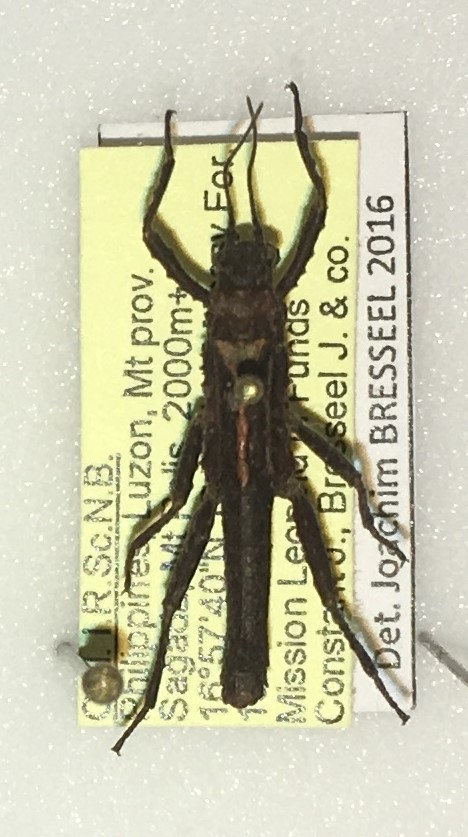
male from the collection of Museum of Natural Sciences

Tisamenus hebardi is a stick insect species (Phasmatodea), in the family of the Heteropterygidae endemic to the north of the Philippine island of Luzon.

== Description ==
The species is considered the smallest of the genus Tisamenus. The very stocky animals are characterized by short and very thin legs. Females reach a length of 30 millimetres (1.2 in). There is only a postorbital crest on the rectangular head, while supraorbital spines are absent. The first segment of the antennae, the scapus, is triangular while the remaining segments are cylindrical. The mesonotum is very weakly longitudinally keeled and shows paired, convergent keels in the posterior third. The mesopleurae and metapleurae are slightly expanded posteriorly. The tergites of the abdomen show a more prominent longitudinal crest towards the end. The ovipositor is short and beak-shaped. Its upper part, the epiproct, slightly surpasses the lower part, the subgenital plate known as the operculum.

Although males have been known since 2013, they have not yet been described and measured.

== Taxonomy ==
James Abram Garfield Rehn and his son John William Holman Rehn described the species in 1939 under the basionym Ilocano hebardi in the genus Ilocano established at the same time. The generic name refers to the Ilocano people, a Filipino Ethnicity from the Ilocos Region on the island of Luzon, whose language is called Ilocano. The female used for the species description was collected by E. H. Taylor in July 1923 in Baguio in the province of Benguet and thus outside the actual Ilocos Region. It was deposited in the collection of Morgan Hebard, in whose honor the species is named, and is now deposited as holotype in the Academy of Natural Sciences of Drexel University in Philadelphia. The species Heterocopus ranarius (now Tisamenus ranarius), which was transferred to the genus Ilocano at the same time, was transferred to the genus Tisamenus by Oliver Zompro in 2004, while Ilocano hebardi remained there until 2021. Sarah Bank et al proved by genetic analysis of a male collected in 2014 and deposited in the Museum of Natural Sciences in Brussels that Ilocano hebardi also belongs to Tisamenus. Since the species was the only one left in this genus, Ilocano has been considered a synonym of Tisamenus since the publication of the work in 2021.

== Rediscovery, way of life and breeding attempts ==
In October 2013, after ninety years of no further finds known apart from the holotype, Albert Kang and Thierry Heitzmann collected several specimens of both sexes during two collecting trip in the cloud forest near the summit of Mount Polis in the province of Ifugao at an altitude of approximately 2,000 metres (6,600 ft). The animals were found feeding on very low plants near the ground at night. The temperature was about 12 to 14 °C (54 to 57 °F). The smaller males are more numerous and active than the females, which are more difficult to find near the ground. The breeding attempts carried out by Heitzmann in Manila in the refrigerator were just as unsuccessful as the efforts made by Bruno Kneubühler with adult specimens from the second collection trip sent to Switzerland. In April 2014, Heitzmann led Joachim Bresseel and Jérôme Constant to the site on Mount Polis, where other specimens were found and brought alive to Europe. The animals brought along were classified as Tisamenus sp. 'Ifugao' and later named as Ilocano hebardi 'Sagada'. The breeding attempts by Rob Krijns in the Netherlands with these animals were also unsuccessful. The collected animals are deposited in the Museum of Natural Sciences in Brussels.
