= Tisamenus summaleonilae =

Scientific classification
- Kingdom: Animalia
- Phylum: Arthropoda
- Clade: Pancrustacea
- Class: Insecta
- Order: Phasmatodea
- Family: Heteropterygidae
- Subfamily: Obriminae
- Tribe: Obrimini
- Genus: Tisamenus
- Species: T. summaleonilae

Binomial name
- Tisamenus summaleonilae Lit & Eusebio, 2005

Species of stick insect

Tisamenus summaleonilae is a species of stick insect in the family Heteropterygidae native to the northeast of Philippine island of Luzon.

== Description ==
Tisamenus summaleonilae is a small, slender, and sparsely spined Tisamenus species, of which only two adult males are known so far. The species describers only reported the length of the holotype specimen at 33.68 millimetres (1.326 in). In contrast to the equally slender, but significantly larger males of Tisamenus polillo, they lack the large, three-part spines (pronatals) on their pronotum. These are very small and rather bumpy. The anterior edge of the pronotum is laterally extended, like a tooth. Unlike males of Tisamenus polillo and the similarly small males of Tisamenus kalahani, their mesothorax and metathorax are not parallel, but widen posteriorly, giving the entire thorax a wedge-shaped appearance. The triangle on the mesonotum, typical of the genus, is large in males of Tisamenus summaleonilae, reaching almost two-thirds of the mesonotum length. The two posterior edges of this triangle are clearly raised. There are no spines on the mesopleura and only very small spines on the metapleura above the coxae (supracoxal spines). There are no spines on the abdomen.

== Distribution, discovery and taxonomy ==
The only known specimens of the species are two males from the Isabela Province in northeastern Luzon, more precisely from Sitio Apaya, in Barangay Dibuluan, part of the municipality of San Mariano. They were collected there in June 2005 by A.C. Diesmos at an altitude of about 200 metres (660 ft). Ireno L. Lit Jr. and Orlando L. Eusebio described Tisamenus summaleonilae in the same year based on these specimens, together with Tisamenus kalahani. Both specimens are deposited in the Entomological collection of the Museum of National History of the University of the Philippines Los Baños (UPLB), one as the holotype, the other as the paratype. Lit and Eusebio assigned both Tisamenus summaleonilae and Tisamenus kalahani to the previously monotypic Polillo group established by James Abram Garfield Rehn and his son John William Holman Rehn. The species name "summaleonilae" is a combination of the Latin adjective "summus", meaning high, and the first or given name of Dr. Leonila A. Corpuz-Raros, who, like the described animals, comes from Isabela Province and is a highly valued mentor to the authors. The combination "summaleonilae" is intended to emphasize that Dr. Raros deserves the highest honor for her achievements as a scientist, systematist, and acarologist.
