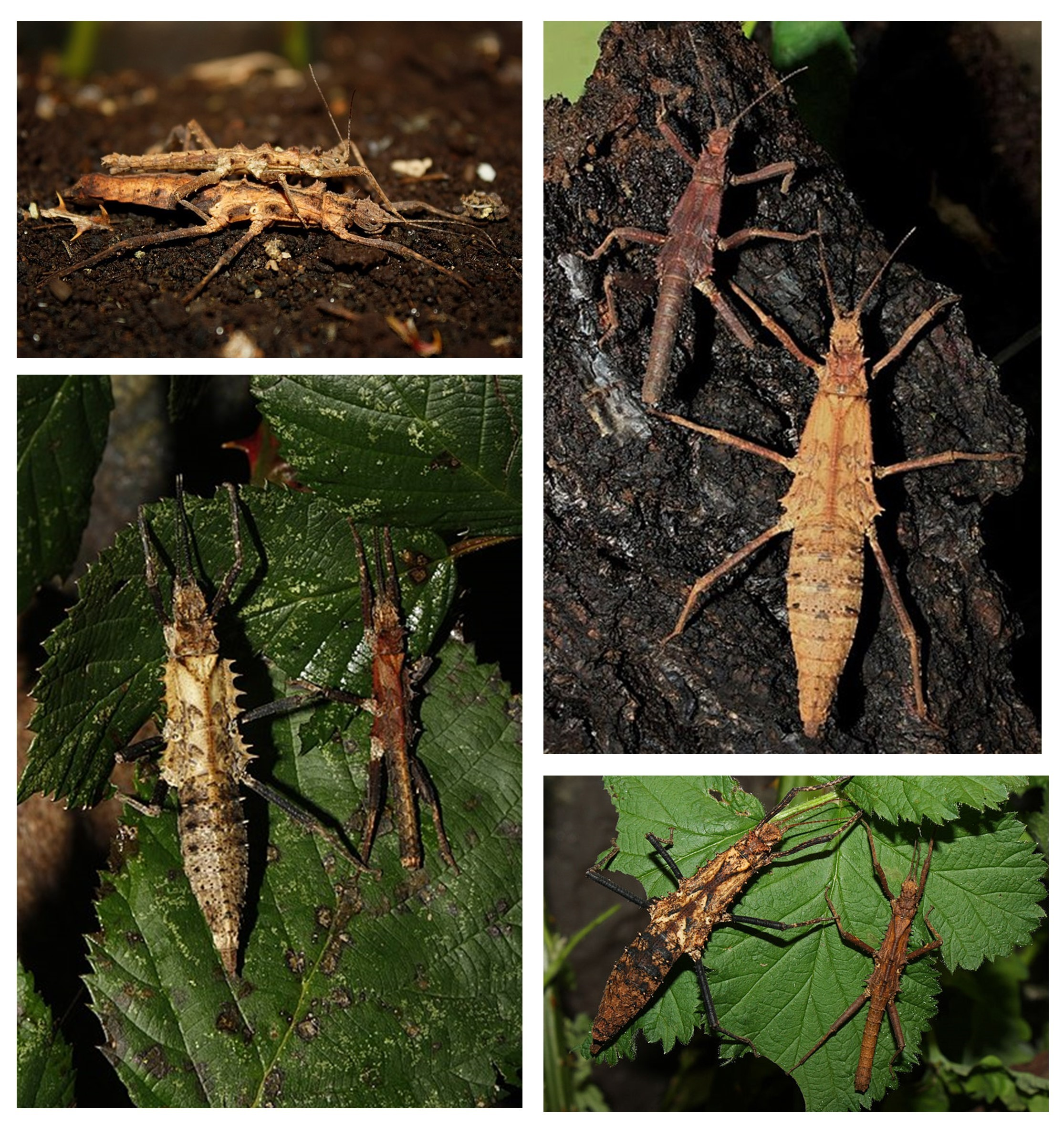
- Different Tisamenus species

Scientific classification
- Kingdom: Animalia
- Phylum: Arthropoda
- Clade: Pancrustacea
- Class: Insecta
- Order: Phasmatodea
- Superfamily: Bacilloidea
- Family: Heteropterygidae
- Subfamily: Obriminae
- Tribe: Obrimini
- Genus: Tisamenus; Stål, 1875

Type species
- Tisamenus serratorius Stål, 1875

Species
- List: Tisamenus alviolanus; Tisamenus armadillo; Tisamenus asper; Tisamenus cervicornis; Tisamenus charestae; Tisamenus clotho; Tisamenus deplanatus; Tisamenus draconinus; Tisamenus hebardi; Tisamenus heitzmanni; Tisamenus hystrix; Tisamenus irenoliti; Tisamenus kalahani; Tisamenus lachesis; Tisamenus makinis; Tisamenus malawak; Tisamenus napalaki; Tisamenus polillo; Tisamenus ranarius; Tisamenus serratorius; Tisamenus spadix; Tisamenus summaleonilae; Tisamenus tagalog; Tisamenus trapezoides

Synonyms
- Ilocano Rehn, J.A.G. & Rehn, J.W.H., 1939

= Tisamenus (insect) =

Genus of stick insects

The genus Tisamenus, endemic to the Philippines, currently includes 24 valid (as of July 2025), small to medium-sized species of stick insects. A relatively rarely used common name for the genus is triangular back stick insect, which in turn refers to the genus-typical triangle on the mesonotum.

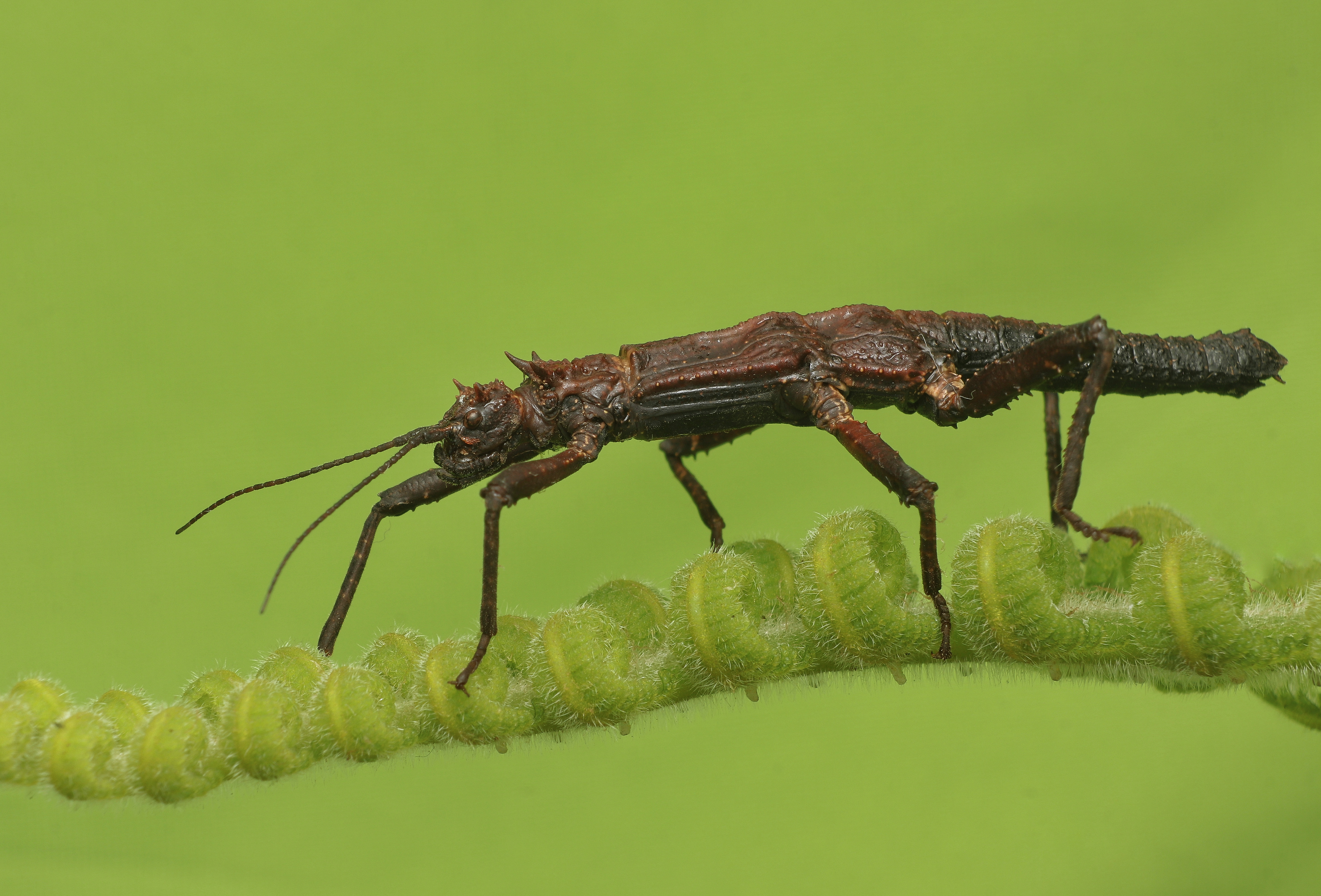
Male of Tisamenus alviolanus

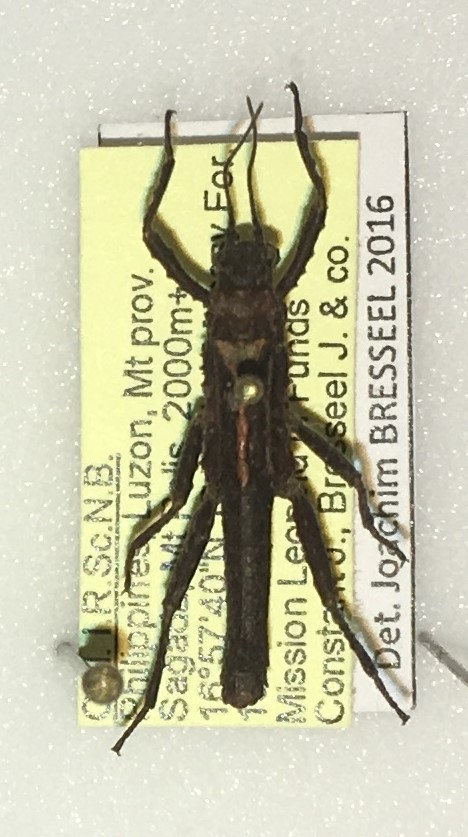
Preparation of a male of Tisamenus hebardi (Syn. Ilocano hebardi)

- Tisamenus
  - - Tisamenus heitzmanni 'Cebu'
    - - Tisamenus clotho 'Camarines'
      - Tisamenus cervicornis 'Pocdol'
      - - Tisamenus malawak 'Camiguin'
        - Tisamenus hystrix 'Sibuyan'
  - - Tisamenus deplanatus 'Ilocos'
    - - - Tisamenus napalaki 'Palaui'
        - Tisamenus sp. 'San Pablo'
      - - Tisamenus hebardi
        - - - Tisamenus lachesis 'Mt. Binangonan' (Real, Sierra Madre)
            - Tisamenus lachesis 'Quezon'
              = Tisamenus sp. 'Nueva Vizcaya'
          - - Tisamenus sp. 'Macatel Falls' (Claveria)
            - Tisamenus draconinus 'Cagayan'
              = Tisamenus sp. 'Callao Cave'

Relationships of the examined Tisamenus species by Sarah Bank et al. (2021). Species classification according to Hennemann (2025)

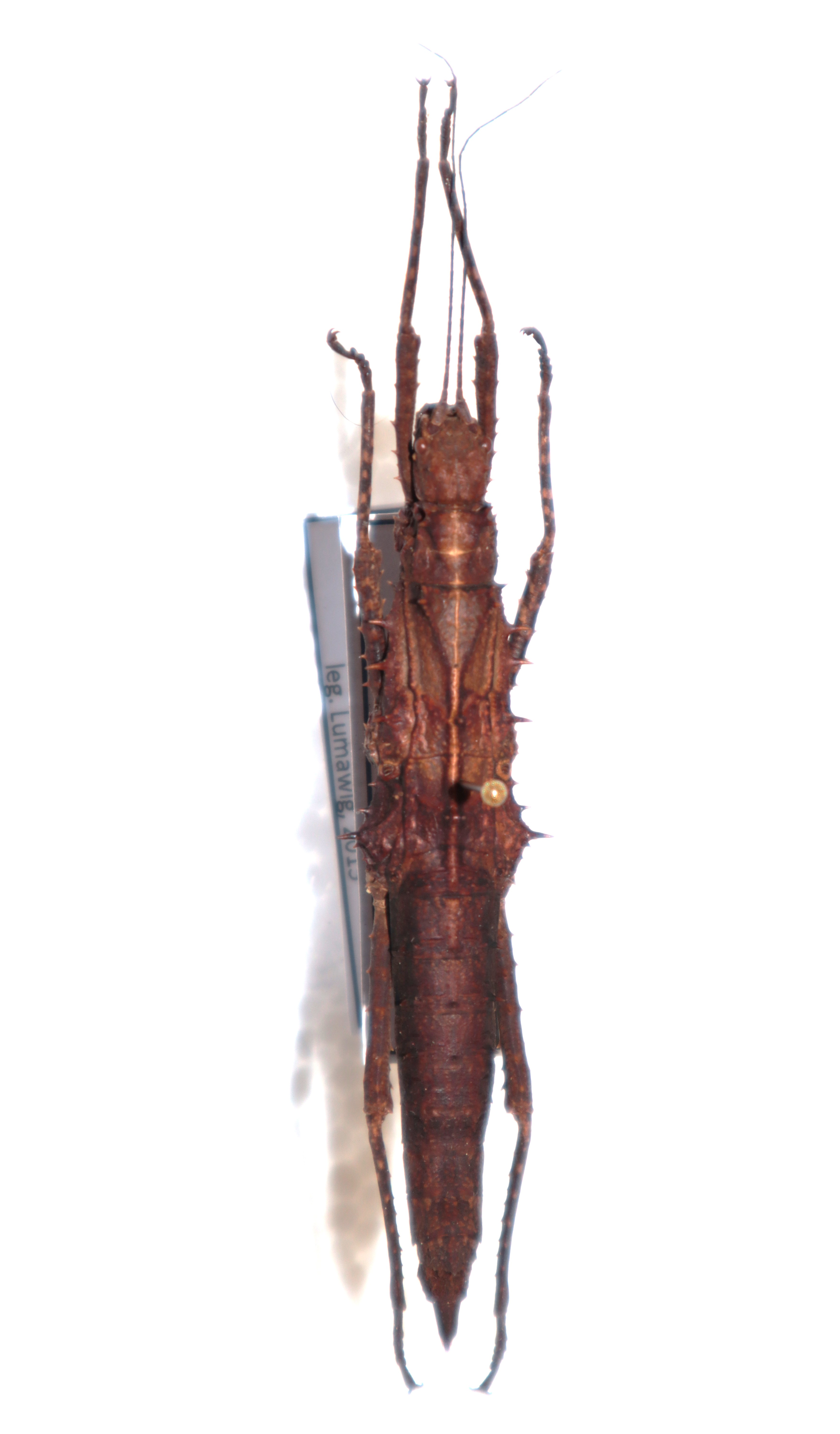
Female of Tisamenus sp. 'San Pablo' from the collection of Thies H. Büscher

== Taxonomy ==
In 1875 Carl Stål established the genus Tisamenus in addition to the genus Hoploclonia. In this he described Tisamenus serratorius, which was designated the type species by William Forsell Kirby in 1904. Stål also transferred two species described by John Obadiah Westwood in 1848 to this genus, namely Phasma (Pachymorpha) deplanatum (current name Tisamenus deplanatus) and Phasma (Pachymorpha) draconinum (current name Tisamenus draconinus). The name "Tisamenus" (Ancient Greek: Τισαμενός) is the name of several people in classical antiquity and greek mythology. James Abram Garfield Rehn and his son John William Holman Rehn mention in 1939 the special position of the two Hoploclonia species Hoploclonia gecko and Hoploclonia cuspidata, which are already known from Borneo, but synonymized Tisamenus with Hoploclonia. They transferred all previously known Tisamenus species to the genus Hoploclonia, in which they described a further eight species. They created an identification key for the Philippine species and divided them into the following four subgroups according to morphological aspects (here supplemented by three species later described by Ireno L. Lit jr. and Orlando L. Eusebio in Tisamenus and assigned to these groups):

1. Draconina group: H. draconina, H. hystrix, H. lachesis
2. Serratoria group: H. serratorius, H. aspera, H. clotho, H. atropos
3. Deplanata group: H. deplanata, H. armadillo, H. cervicornis, H. spadix, H. tagalog, H. fratercula, T. alviolanus
4. Polillo group: H. polillo, T. kalahani, T. summaleonilae

Rehn and Rehn also described the genus Ilocano for Ilocano hebardi (current name Tisamenus hebardi) and transferred the species listed as Heterocopus ranarius (current name Tisamenus ranarius) to this genus. In 2004 the two genera were separated again and the Filipino species were transferred back to the genus Tisamenus. Only those occurring on Borneo were left in the genus Hoploclonia. In 2021, a study based on genetic analysis shows that Ilocano hebardi, the only remaining species of this genus at that time, belongs to Tisamenus, whereby Ilocano became a synonym for it. The division into subgroups made in 1939 could not be confirmed for five investigated species known by name. Nor was a special position of the genus within the Obriminae confirmed, which led Frank H. Hennemann et al. in 2016 to establish the tribe Tisamenini with the genera Tisamenus, Pterobrimus, Hoploclonia and Ilocano, which has since been synonymized with Tisamenus. The tribe Tisamenini was consequently withdrawn, and Tisamenus and Pterobrimus were reassigned to the Obrimini. In addition to the species identified in the meantime, Bank et al. also examined samples from animals from San Pablo, Isabela and Macatel Falls near Claveria, Cagayan, as well as from Cebu and Camiguin from the collection of Thies H. Büscher, and a species from Palaui that had been in captivity since 2016. The results showed that all belong to distinct species that were still undescribed in 2021.

In 2025, Hennemann described seven new species, including the previously molecularly genetically studied Tisamenus heitzmanni from Cebu, Tisamenus malawak from Camiguin, and Tisamenus napalaki from Palaui, while Tisamenus sp. 'San Pablo' and Tisamenus sp. 'Macatel Falls' remained undescribed. He also synonymized two species described by Rehn and Rehn and reassigned a large part of the cultured stocks to other species.

Valid species are:

- Tisamenus alviolanus Lit & Eusebio, 2010
- Tisamenus armadillo Redtenbacher, 1906
- Tisamenus asper Bolívar, 1890
- Tisamenus cervicornis Bolívar, 1890
  (Syn. = Hoploclonia fratercula Rehn, J.A.G. & Rehn, J.W.H., 1939)
- Tisamenus charestae Hennemann & Le Tirant, 2025
- Tisamenus clotho (Rehn, J.A.G. & Rehn, J.W.H., 1939)
  (Syn. = Hoploclonia atropos Rehn, J.A.G. & Rehn, J.W.H., 1939)
- Tisamenus deplanatus (Westwood, 1848)
- Tisamenus draconinus (Westwood, 1848)
- Tisamenus hebardi (Rehn, J.A.G. & Rehn, J.W.H., 1939)
- Tisamenus heitzmanni Hennemann, 2025
- Tisamenus hystrix (Rehn, J.A.G. & Rehn, J.W.H., 1939)
- Tisamenus irenoliti Hennemann, 2025
- Tisamenus kalahani Lit & Eusebio, 2005
- Tisamenus lachesis (Rehn, J.A.G. & Rehn, J.W.H., 1939)
- Tisamenus makinis Hennemann, 2025
- Tisamenus malawak Hennemann, 2025
- Tisamenus napalaki Hennemann, 2025
- Tisamenus polillo (Rehn, J.A.G. & Rehn, J.W.H., 1939)
- Tisamenus ranarius (Westwood, 1859)
- Tisamenus serratorius Stål, 1875
- Tisamenus spadix (Rehn, J.A.G. & Rehn, J.W.H., 1939)
- Tisamenus summaleonilae Lit & Eusebio, 2005
- Tisamenus tagalog (Rehn, J.A.G. & Rehn, J.W.H., 1939)
- Tisamenus trapezoides Hennemann, 2025

== Description ==
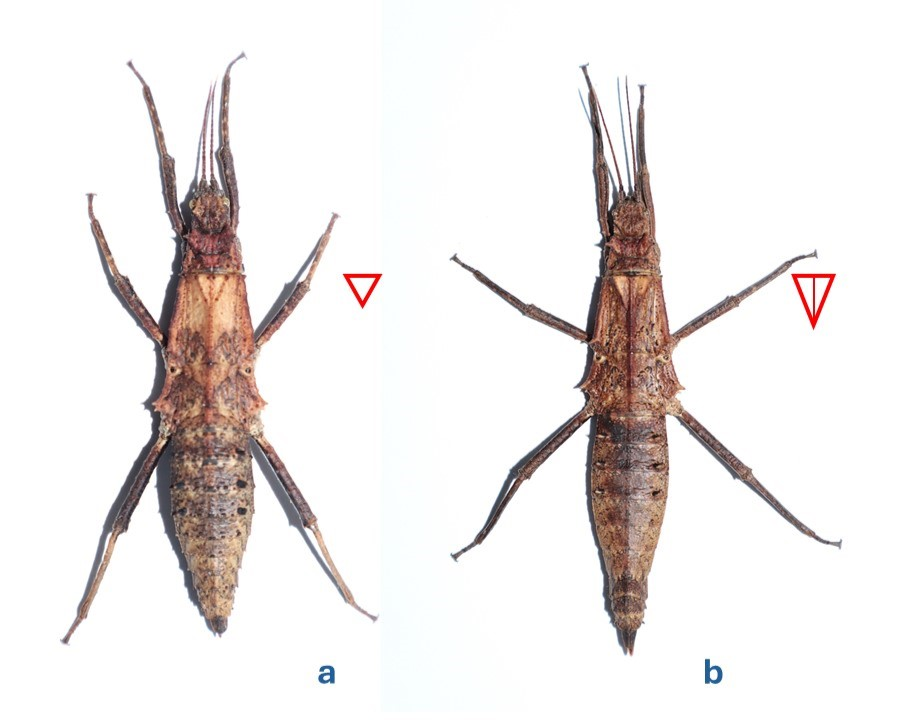
Females of a) Tisamenus cervicornis and b) Tisamenus deplanatus comparing the genus-typical triangle on the mesonotum

The representatives of this genus are consistently small to medium-sized with 1.8 to 5.7 centimetres (0.71 to 2.24 in) in the male and 2.8 to 7.0 centimetres (1.1 to 2.8 in) in the female sex. Both sexes are wingless. The often very similar species differ mainly in their species-specific spines. There are also species that have no or barely recognizable spines. A triangular structure on the mesonotum is characteristic of all representatives. The short side of this isosceles triangle runs parallel to the leading margin of the mesonotum. The other two sides are longer and meet more or less after a third of the mesonotum length, depending on the species. From there a mostly clear keel runs in the middle. In some species this begins at the front margin of the mesonotum and can therefore also be recognized on the triangle. Sometimes it extends to the abdomen or even to the end. Spines are often found on the lateral margins of the thorax, in pairs on the pronotum, and in the middle of the meso- and metanotum. Many representatives also have additional paired and/or centrally arranged spines on the abdomen. The color is mostly dominated by light brown tones. Often, black, light brown to beige patterns can be found, less often even almost white patterns. Males are usually less patterned. When looking at them from above, they often notice their abdomen, which is apparently much too narrow. This is especially true for species whose thorax becomes wider and wider towards the metanotum. The proportions of the females appear more symmetrical, as the abdomen is always wider than that of the males. As is typical for the representatives of the Obriminae, they have a secondary ovipositor at the end of the abdomen for laying the eggs in the ground, which is rather short in Tisamenus females. It surrounds the actual ovipositor and is ventral formed from the eighth sternite, here called subgenital plate or operculum and dorsally from the eleventh tergum, which is referred to here as the supraanal plate or epiproct.

== Distribution ==
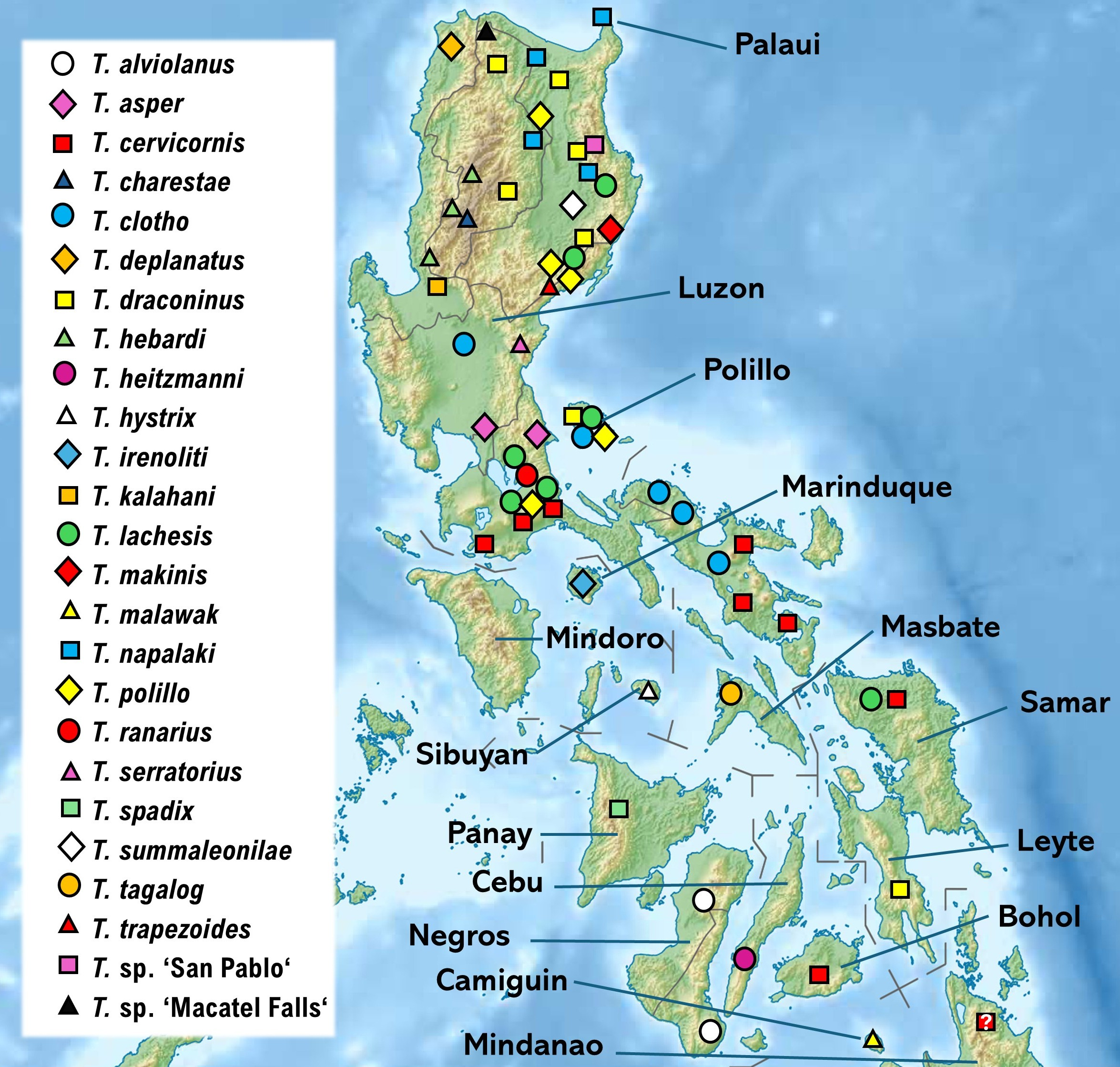
Distribution of the Tisamenus species

Biogeographically, the genus is predominantly restricted to the Greater Luzon region, which includes the Polillo Islands and Masbate Island. The four species described from the Polillo Islands were sometimes considered endemic to this island group. However, all four species have also been recorded on Luzon. One species of the genus occurs on Sibuyan Island, thus forming a separate biogeographic region.

Furthermore, Tisamenus is represented by several species on the Visayas Islands. It occurs with one endemic species each on the islands of Negros and Panay, which are grouped together as a biogeographical region. One species has been recorded on Bohol, and two species on Samar, both of which are also found on Luzon. One endemic species each occurs on the islands of Cebu, Leyte, and Camiguin. Although the latter two islands belong to the Greater Mindanao region, the distribution of the genus or any species within the genus on Mindanao itself is doubtful or cannot be reliably proven.

== Way of life and reproduction ==
The nocturnal animals hide near the ground during the day. Even at night they hardly climb higher than 20 centimetres (7.9 in) on the food plants. The eggs are laid in the ground by the females with the ovipositor. They are 4 to 5 millimetres (0.16 to 0.20 in) long and 2.5 to 3.0 millimetres (0.098 to 0.118 in) wide and usually covered with more or less clear lines of hairs. The micropylar plate has three arms and resembles an upside-down "Y". The arm pointing to the lid (operculum) is significantly longer than the arms pointing to the lower pole. The nymphs hatch after 4 to 6 months and need 5 to 7 months to become adult.

== In terraristics ==
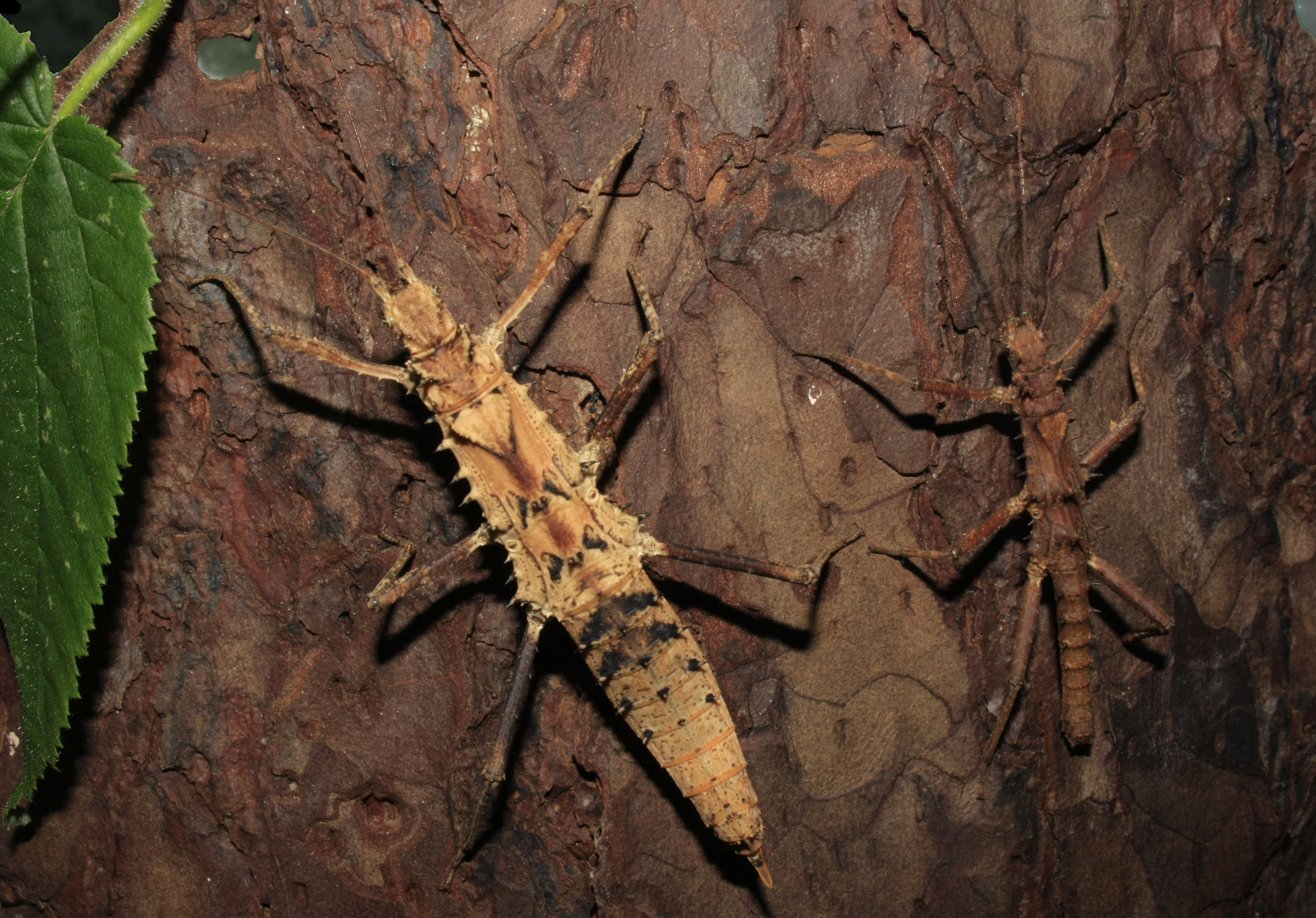
Pair of Tisamenus lachesis 'Cunayan' (PSG-Nr. 359)

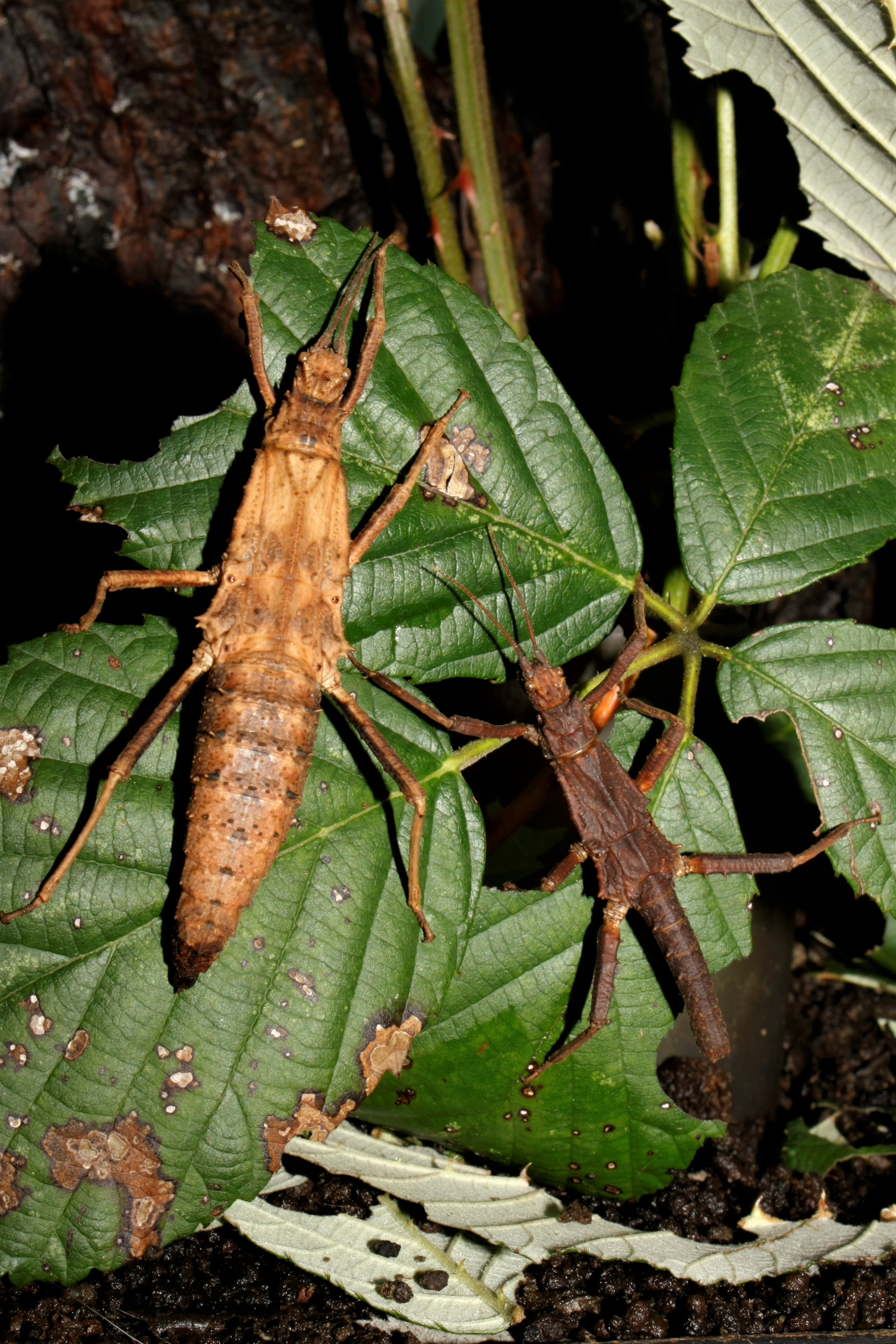
Pair of Tisamenus cervicornis 'Pocdol' (PSG-Nr. 399)

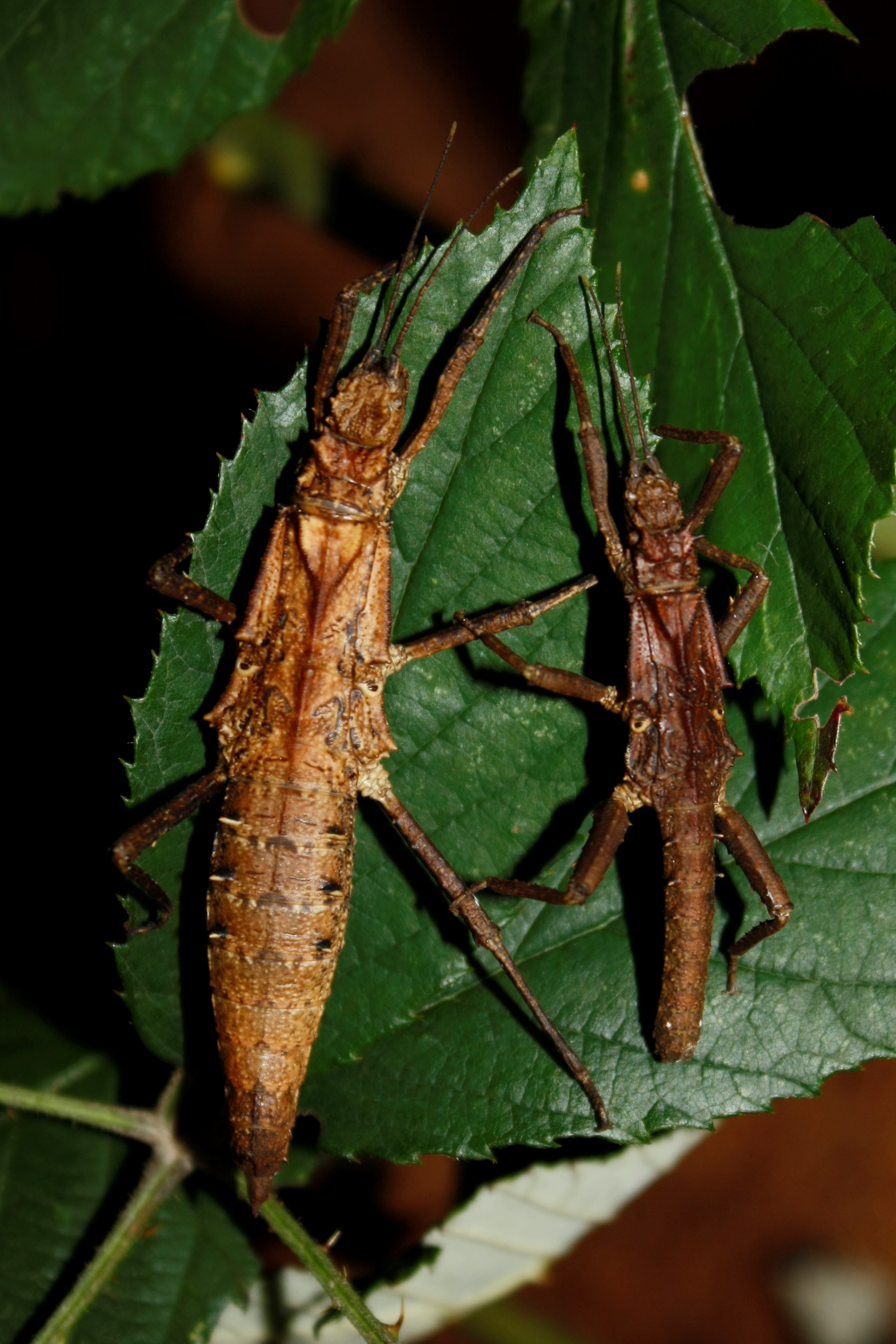
Pair of Tisamenus deplanatus 'Ilocos' (PSG-Nr. 391)

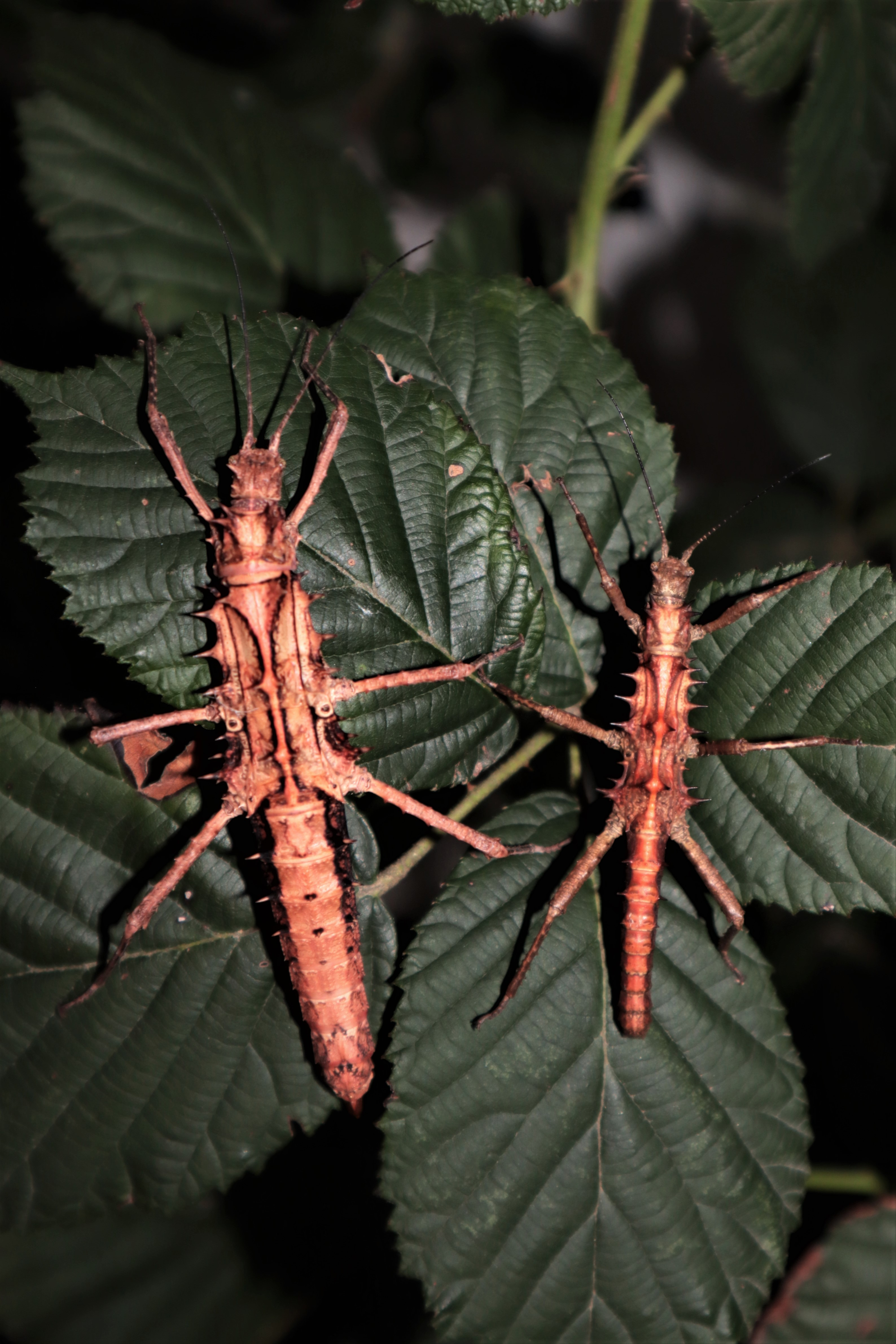
Pair of Tisamenus napalaki 'Palaui'

Many of the breeding stocks found in the terrariums of enthusiasts initially came into circulation under different names. The first animals of the genus to be bred in Europe were collected in 2009 by Joachim Bresseel and Thierry Heitzmann in the province of Quezon on the island of Luzon. Locations are the Sierra Madre mountains near Real and Real itself. Bresseel, Rob Krijns and Tim Bollens found more animals in 2010. The animals initially came to Europe as Tisamenus sp. 'Sierra Madre' or Tisamenus sp. 'Real'. The species was later referred to as Tisamenus serratorius before being identified as Tisamenus lachesis by Frank H. Hennemann in 2025. The Phasmid Study Group lists it as Tisamenus serratorius under the PSG number 314.

At the end of November 2008, Heitzmann collected a female in the Quezon National Park, from which another breeding stock can be traced back. Specimens of this stock were initially referred to as Tisamenus sp. 'Quezon National Park' after their location, but according to Hennemann they also belong to Tisamenus lachesis. Bressell, Bollens and Mark Bushell also found other animals on Luzon in the province Aurora near the city of San Luis in Cunayan. Although these have more or more pronounced spines, particularly along the middle of the body, they are also classified as the very variable Tisamenus lachesis. They were also initially referred to as Tisamenus sp. 'Cunayan' after their location. The Phasmid Study Group lists them under this name as PSG number 359.

In October and November 2010, Heitzmann found animals in the southern Luzon in the Pocdol Mountains on Mount Pulog (not to be confused with Mount Pulag in the north of Luzon) and on Mount Osiao that were initially identified as Tisamenus deplanatus. The resulting breeding strain was long referred to as Tisamenus deplanatus 'Pocdol' and was given the PSG number 399 by the Phasmid Study Group. It was not until 2022 that Hennemann clarified that the animals in this breeding strain were Tisamenus cervicornis.

In 2014, Heitzmann collected further, similar animals in the Ilocos region. They were named Tisamenus sp. 'Ilocos' after their place of discovery and were recorded under this name as PSG number 391. Following an initial identification, they were assigned to Tisamenus fratercula. Hennemann identified them in 2024 as the real Tisamenus deplanatus.

At the beginning of June 2014, Albert Kang brought animals from the island of Sibuyan that were initially named and distributed as Tisamenus sp. 'Sibuyan'. Hennemann identified these as Tisamenus hystrix in 2023. Another breeding stock goes back to two very differently colored females that Heitzmann and Kang collected on November 5, 2014, in a protected area near the Callao Cave in the province of Cagayan. A sexual breeding stock was established from the eggs laid by these females, which was initially distributed as Tisamenus sp. 'Cagayan'. It is one of the most widespreaded species of the genus. The species was identified as Tisamenus draconinus by Hennemann in 2025, so the stock must be fully referred to as Tisamenus draconinus 'Cagayan'.

A species called Tisamenus sp. 'Palaui' was collected by Kang in June 2016 on the island of Palaui, which also belongs to the province of Cagayan. Heitzmann was able to breed the species successfully and sent eggs from the offspring to Europe. The species is similarly spiny to Tisamenus draconinus, but has a much more contrasting and intense coloration. The adult females are characterized by a longitudinal orange stripe and the males have an almost orange-red body coloration. The species was described by Hennemann in 2025 as Tisamenus napalaki.

Heitzmann found specimens on July 22nd at Mount Bagacay and on August 4th, 2015 at Mananap Waterfall in the province of Camarines Norte that were initially bred as Tisamenus cf. clotho 'Camarines'. Bressell confirmed that these animals belonged to Tisamenus clotho.

Tisamenus sp. 'Ifugao', which was collected by Heitzmann and Kang in October 2013 and described by Hennemann in 2025 as Tisamenus charestae, is no longer in culture. Tisamenus hebardi, collected by Heitzmann, Bresseel, and Jérôme Constant in April 2014 in the cloud forest on Mount Polis and was initially called Ilocano hebardi 'Sagada', is also no longer in breeding. Both species were kept only briefly and could not be successfully bred.

The keeping and breeding of most of the species mentioned is considered easy. They willingly feed on various forage plants such as bramble, hazel, firethorn, ivy and Hypericum. They only need small, moderately moist terrariums with a substrate for laying eggs.

== Gallery ==
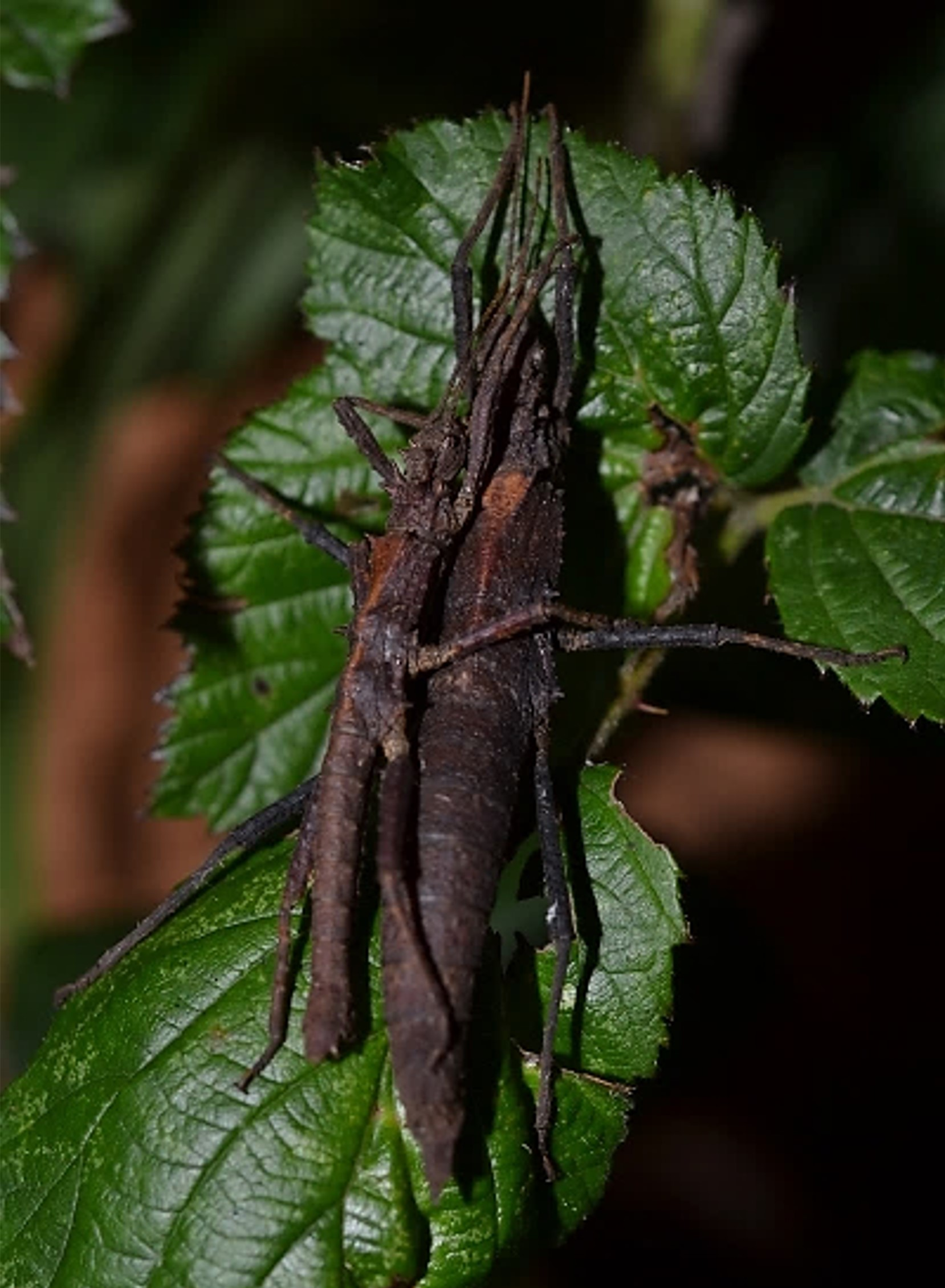
Pair of Tisamenus charestae from Ifugao

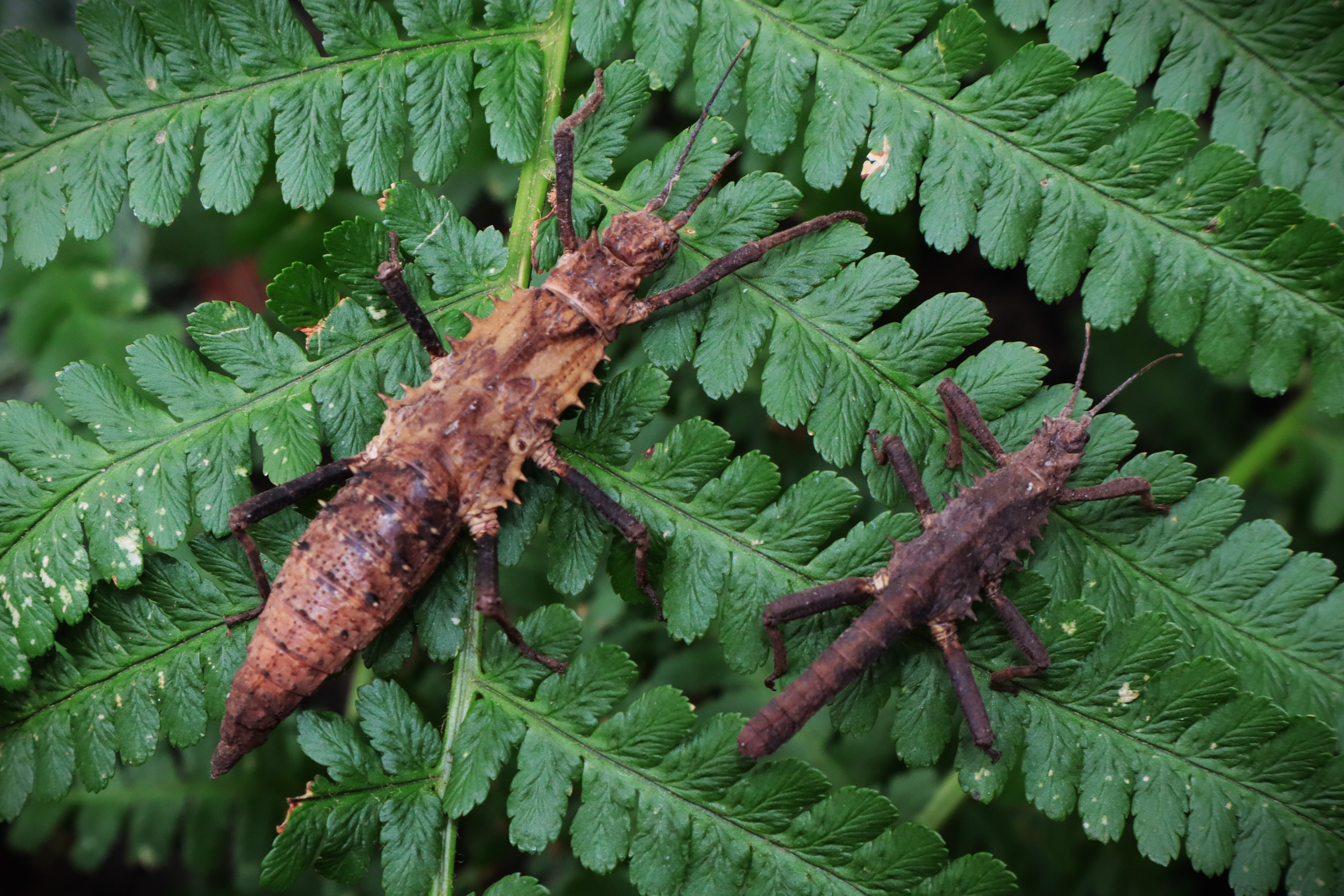
Pair of Tisamenus clotho 'Camarines'

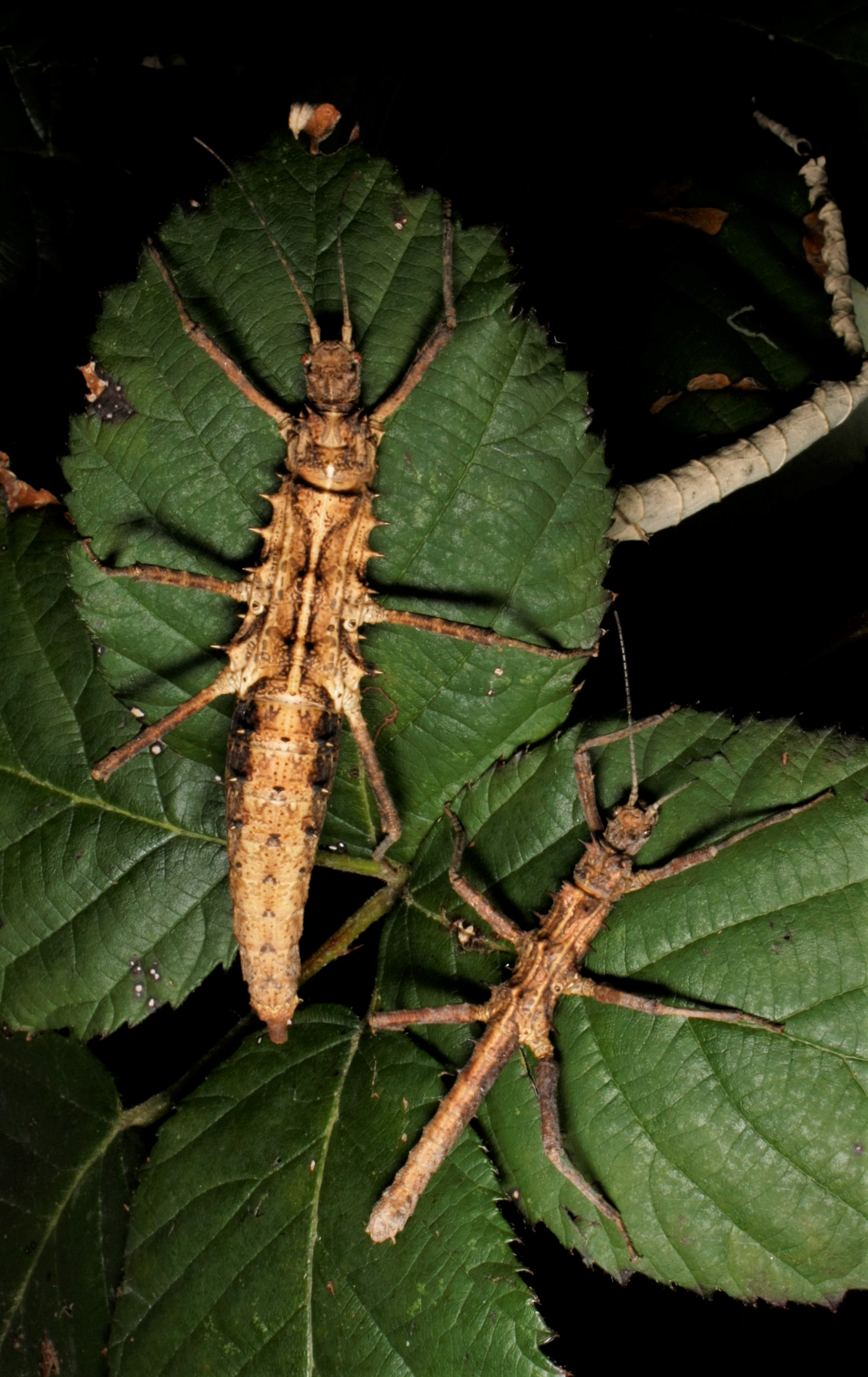
Pair of Tisamenus draconinus 'Cagayan'

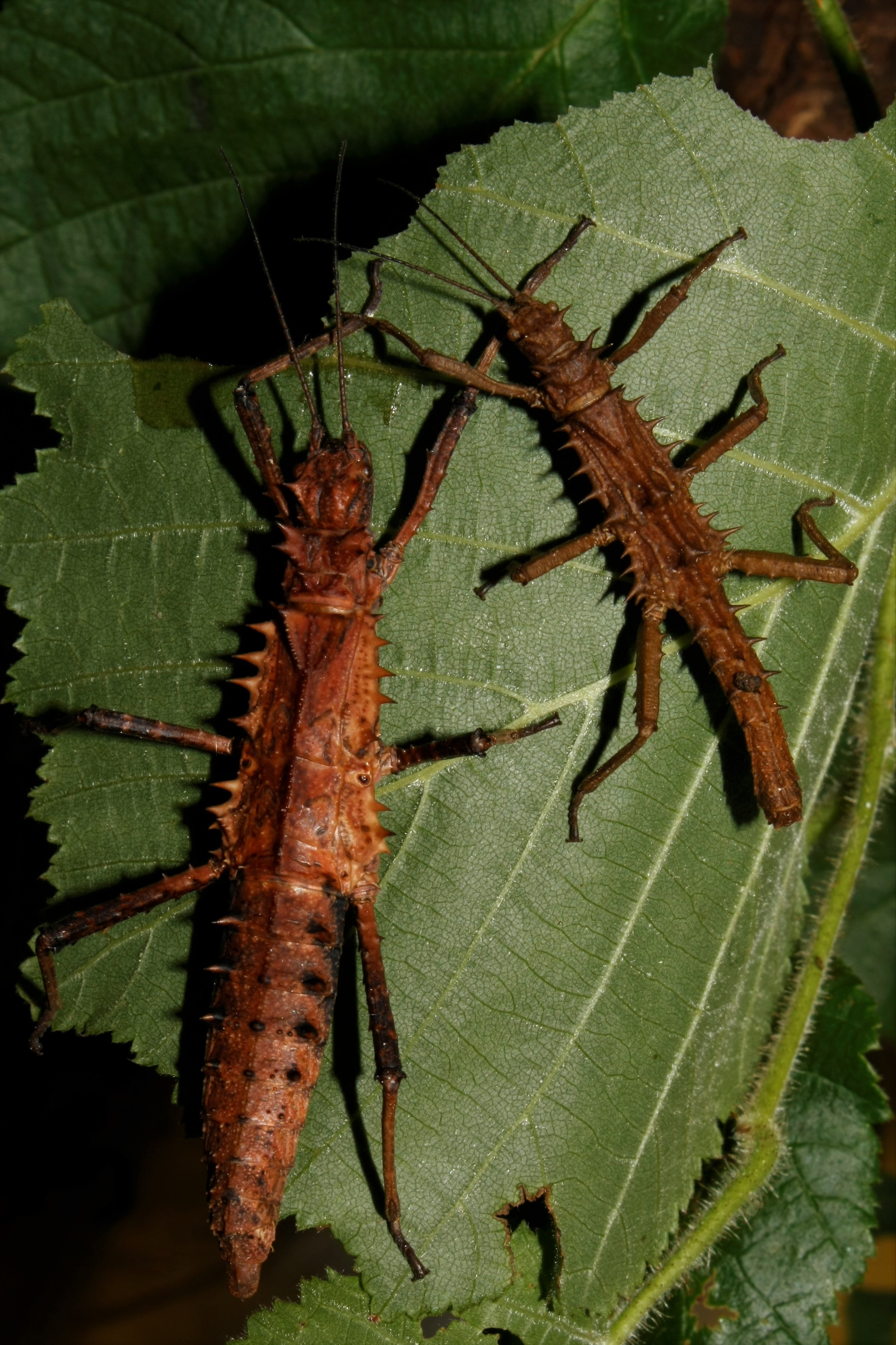
Pair of Tisamenus hystrix 'Sibuyan'

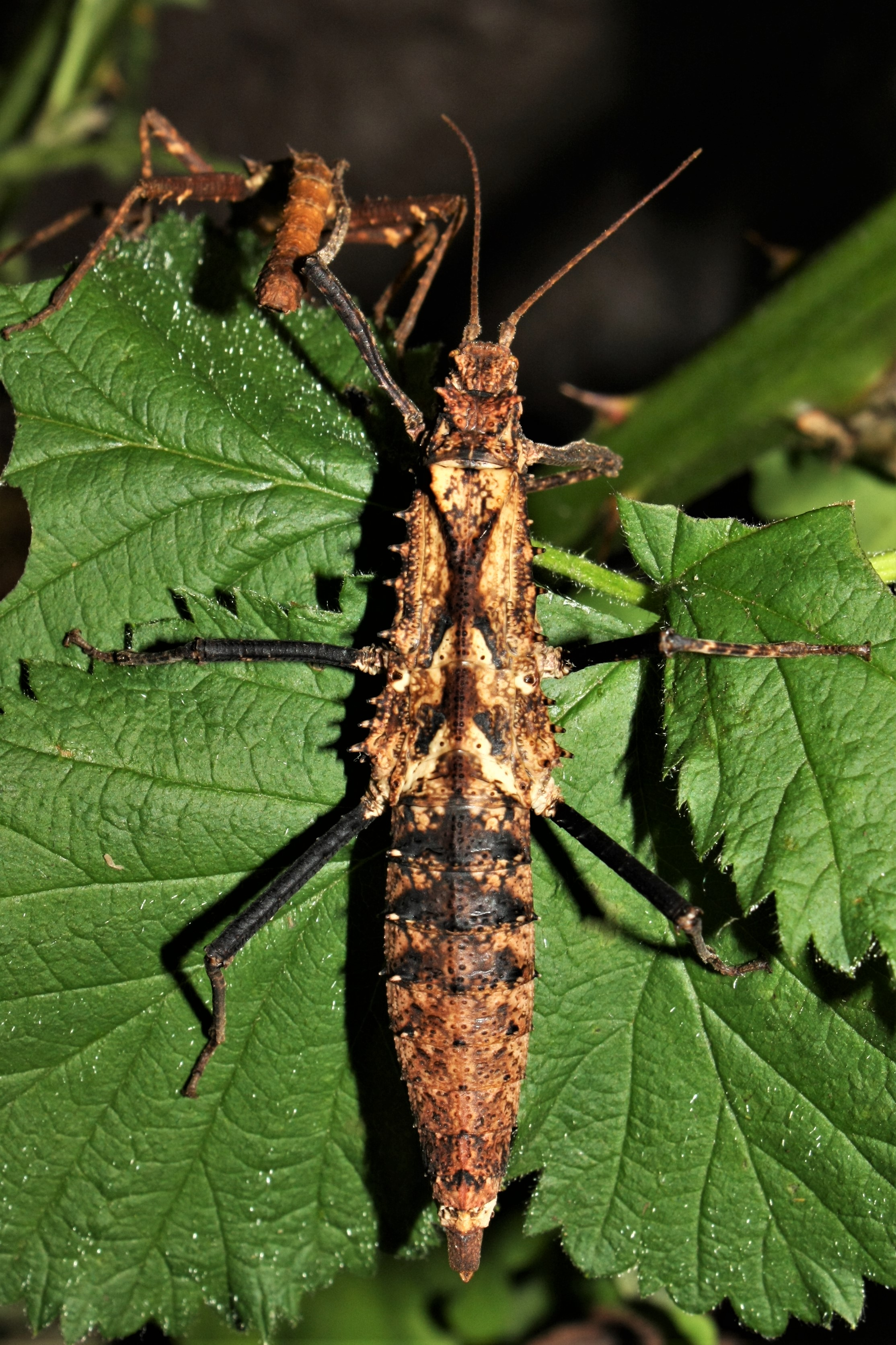
Female of Tisamenus lachesis 'Real-Sierra Madre'

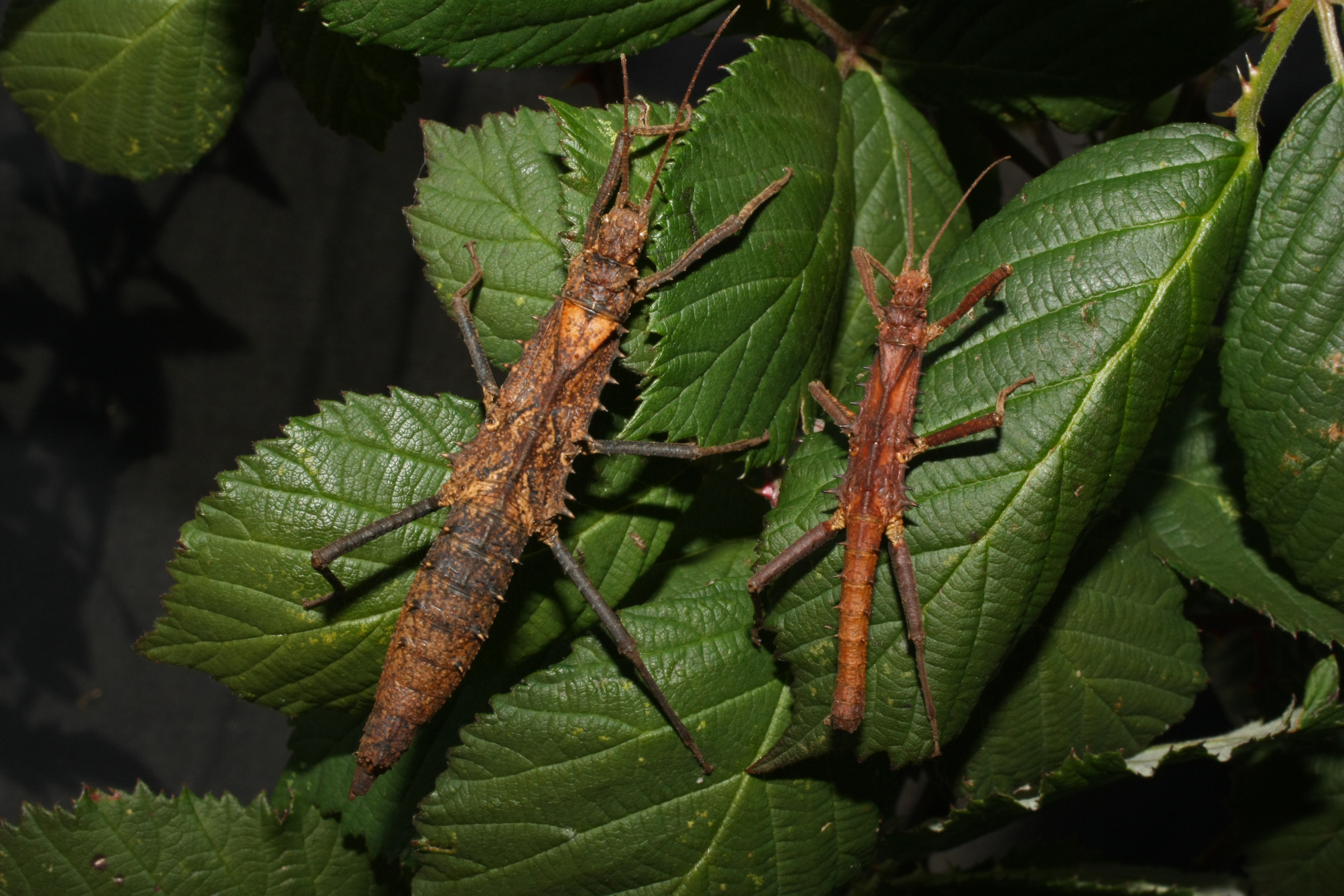
Pair of Tisamenus lachesis 'Quezon National Park'
