= Tisamenus kalahani =

Scientific classification
- Kingdom: Animalia
- Phylum: Arthropoda
- Clade: Pancrustacea
- Class: Insecta
- Order: Phasmatodea
- Family: Heteropterygidae
- Subfamily: Obriminae
- Tribe: Obrimini
- Genus: Tisamenus
- Species: T. kalahani

Binomial name
- Tisamenus kalahani Lit & Eusebio, 2005

Species of stick insect

Tisamenus kalahani is a species of stick insect in the family Heteropterygidae native to the north of Philippine island of Luzon.

== Description ==
Tisamenus kalahani is a small, very slender, and sparsely spined Tisamenus species, of which only one male is known so far. This male is 31.5 millimetres (1.24 in) long and has only weakly developed head and body structures. Unlike the equally slender, but significantly larger males of Tisamenus polillo, they lack the large, spiny supraorbital spines on their heads. The anterior spines on the pronotum (pronotale) of Tisamenus polillo have two or three spines, while those of Tisamenus kalahani have one spine. The pleural spines of the meso- and metathorax, which are pronounced in Tisamenus polillo, are only recognizable as conical tubercles in Tisamenus kalahani. The triangle on the mesonotum, typical for the genus, is flat and not raised as in Tisamenus polillo. The anterior angles of this triangle are spineless in Tisamenus kalahani, whereas they are spiny in Tisamenus polillo. On the terga two and three of the abdomen there are small, paired spines in Tisamenus polillo, which are missing in Tisamenus kalahani. The mesonotum and metanotum of Tisamenus kalahani are parallel, while both segments of the also very small and barely spined Tisamenus summaleonilae are trapezoidal.

== Distribution ==
The holotype was found in the province of Nueva Vizcaya in the north of Luzon, more precisely in the lowlands near the Imugan Falls.

== Taxonomy ==
Ireno L. Lit Jr. and Orlando L. Eusebio described Tisamenus kalahani in 2005 together with Tisamenus summaleonilae. The species name "kalahani" is dedicated to the Kalahan people (also called Kalanguya or Ikalahan), an ethnic group native to Luzon. It was chosen in recognition of their efforts to document and conserve the remaining biodiversity, including arthropods, in their ancestral territory, and for allowing the authors to collect at the species' locality. The male holotype, the only specimen known to date, was collected by E. A. Cosico on May 1, 2005. It is deposited in the Entomological Museum of the Museum of National History of the University of the Philippines Los Baños (UPLB). Lit and Eusebio assigned both Tisamenus kalahani and Tisamenus summaleonilae to the previously monotypic Polillo group established by James Abram Garfield Rehn and his son John William Holman Rehn.
