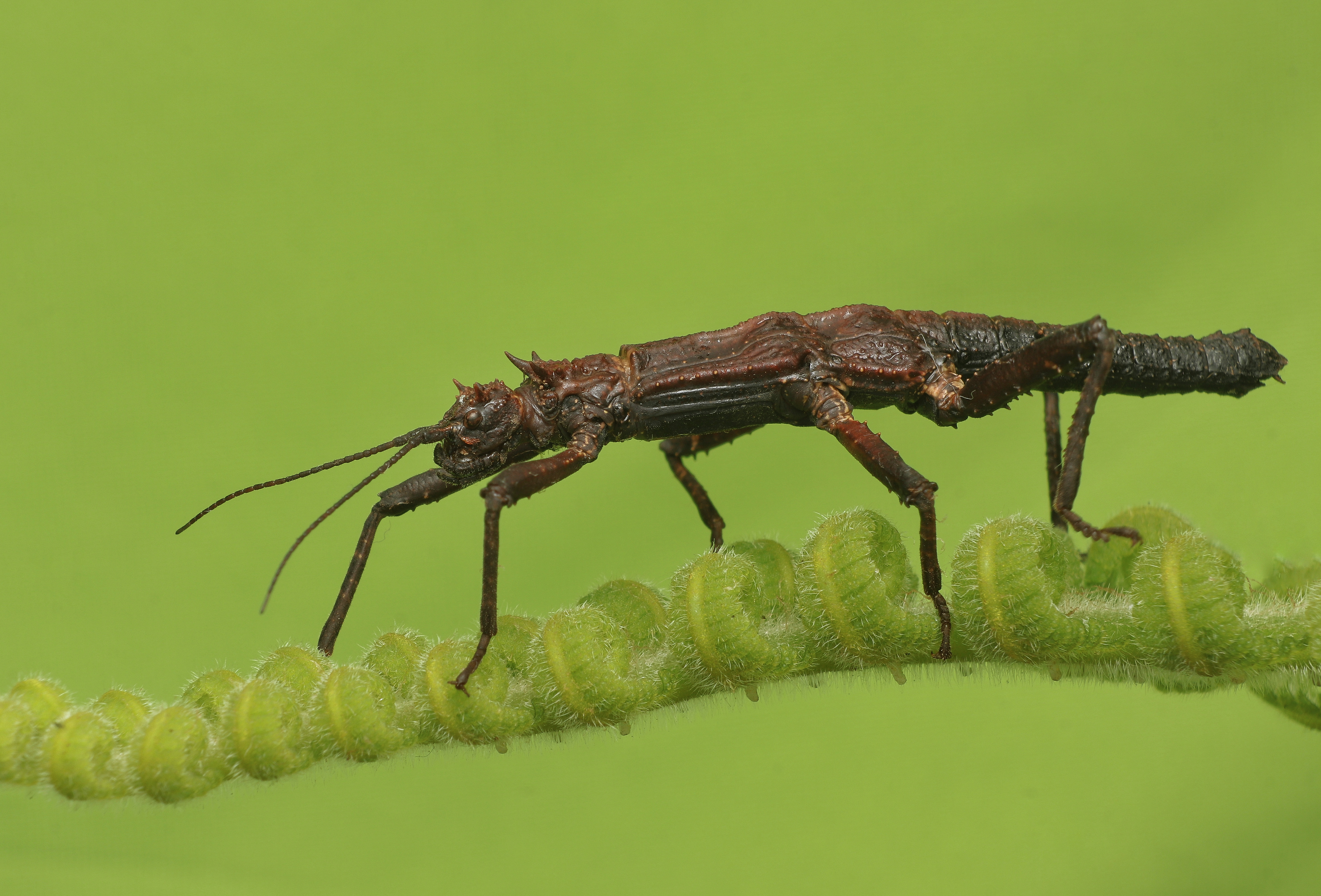
- Tisamenus alviolanus, male

Scientific classification
- Kingdom: Animalia
- Phylum: Arthropoda
- Clade: Pancrustacea
- Class: Insecta
- Order: Phasmatodea
- Family: Heteropterygidae
- Subfamily: Obriminae
- Tribe: Obrimini
- Genus: Tisamenus
- Species: T. alviolanus

Binomial name
- Tisamenus alviolanus Lit & Eusebio, 2010

= Tisamenus alviolanus =

Species of stick insect

Tisamenus alviolanus is a species of stick insect in the family Heteropterygidae native to the Philippine island of Negros.

== Description ==
Tisamenus alviolanus is a small to medium-sized Tisamenus species. They closely resemble the slightly larger Tisamenus cervicornis. Males of Tisamenus alviolanus reach a length of 27.4 to 34.0 millimetres (1.08 to 1.34 in). Their metafemora are only slightly swollen ventrobasally, i.e., on the inside of the base, whereas in the somewhat larger Tisamenus cervicornis they have more clearly rounded swellings there. As in these species, the genus-typical triangle on the mesonotum reaches well into the middle of the mesonotum. It is longer than it is wide and forms an isosceles triangle.

The females reach a length of 44.0 to 46.8 millimetres (1.73 to 1.84 in). As in the larger Tisamenus cervicornis, their triangle on the metanotum is slightly wider than it is long, forming an approximately equilateral triangle. It is wider at the base, i.e., the anterior edge of the mesonotum, and thus larger overall than in Tisamenus cervicornis. Although it does not reach the middle of the mesonotum like in these, it is significantly more than a third of its length. On the terga two to five of the abdomen there are small, paired spines in the middle. The lower part of the ovipositor, known as the subgenital plate, projects beyond the upper part, the epiproct only minimally. In Tisamenus alviolanus the epiproct narrowes to the end and forms a triangle when viewed from above, while in Tisamenus cervicornis it runs almost parallel and is bluntly rounded at the end.

The eggs are 3.7 millimetres (0.15 in) long, 2.24 millimetres (0.088 in) wide, and 2.6 millimetres (0.10 in) high. Compared to Tisamenus cervicornis, the eggs are somewhat more bulbous. The three processes of the micropylar plate form an inverted Y, as is typical for the genus. Their dorsal process is broader, more parallel, and rounder than in Tisamenus cervicornis, where it tapers towards the tip. The other two processes are comparatively short and do not attain the longitudinal middle axis of the capsule. In Tisamenus cervicornis, they projecting over middle axis.

== Distribution ==
Tisamenus alviolanus is the only known Tisamenus species from the island of Negros. The type material comes from the Kanlaon volcano, which is located approximately in the center of Negros Occidental province, which occupies northwestern Negros. Further finds come from Don Salvador Benedicto, also in Negros Occidental province, and from Dumaguete in southern Negros, Negros Oriental province.

== Taxonomy ==
In a work published in 2010, Ireneo L. Lit, Jr. revised the Deplantus group established in 1939 by James Abram Garfield Rehn and his son John William Holman Rehn. He also placed Tisamenus alviolanus in this group, which he described together with Orlando L. Eusebio. The species was described based on a total of four females and three males, all of which are deposited as types in the Entomological Museum of the Museum of National History of the University of the Philippines Los Baños (UPLB). One of the females was declared the holotype, one male the allotype, and the remaining animals the paratypes. All specimens were collected between June 17 and 24, 2007, at the Kanlaon by P. A. Alviola and E. A. Cosico. The species name "alviolanus" is a patronymic adjective in honor of the late curator of the vertebrate collection of the UPLB Museum of National History, Prof. Pedro L. Alviola (April 9, 1948 – May 24, 2007).

For his taxonomic revision of the genus Tisamenus, Frank H. Hennemann examined two females and one male of the species from the collection of the Museum of Natural Sciences in Brussels and another female from his own collection. In his work, published in 2025, he describes the morphological differences between these specimens and Tisamenus cervicornis as so small that a clear distinction between the two species is almost impossible. Only the different distribution areas and minor differences in egg morphology suggest that Tisamenus alviolanus should be retained as a separate species for the time being until more specimens have been examined or DNA samples can be compared.
