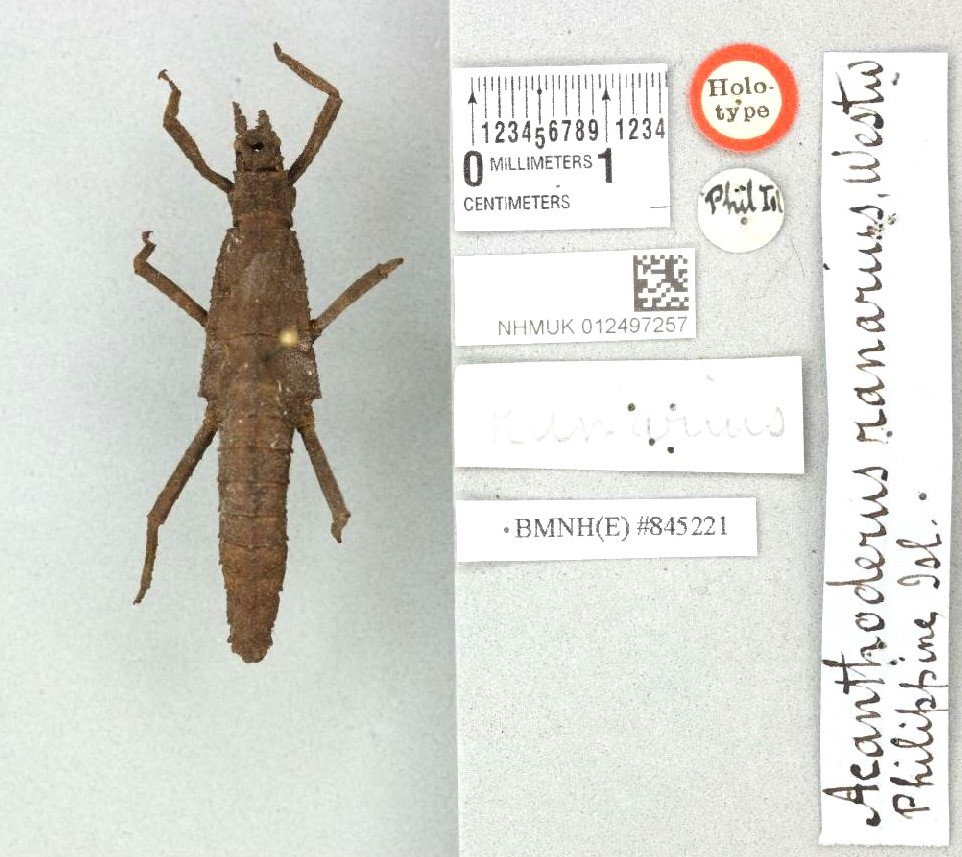
- Tisamenus ranarius, female holotype from Natural History Museum

Scientific classification
- Kingdom: Animalia
- Phylum: Arthropoda
- Clade: Pancrustacea
- Class: Insecta
- Order: Phasmatodea
- Family: Heteropterygidae
- Subfamily: Obriminae
- Tribe: Obrimini
- Genus: Tisamenus
- Species: T. ranarius

Binomial name
- Tisamenus ranarius (Westwood, 1859)

Synonyms
- Acanthoderus ranarius Westwood, 1859; Heterocopus ranarius (Westwood, 1859); Ilocano ranarius (Westwood, 1859)

= Tisamenus ranarius =

Species of stick insect

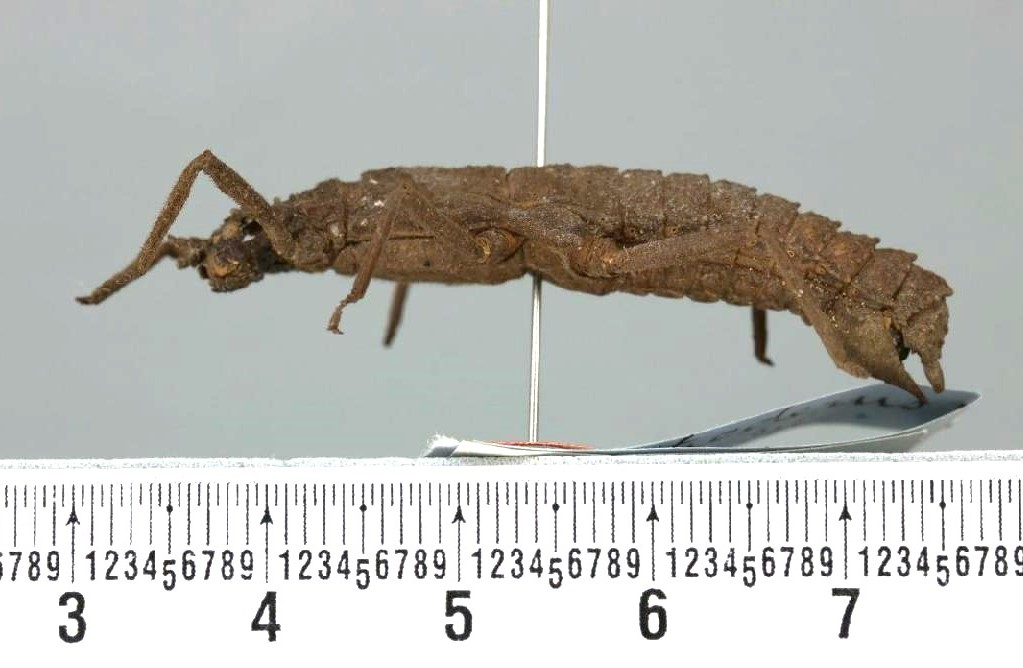
holotype in sideview

Tisamenus ranarius is a stick insect species (Phasmatodea), in the family of the Heteropterygidae native to the Philippines.

== Description ==
Only females are known of this species. These reach a length of 42 to 44 millimetres (1.7 to 1.7 in) and have remarkably few spines for a Tisamenus species. The triangle on the mesonotum typical of the genus is only indicated and hardly recognizable. Rather, it consists of slightly curved crests on the mesonotum. The antennae are very short and consist of 16 to 17 segments. Tuberculous spines are found only on the pronotum and head, where they are formed as suborbitals. The front angles of the pronotum are pointed. The meso- and metathorax form a trapezoid that widens backwards, to which the abdomen attaches approximately the width of the anterior edge of the mesonotum. A distinct longitudinal crest runs from the anterior edge of the mesonotum over the metanotum to the end of the abdomen. On the rear abdominal segments, its parts are clearly tooth-like. The ovipositor is short and beak-shaped.

== Taxonomy ==
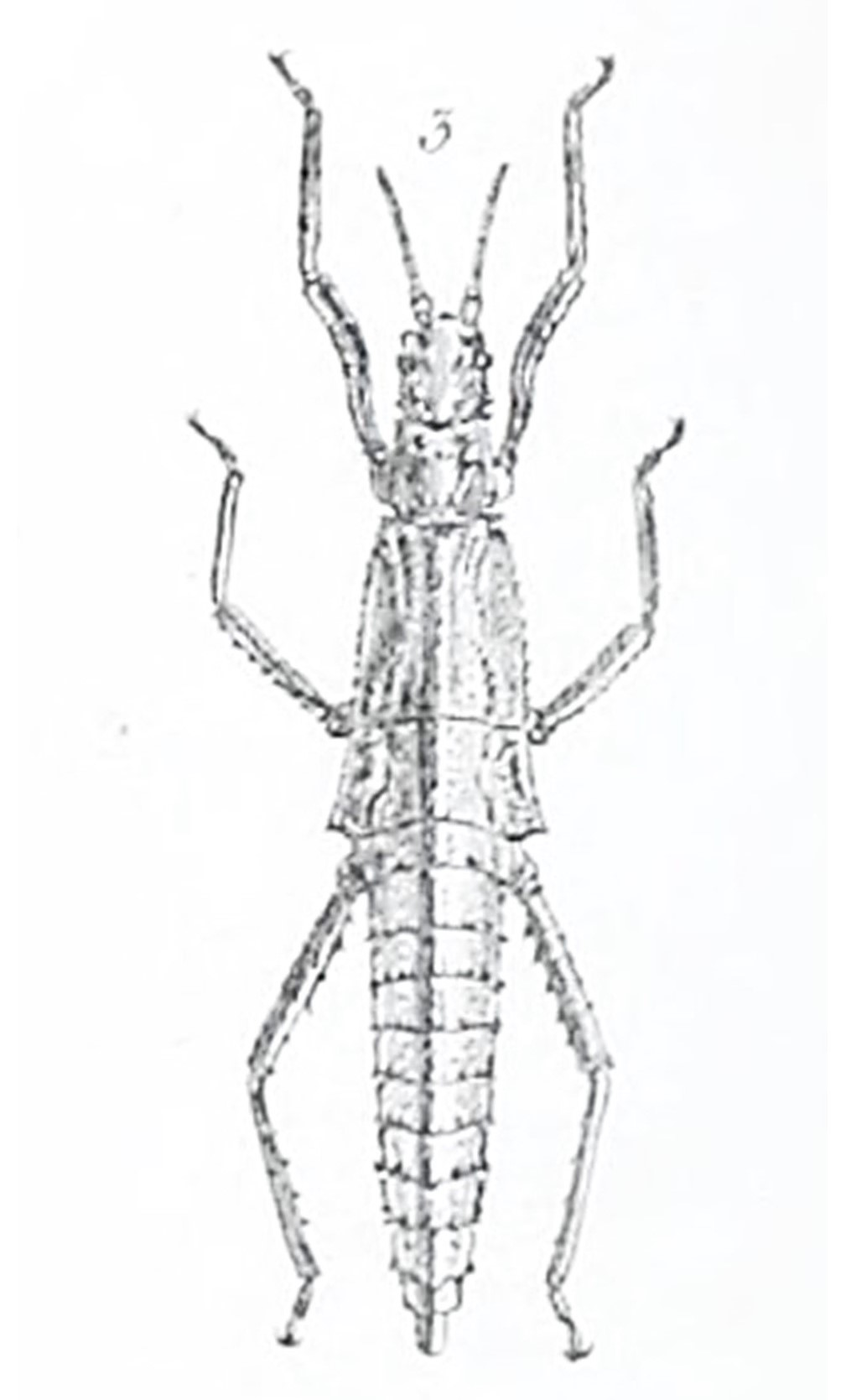
drawing from the species description in 1859 by Westwood

John Obadiah Westwood described the species in 1859 under the basionym Acanthoderus ranarius using a female, which he also depicts. William Forsell Kirby transferred the species in 1904 to the genus Tisamenus, which was established in 1875. In 1906, Joseph Redtenbacher counted the species in addition to the Heterocopus leprosus, which he described, to the genus Heterocopus, which he also listed here. He distinguishes it from Tisamenus by its bluntly keeled, much less spined body. Lawrence Bruner also left it at this assignment in 1915. In 1939, James Abram Garfield Rehn and his son John William Holman Rehn did not transfer the species to the genus Hoploclonia like all current Tisamenus species, but to the genus Ilocano set up for Ilocano hebardi (today Tisamenus herbardi), which has been synonymized with Tisamenus since 2021. The assignment to Ilocano remained until 2004. Only Oliver Zompro transferred the species back to Tisamenus together with all other Philippine representatives except Ilocano hebardi.

The female used by Westwood for the description is deposited as holotype in the Natural History Museum in London. Another female, labeled as another type, is in the Oxford University Museum of Natural History, although Westwood based the description only on material from the Natural History Museum in London. Neither the exact location nor any other information is stored for these specimens.
