= Pleuron (insect anatomy) =

The pleuron (pl. pleura, from Greek side, rib) is a lateral sclerite of thoracic segment of an insect between the tergum and the sternum. While the tergum is positioned on the top (dorsal), and the sternum on the bottom (ventral), the pleuron is positioned to the side (lateral). The terms pro-, meso- and metapleuron are used respectively for the pleura of the first, second and third thoracic segments.

A pleuron usually consists of a epimeron and an episternum. An epimeron is the posterior (back) sclerite of the pleuron, and an episternum is the anterior (front) sclerite.
