= Metathorax =

Segment of an insect body

The metathorax is the posterior of the three segments in the thorax of an insect, and bears the third pair of legs. Its principal sclerites (exoskeletal plates) are the metanotum (dorsal), the metasternum (ventral), and the metapleuron (lateral) on each side. The metathorax is the segment that bears the hindwings in most winged insects, though sometimes these may be reduced or modified, as in the flies (Diptera), in which they are reduced to form halteres, or flightless, as in beetles (Coleoptera), in which they may be completely absent even though forewings are still present. All adult insects possess legs on the metathorax. In most groups of insects, the metanotum is reduced relative to the mesonotum. In the suborder Apocrita of the Hymenoptera, the first abdominal segment is fused to the metathorax, and is then called the propodeum.

== See also ==
- Glossary of entomology terms
- Insect morphology
- Mesothorax
- Prothorax
- Thorax (insect anatomy)
