= Henman (surname) =

Henman is an English surname. It is either an occupational surname for a fowl-keeper, the first component in this case being hen, or a nickname for a noble, courteous man, the first part then from Middle English hende.

== Notable people ==
Notable people with the surname include:

- Héctor Henman (1879–1969), Argentine footballer
- Philip Henman (1899–1986), British businessman
- Tim Henman (born 1974), retired British tennis player

== See also ==
- Hennemann
- Henneman
- Hensman
