= Hensman =

Hensman is a surname. Notable people with the surname include:

- Alfred Hensman (1834–1902), Australian politician
- Dave Hensman (born 20th century), Canadian singer-songwriter
- Donald C. Hensman (1924–2002), American architect
- John Hensman (1780–1864), English clergyman
- Mona Hensman (1899–1991), Indian MP
- Savitri Hensman (born 20th century), activist and writer in UK

== See also ==
- Henman (surname)
