= Sati Savitri =

Sati Savitri may refer to these in Indian arts:

- Savitri and Satyavan, a story in the Mahabharata and its female heroine Savitri
- Sati Savitri (1932 film), a 1932 Hindi film
- Sati Savitri (C. Pullayya film), a 1933 Telugu mythological film
- Sati Savitri (H. M. Reddy film), a 1933 Telugu film
- Sati Savitri (1957 film), a Telugu mythological film
- Sati Savitri (1978 film), a Telugu mythological film
- Sathi Savithri, a 1965 Indian Kannada film

== See also ==
- Savitri (disambiguation)
- Savita (disambiguation)
- Satyavan Savitri (disambiguation)
