= Savithri =

Wikimedia disambiguation page

Savithri may refer to:

- Savithri Sreedharan (1940 or 1941 – 2026) Indian actress
- Doctor Savithri 1955 Indian film

== See also ==
- Savitri (disambiguation)
