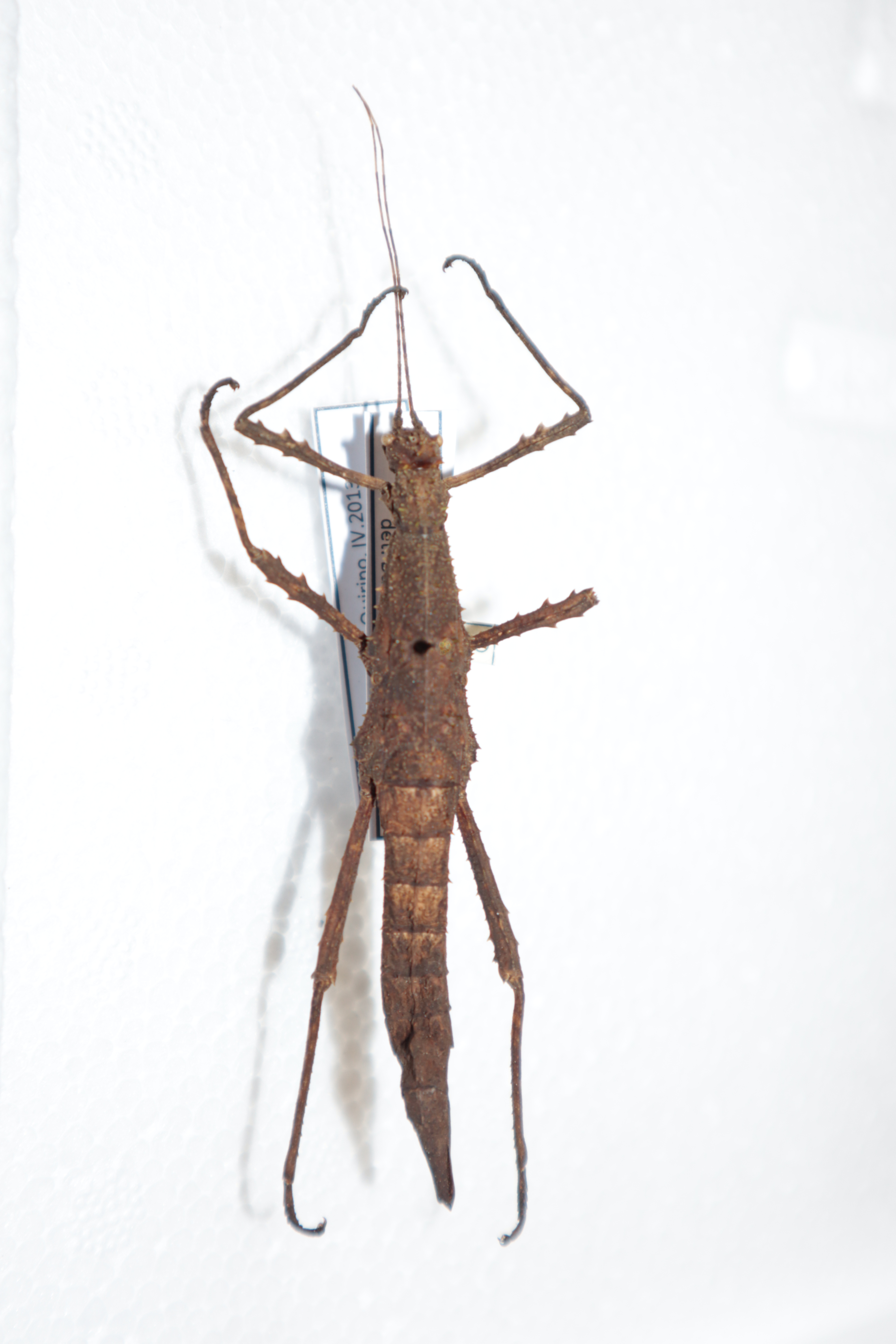
- Sungaya dumagat, prepared female

Scientific classification
- Kingdom: Animalia
- Phylum: Arthropoda
- Clade: Pancrustacea
- Class: Insecta
- Order: Phasmatodea
- Family: Heteropterygidae
- Subfamily: Obriminae
- Tribe: Obrimini
- Genus: Sungaya
- Species: S. dumagat

Binomial name
- Sungaya dumagat Hennemann, 2023

= Sungaya dumagat =

Species of stick insect

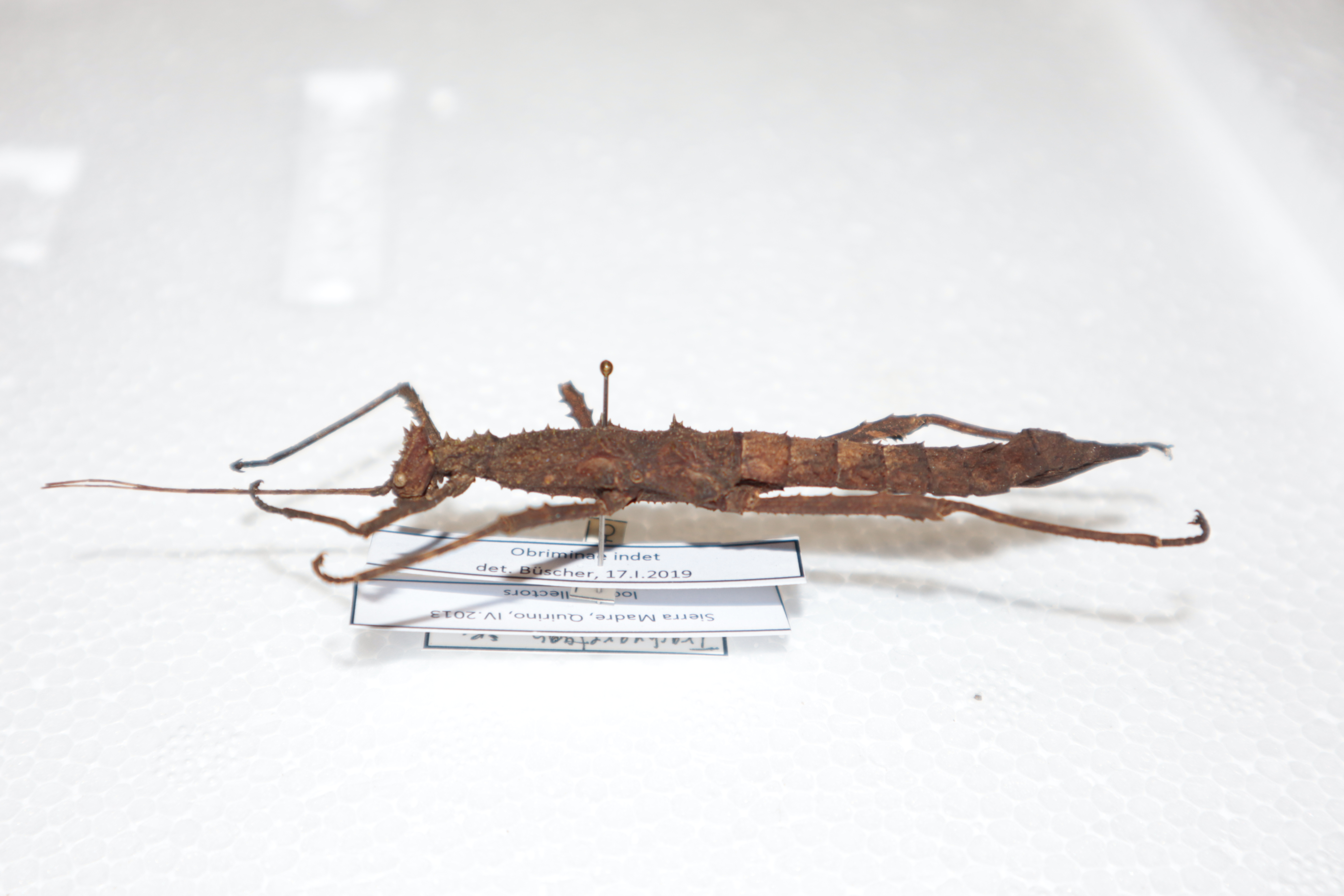
Prepared female from the collection of Thies Büscher

Sungaya dumagat is a stick insect species from the family of Heteropterygidae native to the Philippine island of Luzon. It is the spiniest species of the genus Sungaya and is so far only known from females.

== Description ==
So far, only females of Sungaya dumagat are known. Their habit resembles that of other species of the genus Sungaya and, with a length of around 70 millimetres (2.8 in), are relatively small. The spines on the meso- and metanotum are much more pronounced than in all other species of the genus. The entire body surface is granular to sparsely bumpy. The beak-shaped secondary ovipositor at the end of the abdomen, which is typical for species of the Obriminae, is formed ventrally from the eighth sternum, also called the subgenital plate. The seventh sternite, which is located directly in front of it, is also called the anal segment. In Sungaya dumagat its rear edge is provided with a flat, concave bulge.

== Occurrence ==
The holotype of the species was collected in the north of Luzon in the province of Nueva Vizcaya in Aritao. Another specimen from the collection of Thies H. Büscher was found in April 2013 by local collectors in the eastern neighboring province of Quirino in the Sierra Madre mountains. In 2024, Thierry Heitzmann found further females of this species much further south on Luzon on Mount Sungay in the south of the province of Cavite.

== Taxonomy ==
Frank H. Hennemann described Sungaya dumagat in 2023 as one of three new Sungaya species. It was only described in one female. The chosen specific name "dumagat" is dedicated to the Dumagat, a subgroup of the indigenous people of the Aeta people who live in the municipality of Aritao, the type locality of this species. Translated from Tagalog language the name means "people of the sea", as these people formerly lived in the coastal areas of the provinces of Aurora and Quezon. The specimen, originally from Hennemann's collection, was deposited as holotype in the Museum of Natural Sciences in Brussels. It was collected by Ismael O. Lumawig in July 1996 in Balite in the municipality of Aritao at an altitude of about 1,100 metres (3,600 ft).
