= Satyavan Savitri (disambiguation) =

Satyavan Savitri may refer to multiple movies based on a Savitri and Satyavan story from the Indian epic Mahabharata:

- Satyavan Savitri (1914)
- Satyavan Savithri (1977)
- Sathyavan Savithri (2007)
- Satyawan Savitri (2022), a TV series

== See also ==
- Sati Savitri (disambiguation)
- Savita (disambiguation)
- Savitri (disambiguation)
