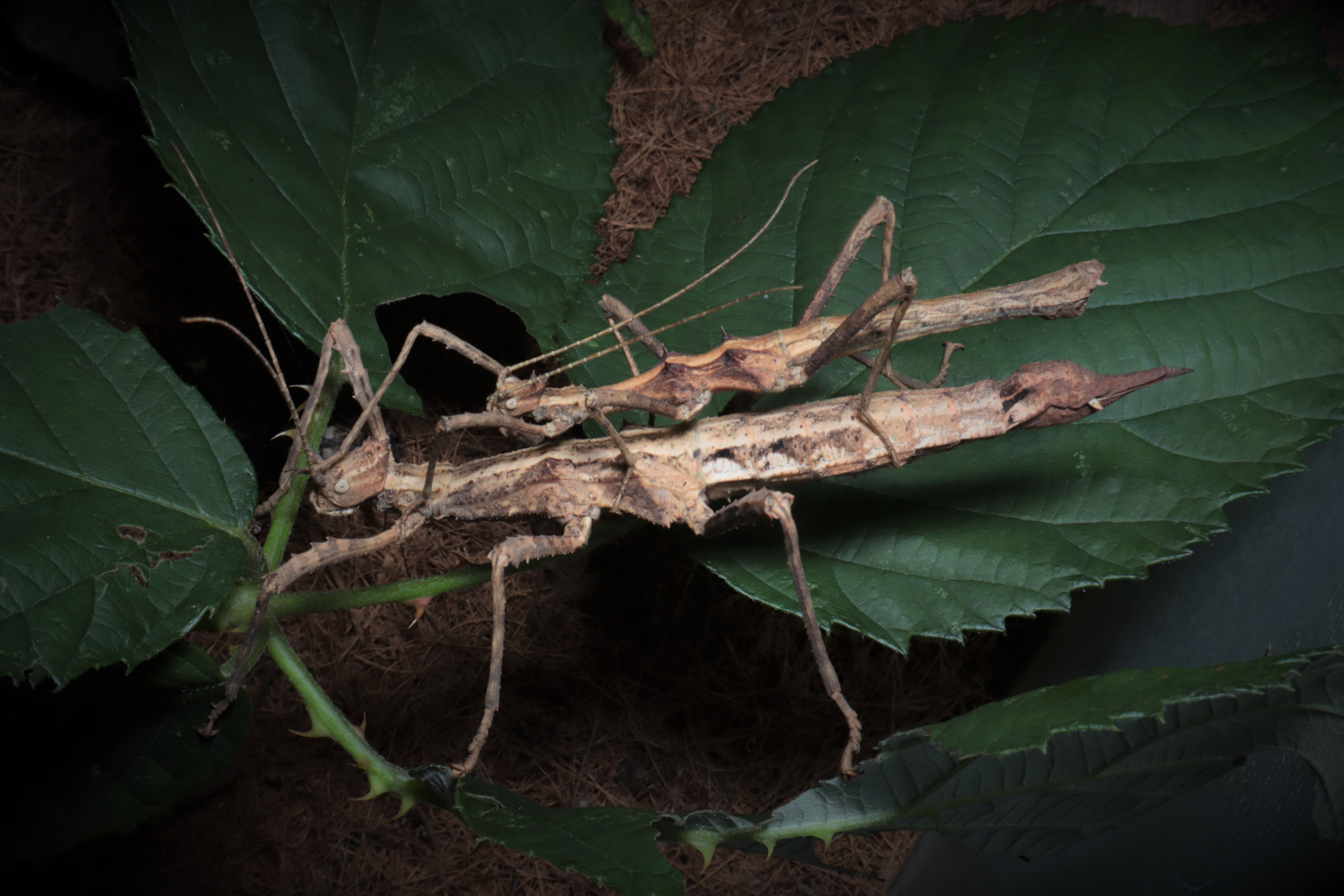
- Sungaya ibaloi ‘Benguet‘, pair

Scientific classification
- Kingdom: Animalia
- Phylum: Arthropoda
- Class: Insecta
- Order: Phasmatodea
- Superfamily: Bacilloidea
- Family: Heteropterygidae
- Subfamily: Obriminae
- Tribe: Obrimini
- Genus: Sungaya; Zompro, 1996

Type species
- Sungaya inexpectata Zompro, 1996

Species
- Sungaya aeta; Sungaya dumagat; Sungaya ibaloi; Sungaya inexpectata

= Sungaya =

Genus of stick insects

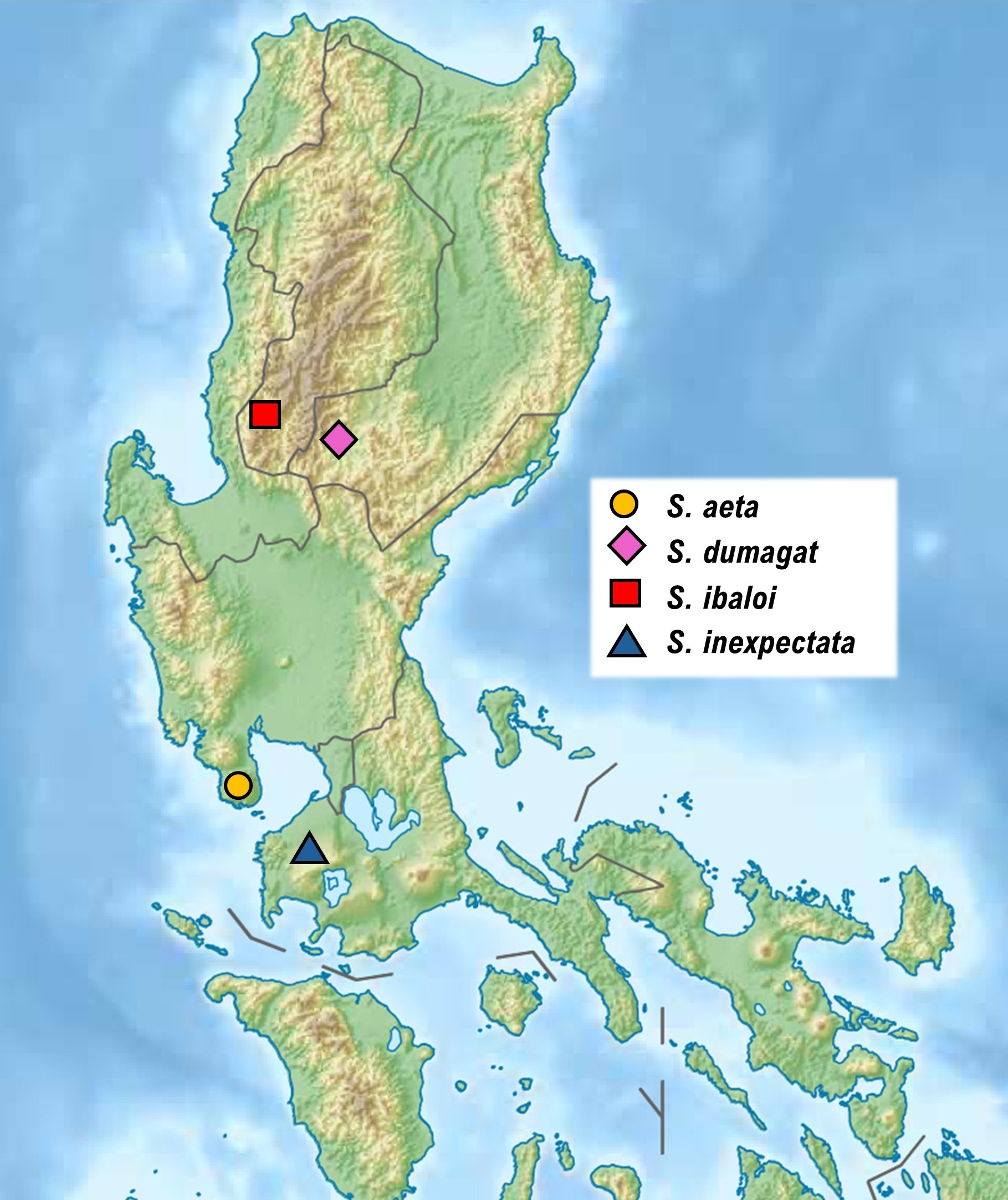
First locations of the four described Sungaya species on the island of Luzon

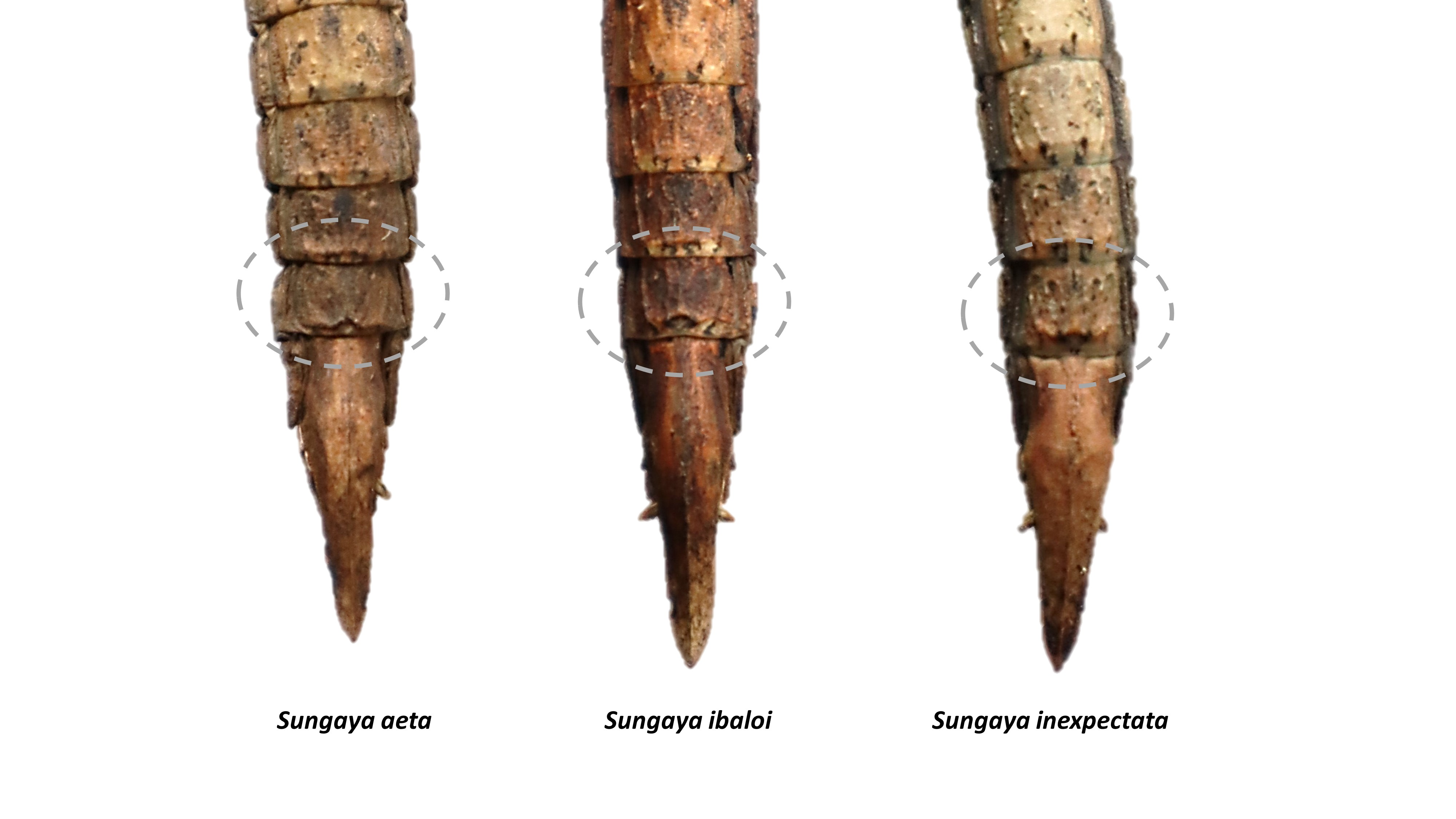
Underside of the abdomen of females of three Sungaya species with marked seventh sternite and the preopercular organ located there

Sungaya is a genus of stick insects which is endemic to the Philippine island of Luzon.

== Occurrence ==
On Luzon, the first females of Sungaya inexpectata were found in Barangay Sungay in Tagaytay. It is in the province of Cavite and not in the province of Batangas as stated in the species description. The first males were found near Mount Cayapo in the Mariveles Mountains in Baranggay Alangan of the province of Bataan in the associated township Limay. The first males were found near Mount Cayapo in the Mariveles Mountains in the Limay municipality of Bataan Province. Whether these belong to Sungaya aeta, which is also native to Bataan Province, has not yet been investigated. Sungaya ibaloi comes from Benguet province. The only known specimen of Sungaya dumagat to date is a female from the province of Nueva Vizcaya. Whether specimens found near Imuguan Falls in Nueva Vizcaya Province belong to this or another species has not yet been investigated. Images published by Adryn Nebrida show another, still undescribed species from Baguio City, Benguet Province.

== Features ==
The females of the known species reach lengths of 7.1 to 8.5 centimetres (2.8 to 3.3 in) millimeters and a weight of around five grams. At the end of their abdomen is the beak-shaped secondary ovipositor that is typical of all species of the Obriminae, which surrounds the actual ovipositor. The shape of the preopercular organ located on the seventh sternite of the abdomen is species-typical. The slimmer males remain significantly smaller and are 5.0 to 6.1 centimetres (2.0 to 2.4 in) long. In habitus, Sungaya species closely resemble to those of the sister genus Trachyaretaon. Oliver Zompro leave out the genus he described in an identification key for the Obriminae published in 2004 in his work on the former partial order Areolatae. Only in the identification key of the eggs are these differentiated from those of the other genera. In later works, the two genera are differentiated from one another based on the dimensions of the thorax. In the stockier Trachyaretaon in both sexes the mesonotum is more than twice as wide in the rear part as its front edge. In the generally slimmer Sungaya, the mesonotum is only moderately widened towards the back and at its widest point is no more than twice the width of the front edge. In Trachyaretaon males, the mesothorax is a maximum of 2.5 times longer than the prothorax. In those from Sungaya the mesothorax is more than 2.5 times longer than the prothorax.

In Sungaya inexpectata, Sungaya ibaloi and Sungaya dumagat only specimens with light beige to dark brown patterns are known. Sungaya aeta or the sexual strains introduced since 2008 as Sungaya sp. “Lowland” are much more contrasting and significantly more variable in color. Dark brown to black tones usually dominate, which are complemented by light brown areas and black or white bands on the legs or body. Females are particularly noticeable with either a very narrow white or a rather broader beige longitudinal stripe across their entire body. Females in which green tones dominate the basic color are possible but rare. In addition, nymphs can be found with a chestnut to red-brown basic color. This coloring loses its intensity at the latest during molting to the imago. Males can be similarly patterned and colored. Contrast and intensity of the coloring are lower.

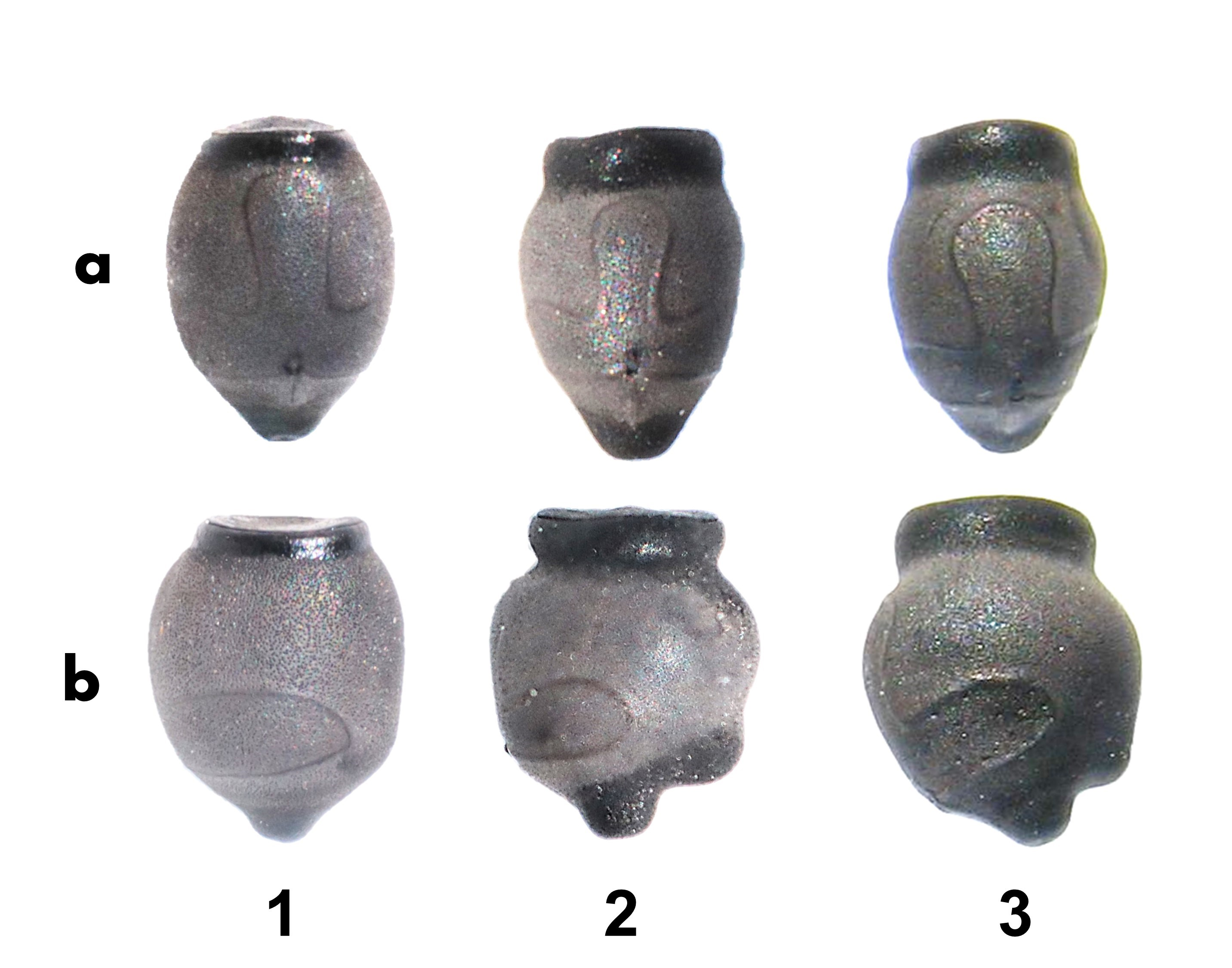
Eggs of (1) Sungaya aeta, (2) Sungaya ibaloi and (3) Sungaya inexpectata in (a) dorsal and (b) lateral view

The eggs described from Sungaya aeta, Sungaya ibaloi and Sungaya inexpectata can be easily distinguished from each other. Compared to the eggs of other Obrimini genera, the black-colored and black-edged lid (operculum), the gray, bulbous egg capsule that tapers to a blunt end at the posterior pole and the three-armed micropylar plate are typical for the genus.

The stock known as Sungaya sp. “Lowland” (presumably Sungaya aeta) was hybridized with a stock was then known as Trachyaretaon sp. 'Negros' referred to as Trachyaretaon negrosanon. The two accidentally created females grew into adult animals, but turned out to be infertile and did not produce any eggs.

- - Eubulides
  - - Obrimini sp. 'Negros'
      = Trachyaretaon negrosanon
    - - Sungaya
        - - Sungaya sp. (Limay „Lowland“)
          - Sungaya aeta (Ilanin Forest)
        - - Sungaya ibaloi (Benguet)
          - Sungaya inexpectata (Sungay „Highland“)
      - Trachyaretaon

Relationships of the four Sungaya species or stocks and their sister genera investigated so far according to Sarah Bank et al (2021), species assignment according to Frank H. Hennemann (2023)

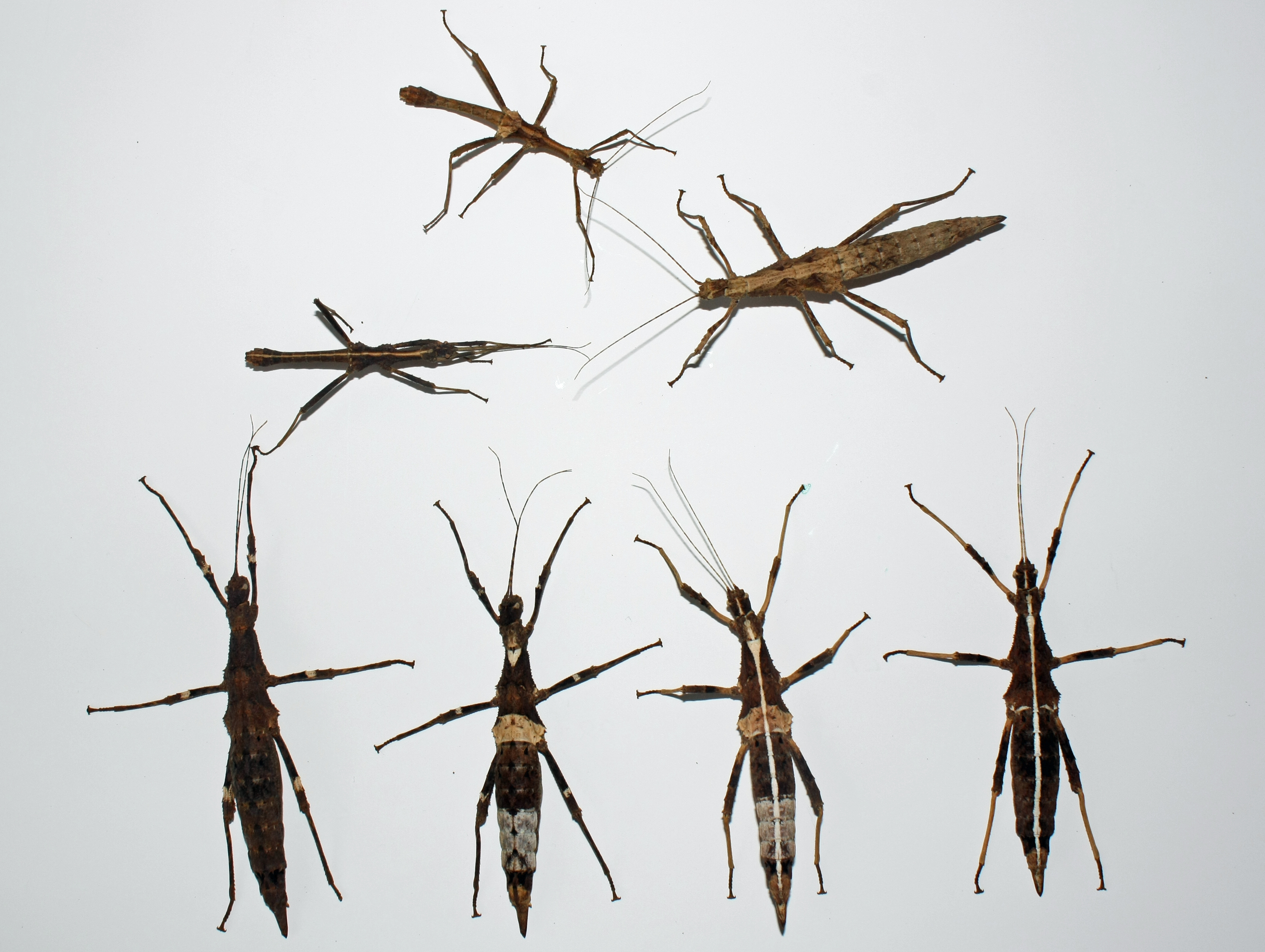
Different specimens of Sungaya: top right female of Sungaya inexpectata „Highland“, all others Sungaya aeta or there hybrids with S. inexpectata

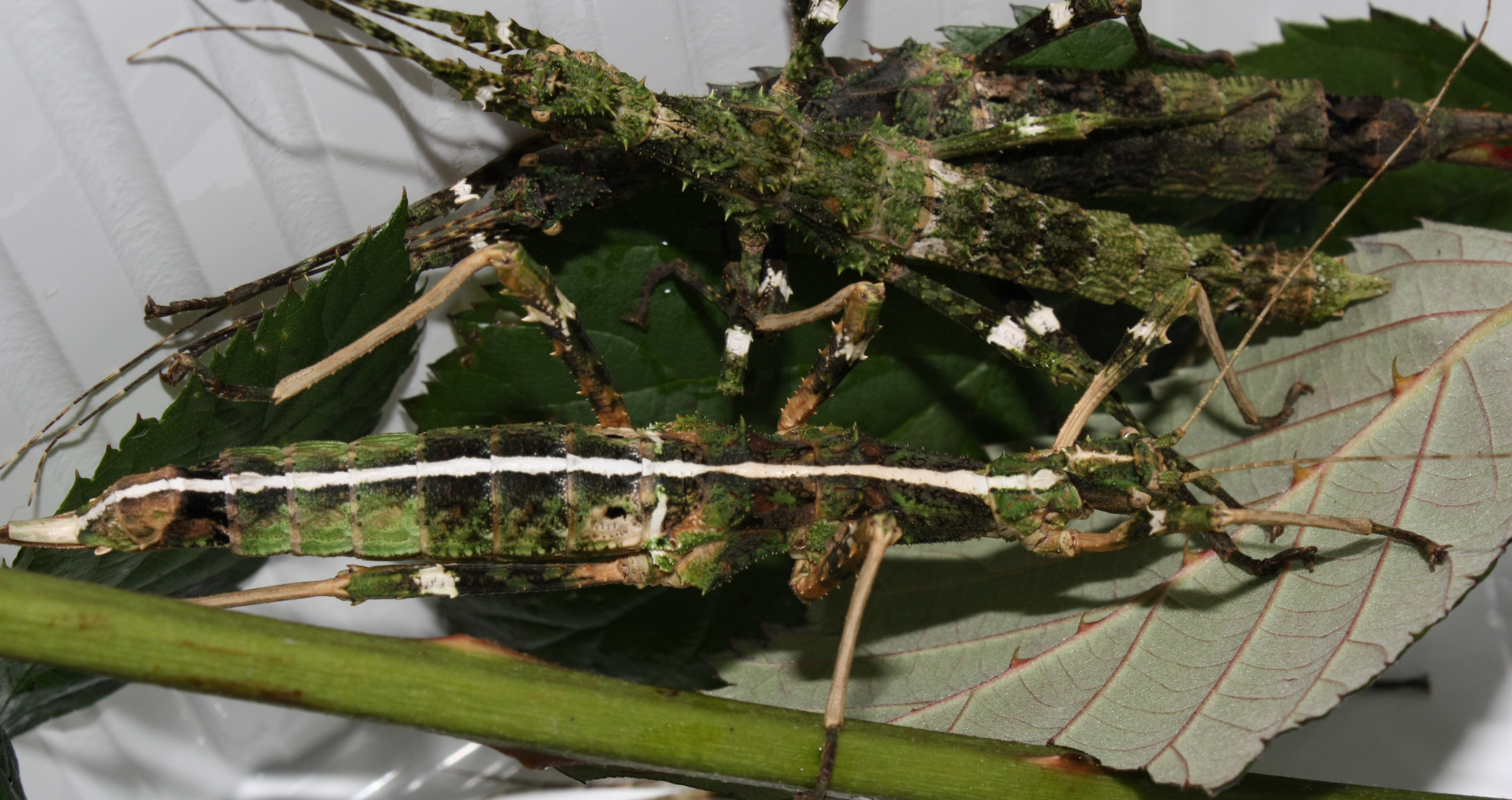
Green females of mixed stock of Sungaya sp. „Lowland“

== Taxonomy ==
Zompro described the genus and its type species Sungaya inexpectata in 1996 based on two specimens found in 1995. An adult female collected on October 7, 1995 was declared as the holotype of the species, a female nymph collected on September 8, 1995 and two offspring süpecimens of the holotype were declared as paratypes. All four are deposited in Zompro's collection. In a later publication in 2008, of which Zompro is the editor, it is announced that the holotype will be given to the Museum of Natural History of the University of the Philippines in Los Baños, where also the first two males collected by Eusebio, Yap and Larona are deposited. It has not been investigated which species these males belong to. The generic name “Sungaya” refers to the location where the holotype was found in Barangay Sungay in the municipality of Talisay, which belongs to the province of Batangas. After it was controversial for a long time whether the animals collected in the meantime all belonged to the type species of the genus, Sarah Bank et al show in their genetic analysis based studies to clarify the phylogeny of the Heteropterygidae, that in addition to this one, there are two to three other previously undescribed species. Frank H. Hennemann described in 2023 two of these species, as well as one by Bank et al. not examined. The species known as Sungaya sp. 2 (Limay “Lowland”) were not described because it could be a breeding strain hybridized with Sungaya inexpectata and there were no wild-caught specimens. Holotypes and, where available, paratypes of the three newly described species are deposited in the Museum of Natural Sciences in Brussels.

The species described so far are:

- Sungaya aeta Hennemann, 2023
- Sungaya dumagat Hennemann, 2023
- Sungaya ibaloi Hennemann, 2023
- Sungaya inexpectata Zompro, 1996

== Terraristic ==
From 1996 to 2009, all breeding animals of the genus were traced back to the adult female Sungaya inexpectata found by Zompro. It laid four eggs from which three nymphs hatched. Two of them raised to adult females. They werde the basis for a breeding line called Sungaya inexpectata "Highland". The Phasmid Study Group lists the species or this strain under the PSG number 195. Sungaya inexpectata "Highland" is now only kept very rarely.

The sexual strain from Bataan, which has been known since 2008, has been imported several times and is usually referred to as Sungaya inexpectata "Lowland", more rarely as Limay "Lowland". The introduced strains were crossed both with each other and with Sungaya inexpectata “Highland” before attention was paid to pure strains. These mixed strains make up the majority of the animals now kept and are among the most commonly kept stick insects. In order to have a pure breeding strain from the region, a new strain from Morong, Bataan was brought into breeding in 2017, which was initially named Sungaya inexpectata 'Ilanin Forest' or Sungaya sp. 'Ilanin Forest'. Hennemann described this stock, which had already been recognized as a separate species in 2021, as Sungaya aeta, so that it must be completely referred to as Sungaya aeta 'Ilanin Forest'.

In 2013, the Frenchman Thierry Heitzmann, who lives in the Philippines, found animals later known as Sungaya inexpectata, 'Benguet' or Sungaya sp. 'Benguet' were introduced. They were drawn up and distributed for the first time by Bruno Kneubühler, a Swiss phasmid breeder. The strain is kept and bred according to its origin and was described by Hennemann in 2023 as Sungaya ibaloi after its species status was confirmed in 2021.

The genus is one of the most commonly kept stick insects, with Sungaya aeta mostly being kept, although rarely as pure breeding strains of the same species or location. All species are easy to keep and to breed. Almost all common food plants for stick insects are accepted.
