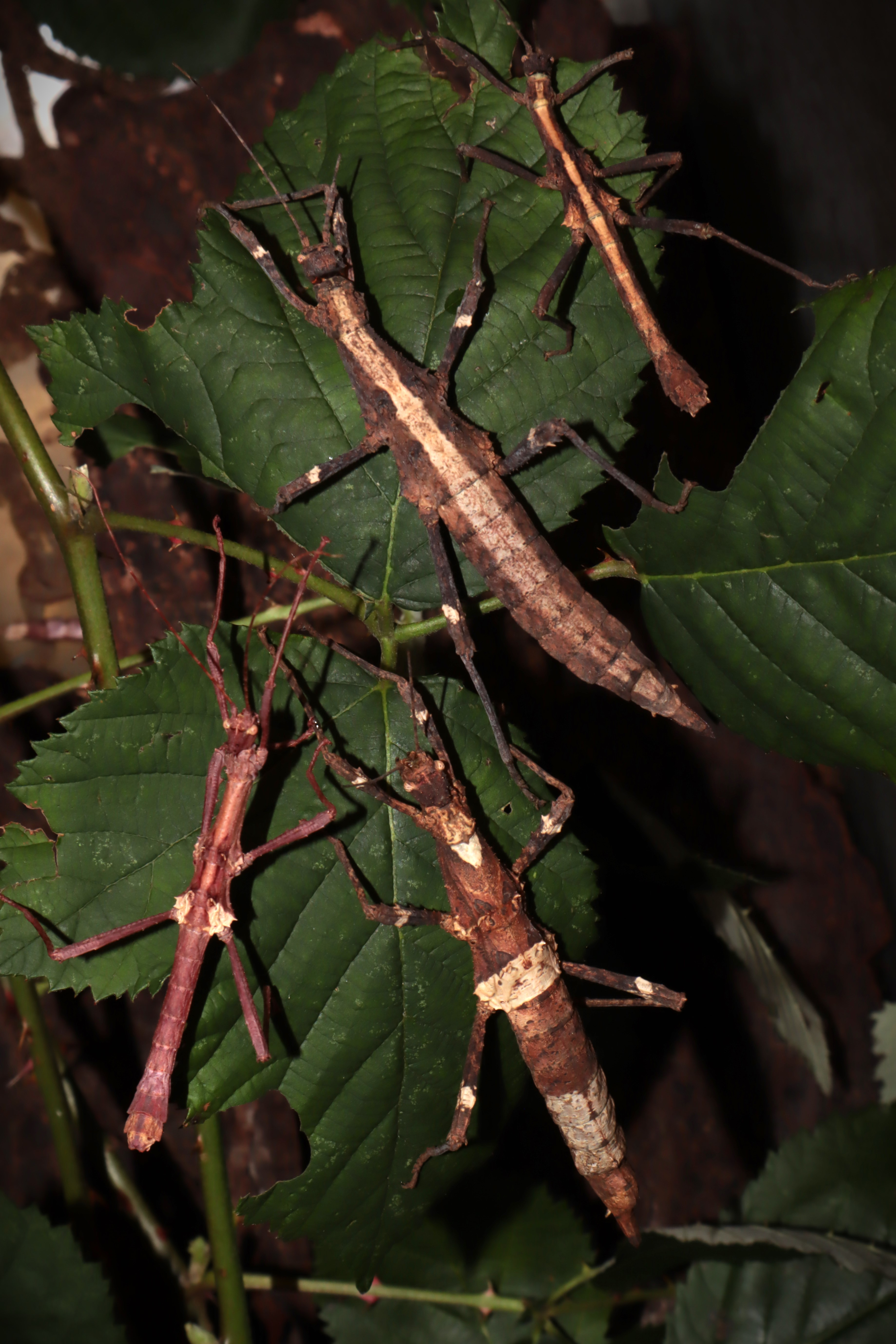
- Sungaya aeta, two different colored pairs

Scientific classification
- Kingdom: Animalia
- Phylum: Arthropoda
- Clade: Pancrustacea
- Class: Insecta
- Order: Phasmatodea
- Family: Heteropterygidae
- Subfamily: Obriminae
- Tribe: Obrimini
- Genus: Sungaya
- Species: S. aeta

Binomial name
- Sungaya aeta Hennemann, 2023

= Sungaya aeta =

Species of stick insect

Sungaya aeta is a species of the family of the Heteropterygidae. Although only described in 2023, it has been one of the most common stick insect species kept in the terrariums of enthusiasts.

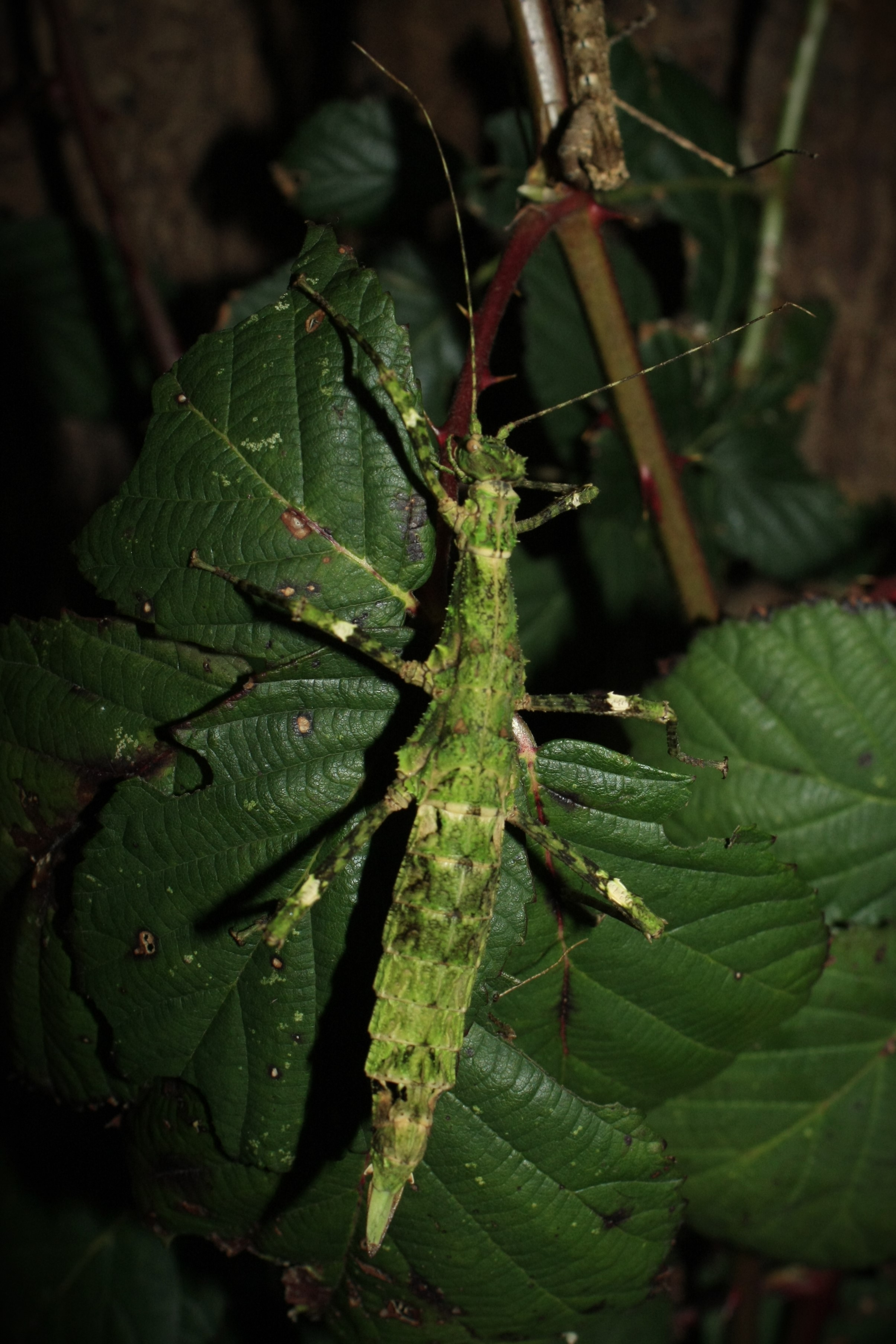
Green female

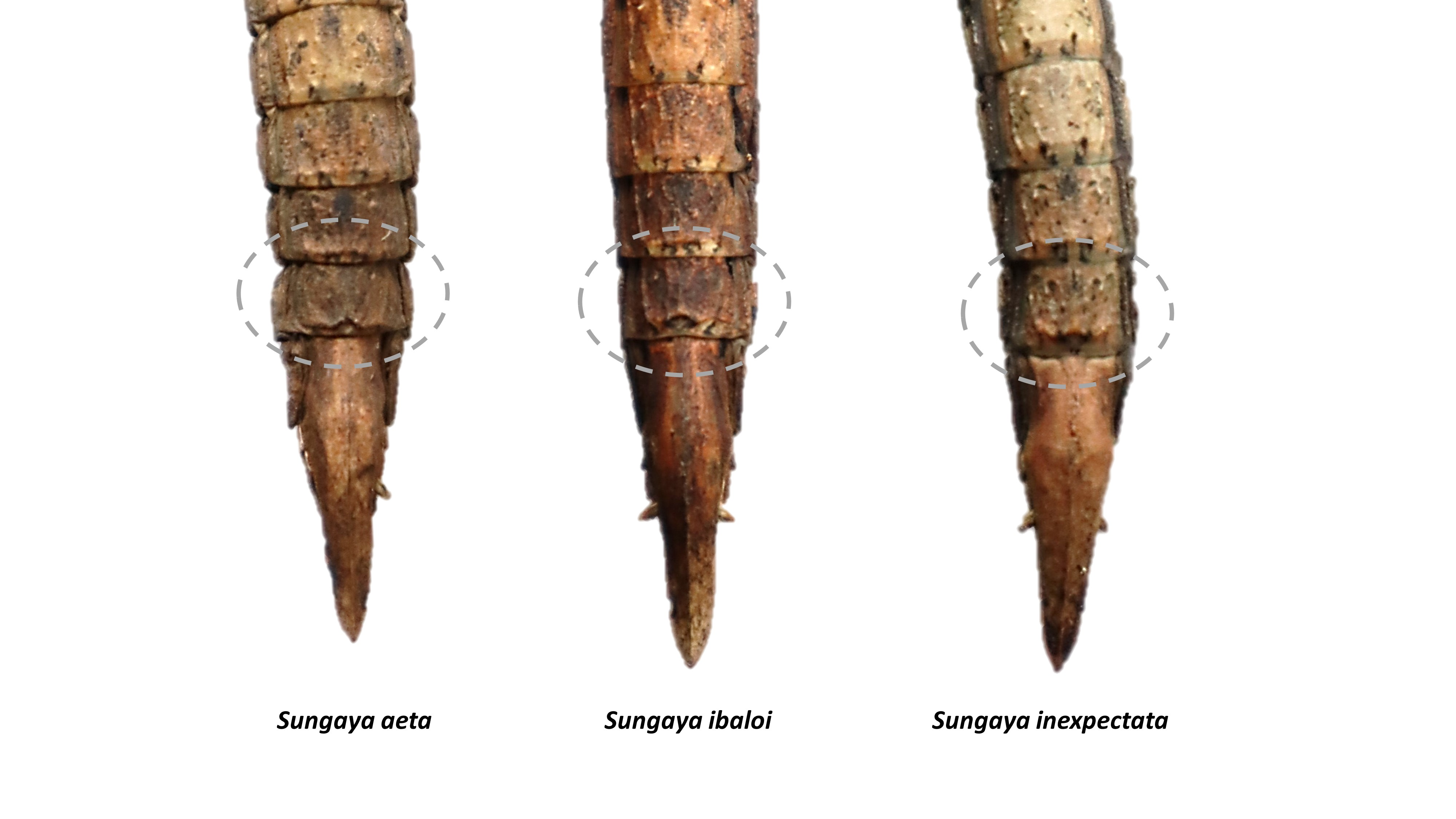
Ends of abdomen of females of the three most common Sungaya species with marked seventh sternite and the preopercular organ located there

== Discovery and occurrence ==
The first animals that can be safely assigned to this species were observed at the beginning of June 2008 by Thierry Heitzmann at 100 to 250 metres (330 to 820 ft) elevation in Ilanin Forest near Morong in the province of Bataan on the Filipino island Luzon. Already at the beginning of 2008, some specimens, including the first known males of the genus, were collected by Orlando L. Eusebio, S. A. Yap and A. R. Larona on Mount Cayapo in the Mariveles Mountains in the Barangay Alangan in the municipality of Limay, which also belongs to the province of Bataan. It has not yet been possible to clarify which species these animals belong to. The same applies to animals from other origins such as Imuguan Falls in the province of Nueva Vizcaya.

== Description ==
The females reach a length of 7.1 to 8.4 centimetres (2.8 to 3.3 in). At the end of the abdomen is the beak-shaped secondary ovipositor, typical of species of the Obriminae. The females are very variable in pattern and color and are much more contrasting than the males. Dark brown to black tones usually dominate, which are complemented by light brown areas and black or white bands on the legs or body. Females are particularly noticeable with a very narrow white or slightly wider cream-colored longitudinal stripe across their entire body. Occasionally specimens with a reddish or green base color occur. Both colors are most intense in the nymphs up to the subadult stage. While the green coloration occurs more frequently in adult females, the reddish coloration is more noticeable in adult males. They are slimmer than the females and remain significantly smaller with length 5.1 to 6.1 centimetres (2.0 to 2.4 in). Their Base color is usually also light or medium brown and show an often indistinct longitudinal line of varying width on the meso- and metanotum, which can be, depending on the base color, is dark brown (on a light background) or light brown (on a dark background). In their habit they closely resemble the males of the sister genus Trachyaretaon. Both sexes are wingless and armed with short spines on the meso- and metanotum. These are a little sharper in males. Especially noticeable is the spiked crown on the back of the head that is typical for the genus.

The females can be distinguished from the representatives of the other species, among other things, by the shape of the preopercular organ. In Sungaya aeta it is formed by a distinct, almost semi-circular median excavation at posterior margin of sternum edge of the seventh sternum of the abdomen. In Sungaya inexpectata this is rather triangular posteromedian excavation and in Sungaya ibaloi it is small, shallow and with a pair of tubercles. In addition, the spines on the mesonotum are larger than those of the more elongated and long-legged Sungaya inexpectata. The males also appear a bit stockier. Their mesothorax only reaches 2.6 times the length of the prothorax, while in the males of Sungaya ibaloi it reaches three times the length of the prothorax.

== Reproduction ==
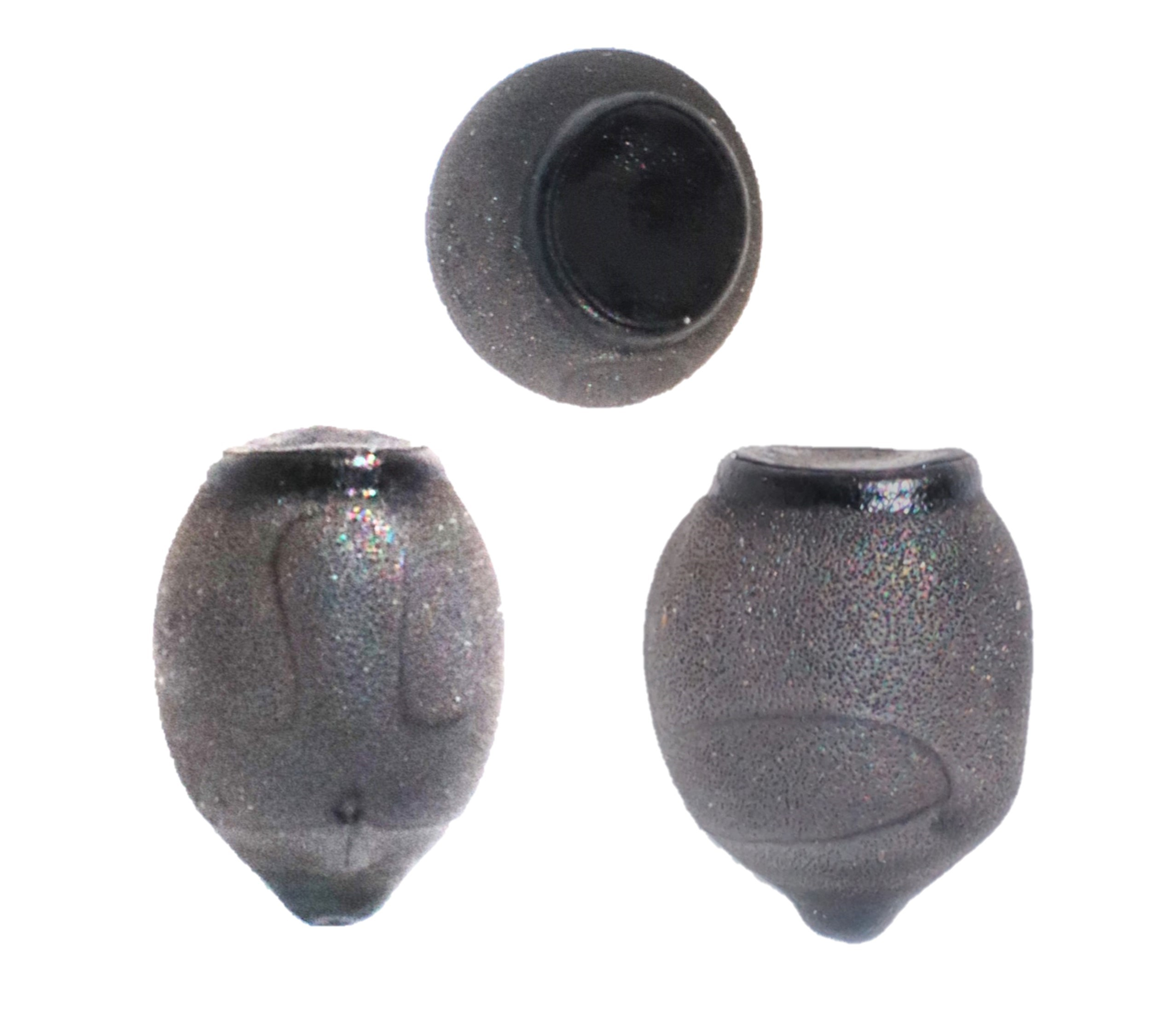
Egg of Sungaya aeta: view from above to the lid (operculum), left in dorsal and right in lateral view

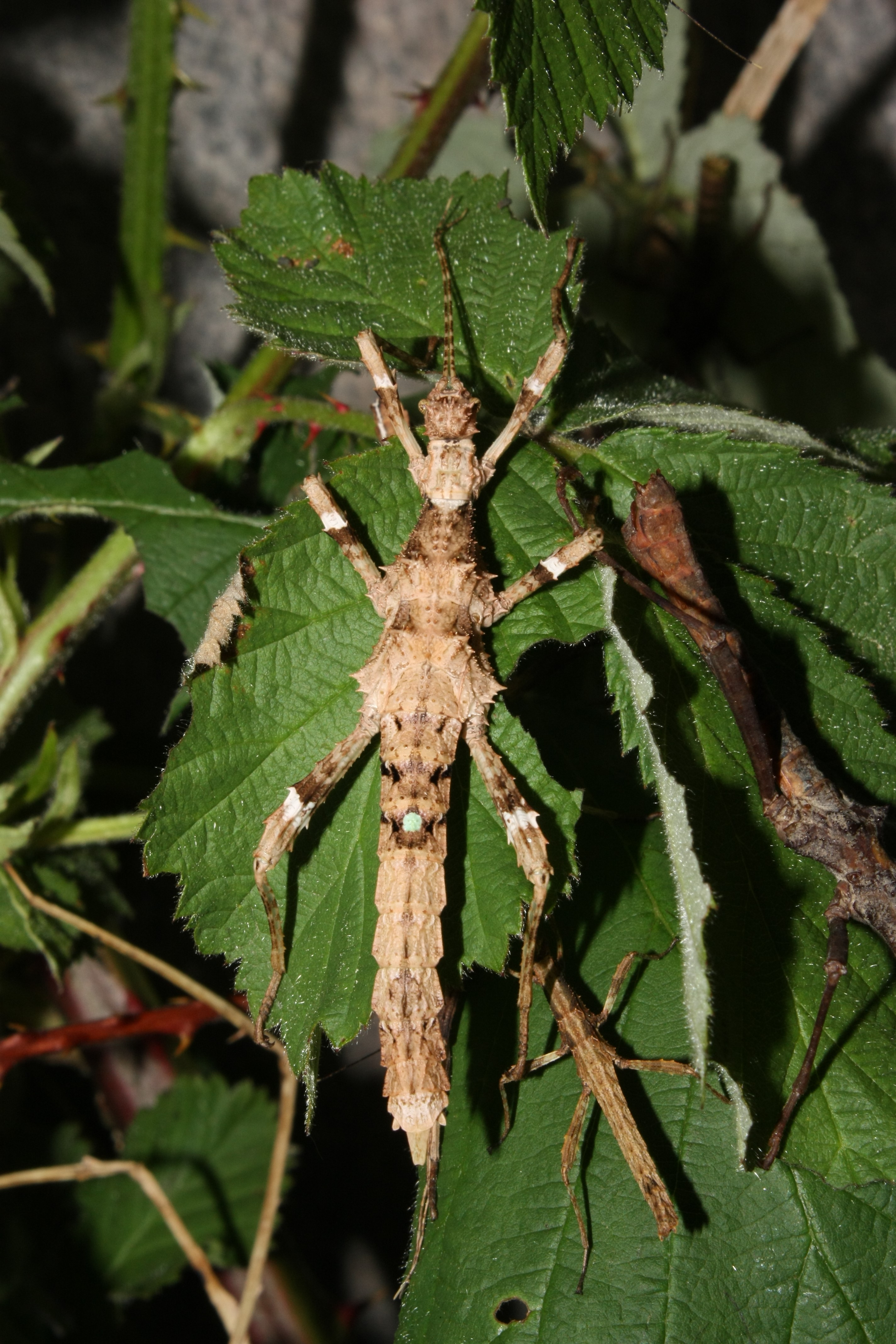
Juvenile hybrid from Trachyaretaon negrosanon and Sungaya aeta

The eggs, which are laid in the ground using the ovipositor and are bulbous in the middle, are relatively large and can be easily distinguished from those of the other Sungaya species by their shape. They are 4.8 to 4.9 millimetres (0.19 to 0.19 in) long,3.4 to 3.5 millimetres (0.13 to 0.14 in) wide and 3.7 to 3.8 millimetres (0.15 to 0.15 in) high. The micropylar plate is wide, inverted T-shaped and 3 millimetres (0.12 in) long. The operculum called cover sits on the egg sloping towards the ventral side, creating an opercular angle of about 5 degrees. The nymphs hatch after four to six months and are then already 17 millimetres (0.67 in) long. Newly hatched nymphs can be very light or more dark gray in color. The increasingly bold and contrasting patterns are most intense in the final stages before imaginal molt. The entire development into imago takes around three to four months.

In 2011 Sungay aeta was hybridized with Trachyaretaon negrosanon, a then undescribed Obrimini species from Negros. The two unintentionally created females grew into adults, but turned out to be sterile and did not produce any eggs.

== Taxonomy ==
Sarah Bank et al. included four samples from different Sungaya stocks in their study published in 2021 based on genetic analysis to clarify the phylogeny of the Heteropterygidae. They were able to show that, in addition to the type species of the genus named there as Sungaya inexpectata (Sungay "Highland"), three other previously undescribed species exist. Frank H. Hennemann described two of these species in 2023. One of these was that called Sungaya sp. (Ilanin Forest), which he described as Sungaya aeta. Following the results of Bank et al. their sister taxon would be a species named there as Sungaya sp. (Limay "Lowland"). Whether these are animals that respond to the 2008 Eusebio et al. collected animals go back or even a pure strain or even animals created through hybridization remains an open question. Since Hennemann did not have these animals, he decided not to process them.

The chosen specific name "aeta" is dedicated to the Aeta people who live in various parts of the island of Luzon. The Aeta are considered to be the earliest known migrants or inhabitants of the Philippines. Of the specimens collected in June 2008, one female is deposited as holotype, as well as four females, five males and three eggs as paratypes in the Museum of Natural Sciences in Brussels. Additional paratypes include six males and six females bred by Joachim Breessel in 2015. Hennemann's specimen collection contains the following paratypes: a female, a male and an egg from the 2008 collected animals from Ilanin Forest, five females of the F1 generation from breeding by Rob Krijns from 2009, as well as nine females and eight males of the F2 generation from his own breeding in 2010.

== In terraristics ==
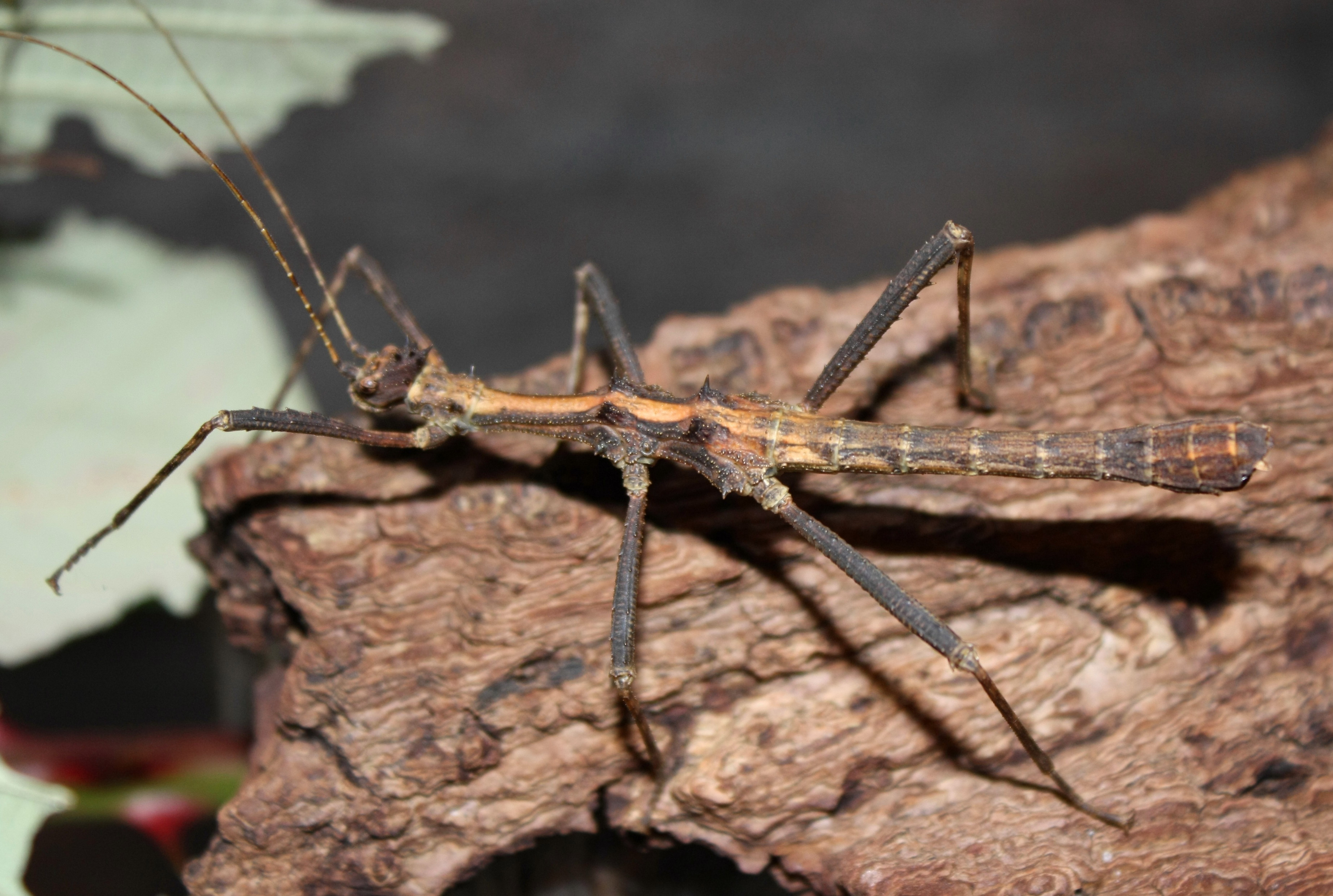
Male of the breeding line known as "Lowland"

The first known strain of the species was imported from the lowlands of Ilanin Forest in 2008. In contrast to the first breeding strain, the real Sungaya inexpectata, which was found at an altitude of around 400 metres (1,300 ft) in the "Highland", all sexual breeding strains of the genus imported until at least 2013 were called Sungaya inexpectata "Lowland" or, more rarely, Limay "Lowland", regardless of their exact origin. The various introduced strains were crossed with each other before attention was paid to strains of pure origin. Therefore, a new strain was bred from the region in 2017, known as Sungaya inexpectata 'Ilanin Forest' or Sungaya sp. 'Ilanin Forest'. Only since the description of the species in 2023 has the name Sungaya aeta 'Ilanin Forest' become increasingly common for this breeding line.

The species is very easy to keep and to breed. For this reason and because of its color and pattern variability, together with the mixed strains of the genus, it is one of the most widespread stick insects in hobbyists' terrariums. Temperatures of 22 to 27 °C (72 to 81 °F) and humidity between 60 and 80 percent are sufficient for breeding.

The leaves of bramble and other Rosaceae are suitable as fodder plants, as well as those of hazel, common beech and hornbeam, Norway maple, ivy, dogwood, common ash and others. To lay eggs, a slightly moist layer of earth or sand should cover the ground.
