= Hennemann =

Hennemann is a surname. Notable people with the surname include:

- Charles Hennemann (1866–1938), American track and field athlete
- Frank H. Hennemann (born 1978) is a German entomologist
- Franziskus Hennemann (1882–1951), German Roman Catholic missionary and Titular Bishop in South Africa
- Marcelo Hennemann (born 1962), Brazilian tennis player

== See also ==
- Henneman
