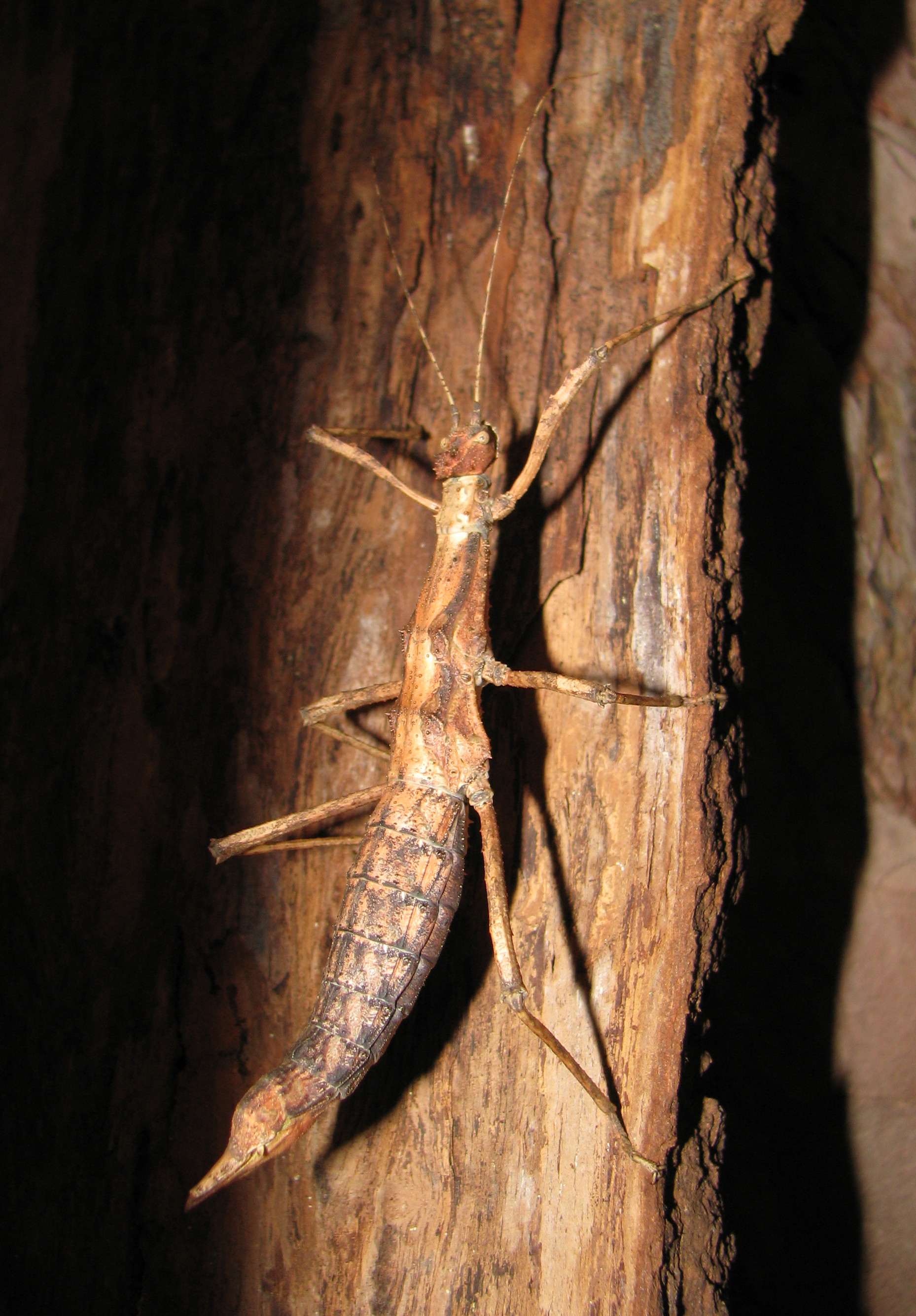
- Female of Sungaya inexpectata

Scientific classification
- Kingdom: Animalia
- Phylum: Arthropoda
- Clade: Pancrustacea
- Class: Insecta
- Order: Phasmatodea
- Family: Heteropterygidae
- Genus: Sungaya
- Species: S. inexpectata

Binomial name
- Sungaya inexpectata Zompro, 1996

= Sungaya inexpectata =

Species of stick insect

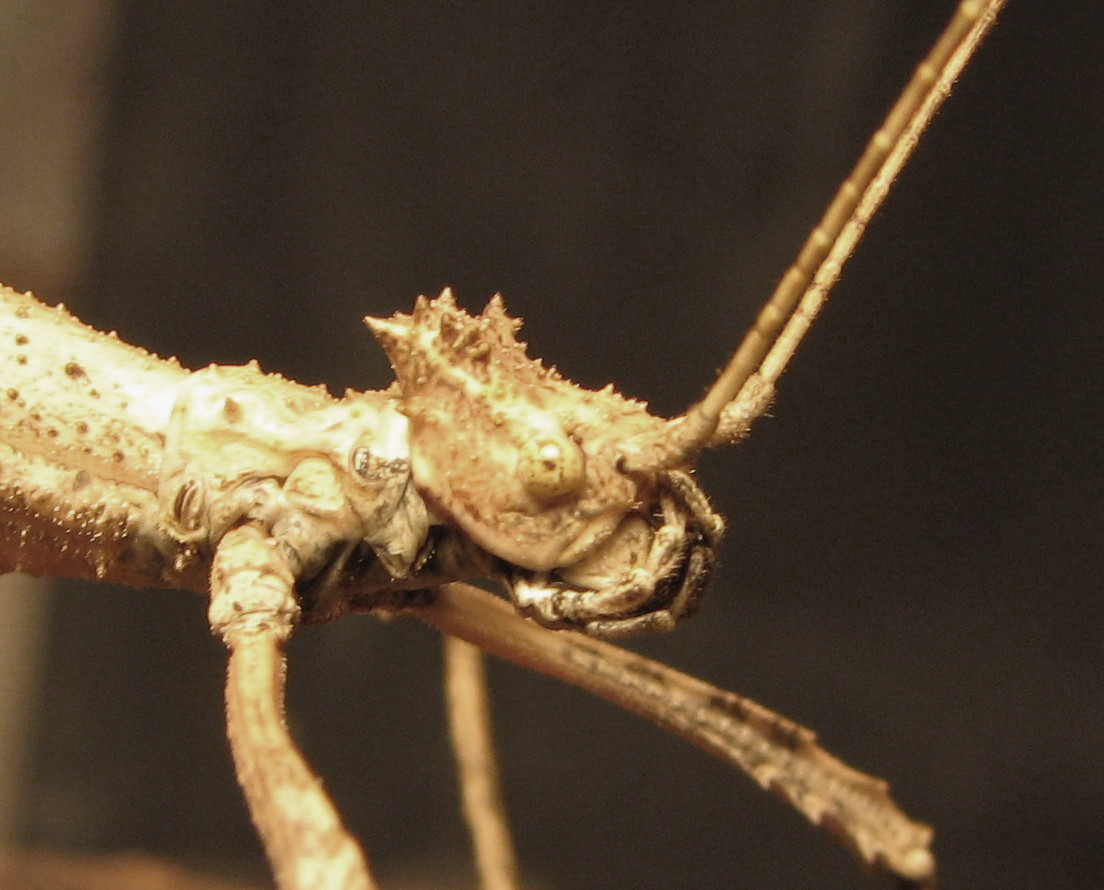
Portrait

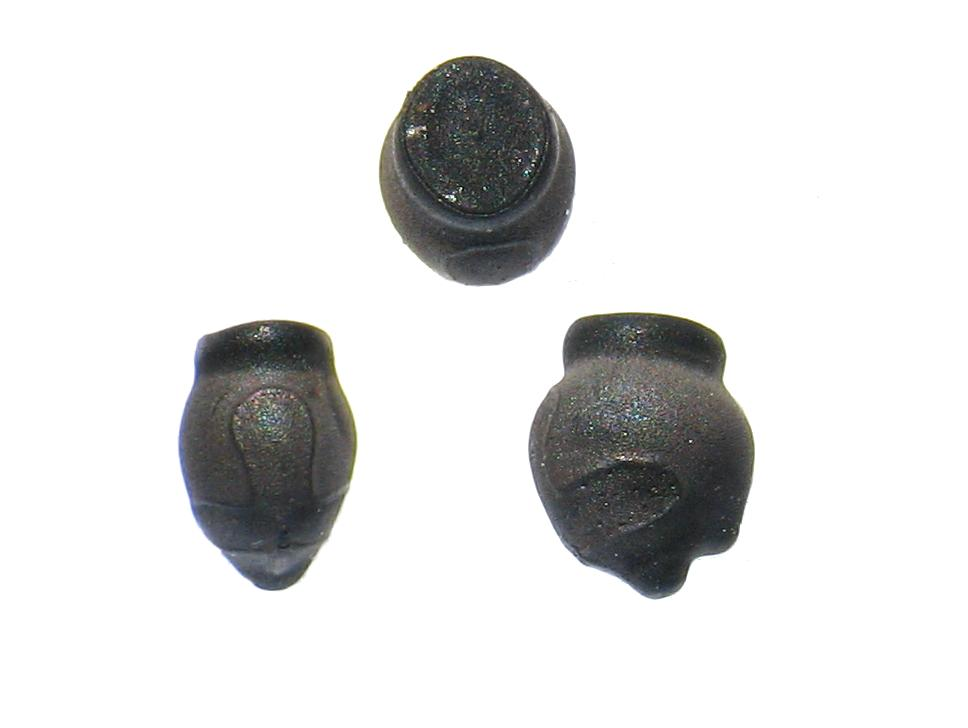
Egg: view from above to the lid (operculum), left in dorsal and right in lateral view

Sungaya inexpectata is a species of stick insects and the type species of genus Sungaya. The species name is derived from the Latin as "inexpectatus" and means "unexpected". Its common name is sunny stick insect, derived from the less commonly used sungay stick insect, which in turn refers to the place where the species was found.

== Discovery and occurrence ==
On September 8, 1995, Oliver Zompro collected a nymph of this previously unknown species in Sungay a Barangay of Tagaytay City in the Province of Cavite on the Filipino island Luzon. This died a short time later due to a failed molting during transport. On October 7, 1995, he was almost at the same location where he collected an adult female. Zompro incorrectly assigned the discovery location (Sungay, Tagaytay) to the province of Batangas, which is located much further south. This leads to incorrect identification of the location of the breeding line that emerged from the adult female. It is also not stated whether the exact location is in the Barangay Sungay East or Sungay West. Zompro found further females in 1999 near the original discovery location near the Taal Lake in the jungle near Tagaytay on ferns.

== Features ==
The females reach a length of 8.0 to 8.5 centimetres (3.1 to 3.3 in) and a weight of around five grams. At the end of the abdomen they have a beaked secondary ovipositor, typical of species of the Obriminae, which surrounds the primary ovipositor. The nymphs and the freshly molted imago of the form known since 1995 are very light (beige). As they grow older, adult females become increasingly darker. What is striking is the crown of spines on the back of the head and the four flat spines on the meso- and metanotum. In light-colored females, these are often surrounded by a brown diamond pattern.

== Reproduction ==
The currently known representatives of the species reproduce through parthenogenesis. The first offspring of the wild-caught specimens laid the amphora-shaped, roughly 4.5 millimetres (0.18 in) long and 3.7 millimetres (0.15 in) wide, relatively large eggs approximately every two weeks in groups of 10 to 12 eggs in the ground. Later generations laid their eggs individually into the damp earth. After 4 to 6 months the nymphs hatch, which are already 17 millimetres (0.67 in) long when they hatch. Newly hatched nymphs, like the fresh adult females, are very brightly colored. The entire development into takes about three to four months.

== Taxonomy ==
Zompro described the species and genus in 1996 based on the two specimens found in 1995. The adult female was declared as holotype of the species, the recently collected female nymph and two offspring specimens of the holotype were declared as paratypes. All four are deposited in his collection, which, according to him, is affiliated with the Zoological Museum of Kiel University, although it is not available there. In a later publication, of which Zompro is the editor, it is announced that the holotype will be given to the Museum of Natural History of the University of the Philippines in Los Baños. The genus name refers to the location where the holotype was found. The species name is derived from the Latin “inexpectatus”, meaning “unexpected”.

In their genetic analysis based studies to clarify the phylogeny of the Heteropterygidae was shown by Sarah Bank et al that in addition to the species originally described, there as Sungaya inexpectata (Sungay "Highland"), two to three other species exist. According to this, a breeding stock from Benguet would be regarded as a sister species to Sungaya inexpectata to be described. Two of these, as well as one by Bank et al. not examined species were described in 2023. Sungaya ibaloi, which comes from Benguet, is therefore the sister species of Sungaya inexpectata.

== Terraristic ==
The adult female Zompro found only laid four eggs before she died. Three nymphs hatched from these, two of them grew to adult females. According to Zompro, the entire cultivated population of the species and thus of the genus for years was descended from these two females. Zompro leaves open whether he also distributed offspring from the females found on ferns at Taal Lake in 1999, which he bred successfully.

The breeding stock from the first female or its two offspring results is called "Highland", Sungay "Highland" or incorrectly "Bantangas". It is only very rarely kept. All sexual strains introduced since 2008, mostly called "Lowland", do not belong to Sungaya inexpectata.

The animals need temperatures of 22 to 27 °C (72 to 81 °F) and a humidity between 60 and 80 percent. They are most active at night. During the day they sit camouflage themselves on their food plants, which preferably have similar colors as the animals themselves. In addition to guava leaves (Psidium), the easily obtainable leaves of bramble, hazel, European beech, hornbeam, Norway maple, ivy, dogwood, ash, as well as numerous other leaves are eaten, making them suitable for terrarium keepers are very straightforward. Their food plant branches should be kept in narrow-necked vases in the terrarium and placed about every two days sprayed with water using a spray bottle. For oviposition, a good five inches high layer of damp humus-sand mixture should cover the ground. The eggs can be left in the ground or for better control can be transferred to a simple incubator.

After its introduction, the species was one of the most commonly kept stick insects and is listed by the Phasmid Study Group under the PSG number 195.

== Gallery ==
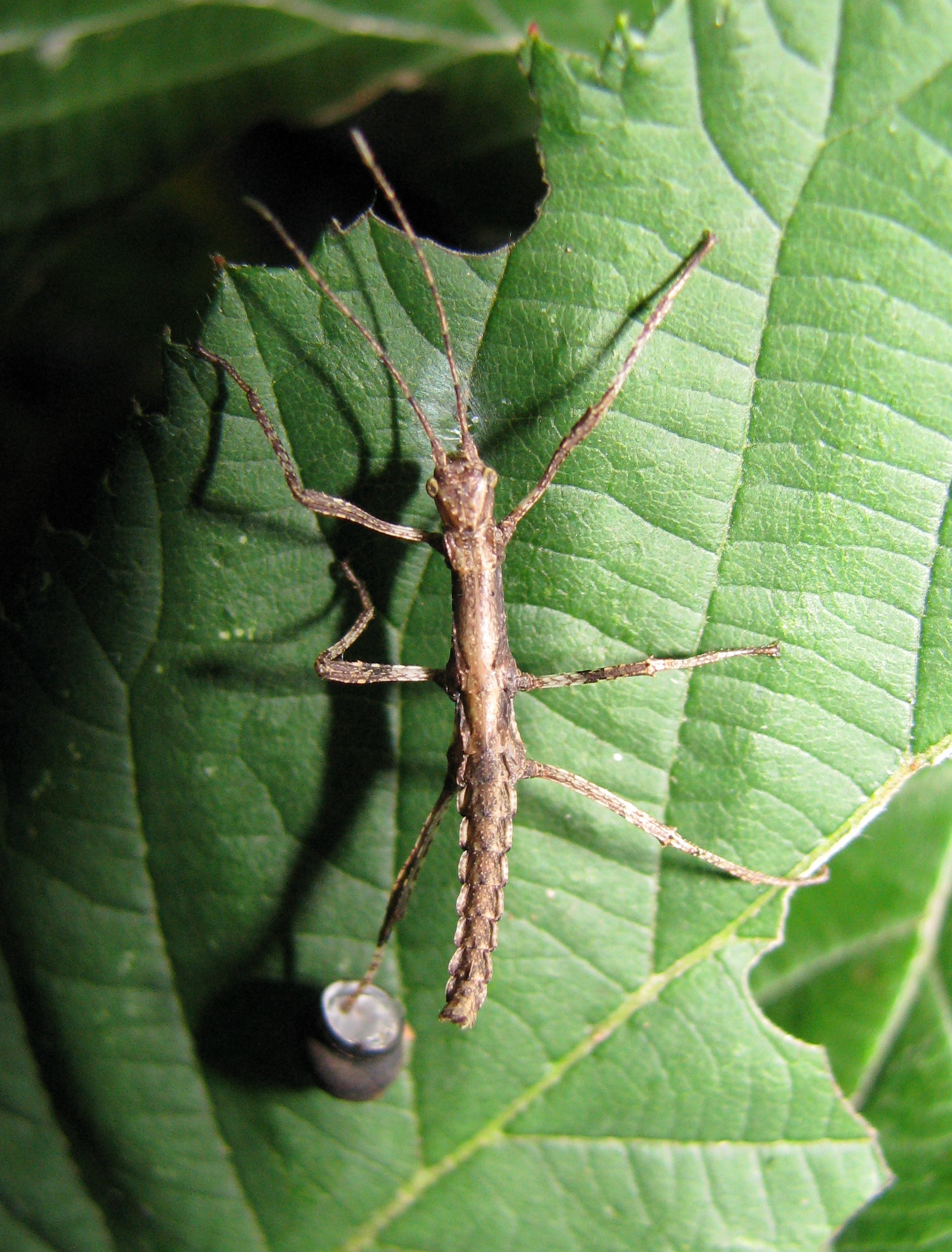
Freshly hatched nymph

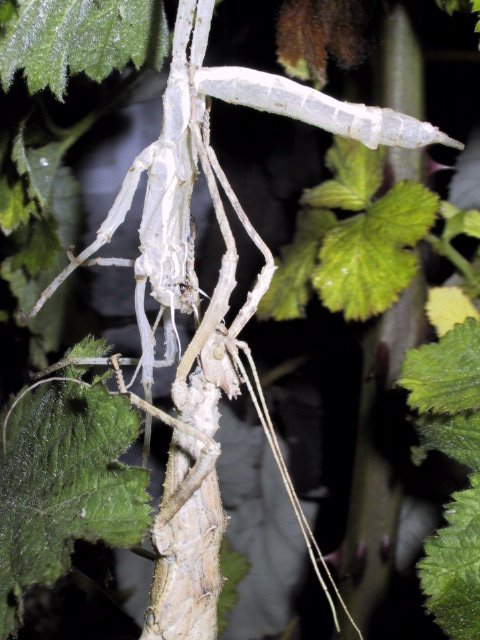
Female at exuviae

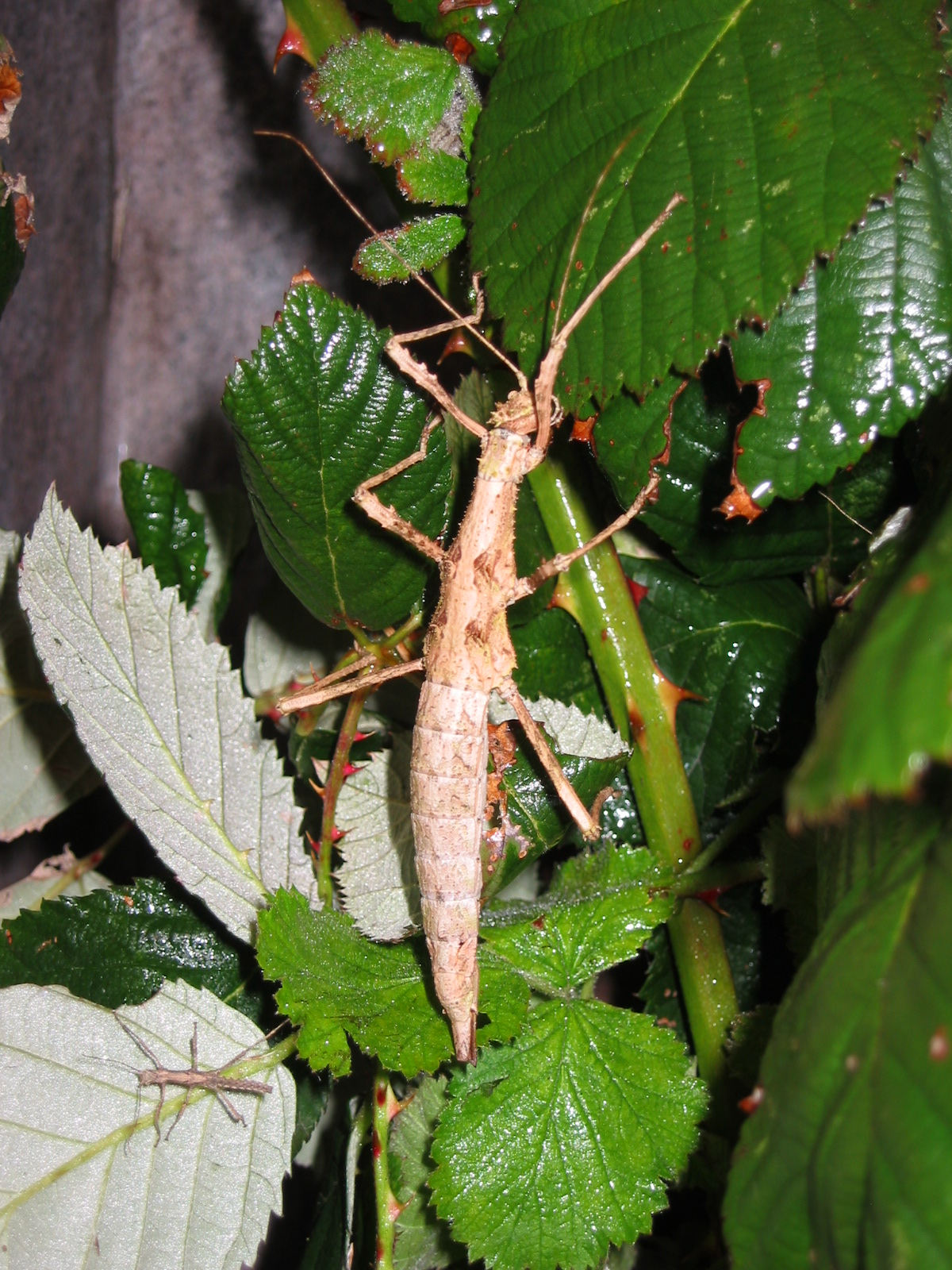
Female with nymph
