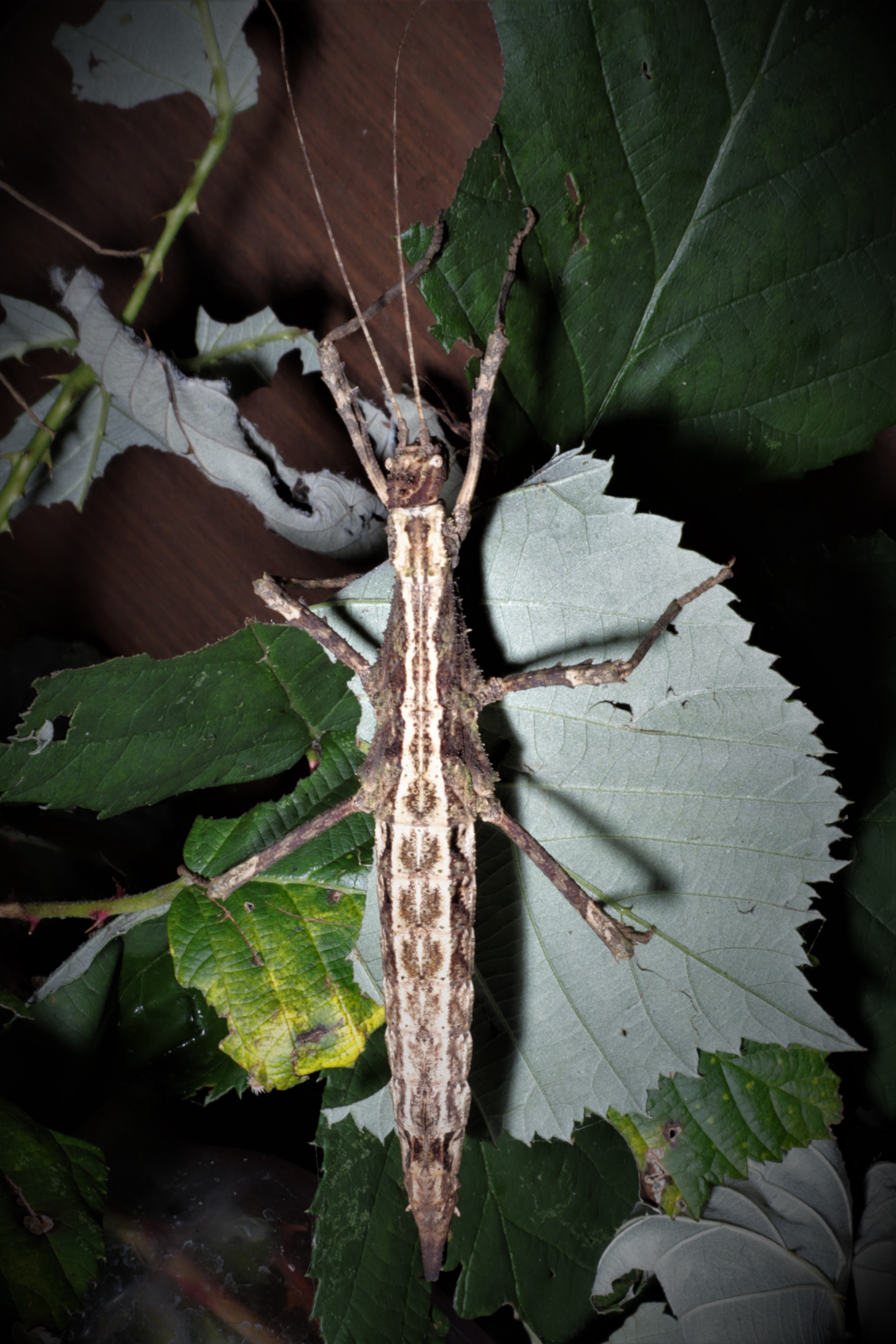
- Sungaya ibaloi, female

Scientific classification
- Kingdom: Animalia
- Phylum: Arthropoda
- Clade: Pancrustacea
- Class: Insecta
- Order: Phasmatodea
- Family: Heteropterygidae
- Genus: Sungaya
- Species: S. ibaloi

Binomial name
- Sungaya ibaloi Hennemann, 2023

= Sungaya ibaloi =

Species of stick insect

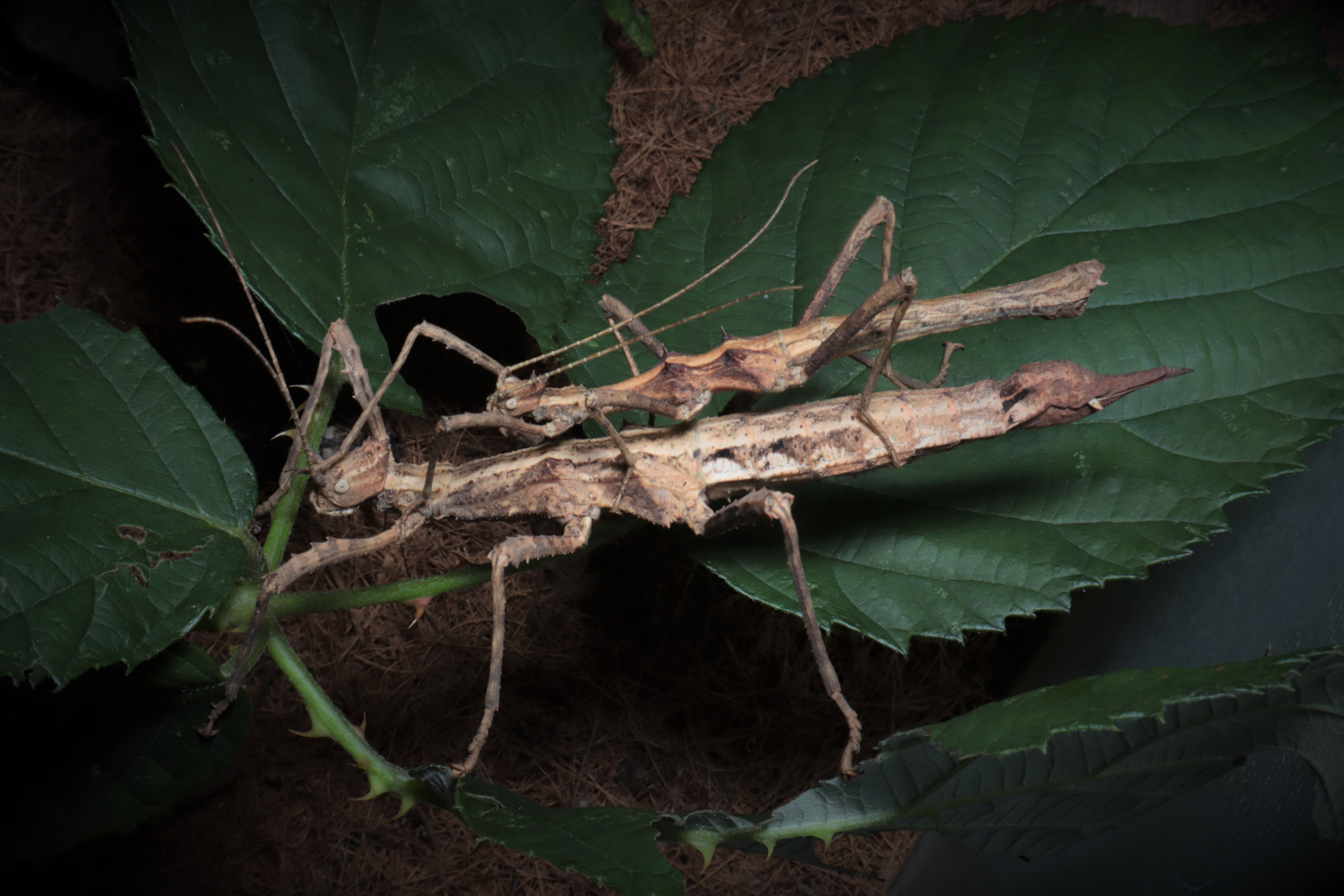
Pair

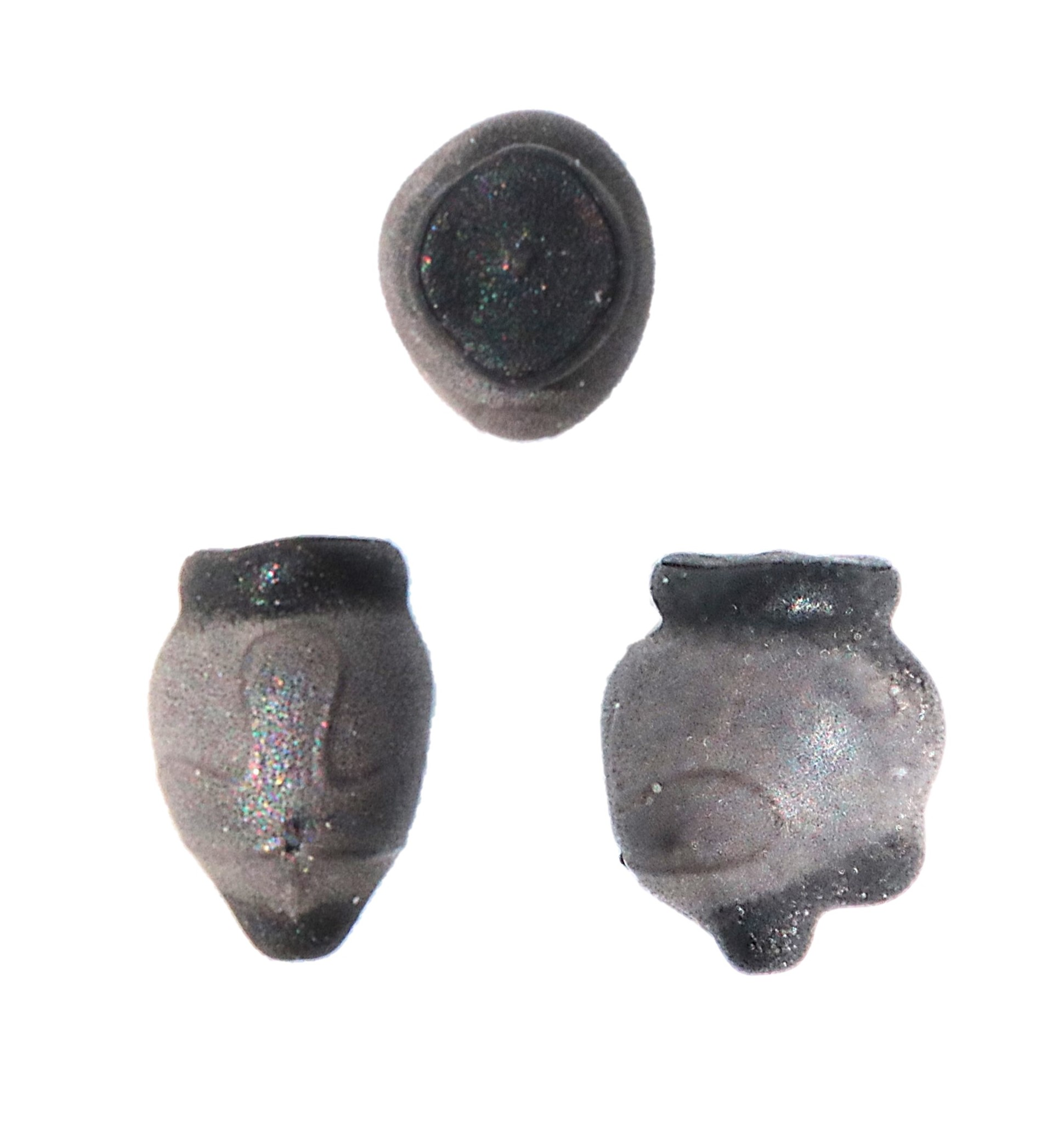
Egg: view from above to the lid (operculum), left in dorsal and right in lateral view

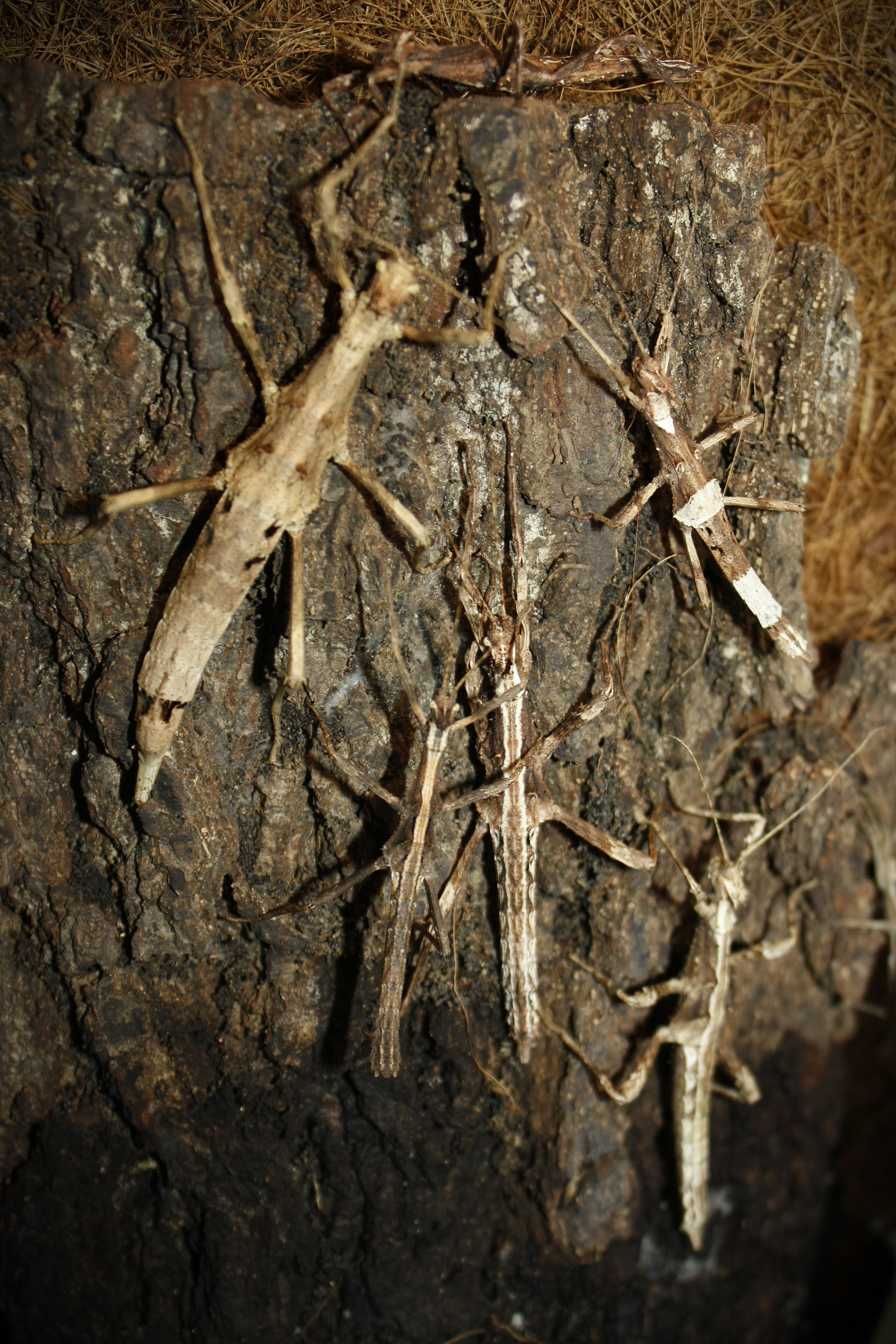
Different stages with different patterns

Sungaya ibaloi is a species of insect from the family Heteropterygidae. It is one of three very similar stick insect species of the genus Sungaya, which are often kept in the terrariums of enthusiasts. Like all representatives of the genus, the species is endemic to the Philippine island Luzón and was found there in the province of Benguet.

== Description ==
In their habit the species, like all representatives of the genus Sungaya, resemble those of the sister genus Trachyaretaon. Both sexes are also wingless and armed with short spines on the upper side of the meso- and metanotum. The females of Sungaya ibaloi reach a length of 7.2 to 8.8 centimetres (2.8 to 3.5 in). The beak-shaped secondary ovipositor at the end of the abdomen typical of species of the Obriminae, is derived from ventral by the eighth sternum, also called subgenital plate. The seventh sternum, located directly in front of it, has the preopercular organ on its posterior edge. In Sungaya ibaloi it consists of a small, shallow indentation with a pair of tubercles, while in Sungaya aeta it is formed by a distinct, almost semicircular excavation, which in Sungaya inexpectata is more triangular.

Males of Sungaya ibaloi are more slender and remain significantly smaller than females, with a length of 5.1 to 5.95 cm (2.01 to 2.34 in). They appear a little more stretched than those of Sungaya aeta. Their mesothorax reaches three times the length of the prothorax, while in the males of Sungaya aeta it only reaches 2.6 times the length of the prothorax.

Both sexes are variable in pattern and color. Almost black animals or specimens with a green or reddish base color such as those found in Sungaya aeta are not known in Sungaya ibaloi. Light to dark brown basic colors usually dominate, with light brown and white areas on the legs and body forming more or less contrasting patterns. The spiked crown on the back of the head, which is typical for the genus, is slightly more cone-shaped than in Sungaya aeta.

The eggs are relatively large at around 4.8 to 4.9 mm (0.19 to 0.19 in) long, 3.4 to 3.5 mm (0.13 to 0.14 in) wide and 3.8 to 3.9 mm (0.15 to 0.15 in) high. They differ from those of Sungaya aeta by a slightly lighter gray overall color, an additional posteroventral angle and the smaller micropylar plate. Their lateral extensions are expanded and broadly rounded at the ends, while in Sungaya aeta they are rather slender and parallel-sided. In their eggs the cover is circular, while in Sungaya ibaloi it is oval.

== Taxonomy ==
Sarah Bank et al. included four samples from different Sungaya stocks in their study published in 2021 based on genetic analysis to clarify the phylogeny of the Heteropterygidae. They were able to show that, in addition to the type species of the genus named there as Sungaya inexpectata (Sungay "Highland"), three other previously undescribed species exist. Frank H. Hennemann described two of these species in 2023. One of these was that of Bank et al. identified as sister species of Sungaya inexpectata and designated there as Sungaya sp. (Benguet), which was given the name Sungaya ibaloi by Hennemann. The chosen specific name "ibaloi" is dedicated to the Ibaloi people, an indigenous people living in Benguet who, together with others, are referred to as Igorot people and lives in the area of the Cordillera Central.

The first animals of the species were collected in 2013 in Benguet at an altitude of 900 to 1,000 metres (3,000 to 3,300 ft) by the French Thierry Heitzmann, who lives in the Philippines. Of these, a female is deposited as holotype and a male as paratype in the Museum of Natural Sciences in Brussels. Additional paratypes include two females, six males and an egg bred by Bruno Kneubühler in 2015. Another male, a female and an egg from Kneubühler's breeding from 2015 are found as paratypes in Hennemann's specimen collection. In addition, three males from the breeding of his wife Eva Seidel-Hennemann from 2016 are deposited there as paratypes.

== In terraristics ==
From the animals collected by Heitzmann in Benguet in 2013, a breeding stock was established, which was called as Sungaya inexpectata 'Benguet' or Sungaya sp. 'Benguet' until the species was described. It was bred and distributed in Europe for the first time by Kneubühler. The stock is kept and bred pure in origin and has been referred to as Sungaya ibaloi 'Benguet' since the species description by Hennemann in 2023.

Like all previously known representatives of the genus, Sungaya ibaloi is very easy to keep and to breed. It is the second most common Sungaya species in breeding after Sungaya aeta. The foliage of most common forage plants for stick insects is suitable as food, such as that of bramble and other Rosaceae as well as that of hazel, hornbeam and many others. To enable the eggs to be laid, the ground is covered with a slightly moist layer of earth or sand.
