= J. O. Westwood Medal =

The J. O. Westwood Medal is awarded every two years by the Royal Entomological Society (RES).

The criteria for the award are:

The best comprehensive taxonomic work on a group of insects, or, related arthropods (including terrestrial and freshwater hexapods, myriapods, arachnids and their relatives). Typically, this will be a taxonomic revision or monograph. Open to authors from any country who demonstrate the highest standards of descriptive taxonomy in the work nominated.

and the winner is chosen by a panel of senior and international RES Fellows.

The award was inaugurated in 2008, and is named in honour of the entomologist, John O. Westwood. Recipients are awarded a silver gilt medal and £1000.

== Winners ==
Past winners include:

- 2008: Dr Marianne Horak
- 2010: Dr Art Borkent
- 2012: Dr James S. Miller
- 2014: Professor Lee Herman
- 2016: Dr Stanisław Adam Ślipiński & Dr Hermes Escalona
- 2018: Frank H. Hennemann, Oskar V. Conle, Paul D. Brock & Francis Seow-Choen
- 2019: Dr Jason P. W. Hall
- 2020: Professor Brett C. Ratcliffe and Dr Ronald D. Cave
- 2021: Randall T. Schuh & Christiane Weirauch
- 2022: David J. Clarke, Duane McKenna, Rolf Oberprieler, & Ajay Limaye
