= Savitri =

Savitri or Savithri may refer to:

== In Hinduism ==
- Savitri, with all vowels short, a Roman-phonetic spelling of the Rigvedic solar deity Savitr
- Sāvitrī, a name of the Gayatri Mantra dedicated to Savitṛ
- Savitri (goddess), the consort of Brahma, a form of Saraswati
- Name of a manifestation of Prakṛti
- Savitri, a Hindu character from the story of Savitri and Satyavan in the epic Mahabharata

=== Others ===
- Savitri Vrata, a fasting occasion observed by Hindu married women
- Savitri (opera), a 1916 opera by Gustav Holst
- Szávitri, a 1998 opera by Sándor Szokolay
- Savitri (1933 film), a 1933 Telugu film
- Savitri (1937 film), a Hindi film
- Savithiri (1941 film), a Tamil film
- Savithiri (1980 film)
- Savitri (2016 film), a Telugu film
- Savitri: A Legend and a Symbol, an epic poem by Sri Aurobindo published in 1950 and 1951
- Savitri - Ek Prem Kahani, a 2013 Indian television series

== People ==
- Savitri (actress) (1935–1981), Indian actress
- Savitri Devi, born Maximiani Julia Portas, Greek-English-French proponent of Nazism who served as a spy for the Axis Powers in India
- Savitri Hensman, London-based activist and writer
- Savitri Jayasinghe (died 2024), banking executive from Sri Lanka
- Savitri Jindal, Indian businesswoman and politician

== Other ==
- Savitri River, a river in India
- Savitri (TV series) (2013), an Indian supernatural television series
- INS Savitri (P53), an Indian warship

== See also ==
- Sati Savitri (disambiguation)
- Savita (disambiguation)
- Satyavan Savitri (disambiguation)
- Savithri (disambiguation)
