= Savita Oil Technologies Limited =

Indian petrochemical company

- Type: Public
- Traded as: BSE: 524667; NSE: SOTL
- Industry: Oil and Automotive
- Headquarters: Mumbai, Maharashtra, India
- Key people: (Founder); Mr.N K Mehra (Chairman & MD)
- Products: Transformer oil, White Oil, Lubricating Oil, Engine Oil, Renewable Energy
- Number of employees: 500 Plus
- Website: www.savita.com

Savita Oil Technologies Limited (BSE: 524667, NSE: SOTL) (formerly known as Savita Chemical) is an Indian automotive, industrial lubricant and petroleum specialty oils production company with its headquarters at Mumbai, Maharashtra. It has primarily engaged in manufacturing of petroleum specialties such as transformer oils, liquid paraffin and white oils, petroleum jellies, synthetic petroleum sulfonates and other specialties. Savita Oil has been ranked #42 in Fortune Next 500 list under lube oil and lubricants category, by Fortune India. The company is also involved in manufacturing of automotive and industrial lubricants. In 2018, the company relaunched Savsol, a domestic brand of lubricants and engine oils.

== History ==
The company has been listed on Bombay Stock Exchange and National Stock Exchange since 1994.

It operates three manufacturing plants in Western India. Its Lube Oil manufacturing plant situated at Silvassa, is a fully automated manufacturing unit and has been certified for ISO 9001:2015 & ISO 14001:2015.

== Partnership ==
In 2018, Tata Motors signed an agreement with Savita Oil Technologies to manufacture and provide original oils for their passenger vehicle brands.
