= John Hensman =

Revd Canon John Hensman
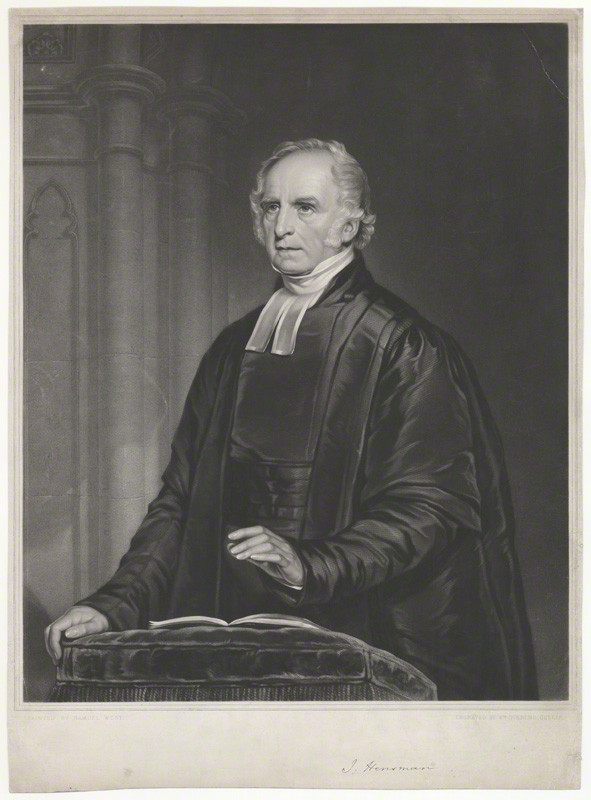
- John Hensman by William Overend Geller, after Samuel West
- Born: 22 September 1780; Bedford
- Died: 23 April 1864 (aged 83); Clifton, Bristol
- Occupation: Clergyman

Revd Canon John Hensman (1780–1864) was a nineteenth century Church of England clergyman, a Fellow of Corpus Christi College, Cambridge, and a prolific church builder.

== Biography ==
Born in Bedford on 22 September 1780, John Hensman was educated at Bedford School and at Corpus Christi College, Cambridge, where he matriculated as an Exhibitioner in February 1797. He graduated as ninth Wrangler at the University of Cambridge in 1801 and was elected as a Fellow of Corpus Christi College, Cambridge. He was ordained in 1803, and was appointed as Curate of Wraxall, Somerset. In 1809 he was appointed as Curate of Clifton, Bristol. He was instrumental in the rebuilding of Clifton parish church, which was consecrated on 12 August 1822. He was then the moving force behind the building of the Church of Holy Trinity, Hotwells, which was consecrated on 10 November 1830. He held the incumbency of the church until 1844, when he was granted the perpetual curacy of Christ Church, Clifton Down, and he oversaw the rebuilding of that church. He was instituted to the living of Clifton, Bristol, in 1847, and oversaw the building of St Paul's Church, Clifton, Bristol, consecrated in 1853, and St Peter’s Church, Clifton, consecrated in 1855.

Revd Hensman was appointed as a Canon of Bristol Cathedral in 1858, and a chapel of ease, known as St James’ Chapel of Ease as well as the Hensman Memorial Church, was consecrated in his honour in 1862. John Latimer states that:

"In March 1859, a number of the inhabitants of Clifton resolved upon the erection of a chapel of ease to Clifton Church, in commemoration of the Rev. J. Hensman's fifty years' labours amongst them. The chapel, which was dedicated to St. James, but is more commonly known as the Hensman Memorial Church, was consecrated by Bishop Thomson, during his brief episcopate, in December 1862, when Mr. Hensman was still incumbent of the parish".

The Revd Canon John Hensman died in Clifton, Bristol, on 23 April 1864 and was buried in Wraxall, Somerset.
