= Henneman =

Henneman is a surname. Notable people with the surname include:

- Aaron Henneman (born 1980), Australian rules footballer
- Brian Henneman, American musician
- Charles Henneman (1866–?), American shot putter
- Ig Henneman (born 1945), Dutch composer
- Mike Henneman (born 1961), American baseball player

== See also ==
- Hennemann
