= Savita =

Savita may refer to:

- Savitr, a Hindu deity associated with motion and the sun
- Savita Ambedkar (1909–2003), Indian social activist and doctor
- Savita Bhabhi, fictional pornographic cartoon character
- Savita Halappanavar, woman who died in Ireland after she was denied an abortion
- Savita Kovind, former First Lady of India, wife of 14th Indian president Ram Nath Kovind
- Savita Punia (born 1990), Indian field hockey player
- Savita Oil Technologies Limited or simply Savita, Indian industrial lubricant manufacturer

== See also ==
- Savitri (disambiguation)
