= Palatinate Museum of Natural History =

Museum in Germany

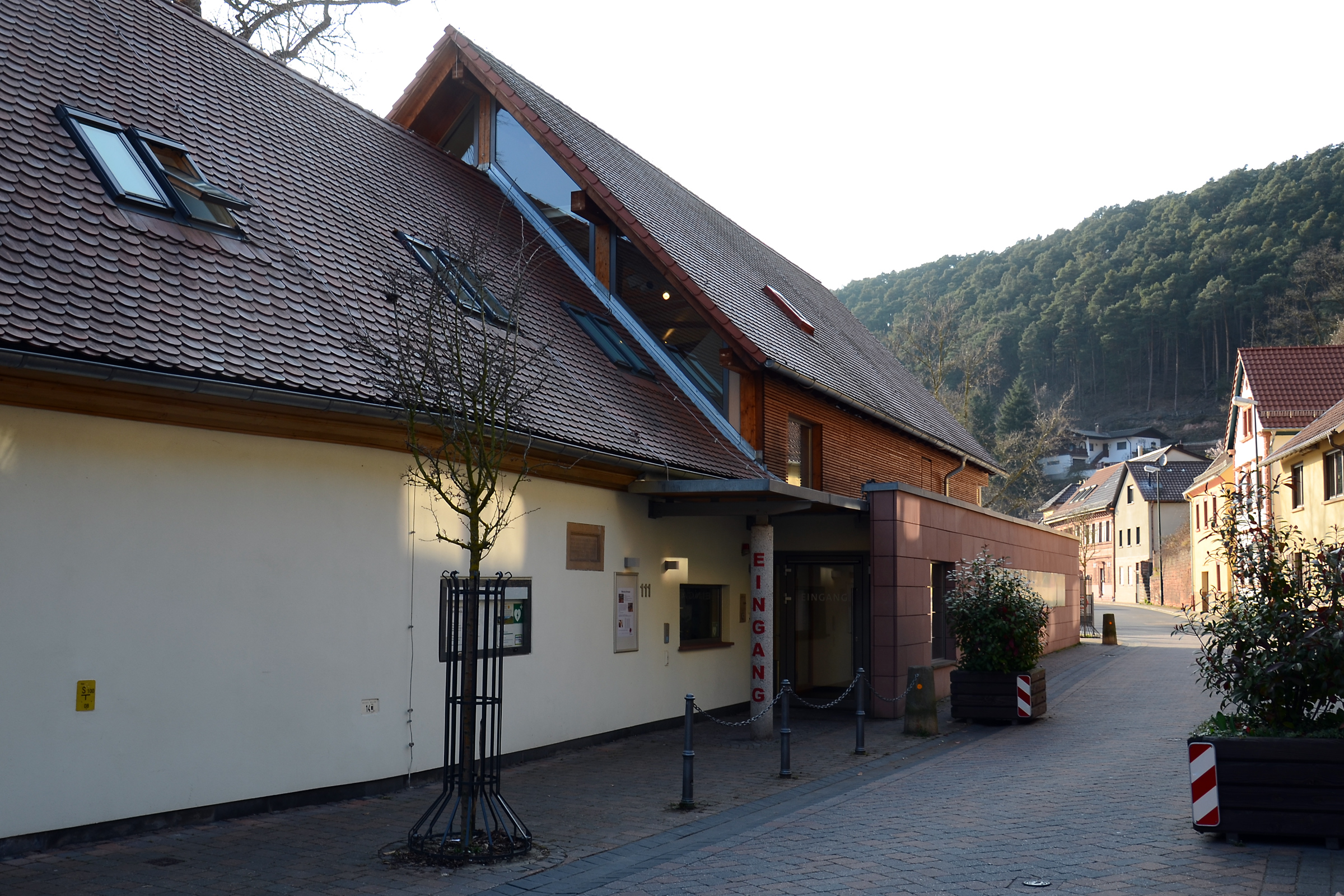
- Location: Germany
- Coordinates: 49°27′41″N 8°08′58″E
- Website: www.pfalzmuseum.de
- Location of Palatinate Museum of Natural History

The Palatinate Museum of Natural History (German: Pfalzmuseum für Naturkunde – Pollichia-Museum) is a natural history museum in the Anterior Palatinate county town of Bad Dürkheim in the German state of Rhineland-Palatinate. There is also a branch of the Palatinate museum, the GEOSCOPE Prehistoric Museum (GEOSKOP Urweltmuseum) at Lichtenberg Castle near the West Palatine county town of Kusel. Both establishments are run by the Palatinate District Association (Bezirksverband Pfalz), the town of Bad Dürkheim and the counties of Bad Dürkheim and Kusel.

== Geography ==
The Palatinate Museum is located in a former mill, the Herzogmühle on the Herzogweiher, a reservoir on the River Isenach in the Bad Dürkheim ward of Grethen.

== Exhibitions and education ==
Since 1981 the museum has exhibited the natural science collection of the Pollichia nature conservation society as well as a permanent exhibition and changing exhibitions with scientific themes. In 2008 there was an expansion: after the renovation of the former mill restaurant and the erection of an extension to the building the new entrance area and rooms for special exhibitions were officially opened on 8 November 2008.

The fields of science covered include astronomy, herpetology (reptiles), ornithology and mineralogy. There is a comprehensive range of educational packages for visiting groups and school classes. Next to the museum shop there is a palaeontological workshop and geological reference library. Amongst its best known exhibits is the Krähenberg meteorite which impacted on the Sickingen Heights in 1869.

== Prehistoric museum ==
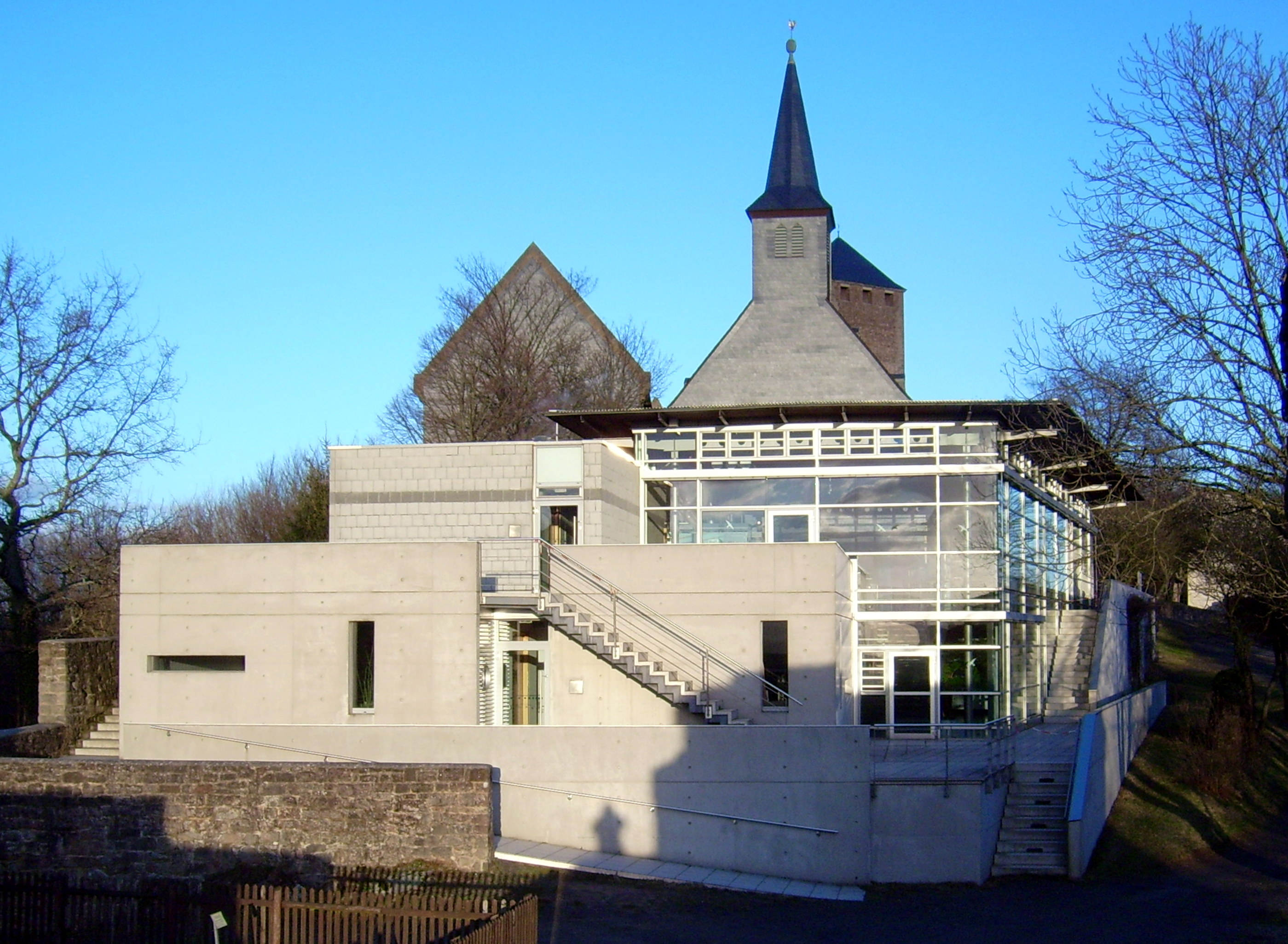
Rear of the GEOSCOPE Prehistoric Museum

In 1998 the GEOSCOPE Prehistoric Museum was opened at Lichtenberg Castle near Kusel. With a floor area of 400 square metres, the museum offers an insight into the Rotliegendes period about 290 million years ago. At that time the southern and northern continental plates collided in this region, producing the Variscan mountains, and a moist-warm tropical climate prevailed. Another major subject in the exhibition area is mining in the North Palatine Uplands with special coverage of the living and working conditions of the miners. Mineral deposits, including copper and mercury-bearing ores, have been mined here from Celtic and Roman times right up to the start of the 20th century.
