= Savitri Hensman =

Activist and writer

- Born: Sri Lanka
- Education: University College London
- Known for: LGBT activism Writing

Savitri "Savi" Hensman is an activist and writer based in the United Kingdom. She was one of the founders of London's Black Lesbian and Gay Centre.

== Early life and education ==
Hensman was born in Sri Lanka but moved to the United Kingdom at the age of two, growing up in Hackney. She studied chemical engineering at University College London, graduating in 1982. However, she was later unable to find any work in chemical engineering, so instead, joined a lab as a research assistant.

== Research and career ==
Hensman helped to launch the London's Black Lesbian and Gay Centre in 1985. At the time, the centre was supported by the Greater London Council and housed in an annex of Tottenham Town Hall. In the late 1980s, Hensman joined the Haringey Council's Lesbian and Gay Sub-Committee and was involved with the campaign against Section 28. As well as this, Hensman was involved in the Positive Images group and Haringey Black Action (late 1890s). Hensman worked for many years and is currently an involvement coordinator in health research. As a member of the Christian Church, Hensman campaigns for a more inclusive community, writing on the inclusion of lesbian, gay, bisexual and transgender people in religious communities. In October 2018, she wrote an LGBT briefing paper that was presented to the Archbishop of Canterbury.

Hensman is a regular contributor to Ekklesia, who published her first book in 2015. She has also written for The Guardian, as well as writing poetry.

In 2016, Hensman joined King's College London as the Patient and Public Involvement (PPI) Coordinator for the Collaboration for Leadership in Applied Health Research and Care, South London (CLAHRC). She worked with researchers, service users, carers and communities in order to accumulate research that reflected the views and priorities of local people.

In 2019, Hensman was featured in the University College London (UCL) Queer Tapestry, a project which celebrated the history of UCL's LGBTQ+ community. The tapestry was created by Robert (Bob) Mills, a professor of history of art who leads the LGBTQ+ network.

=== Books ===
- Hensman, Savitri and Moriarty, Sarah (1979) Flood at the door
- Hensman, Savitri (2015). Sexuality, Struggle and Saintliness: Same-Sex Love and the Church. Ekklesia. ISBN 978-0993294204.

=== Articles ===
- Hensman, Savitri (15 July 2019) Marriage: a leap for methodists, a shuffle for the Church of England
- Hensman, Savitri (14 September 2015) Remembering Ken Leech
- Hensman, Savitri (1 July 2015) Varied Reactions as the Episcopal Church permits same-sex couples to marry
- Hensman, Savitri (4 April 2015)Jesus and the tomb-dweller: Lifting Death's shadow
- Hensman, Savitri (2 March 2015) Did God make snails? Diversity in creation
- Hensman, Savitri (25 January 2015) Bishops and church collegiality in a postmodern setting
- Hensman, Savitri (20 December 2014) How do we negotiate the global church sexuality conflict?
- Hensman, Savitri (3 November 2014) The 'Baby P' case and confession: tackling child protection failings
- Hensman, Savitri (22 October 2014) Alter Synod, the Catholic Debate on sexuality continues
- Hensman, Savitri (2 September 2014) Same-sex love, self-denial and the cross
- Hensman, Savitri (8 July 2014) Church, worldly values, the 'common good' and war
- Hensman, Savitri (17 April 2014) The Washing of feet: a call to love and a challenge to gender and privilege
- Hensman, Savitri (17 February 2014) Love, grace and the Bishops' pastoral guidance
- Hensman, Savitri (11 December 2013) Sexuality, harm and the language of love
- Hensman, Savitri (17 June 2013) Worship, song and its impact on Christian Imagination
- Hensman, Savitri (3 June 2013) Parliament's equal marriage debates reveal churches divided
- Hensman, Savitri (13 May 2013) Caribbean Anglican leaders: homophobia, debating sexuality, upholding human rights
- Hensman, Savitri (9 April 2013) From Thatcher to Cameron: a cruel legacy
- Hensman, Savitri (29 March 2013) Buying Enmity: the language of the cross
- Hensman, Savitri (23 March 2013) Sacrifice or change? The NHS and health after Mid Staffs
- Hensman, Savitri (5 February 2013) Marriage, Union or Contract? The flawed ResPublica case against equality
- Hensman, Savitri (19 January 2013) Sri Lanka: farewell to the rule of law?
- Hensman, Savitri (24 December 2012) The Pope, 'the Family' and Christmas
- Hensman, Savitri (13 December 2012) Equal marriage: churches sharing or burying good news?
- Hensman, Savitri (27 November 2012) Women Bishops: How to move forward?
- Hensman, Savitri (16 November 2012) Amid Sri Lanka's poor: the life and death of Michael Rodrigo
- Hensman, Savitri (9 November 2012) Justin Welby: Archbishop amidst fallen idols
- Hensman, Savitri (22 October 2012) Trustworthy leaders or slaughterhouse shepherds?
- Hensman, Savitri (9 October 2012) Anglicans, archbishops and presidential confusions
