= Frank H. Hennemann =

German biologist

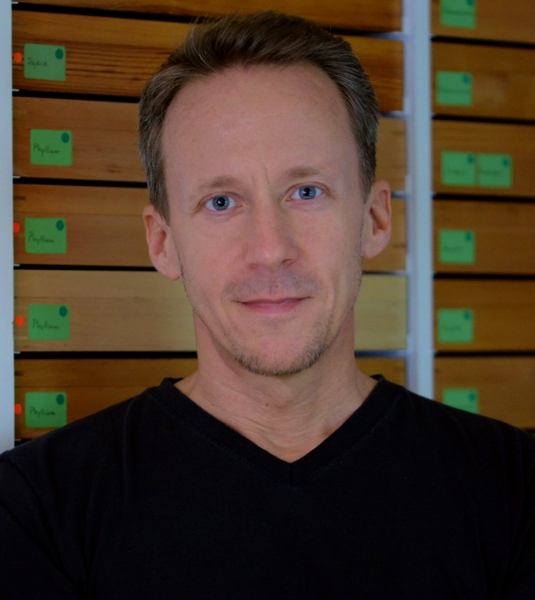
- Frank H. Hennemann (in January 2024)
- Born: Frank H. Hennemann; 1 July 1978 (age 48); Ludwigshafen, Rhineland-Palatinate, Germany
- Awards: Sponsorship award of the Munich Entomological Society (2009); Editor’s Choice Award of the Annals of the Entomological Society of America (2010); Ian Abercrombie Award of the Phasmid Study Group (2017); J. O. Westwood Medal (2018)
- Scientific career
- Fields: Zoology; Biogeography
- Workplaces: Bavarian State Collection of Zoology; Montreal Insectarium
- Author abbrev. (zoology): Hennemann

Frank H. Hennemann (born 1 July 1978 in Ludwigshafen) is a German entomologist and taxonomist who works in the field of biodiversity research on the systematics and biogeography of stick insects (Phasmatodea).

== Biography ==
Hennemann grew up in Bad Dürkheim and Freinsheim on the edge of the Palatinate Forest-North Vosges Biosphere Reserve. Since his childhood, he has been interested in animals, especially the arthropods, amphibians and reptiles in his native environment. He first bred stick insects at the age of eleven with Extatosoma tiaratum and Haplopus bicuspidatus, which awakened his enthusiasm and fascination for these insects and their breeding. In 1990, for example, he acquired additional species of stick insects at a meeting of phasmid friends at the Palatinate Museum of Natural History in Bad Dürkheim, so that he soon had an entire room full of breeding cages and terrariums. In addition to keeping and breeding stick insects, he soon became interested in their taxonomy, as well as the differentiation, characterization and systematization of the different species and genera. As the number of species increased, his interest in collecting insects was awakened, which formed the basis for building his extensive, constantly growing collection of specimens.

A trip to Singapore in 1990 with his father, who worked there, inspired Hennemann for the tropics, so that in the following years he undertook further trips to Malaysia, Borneo, Indonesia and Sri Lanka and in 1991 he saw the first stick insects in their natural habitats on the Malay Peninsula could collect. After graduating from high school, he began studying biology and teacher at the Johannes Gutenberg University Mainz and the Technical University of Kaiserslautern, as well as training to become an automobile salesperson. From 2001 onwards, with his long-time friend Oskar V. Conle, he undertook collecting trips and expeditions to Brazil, Peru, Ecuador, French Guiana, Costa Rica and Panama, as well as to Texas, to obtain stick insects for biodiversity studies and to observe them in their habitats. One of these trips was a multi-week expedition to the biological research station Panguana in the lowland rainforest of Peru in 2004, in which he took part together with employees of the Bavarian State Collection of Zoology. Since 1997, he and Conle have also made numerous trips to natural history museums in Europe and the USA to study the collections there and photograph type specimens for taxonomic studies. With the numerous photos he has taken since then, he supports the online database Phasmida Species File.

== Research fields and publications ==
Hennemann has been a member of the Phasmid Study Group since 1990 and wrote the first breeding instructions in the “Phasmid Studies” published by it in 1992. The first publication on the taxonomy of stick insects, with the description of a new species, appeared in 1995. The first description of a genus and a new species belonging to it followed in 1996. Both are still valid today. Since then, over 80 further publications have followed, dealing not only with taxonomy but also with the biogeography of stick insects in the Oriental and Neotropical realm. Since 2005, Hennemann, together with Conle and other entomologist friends, has been publishing the series “Studies on Neotropical Phasmatodea”, in which 25 papers have been published so far (as of the end of 2023). In 2011, together with Conle and Yeisson Gutiérrez, he published the book “The Stick Insects of Colombia”, in which four genera and 74 new species from Colombia that were new to science were described. His work on Oriental stick insects primarily deals with the fauna of Wallacea (particularly Sulawesi) and the Philippines. For his revision of the subfamily Heteropteryginae, published in 2016 together with Conle, Paul D. Brock and Francis Seow-Choen, he received the J. O. Westwood Medal of the Royal Entomological Society in 2018, a medal of honor for the best taxonomic work of the year, which he received together with his co-authors that same year at the European Congress of Entomology in Naples. In 2000, Conle and Hennemann launched the website www.Phasmatodea.com, which serves as an information and knowledge portal for anyone interested in stick insects. Hennemann has been a volunteer research assistant at the Bavarian State Collection of Zoology since 2004 and a freelance research assistant at the Montreal Insectarium since 2020.

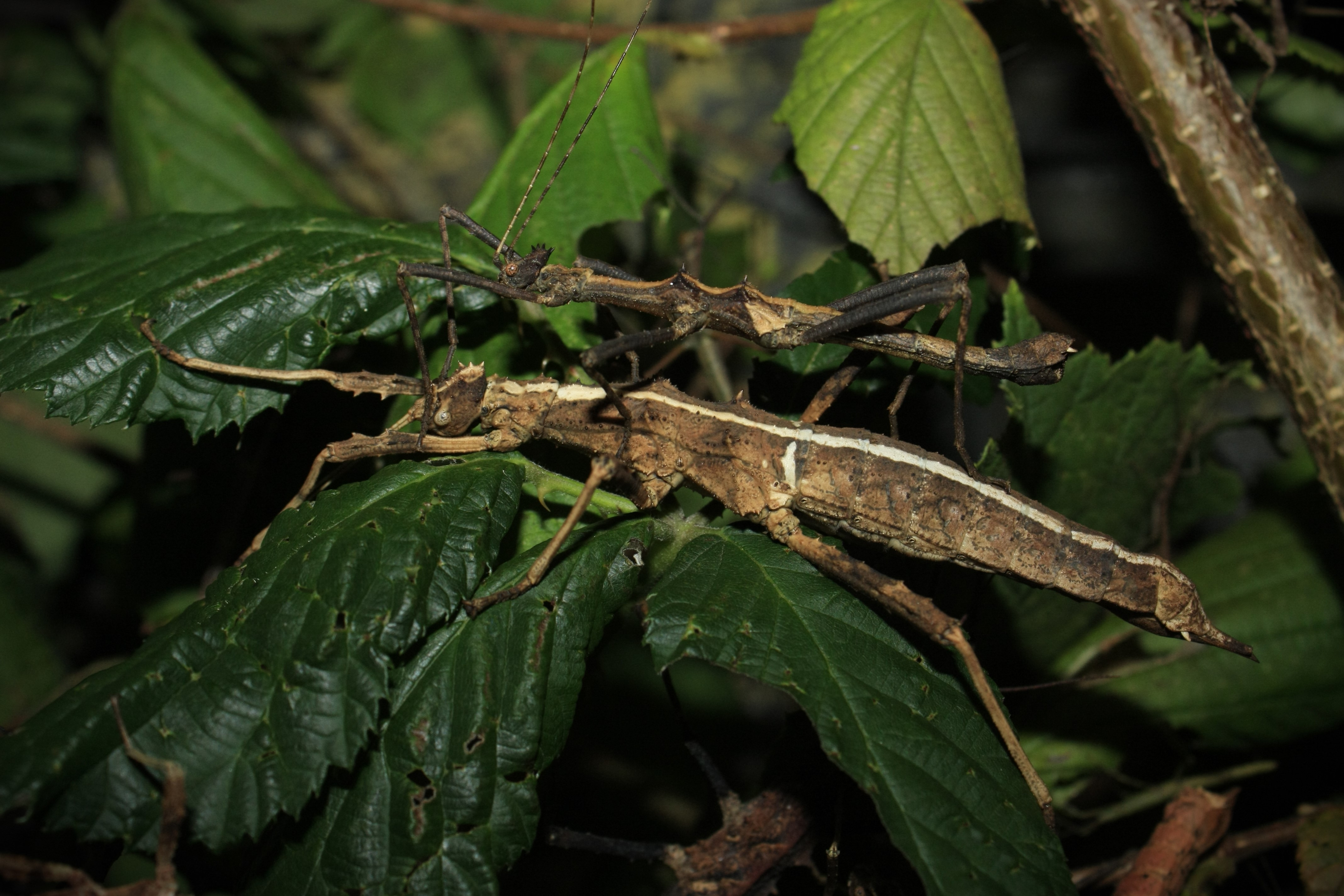
Sungaya aeta, one of the most popular stick insects, was described by Frank Hennemann in 2023

Hennemann has so far (as of the end of 2023) described one subfamily, four tribes, 37 genera, 274 species and 9 subspecies. Among the stick insects he discovered or described, there are several species that are very common among breeders in Europe, such as Peruphasma schultei from Peru, Myronides glaucus from Peleng, Oreophoetes topoense from Ecuador, Haaniella gorochovi from Vietnam, and the walking leaves Phyllium philippinicum and Phyllium ericoriai from the Philippines or the Obriminae Trachyaretaon bresseeli, Sungaya aeta and Sungaya ibaloi, which also come from there.

== Awards ==
In addition to the J. O. Westwood Medal, Hennemann and Conle received the Munich Entomological Society's sponsorship award in March 2009 and the Editor's Choice Award from the Annals of the Entomological Society of America in December 2010. He was awarded the Ian Abercrombie Award by the Phasmid Study Group in 2017.

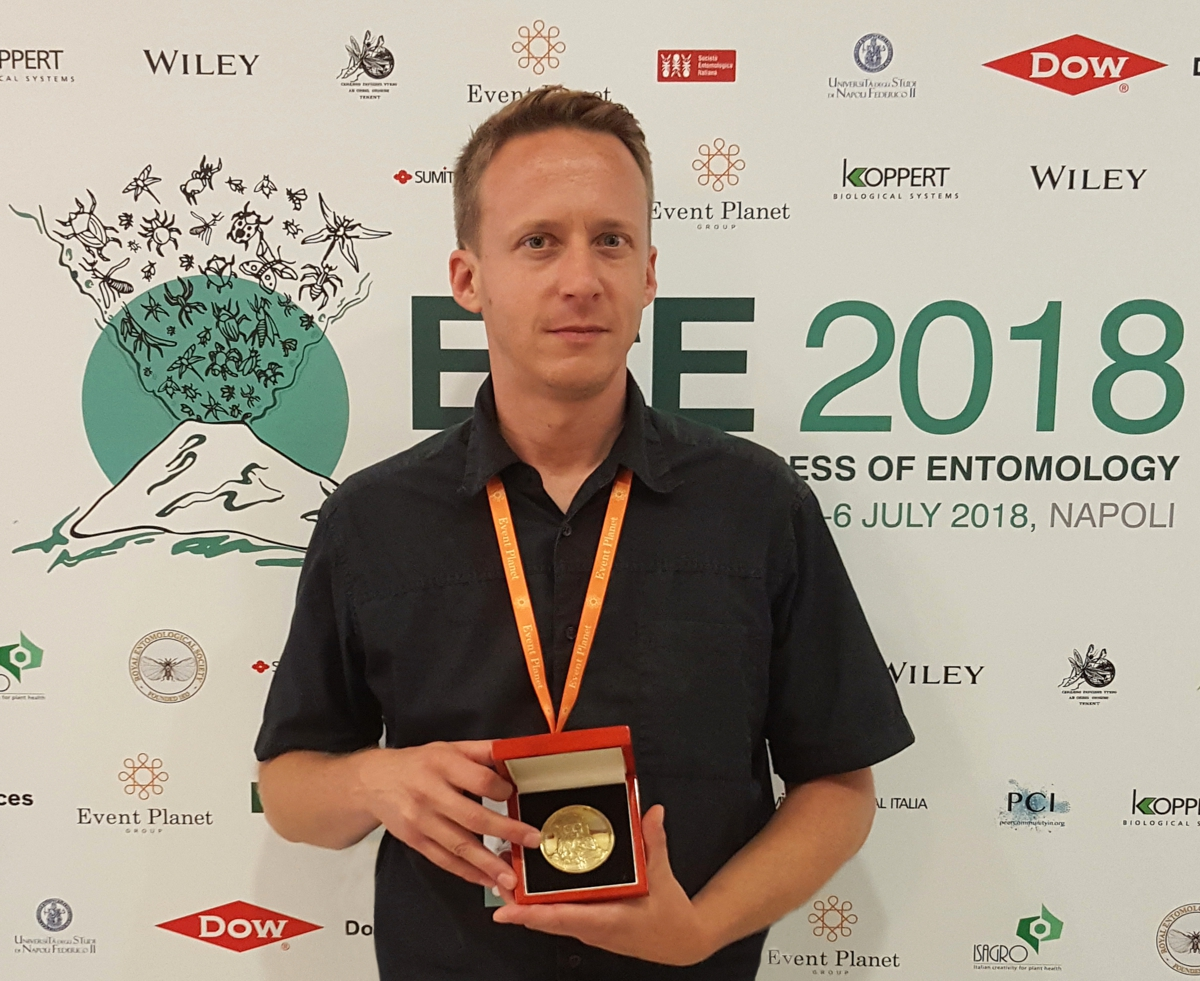
Hennemann with the Westwood-Medal at the European Congress of Entomology in Naples 2018

== Dedication names ==
The genus Hennemannia Seow-Choen, 2016 as well as the following stick insect species are named after Frank Hennemann:

- Oreophoetophasma hennemanni Zompro, 2002
- Hennobrimus hennemanni Conle, 2006 (now synonym of Mearnsiana bullosa)
- Calvisia hennemanni Seow-Choen, 2016
- Diapherodes hennemanni Bellanger, Jourdan, Lelong & Penet, 2021
