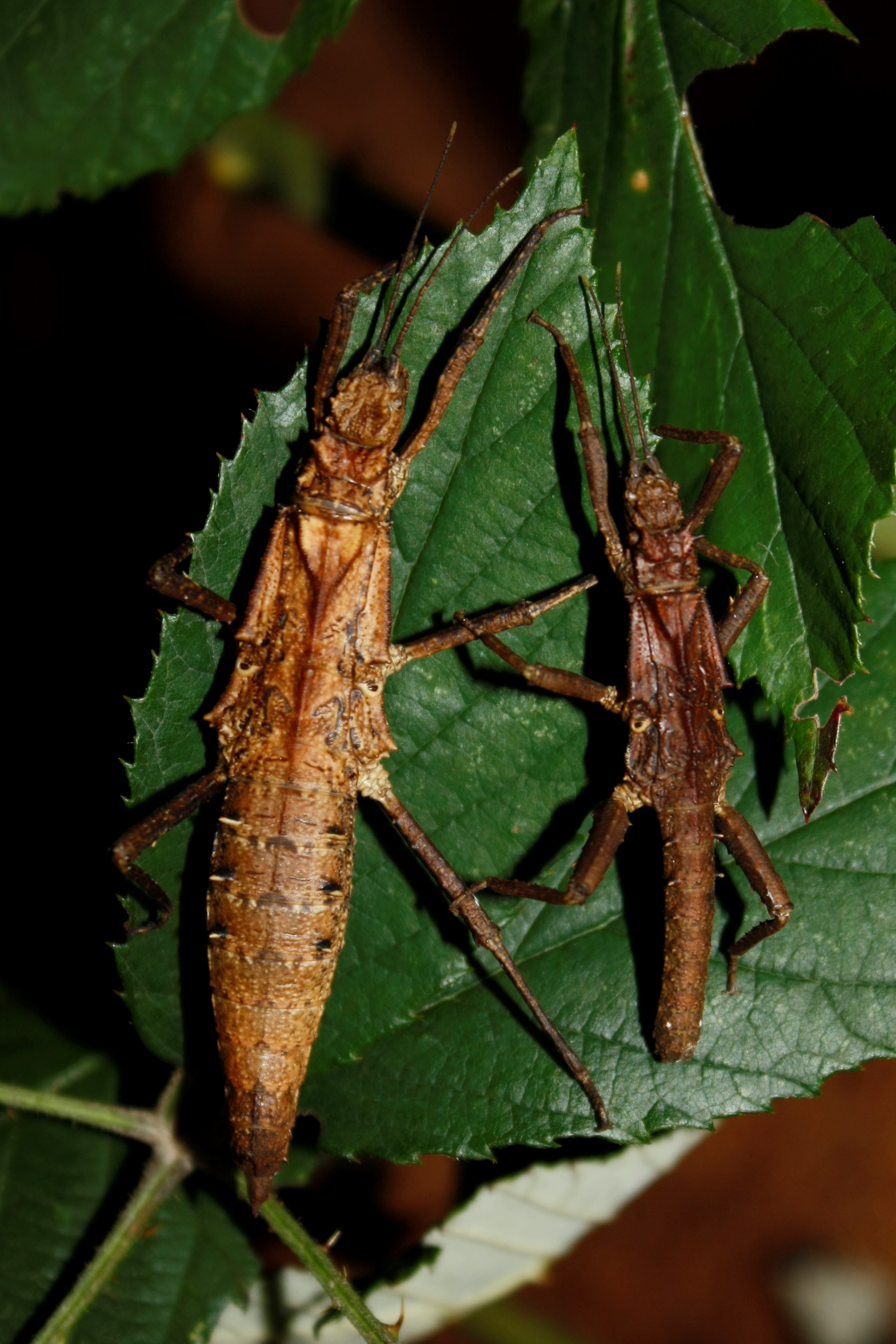
- Tisamenus deplanatus 'Ilocos', pair

Scientific classification
- Kingdom: Animalia
- Phylum: Arthropoda
- Class: Insecta
- Order: Phasmatodea
- Family: Heteropterygidae
- Subfamily: Obriminae
- Tribe: Obrimini
- Genus: Tisamenus
- Species: T. deplanatus

Binomial name
- Tisamenus deplanatus (Westwood, 1848)

Synonyms
- Phasma (Pachymorpha) deplanatum Westwood, 1848; Acanthoderus deplanatus (Westwood, 1848); Hoploclonia deplanata (Westwood, 1848); Tisamenus deplanata (Westwood, 1848)

= Tisamenus deplanatus =

Species of stick insect

Tisamenus deplanatus is a stick insect species native to the north of the Philippine island of Luzon. A relatively rarely used common name for the species is flat stick insect, which in turn refers to the species name "deplanatus" what means something like "flattened".

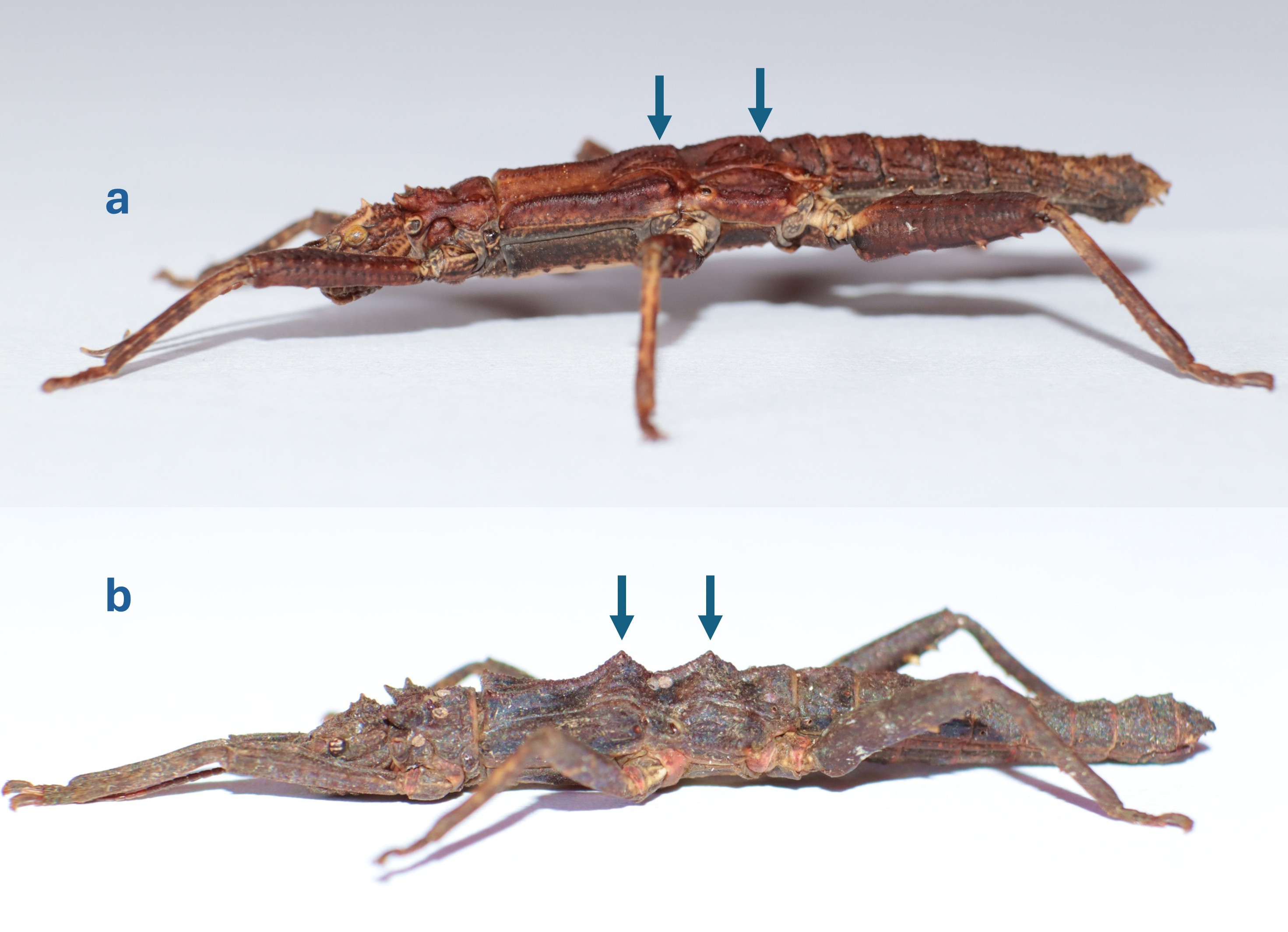
Males of a) Tisamenus cervicornis with flat topsite and b) Tisamenus deplanatus with two humps on the posterior edges of Meso- and Metanotum

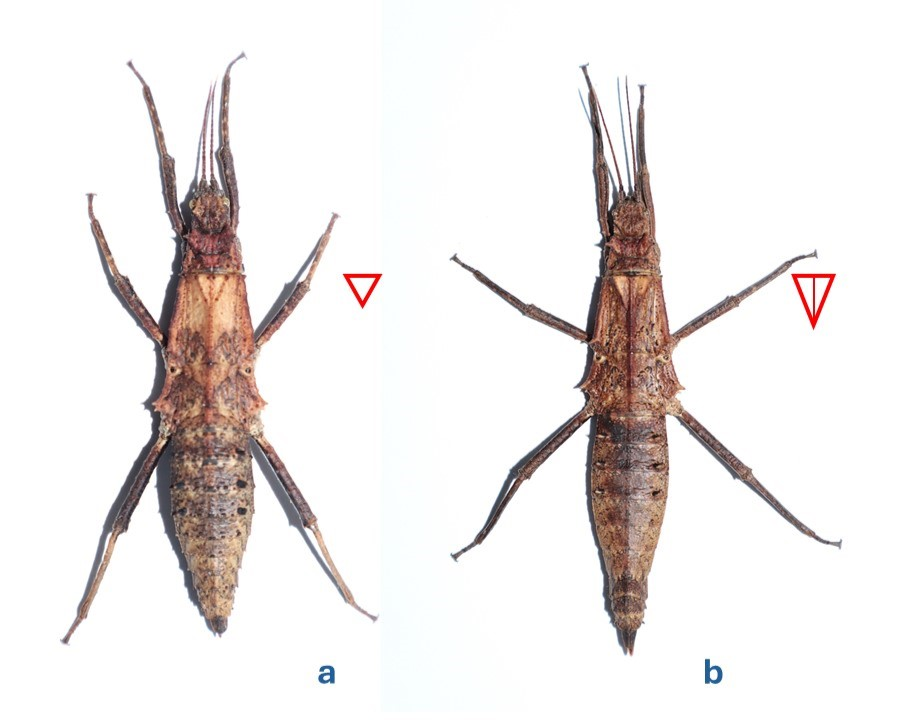
Females of a) Tisamenus cervicornis and b) Tisamenus deplanatus with comparison of the shape and size of the triangles on the mesonotum

== Description ==
Tisamenus deplanatus is a relatively unspined Tisamenus species. The males are 38 to 43 millimetres (1.5 to 1.7 in), the wider females about 56 to 67 millimetres (2.2 to 2.6 in) long. On the flat head there is a distinct pair of supra orbital spines, which either consist of three interconnected tubercles or of a larger pair of tubercles with surrounding tubercles. On the right and left of the pronotum there are two closely spaced spines. On the relatively short mesothorax, which widens in a strongly trapezoidal shape towards the rear, there is the triangle formed by raised edges, which is typical of Tisamenus species. The base of this triangle is attached to the front edge of the mesonotum and is strongly raised. On the triangle is a flat, central longitudinal ridge, which extends somewhat higher along the rest of the mesonotum and the entire metanotum, extending from the posterior tip. In females of Tisamenus deplanatus, the triangle is longer than wide, forming an isosceles triangle. On the triangle there is a flat, central longitudinal ridge, which extends in extension of the posterior tip somewhat higher over the rest of the mesonotum and the entire metanotum. This feature makes them easy to distinguish from females of the similar, somewhat broader Tisamenus cervicornis, in which this triangle is wider than long, forming a roughly equilateral triangle. On the lateral edges of the thorax of Tisamenus deplanatus is only a pair of supra coxal spines formed as double spines at the widest point on the posterior edge of the metanotum. On the first three segments of the abdomen there are clear, on the fourth a barely visible pair of spines. The formation and arrangement of the spines is relatively the same in both sexes. In the case of the slimmer males, the relatively short and almost cylindrical abdomen is particularly noticeable. The center of the posterior margins of the meso- and metanotum is clearly curved, forming clearly visible elevations from the side. In the males of the similar Tisamenus cervicornis, these are at most slightly rounded. The abdomen of the females is almost as wide at the base as the metathorax at its widest point and tapers evenly to the tip of the secondary ovipositor.

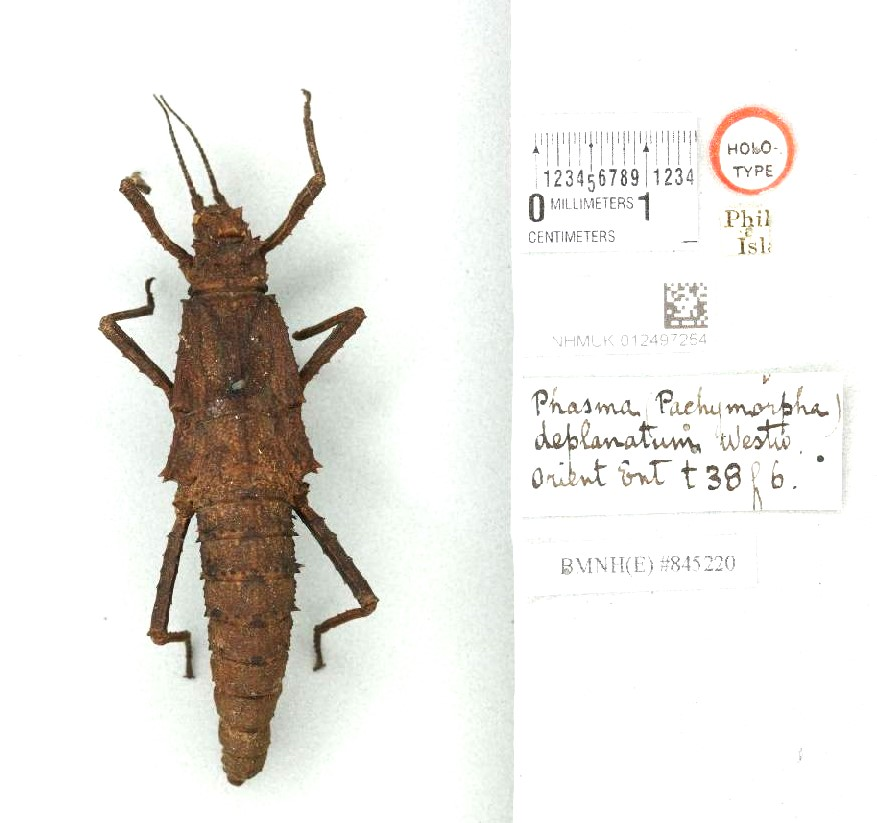
holotype from the Natural History Museum, London

== Taxonomy ==
In 1845 John Obadiah Westwood first described the species as Phasma (Pachymorpha) deplanatum and transferred it to the genus Acanthoderus in 1859. A female is deposited as holotype in the Natural History Museum, London. The species name "deplanatum" comes from Latin and means something like "flattened". However, only the females are comparatively flattened, while the species description unknown males exhibit two characteristic humps in the middle of the posterior margins of the mesonotum and metanotum. In 1875 Carl Stål transferred the species as Tisamenus deplanatus to the genus he established Tisamenus. In 1939, James Abram Garfield Rehn and his son John William Holman Rehn synonymized the genus Tisamenus with the genus Hoploclonia, whereby the species was listed as Hoploclonia deplanata. A female described and depicted by them as a representative of this species, which is deposited in the National Museum of Natural History in Washington, D.C., was later found to be a representative of Tisamenus cervicornis. At the same time Rehn and Rehn divided the genus Hoploclonia into different groups according to morphological aspects. In the so-called Deplanata group, they placed with Hoploclonia deplanata, Hoploclonia cervicornis (today Tisamenus cervicornis), Hoploclonia armadillo (today Tisamenus armadillo), Hoploclonia spadix (today Tisamenus spadix), Hoploclonia tagalog (today Tisamenus tagalog) and Hoploclonia fratercula (today synonymous with Tisamenus cervicornis), relatively unspined species, with a flat upper surface, which except for the supra coxal spines on the edges of the thorax show almost no spines, but at most teeth. In 2004 the Filipino species were transferred back to the genus Tisamenus and only those occurring on Borneo were left in the genus Hoploclonia, the species was called Tisamenus deplanata. In 2018 the ending of the species name was changed and since then the species is again referred to as Tisamenus deplanatus as in 1875 by Stål. The formal description of the males and the eggs was made by Frank H. Hennemann in 2025.

Sarah Bank et al. included, among other samples, representatives of two very similar, cultivated stocks or species of the genus in their molecular genetic studies published in 2021. One of these originated from the Pocdol Mountains and was initially referred to as Tisamenus deplanatus. The representatives of this stock were later identified as Tisamenus cervicornis. Similar individuals were later introduced from Ilocos. They were temporarily referred to as Tisamenus fratercula and later proved to be the true Tisamenus deplanatus. In the meantime, there was a brief debate about whether the two stocks were conspecific. The studies by Bank et al. showed that they are not conspecific, meaning they belong to different species. Furthermore, Tisamenus deplanatus and Tisamenus cervicornis turned out to be not as closely related as Rehn and Rehn had assumed in their 1939 group classification.

== Distribution area ==
Only the islands of the Philippines are mentioned as the location of the female holotype. The previously known distribution area includes the north of the island of Luzon. The breeding stock, currently kept in Europe, comes from the Ilocos region, more precisely from the province of Ilocos Norte. The female examined by Rehn and Rehn in 1939 comes from Surigao on the island of Mindanao, but was assigned to Tisamenus cervicornis by Hennemann in 2025.

== In captivity ==
A stock found in the terrariums of enthusiasts goes back to animals that Thierry Heitzmann collected in the Ilocos region in 2014. They were initially named Tisamenus sp. 'Ilocos' after their place of discovery and were given the PSG number 391 by the Phasmid Study Group. After the species was temporarily identified as Tisamenus fratercula, Hennemann identified it as the true Tisamenus deplanatus when working on the genus. At the same time, he clarified that all publications on the keeping and breeding of a breeding stock that has been circulating since 2012 under the name Tisamenus deplanatus 'Pocdol' and the PSG number 399 refers to the similar Tisamenus cervicornis. Until the specimens from Ilocos were discovered, the males of the species were unknown. The breeding strain designated Tisamenus deplanatus 'Ilocos' is very uncomplicated to keep and breed. The leaves of bramble and other Rosaceae, as well as hazel and other foodplants are eaten.

== Gallery ==
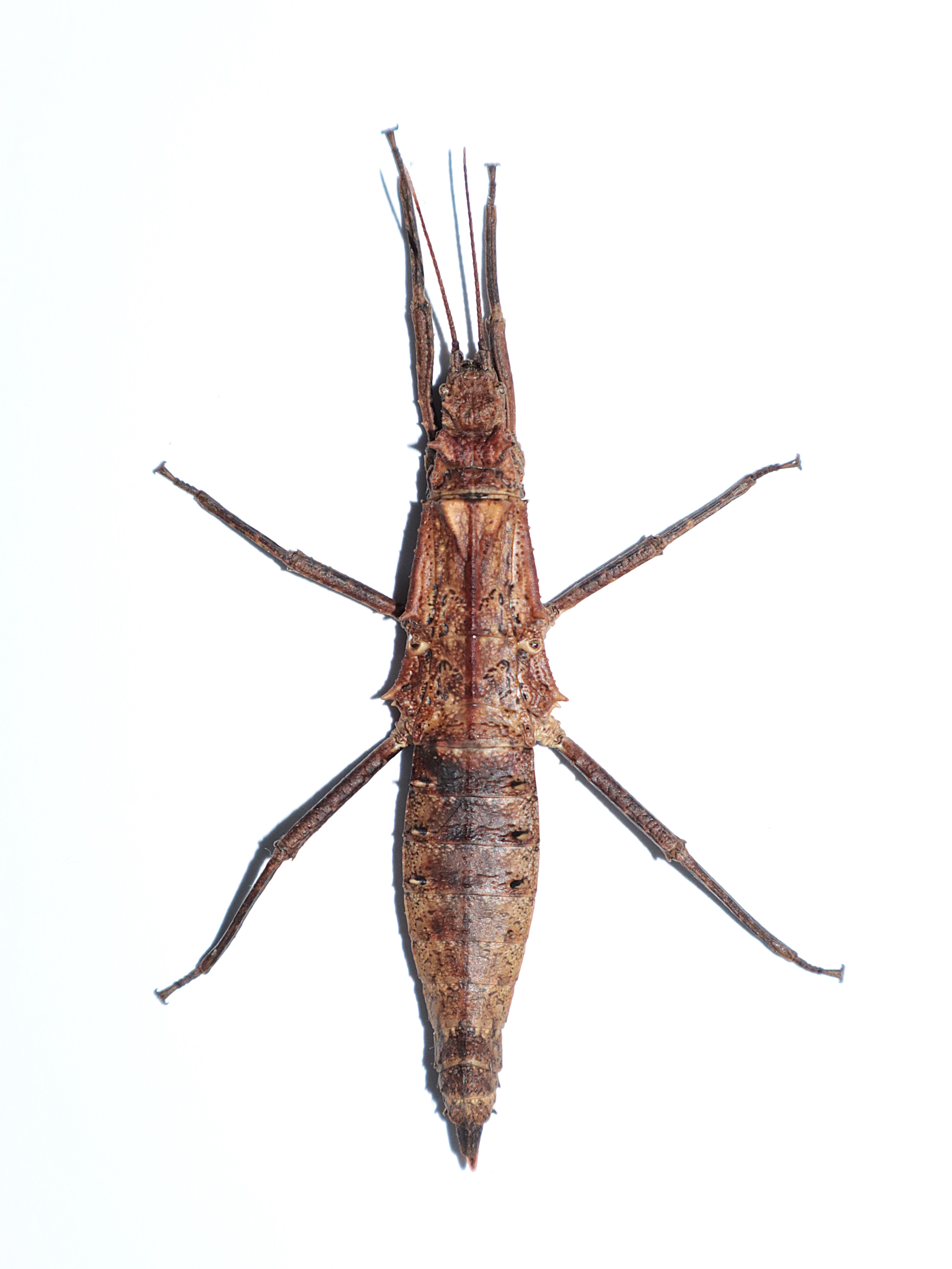
Female from Ilocos in dorsal view

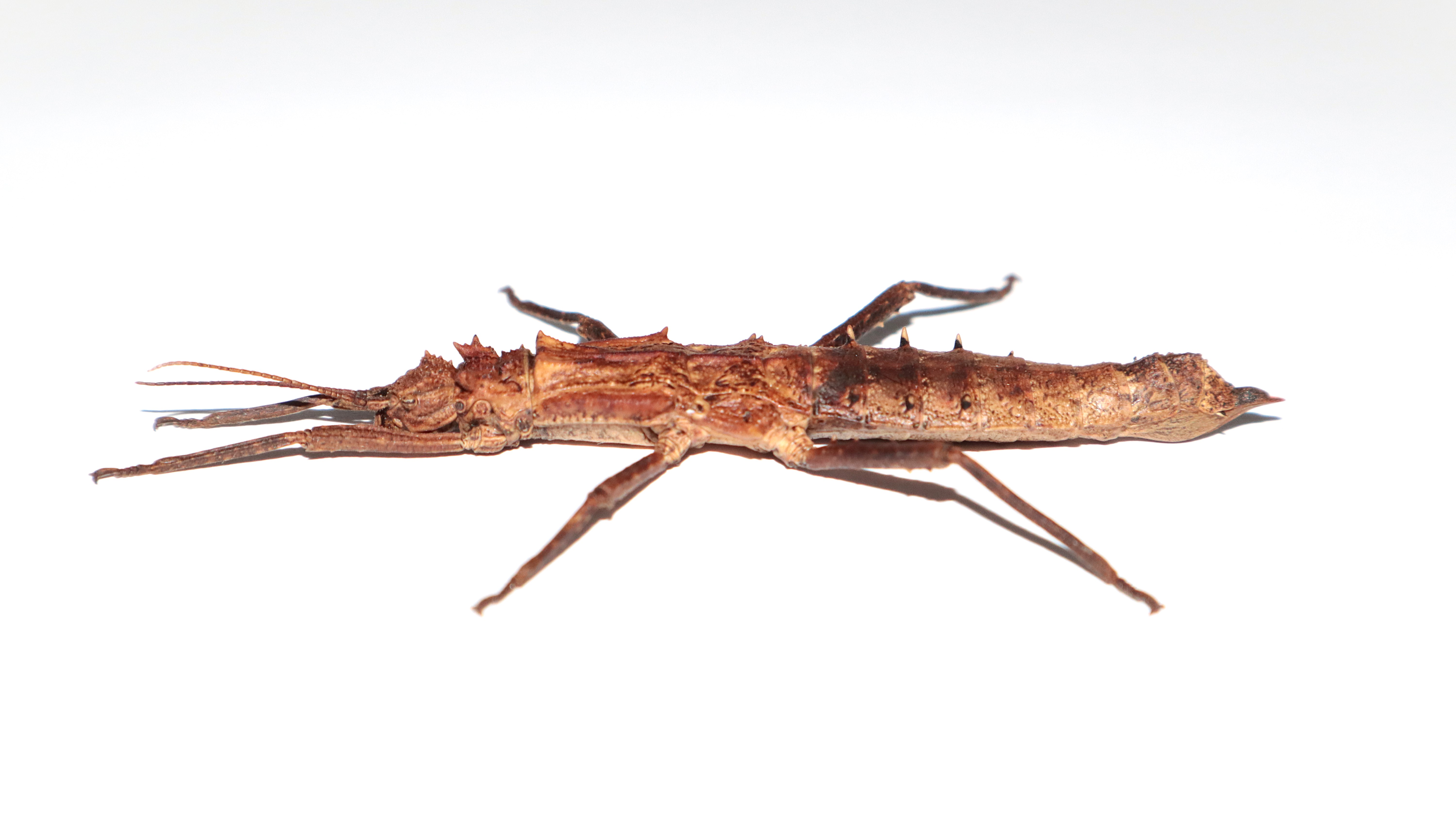
Female from Ilocos in lateral view
