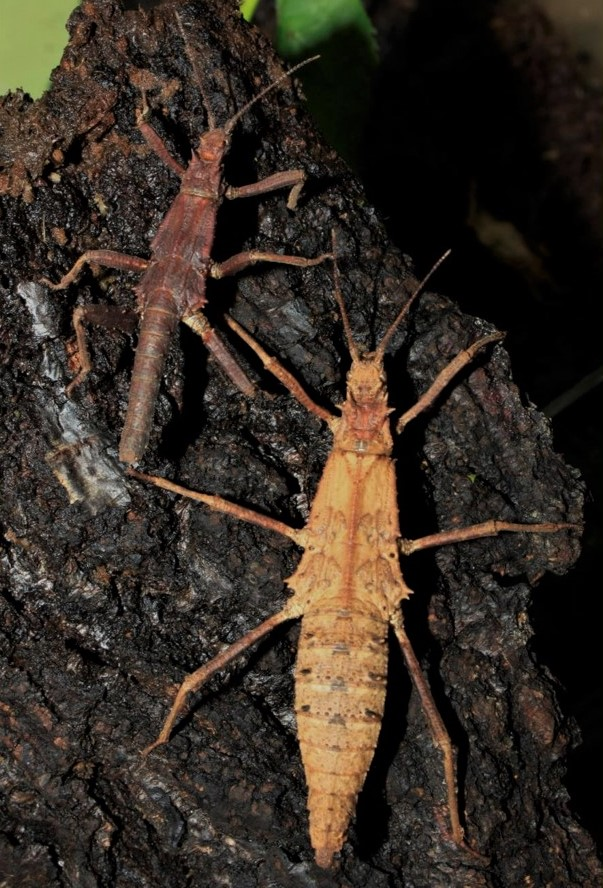
- Tisamenus cervicornis 'Pocdol', left male, right female

Scientific classification
- Kingdom: Animalia
- Phylum: Arthropoda
- Clade: Pancrustacea
- Class: Insecta
- Order: Phasmatodea
- Family: Heteropterygidae
- Subfamily: Obriminae
- Tribe: Obrimini
- Genus: Tisamenus
- Species: T. cervicornis

Binomial name
- Tisamenus cervicornis Bolívar, 1890

Synonyms
- Hoploclonia cervicornis (Bolívar, 1890); Hoploclonia fratercula Rehn, J.A.G. & Rehn, J.W.H., 1939; Tisamenus fratercula (Rehn, J.A.G. & Rehn, J.W.H., 1939)

= Tisamenus cervicornis =

Species of stick insect

Tisamenus cervicornis is a stick insect species (Phasmatodea), in the family of the Heteropterygidae endemic to the Philippine islands Luzon, Samar and Bohol.

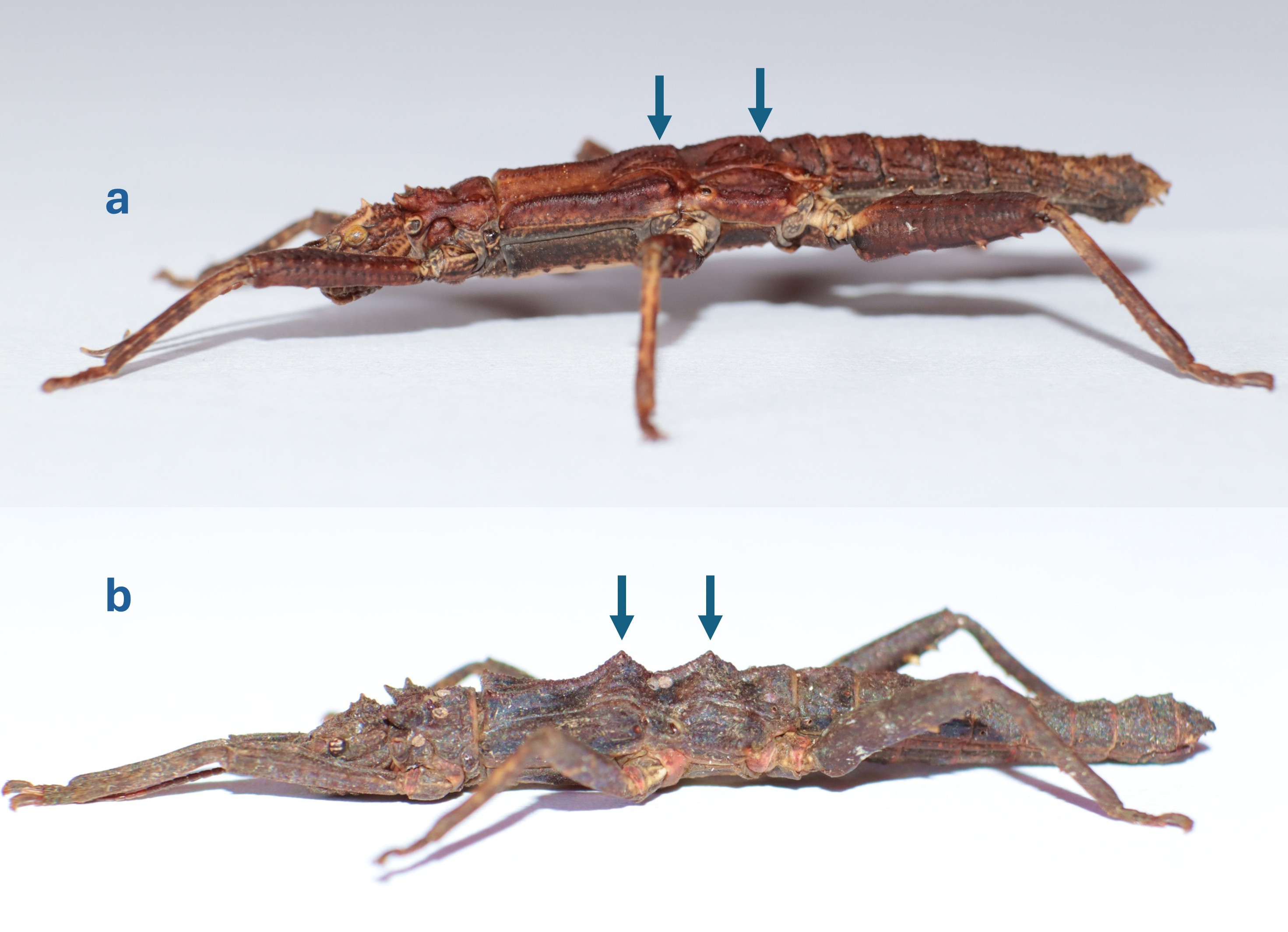
Male of a) Tisamenus cervicornis with flat topsite and b) Tisamenus deplanatus with two humps on the posterior edges of Meso- and Metanotum

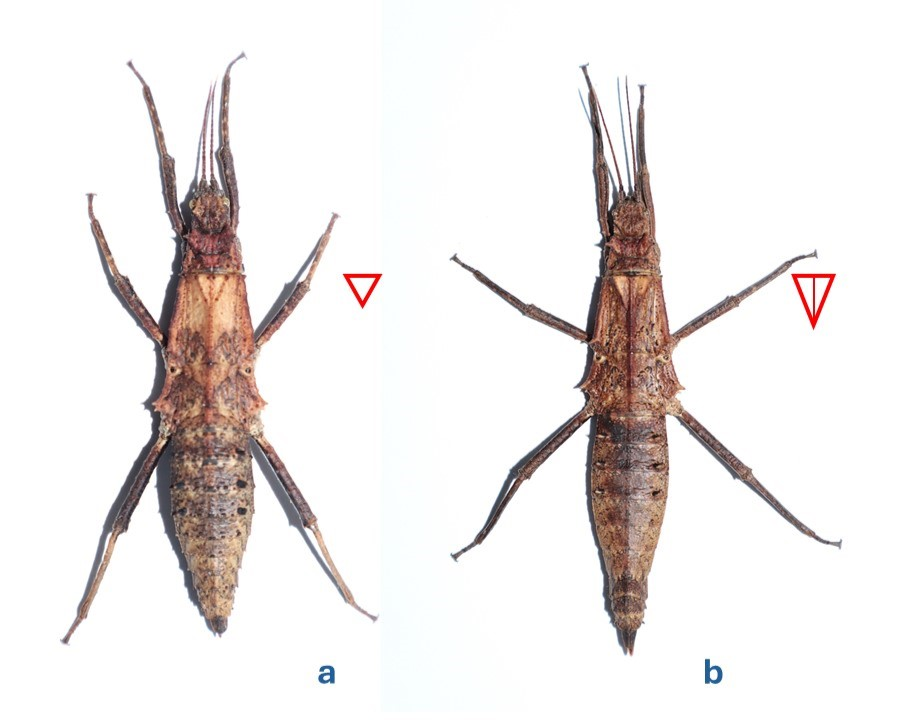
Females of a) Tisamenus cervicornis and b) Tisamenus deplanatus with comparison of the shape and size of the triangles on the mesonotum

== Description ==
Tisamenus cervicornis is a medium-sized Tisamenus species. It has multitoothed postorbital crests on the head. Their second tooth is the largest. Behind the ridges sits a pair of conical tubercles. These features distinguish them from the similar Tisamenus armadillo and Tisamenus spadix. On the pronotum there are two strongly compressed, clearly bidentate combs that point obliquely backwards. The genus-typical triangle on the mesonotum is flatly concave as in Tisamenus spadix. In males it is longer than wide and reaches the middle of the mesonotum. Unlike Tisamenus tagalog, in which it is only slightly longer than wide and does not reach the middle of the mesonotum. In females of Tisamenus cervicornis, the triangle is very small overall, forming a roughly equilateral triangle and reaching only one-third the length of the mesonotum. This feature makes the females easily distinguishable from those of the similar, only slightly slimmer Tisamenus deplanatus, in which this triangle is longer than it is wide, forming a more isosceles triangle that reaches the middle of the mesonotum. The mesopleuras are toothed and have a spine above the mesocoxa. The expanded metapleurae are dentate, with the last two teeth being the larger ones. The second segment of the abdomen has an anterior and a posterior pair of tubercles on the upper side. On segments three to five there are four tubercles in the posterior area, one medial and one lateral pair. Only a pair of medial tubercles can be seen on the sixth segment. This species differs from the somewhat smaller Tisamenus alviolanus found on Negros only in the more clearly rounded ventrobasal swellings on the metafemora and the distribution area. The males of Tisamenus cervicornis are chocolate brown and reach a length of 34 to 37 millimetres (1.3 to 1.5 in). The middle of the posterior edges of the meso- and metanotum are at most slightly rounded, whereas in those of the very similar males of Tisamenus deplanatus they are clearly arched and form clearly visible elevations from the side. The females of Tisamenus cervicornis are usually lighter and more contrastingly colored than the males and grow to 47 to 53 millimetres (1.9 to 2.1 in) in length. The ventral side is beige in the area of the meso- and meso- and metasternum.

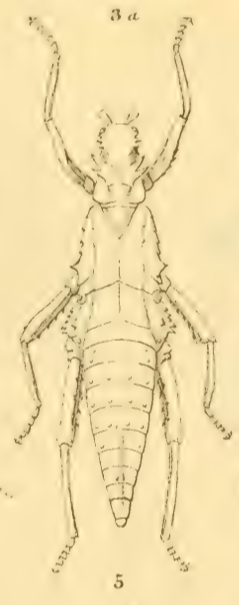
Tisamenus cervicornis, female from the species description by Bolívar

== Taxonomy ==
Ignacio Bolívar described the species in 1890 under the current name. It depicts a female in top view and her ovipositor in detail from the side. He names Camarines Sur, a province in the south of the island of Luzon, as the origin of the two animals originally deposited as syntypes and lists Mazarrdo as the collector. This refers to Carlos Mazarredo, who lived in the Philippines between 1882 and 1885 and also collected other specimens for the Museo Nacional de Ciencias Naturales in Madrid. The 48 millimetres (1.9 in) long female specimen, now selected as the holotype or lectotype, and the 35 millimetres (1.4 in) long male paralectotype or paratype of Tisamenus cervicornis are also deposited there. Both specimens are damaged, although the male is more severely damaged. The species name "cervicornis" means "deer antlers" and refers to the forward-facing, multi-spined ridges on the pronotum.

James Abram Garfield Rehn and his son John William Holman Rehn, who did not have the type specimens of Tisamenus cervicornis described by Bolívar available for examination, synonymized the genus Tisamenus with the genus Hoploclonia in 1939. At the same time, they described Hoploclonia fratercula, among other species now classified in Hoploclonia. This species was described from a single male collected by W. Boetcher on April 10, 1916, in Butucan in today's Batangas Province or in Tayabas in Quezon Province was deposited as holotype in the Academy of Natural Sciences of Drexel University in Philadelphia. The choice of the species name "fratercula", which is borrowed from Latin and means "little monk" or "little brother", is not explained. It could refer to the reported coloration of the male, which is described as "dark chocolate brown, venter lighter", reminiscent of the robes worn by monks. On the other hand, it could be meant as the "little brother" of Hoploclonia tagalog, since Rehn and Rehn call this species "closely related" and described Hoploclonia fratercula as with "slightly shorter body". In 2025, Frank H. Hennemann synonymized Tisamenus fratercula, which was listed in the restored genus Tisamenus, with Tisamenus cervicornis and found that a female described and illustrated by Rehn and Rehn as a representative of Hoploclonia deplanata, which is deposited in the National Museum of Natural History in Washington, D.C., is also a representative of Tisamenus cervicornis.

Rehn and Rehn divided the Philippine representatives of the genus into different groups according to morphological aspects. In the so-called Deplanata group, they placed Hoploclonia deplanata (now Tisamenus deplanatus), Hoploclonia armadillo (now Tisamenus armadillo), Hoploclonia spadix (now Tisamenus spadix) and Hoploclonia tagalog (now Tisamenus tagalog), alongside Hoploclonia cervicornis and Hoploclonia fratercula, relatively spineless species with a flat upper surface, which, apart from the supracoxal spines on the edges of the thorax, show no or hardly any spines, but at most teeth. An official restoration of the original name Tisamenus cervicornis was carried out in 2004 by Oliver Zompro, who transferred or re-transferred all Philippine representatives, including Hoploclonia fratercula, of the species previously listed in Hoploclonia to the genus Tisamenus.

== Distribution ==
The currently known distribution area includes various provinces in the south of Luzon and the north of Samar. On Luzon, Tisamenus cervicornis has been found in Camarines Sur, the type locality of the species, in the Pocdol Mountains region of Sorsogon, as well as in Albay and Quezon. Photographs of the species show that it also occurs on the island of Bohol, where both sexes were photographed in Bilar.

The female, designated as Hoploclonia deplanata by Rehn and Rehn, which has been assigned to Tisamenus cervicornis since 2025, originates from Surigao on the island of Mindanao. While this island could also be part of the species' distribution area, it is doubtful that it does not fit into the currently known overall distribution area of the genus.

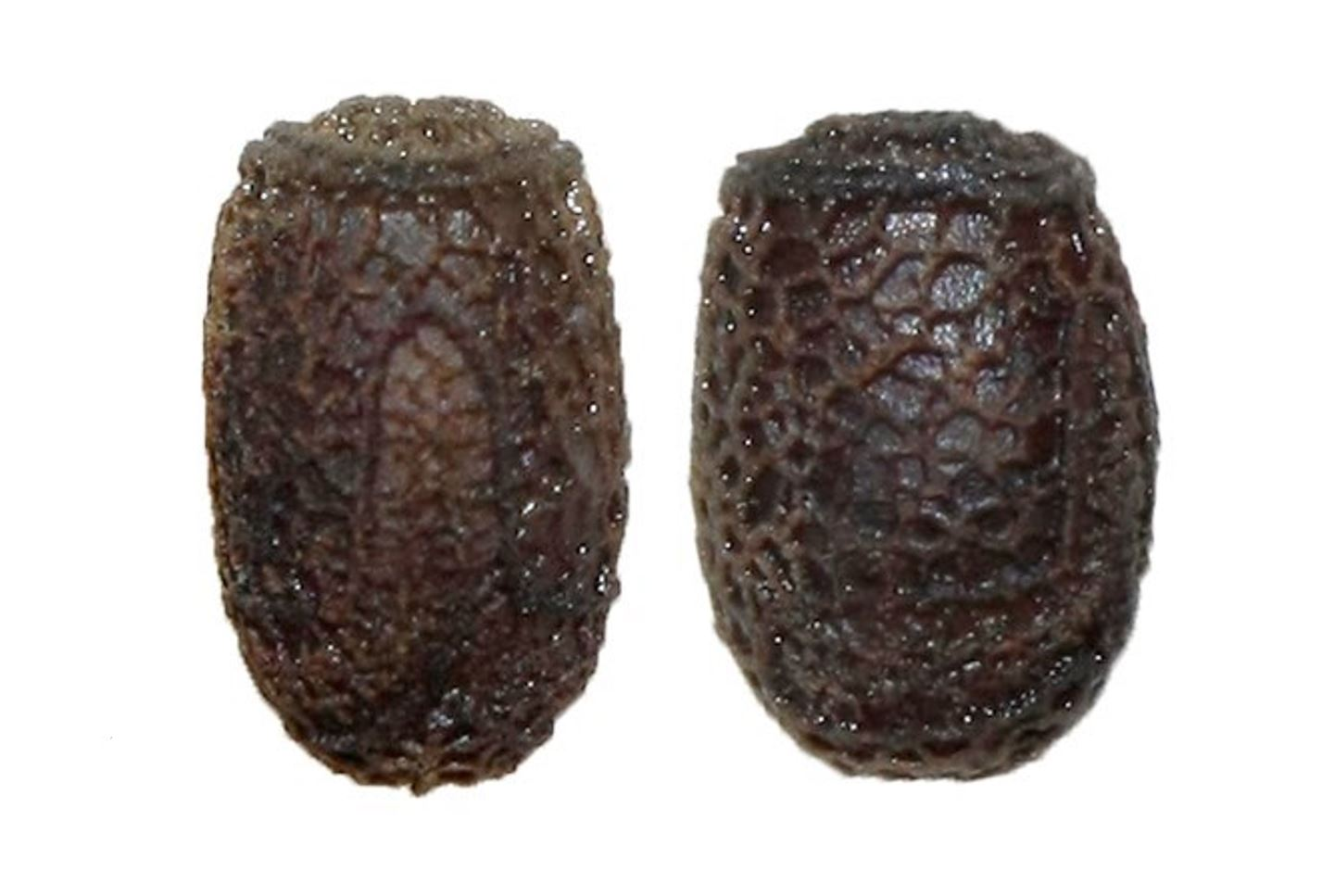
Eggs: left from dorsal, right from lateral

== Reproduction and life cycle ==
The eggs laid by the females using the ovipositor are 3.9 millimetres (0.15 in) long, 2.5 millimetres (0.098 in) wide, and 2.8 millimetres (0.11 in) high, including the operculum. The nymphs begin to hatch after about four to five months and are already 16 millimetres (0.63 in) long. Males reach adulthood after about five months, and females after six to seven months. They begin laying eggs after another four to five weeks.

== Terraristics ==
Thierry Heitzmann collected the species for the first time in October 2010 in the south of Luzon in the Pocdol Mountains, where he found it on Mount Pulog (not to be confused with Mount Pulag in the north of Luzon). He found more animals the following month on Mount Osiao. After successfully breeding the species, he distributed it to other breeders. In Europe, it was first bred in 2012 by Bruno Kneubühler and, following an initial identification, he named it Tisamenus deplanatus 'Pocdol' and distributed it. Under this name, it was given the PSG number 399 by the Phasmid Study Group. Hennemann identified this breeding stock as Tisamenus cervicornis in 2025. In all publications relating to this breeding line up to that point, the species was referred to as Tisamenus deplanatus. However, they refer to Tisamenus cervicornis ('Pocdol'). The species is very uncomplicated to keep and breed. They eat leaves from bramble, or other Rosaceae, as well as from hazel, salal and Prunus laurocerasus.

== Gallery ==
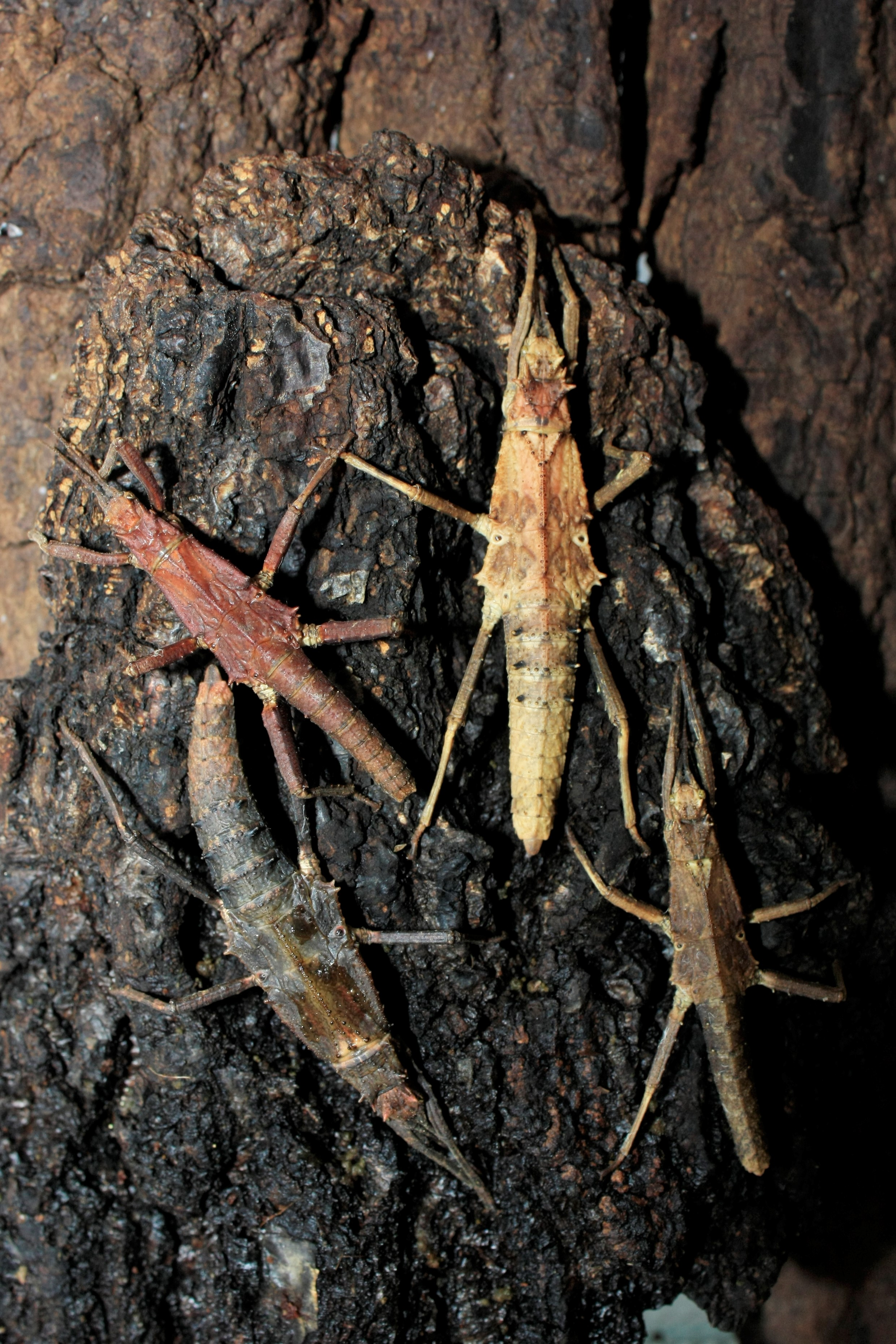
Two males and two female nymphs

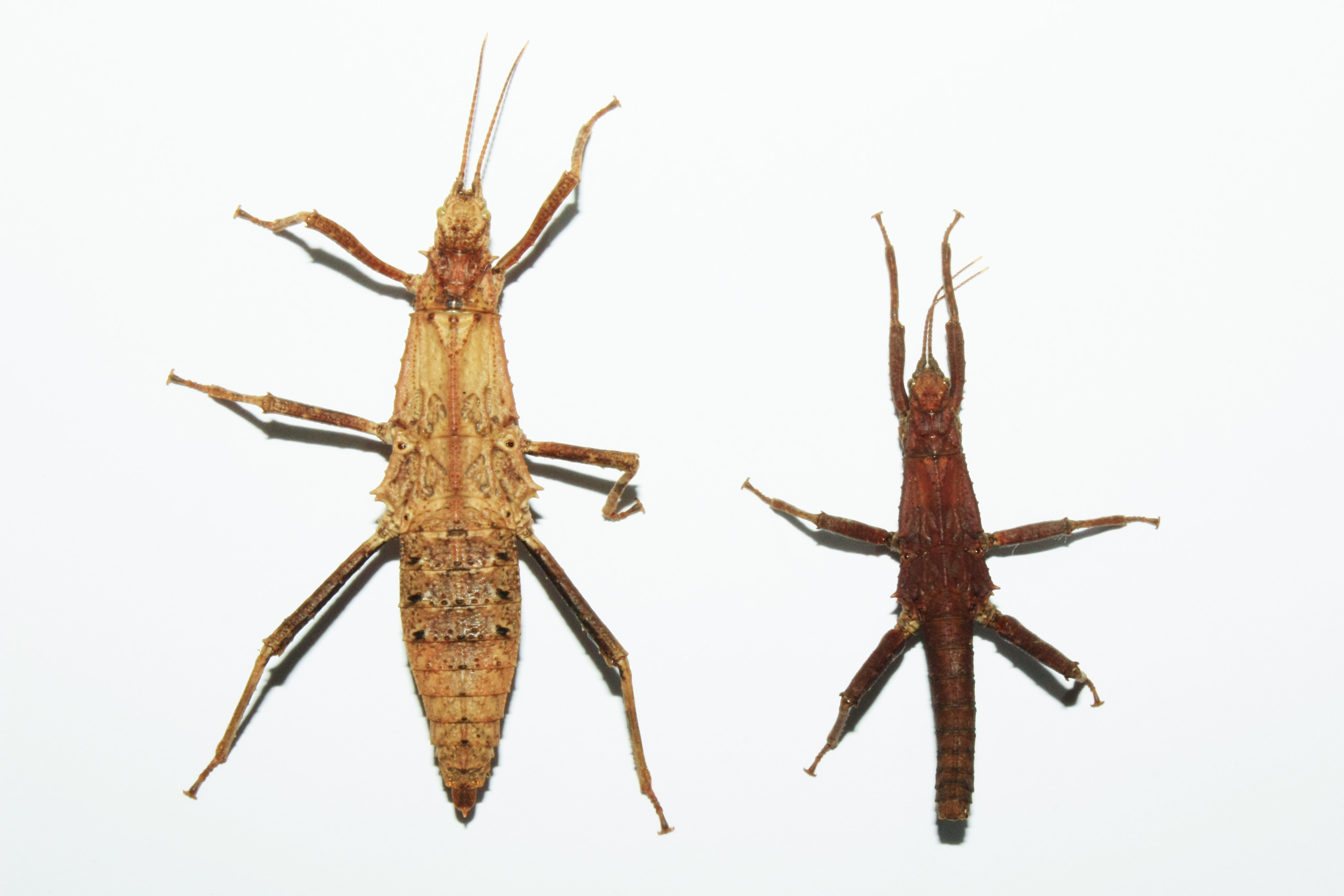
Pair from dorsal

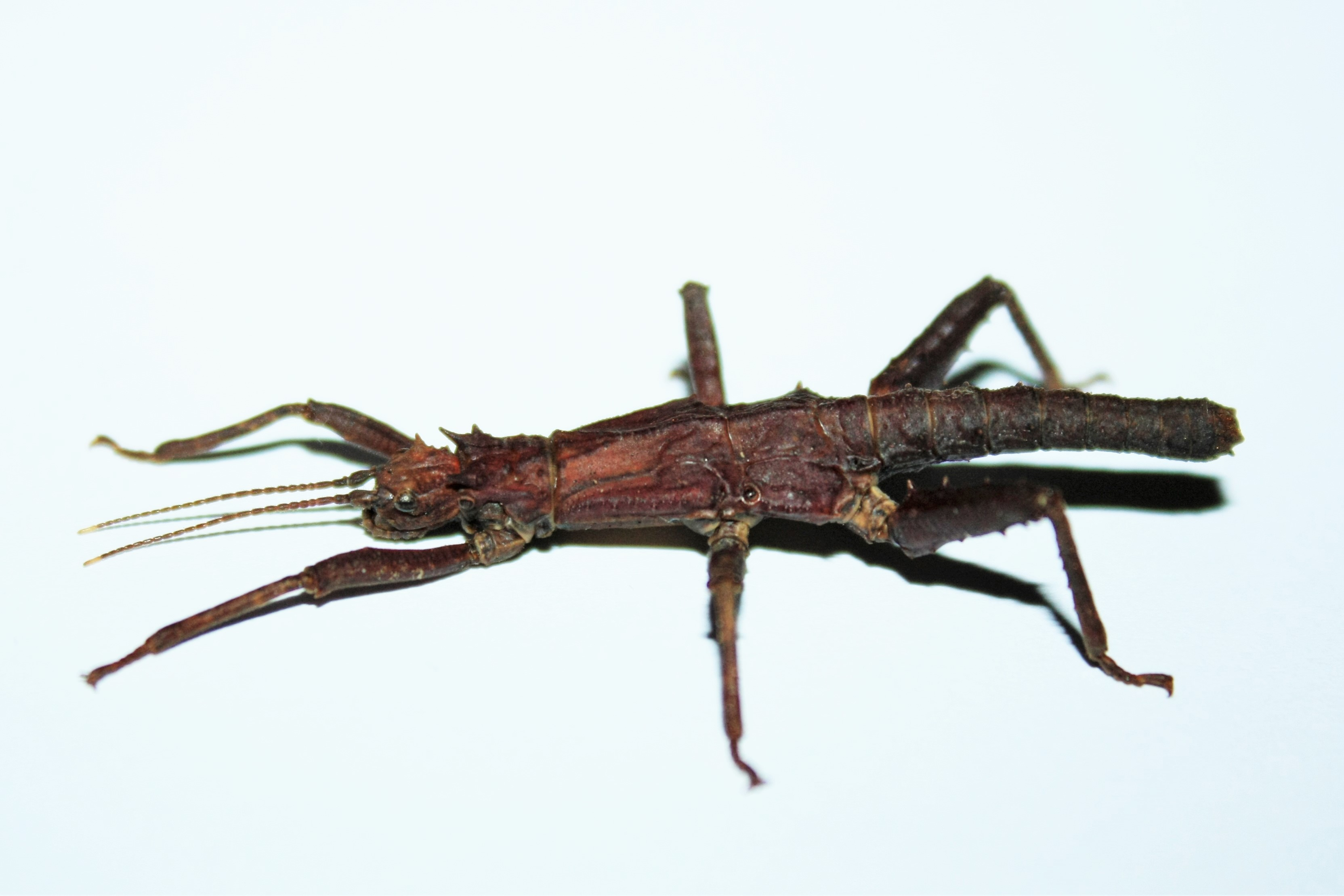
Male from lateral

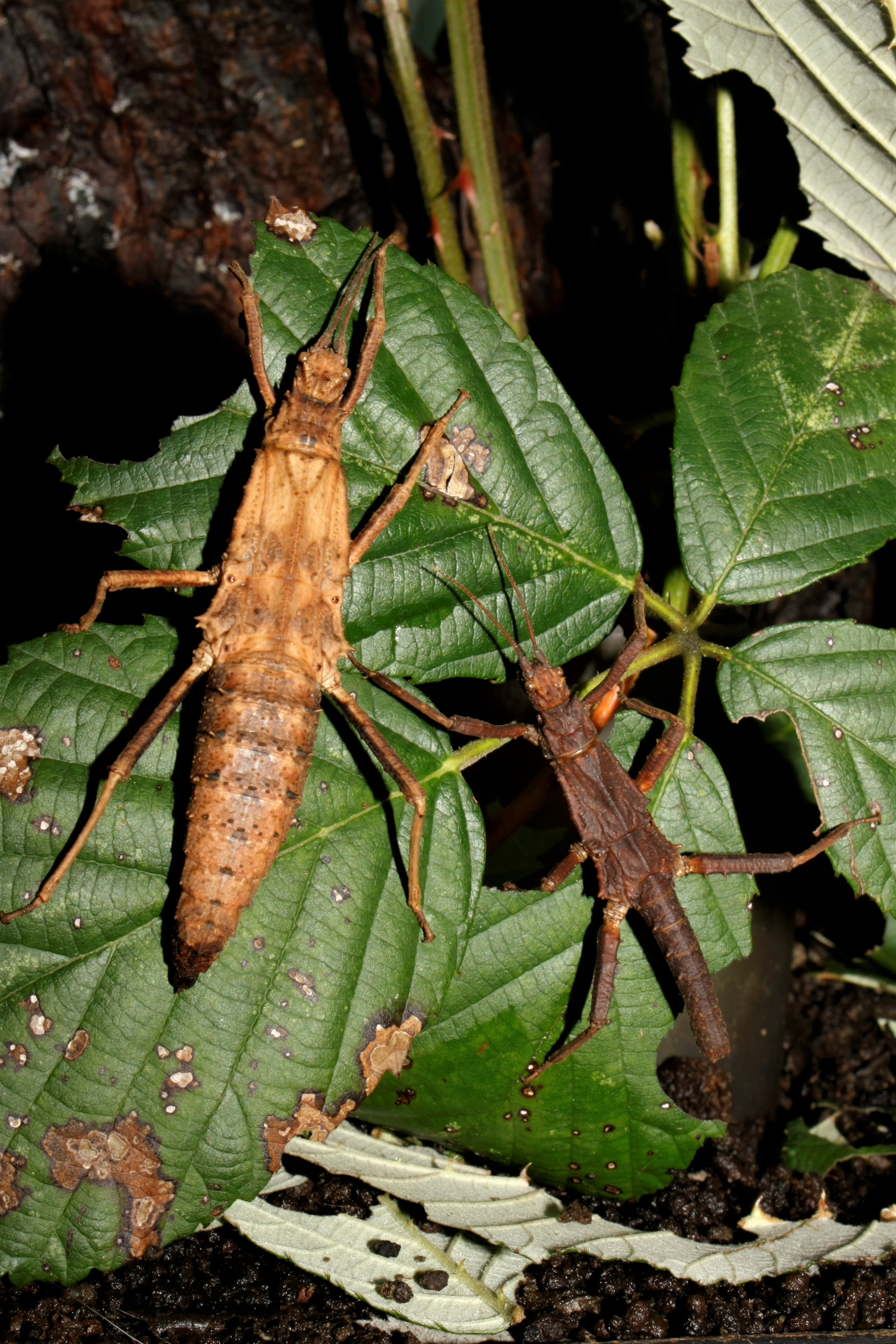
Pair
