= Tisamenus tagalog =

Scientific classification
- Kingdom: Animalia
- Phylum: Arthropoda
- Clade: Pancrustacea
- Class: Insecta
- Order: Phasmatodea
- Family: Heteropterygidae
- Subfamily: Obriminae
- Tribe: Obrimini
- Genus: Tisamenus
- Species: T. tagalog

Binomial name
- Tisamenus tagalog (Rehn & Rehn, 1939)

Synonyms
- Hoploclonia tagalog Rehn & Rehn, 1939

Species of stick insect

Tisamenus tagalog is a stick insect species from the family of Heteropterygidae endemic to the Philippine island of Masbate.

== Description ==
Tisamenus tagalog is a medium-sized Tisamenus species of which only a single, 37.8 millimetres (1.49 in) long male is known. This male closely resembles the male Tisamenus armadillo. The triangle on the mesonotum, typical of this genus, is rather convex in the male of Tisamenus tagalog, with slightly bumpy edges and only slightly prominent anterior angles, while in the male of Tisamenus armadillo it is rather concave with triangular, prominent anterior angles. Furthermore, in Tisamenus tagalog, the anterior double spines on the pronotum are somewhat larger and more deeply split. The supracoxal spines located above the coxae of the meso- and metapleura and the supraorbital spines located on the head are stronger and more spiny than in the male of Tisamenus armadillo.

== Occurrence and taxonomy ==
James Abram Garfield Rehn and his son John William Holman Rehn described the species in 1939 as Hoploclonia tagalog based on a single male specimen. This male was collected on August 8, 1912, by W. Boettcher in Aroroy on the island of Masbate and came via the collection of Morgan Hebard to the Academy of Natural Sciences in Philadelphia (ANSP), where it is deposited as the holotype. The species name "tagalog" is dedicated to the Tagalog people, a Filipino ethnic group and their Tagalog language, which is the most widely spoken language in the Philippines and is also spoken on Masbate.

Rehn and Rehn divided the Philippine representatives they listed or described in Hoploclonia into different groups according to morphological aspects. In the so-called Deplanata group, they placed, alongside Hoploclonia tagalog, Hoploclonia deplanata (now Tisamenus deplanatus), Hoploclonia armadillo (now Tisamenus armadillo), Hoploclonia cervicornis (now Tisamenus cervicornis), Hoploclonia spadix (now Tisamenus spadix) and Hoploclonia fratercula (since 2025 Synonym of Tisamenus fratercula) relatively spineless species with a flat upper surface, which, apart from the supracoxal spines on the edges of the thorax, show no spines, but at most only teeth. Until 2004, Tisamenus tagalog was listed in Hoploclonia. Only Oliver Zompro placed the species, along with all other Philippine representatives, in the genus Tisamenus.
