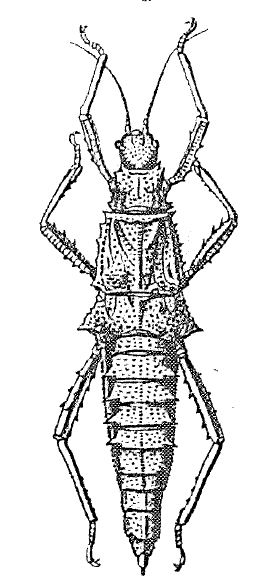
- Tisamenus armadillo, drawing of a female from Redtenbacher's original description in 1906

Scientific classification
- Kingdom: Animalia
- Phylum: Arthropoda
- Clade: Pancrustacea
- Class: Insecta
- Order: Phasmatodea
- Family: Heteropterygidae
- Subfamily: Obriminae
- Tribe: Obrimini
- Genus: Tisamenus
- Species: T. armadillo

Binomial name
- Tisamenus armadillo Redtenbacher, 1906

Synonyms
- Hoploclonia armadillo (Redtenbacher, 1906)

= Tisamenus armadillo =

Species of stick insect

Tisamenus armadillo is a stick insect species (Phasmatodea) in the family Heteropterygidae, endemic to the Philippines.

== Description ==
With a length of 48 to 53 millimetres (1.9 to 2.1 in) or 56 millimetres (2.2 in) in females and approx. 33 millimetres (1.3 in) or 37 millimetres (1.5 in) in length in males, the species is considered to be an average-sized representative of the genus Tisamenus. Both sexes show a broad, granular edge (carina) under the eyes, which are connected with three spines at the back of the head. The pronotum of females is granulated behind. The distinctly elevated triangle on the mesonotum typical of the genus is somewhat wider than it is long and reaches almost the middle of the mesonotum. On the lateral edges of the metanotum there is a large, conical spine over the hips. The anterior tergites of the abdomen are equal in width up to and including the fourth. The fifth to seventh segments are narrower behind than in front, while the eighth to tenth are equally wide but narrower than the seventh. The eighth segment is as long as the ninth. The tenth segment is longer and shows a distinct midline carina. The supraanal plate, also known as the epiproct, which forms the upper portion of the ovipositor, is as long as the eighth segment and curves downward from the middle. The lower portion of the ovipositor, the subgenital plate, slightly overhangs the supraanal plate. It is pointed and shows a clear edge, especially in the rear part. The males show basically the same characteristics as the females, but are smaller and not as compact.

The brown eggs are 3.3 millimetres (0.13 in) long, 2.3 millimetres (0.091 in) wide and 2.8 millimetres (0.11 in) high. The micropylar plate forms approximately an isosceles triangle, with the micropyle in the middle of the lower side line. The lid (operculum) is flat and almost circular.

== Taxonomy ==
Josef Redtenbacher described the species in 1906 as Tisamenus armadillo based on a female from the Dresden Museum (today Staatliches Museum für Tierkunde Dresden or State Museum of Zoology Dresden). The chosen species name "armadillo" refers to the resemblance to armadillos. James Abram Garfield Rehn and his son John William Holman Rehn transferred the species to the genus Hoploclonia in 1939, along with all other previously described species of the genus. At the same time, they divided the genus into different groups according to morphological aspects. In the so-called Deplanata group, they placed with Hoploclonia armadillo, Hoploclonia deplanata (today Tisamenus deplanatus), Hoploclonia cervicornis (today Tisamenus cervicornis), Hoploclonia spadix (today Tisamenus spadix), Hoploclonia tagalog (today Tisamenus tagalog) and Hoploclonia fratercula (today Tisamenus fratercula), relatively unspined species, with a flat upper surface, which except for the supra coxal spines on the edges of the thorax show almost no spines, but at most small teeth. In 2001, Oliver Zompro established a female from the State Museum of Zoology Dresden as the lectotype. He also describes and depicts for the first time a male and an egg removed from the ovipositor of a female. In addition to these, he mentions another female deposited there. In 2001 Zompro retained the assignment of the species to Hoploclonia, but no longer mentioned it in 2003 and listed the Dresden type material as Tisamenus armadillo. In 2004, he transferred the species to the genus Tisamenus along with the rest of the Philippine species listed in the genus Hoploclonia, leaving only the Borneo species in Hoploclonia.

== Distribution area ==
While Redtenbacher in 1906 only gave the Philippines as the place of discovery, Zompro in 2004 mentioned two specimens from Dresden that he examined, which were collected by W. Schultze in Burgos in the province of Ilocos Norte on the island of Luzon.
