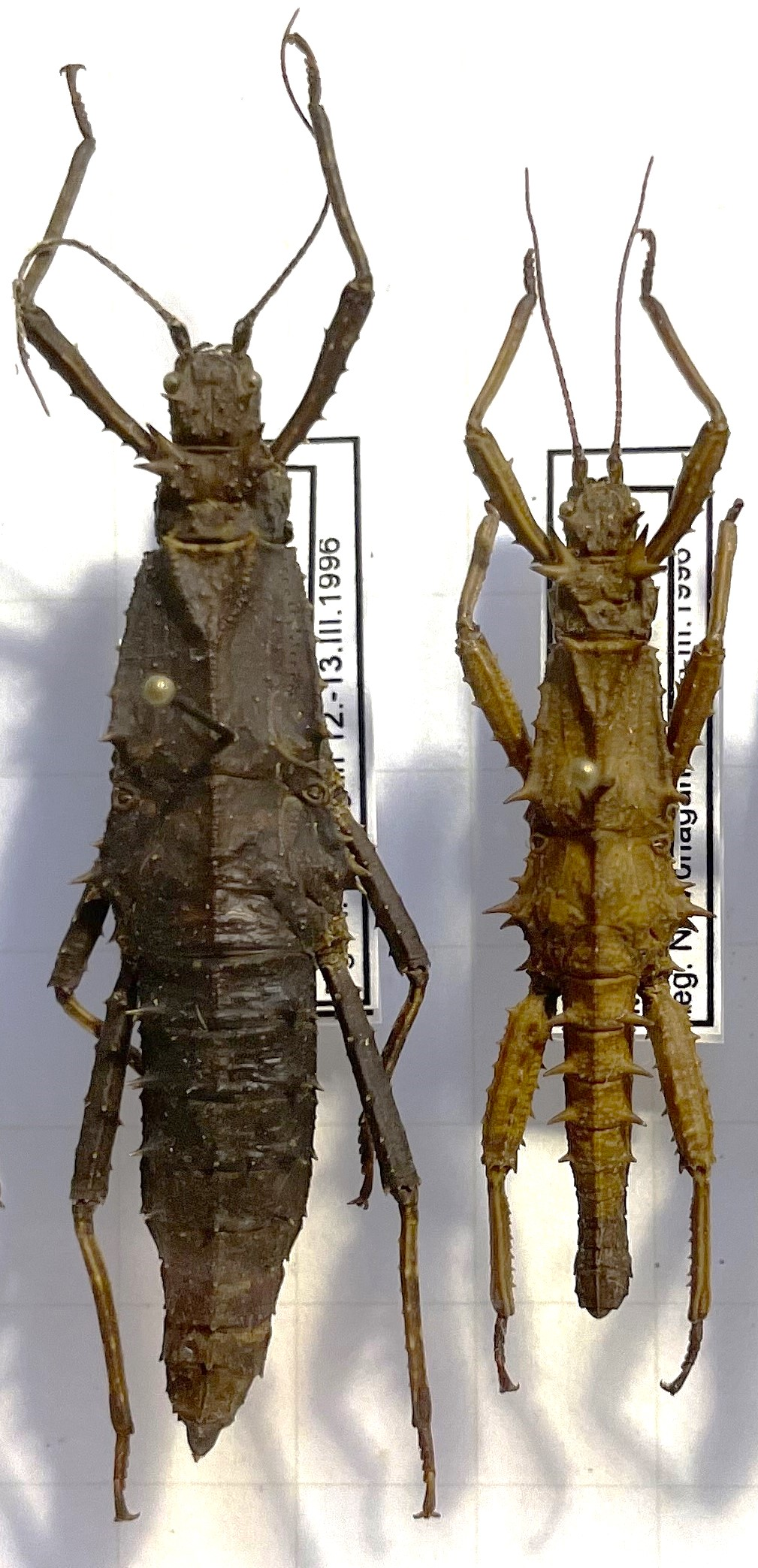
- Tisamenus spadix, pair from the collection of Frank H. Hennemann

Scientific classification
- Kingdom: Animalia
- Phylum: Arthropoda
- Clade: Pancrustacea
- Class: Insecta
- Order: Phasmatodea
- Family: Heteropterygidae
- Subfamily: Obriminae
- Tribe: Obrimini
- Genus: Tisamenus
- Species: T. spadix

Binomial name
- Tisamenus spadix (Rehn & Rehn, 1939)

Synonyms
- Hoploclonia spadix Rehn & Rehn, 1939

= Tisamenus spadix =

Species of stick insect

Tisamenus spadix is a stick insect species from the family of Heteropterygidae endemic to the Philippine island of Panay.

== Occurrence ==
The type material of the species comes from the island of Panay in the Visayas Islands.

== Taxonomy ==
James Abram Garfield Rehn and his son John William Holman Rehn described the species in 1939 as Hoploclonia spadix. The species name "spadix" means spade-shaped or thickened. An adult male from the collection of Morgan Hebard collected by Baker between May 18 and 24, 1918 in Culasi in the province of Antique in the northwest of the island of Panay was chosen as the holotype. Three other specimens collected by Richard Crittenden McGregor were also examined, including an adult female, which is referred to as the allotype. The other two specimens are a juvenile male and a juvenile female. All three are deposited as paratypes, together with the holotype, at the Academy of Natural Sciences of Drexel University in Philadelphia.

Rehn and Rehn divided the Philippine species of the genus into different groups according to morphological aspects. They placed Hoploclonia spadix in the so-called Deplanata group. In addition to Hoploclonia deplanata (now Tisamenus deplanatus) and Hoploclonia spadix, they assigned to this group Hoploclonia cervicornis (now Tisamenus cervicornis), Hoploclonia armadillo (now Tisamenus armadillo), Hoploclonia tagalog (now Tisamenus tagalog) and Hoploclonia fratercula (now Tisamenus fratercula), relatively spineless species with a flat upper surface, which show no or hardly any spines except for the supracoxal spines on the edges of the thorax, but at most teeth. In 2004, Oliver Zompro transferred the species, along with all other Philippine species, to the genus Tisamenus and left only the species occurring on Borneo in the genus Hoploclonia.

== Description ==
According to the first description, Tisamenus spadix is very similar to Tisamenus fratercula. It differs from this and all other species of the so-called Deplanata group of Rehn and Rehn by the presence of a spine on the hind hip (metacoxa), the so-called metacoxale. The genus-typical triangle on the mesonotum is wider than it is long in females and longer than it is wide in males. It is clearly concave, more so than in Tisamenus tagalog.

Males are about 37 millimetres (1.5 in) long, which is of average length for the representatives of the Deplanata group. Their overall shape is rather broad. The body surface is covered with scattered granules. The legs are relatively short, strong and clearly notched. The head is rectangular and slightly longer than wide, with clearly prominent, almost spherical eyes. The first antennal segment (base segment or scapus) is relatively long and triangular, the second (pedicel or stem segment) is quite short and barrel-shaped. All other segments are also short and cylindrical. On the head there are low keels (carinae), which end posteriorly in rather strong, supraorbital spines. The occipital spines and the medial and lateral coronal spines are recognizable only as flat tubercles. Behind the supraorbitals there is a pair of low warts. The pronotum is almost square and its triangular area is bordered by low carinae. Its front corners end in large, conspicuous, slightly forward-facing double spines. The mesonotum is elongated. Its genus-typical triangle is slightly longer than it is wide and reaches to the middle of the mesonotum. Behind it, starting from the rear corner of the triangle, there is a clear longitudinal keel that continues across the entire metanotum and the segments of the abdomen. Large, paired spines are located on the sides of tergites 2 to 4 of the abdomen.

Adult females are about 49 millimetres (1.9 in) long. They are essentially similar to males, but more elongated and relatively broader. The triangle on the mesonotum is wider than it is long and does not reach the middle. Its edge is granulated. The longitudinal carina of the metasternum is not as pronounced. The abdominal tergites are broader and their posterior margins show a series of transverse nodes and a posteromesal node on tergites 2 to 6. The middle carina of the seventh to ninth tergites is raised posteriorly and vertically sloping at the posterior margin.
