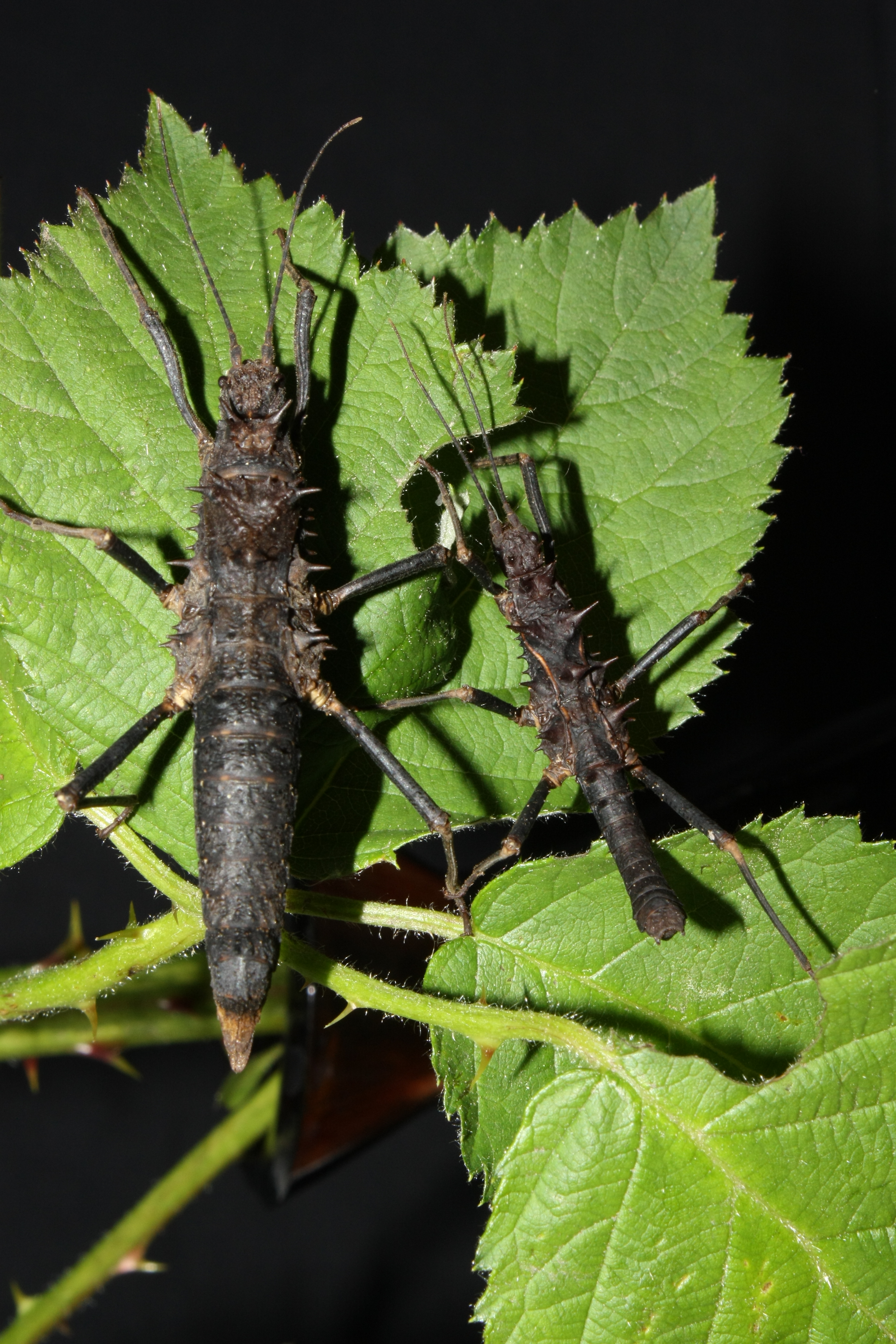
- Hoploclonia abercrombiei, female

Scientific classification
- Kingdom: Animalia
- Phylum: Arthropoda
- Class: Insecta
- Order: Phasmatodea
- Family: Heteropterygidae
- Subfamily: Obriminae
- Tribe: Hoplocloniini
- Genus: Hoploclonia
- Species: H. abercrombiei

Binomial name
- Hoploclonia abercrombiei Bragg, 1995

= Hoploclonia abercrombiei =

Species of stick insect

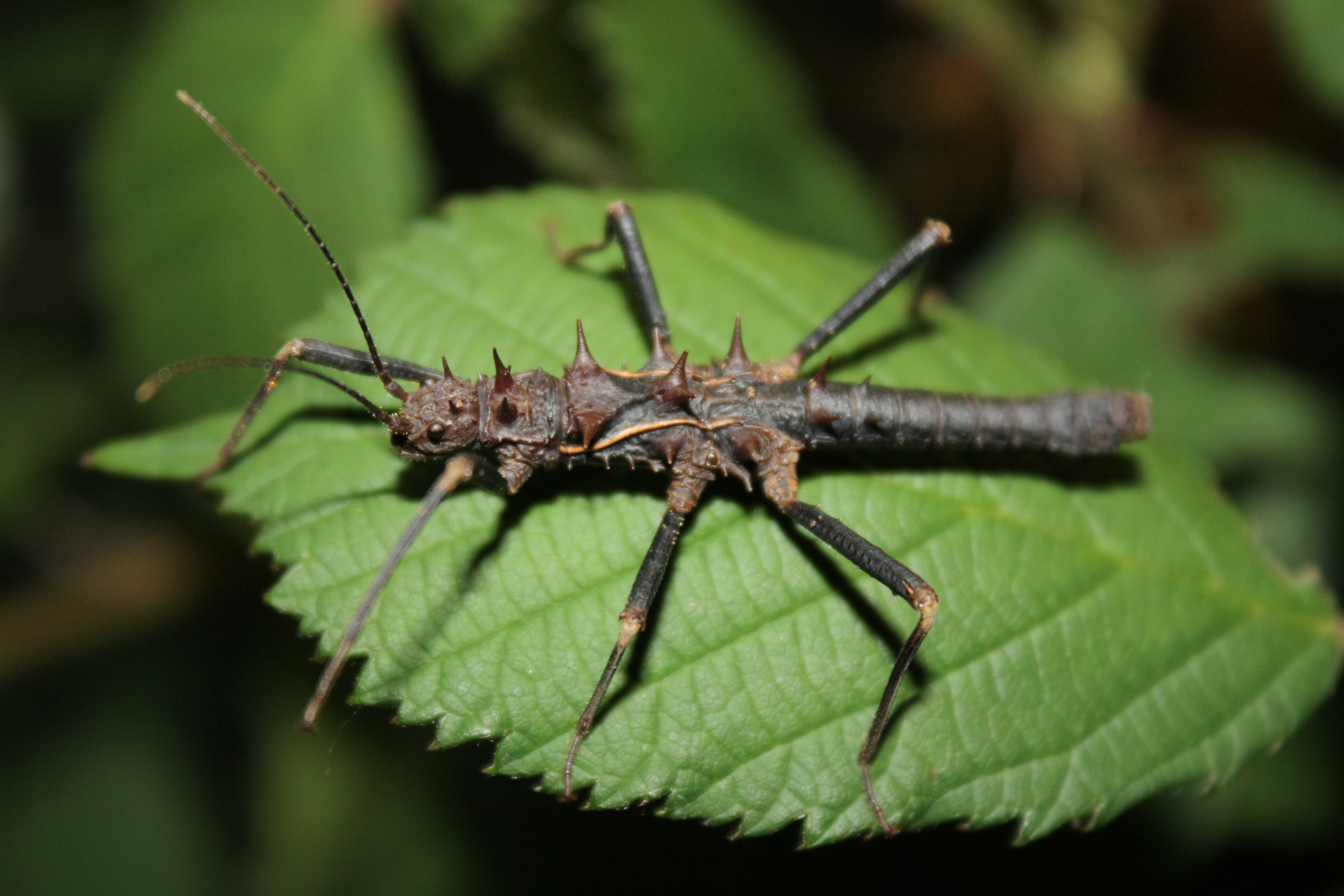
male

Hoploclonia abercrombiei is a stick insect species known from the northwest of Borneo, more precisely from only one place in the Malay state Sarawak. The sometimes used common name Abercrombie's stick insect.

== Distribution, discovery and taxonomy ==
The first male of this species was discovered in 1992 by Philip Edward Bragg in the Niah National Park in Sarawak near the Great Cave of Niah. However, Bragg initially thought it was a male of Hoploclonia cuspidata, from which it differed mainly in the missing pair of spines on the fourth abdominal segment and the slightly different coloration. After a closer examination, he and Ian Abercrombie decided in 1994 to look again at the same place, where three more males and three females were found, two of them copulating pairs. In the following year Bragg described the species and dedicated the species name to Ian Abercrombie (26 January 1947 in Dover – 20 February 2016). A female is deposited as a holotype in the Natural History Museum, London.

Hoploclonia abercrombiei and Hoploclonia apiensis a species also described by Bragg in 1995 were synonymous with Hoploclonia cuspidata by Francis Seow-Choen in 2016. As early as 2018, a study based on genetic analysis proved that Hoploclonia abercrombiei is an independent one and is therefore a valid species.

== Description ==
In this species, the males are 35 to 40 millimetres (1.4 to 1.6 in) and the females 45 to 55 millimetres (1.8 to 2.2 in) long. The head, thorax and the second and third segments of the abdomen are covered with paired spines. In adult males, the spiny areas and especially the spines themselves are dark brown and therefore mostly a little lighter than the rest of the black-brown colored body. At the edges of the tergits of meso- and metathorax there are two beige to orange-yellow, species-typical marginal ridges. When viewed from above, they appear as two curved lines that converge closer to the rear. The base of the tibae is also noticeably yellowish. The females, which are also very dark in color, have shorter spines, but these are arranged in the same way as those of the males. The end of the abdomen forms a short laying spine (ovipositor) to deposit the eggs in the ground.

== Way of life and reproduction ==
During the day, the stick insects hide in the leaves or vegetation near the ground. At night they climb up the food plants, never climb areas that are far from the ground. The eggs, which are 3.3 to 3.9 millimetres (0.13 to 0.15 in)s long and 2.5 to 3.0 millimetres (0.098 to 0.118 in) wide, are laid in the ground by the females with the ovipositor. They have a bulging dorsal area and, as a result, a lid (operculum) that slopes downwards towards the ventral side. The nymphs need an average of six months to hatch, but depending on the climate it can be three to eight months. Until the moulting to imago passes again at least half a year.

== In terraristics ==
The breeding stocks found in the lovers' terrariums go back to the specimens found by Bragg and Abercrombie in 1994. Abercrombie successfully bred a pair of these animals. Only small terrariums are needed to keep them. It is important to have permanently high humidity and a layer of substrate suitable for laying eggs, at least three centimeters high, on the terrarium floor, but as with all representatives of the genus, breeding and keeping is tricky. The leaves of bramble, other Rosaceae, as well as hazel, oak or rhododendrons are easy to feed. For Hoploclonia abercrombiei the Phasmid Study Group assigned the PSG number 165.
