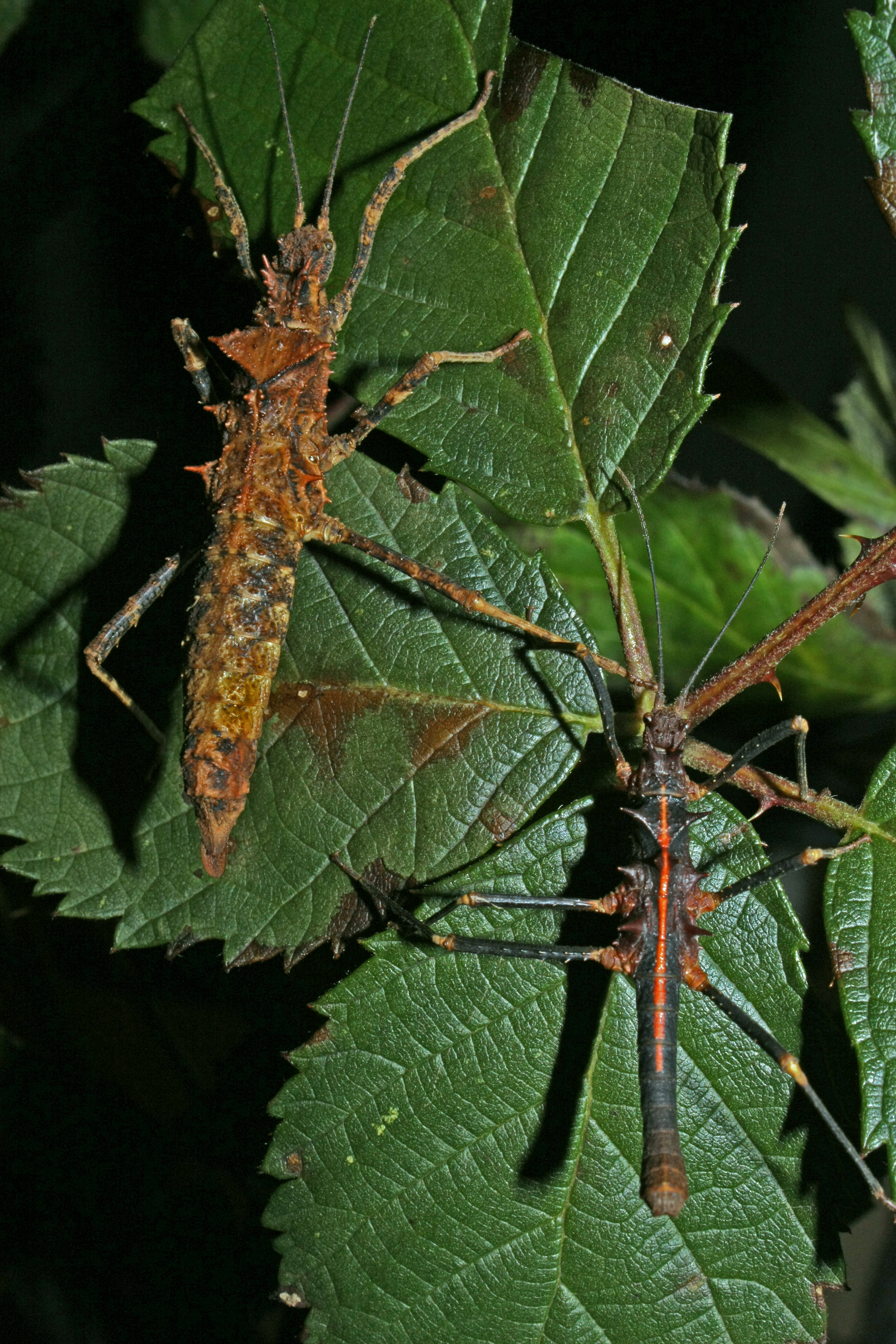
- Hoploclonia gecko, female

Scientific classification
- Kingdom: Animalia
- Phylum: Arthropoda
- Class: Insecta
- Order: Phasmatodea
- Family: Heteropterygidae
- Subfamily: Obriminae
- Tribe: Hoplocloniini
- Genus: Hoploclonia
- Species: H. gecko

Binomial name
- Hoploclonia gecko (Westwood, 1859)

Synonyms
- Acanthoderus gecko Westwood, 1859

= Hoploclonia gecko =

Species of stick insect

Hoploclonia gecko is a relatively small, spiny and darkly colored stick insect species that is native to the northwest of Borneo.

== Taxonomy ==
Alfred Russel Wallace collected in Sarawak in 1858 a number ofspecimens, but did not leave any more precise information about the location. John Obadiah Westwood described these the following year as Acanthoderus gecko. When describing it, both males and females were available to him. Because of the specific epithet chosen by Westwood, it is also called "Gecko Stick Insect".

In 1875 Carl Stål established the genus Hoploclonia for this species alone, which became the type species as Hoploclonia gecko. The genus remained monotypical until the description of Hoploclonia cuspidata in 1906.

In 1995 a female of Philip Edward Bragg from the specimens collected by Wallace was selected as lectotype. It is deposited together with two male paralectotypes in the Natural History Museum. Other specimens collected by Wallace are kept as paralectotypes in the Oxford University Museum of Natural History.

== Description ==
The insects, wingless in both sexes, have typical spines on their bodies like all representatives of this genus. In the 30 to 35 millimetres (1.2 to 1.4 in) long males, these are located in pairs on the head and the thorax, but not on the abdomen. The pair of spines on the pronotum is forked. Adult males are dominated by a dark, mostly black-brown basic color with a bright yellow-orange to red longitudinal line, which extends from the rear edge of the pronotum to the middle of the abdomen. As with the other representatives of the genus, the areas around the coxae, as well as the distal ends of the femurs and the proximal ends of the tibae, i.e. the knee area, colored light yellow to orange.

The females are 40 to 50 millimetres (1.6 to 2.0 in) long. They can be colored more or less high-contrast light, dark or red-brown. They have clear spines on the thorax. On the mesothorax the first pair of spines forms a flat triangle, very broad at the base, which is much more pronounced than in other Hoploclonia species. Overall, they are very robust from the habitus. The relatively short abdomen is plump in egg-laying females and approximately cylindrical in cross-section. The end of the abdomen is formed by a short ovipositor, which is used to lay the eggs in the ground.

== Distribution ==
Hoploclonia gecko is native to the northwest of Borneo, more precisely in the far west of the Malaysian state Sarawak. The species was found here in Bako National Park, on Mount Santubong, on Mount Serapi, in Matang and Lingga. The main area of distribution is the area around Kuching, the capital of Sarawak. On Mount Santubong she was found up to a height of 300 metres (980 ft).

== Way of life and reproduction ==
Like almost all stick insects, Hoploclonia gecko is nocturnal. To eat, they do not climb higher than 30 centimetres (12 in) up the food plants. The females lay their eggs with the ovipositor only a few millimeters deep in the ground. The eggs are 4.1 to 4.2 millimetres (0.16 to 0.17 in) long, 2.9 to 3.0 millimetres (0.11 to 0.12 in) high and 2.6 to 2.7 millimetres (0.10 to 0.11 in) wide. Like all Hoploclonia species, they are more arched on the dorsal side and have a lid (operculum) sloping towards the ventral side, which forms an opercular angle of less than 10 degrees. Of the three arms of the micropylar plate, one faces the lid, while the other two run laterally in the direction of the lower pole and enclose about 2/3 of the egg.

== In terraristics ==
Hoploclonia gecko was the first species of the genus that appeared in the terrarium at the end of the 1980s. Philip Bragg collected some specimens in December 1987 in the Bako National Park, which he was able to successfully reproduce and spread. He brought further representatives of this species with him from Mount Serapi in 1990. The species was given PSG number 110 by the Phasmid Study Group.

As with all Hoploclonia species, keeping and breeding is considered difficult. Small terrariums with higher humidity and a substrate for laying eggs are required. Leaves of bramble, other Rosaceae, as well as oak, ivy, Crataegus and Pyracantha species are accepted as food.
