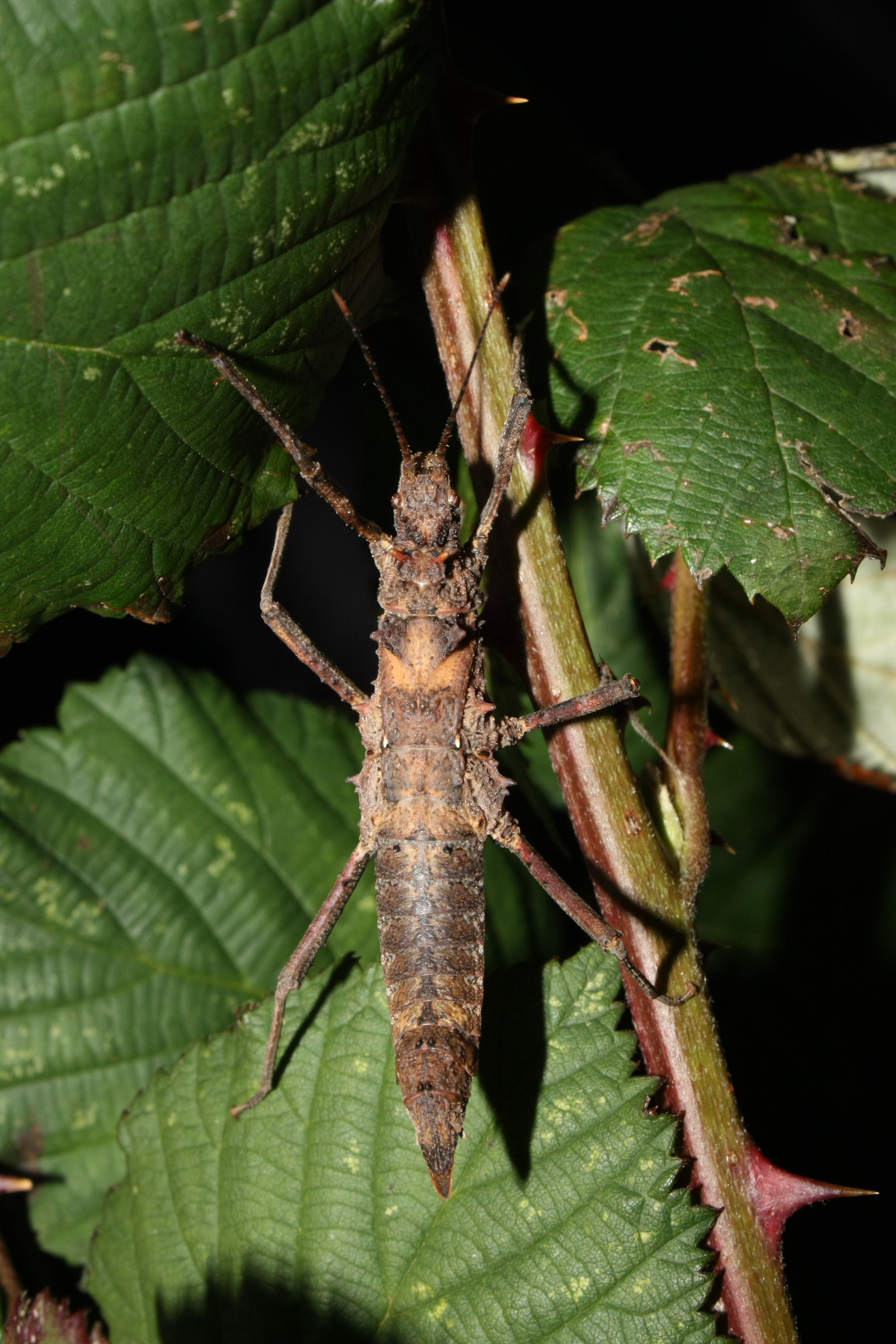
- Hoploclonia cuspidata, female

Scientific classification
- Domain: Eukaryota
- Kingdom: Animalia
- Phylum: Arthropoda
- Class: Insecta
- Order: Phasmatodea
- Family: Heteropterygidae
- Subfamily: Obriminae
- Tribe: Hoplocloniini
- Genus: Hoploclonia
- Species: H. cuspidata

Binomial name
- Hoploclonia cuspidata Redtenbacher, 1906

Subspecies
- Hoploclonia cuspidata cuspidata Redtenbacher, 1906; Hoploclonia cuspidata crockerensis Seow-Choen, 2016

Synonyms
- Hoploclonia apiensis Bragg, 1995; Dares (Epidares) haematacanthus Redtenbacher, 1906

= Hoploclonia cuspidata =

Species of stick insect

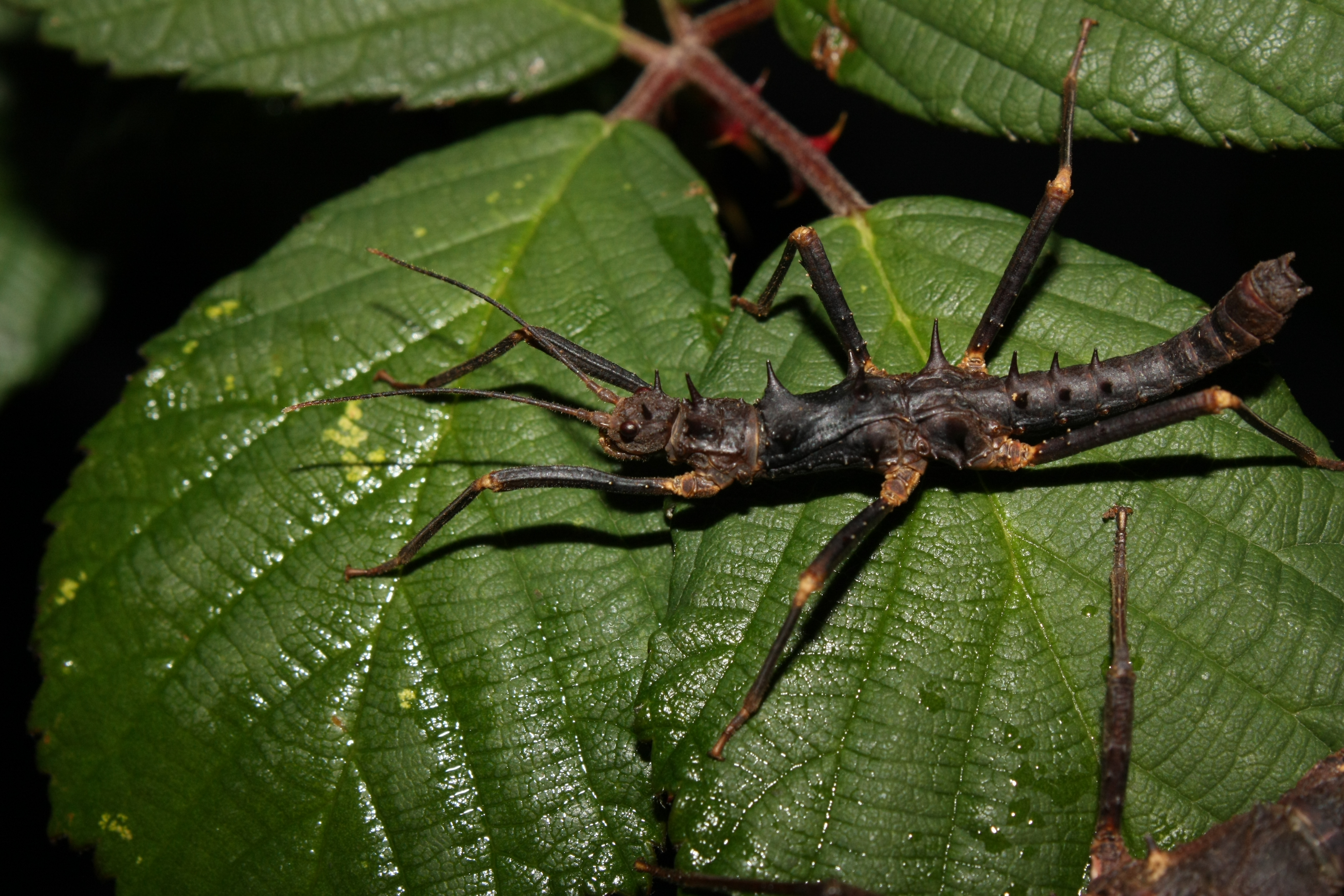
Adult male

Hoploclonia cuspidata is a stick insect species native to the north of Borneo and is also called Brunei Hoploclonia stick insect.

== Taxonomy ==
When Josef Redtenbacher described the species in 1906, both males and females were available to him. However, he only recognized that the female belongs to the genus Hoploclonia established by Carl Stål in 1875. This was until then monotypical. Although both males and females were known from the hitherto only representative of the genus, namely Hoploclonia gecko, Redtenbacher described the male of Hoploclonia cuspidata as Dares (Epidares) haematacanthus. The type material was long thought to be lost. It was rediscovered in 2000 by Oliver Zompro. One lectotype is deposited in the State Museum of Zoology, Dresden and another syntype in the Natural History Museum, Berlin. Philip Edward Bragg first transferred the species to the genus Epidares in 1998. After the type material was available, he synonymized the species with Hoploclonia cuspidata in 2001. The holotype of Hoploclonia cuspidata is a 52 millimetres (2.0 in) long female, which is deposited in the National Museum of Natural History, France.

As early as 1995 Bragg described two other species, namely Hoploclonia apiensis, which so far is only known from the female holotype and Hoploclonia abercrombiei. Both were synonymous with Hoploclonia cuspidata by Francis Seow-Choen in 2016. As early as 2018, a study proved that Hoploclonia abercrombiei is an independent and therefore valid species. Simultaneously with the synonymization, Seow-Choen described Hoploclonia cuspidata crockerensis, a further subspecies in addition to the nominotypical subspecies.

== Description ==
The stick insects, wingless in both sexes, have spines on their bodies that are typical of representatives of this genus. In the 30 to 35 millimetres (1.2 to 1.4 in) long males, these are found in pairs on the head, the thorax and the anterior segments of the thorax. In adult males a dark, mostly black-brown basic color dominates. Only the areas around the coxae, as well as the distal ends of the femurs and the proximal ends of the tibae, i.e. the knee area, are yellow to orange in color and form a clear contrast to the basic color.

The females are 42 to 52 millimetres (1.7 to 2.0 in) long. They are usually lighter in color and significantly more variable in color. Their basic color can vary from light brown to reddish brown to dark brown. Only on the thorax do they have clear, very flat spines, which on the mesothorax form the triangle typical of Hoploclonia species. Overall, they are very robust from the habitus. The abdomen is plump in egg-laying females and approximately cylindrical in cross-section. The end of the abdomen forms a short ovipositor for laying the eggs in the ground.

== Distribution ==
Hoploclonia cuspidata is native to the north of Borneo. Its main distribution area is Brunei, which is why the species with the common name is also called Brunei Hoploclonia stick insect. Further evidence is available for the Malay areas near Brunei. Animals have been found in the west of Sabah and in the northwest of Sarawak. Further evidence is available for the Malay areas near Brunei. Specimens have been found in the west of Sabah and in the northwest of Sarawak.

== Way of life and reproduction ==
In addition to sexual reproduction, facultative parthenogenesis has also been documented in this species. Like most well-camouflaged stick insects, Hoploclonia cuspidata hides during the day and only comes out of the hiding places near the ground at dusk to eat and look for a partner. With their ovipositor, the females prick the eggs 3.5 to 3.7 millimetres (0.14 to 0.15 in) long, 2.8 to 2.9 millimetres (0.11 to 0.11 in) high and 2.5 millimetres (0.098 in) wide into the ground. As is typical for all Hoploclonia species, these are more arched on the dorsal side and therefore have a lid (operculum) that slopes down towards the ventral side. Your micropylar plate has three arms, with one arm pointing towards the lid, while the other two are narrower and run laterally in the direction of the lower pole. The nymphs need three to five months to hatch, depending on the climate, and then have a length of 12 millimetres (0.47 in). They are initially black and have reddish-brown legs. Female nymphs are about 27 millimetres (1.1 in) long in the third stage. Their legs are much more reddish in color and they have no spines whatsoever. It takes at least six months until the moulting to imago occurs, often more for the females.

== In terraristics ==
The first breeding stock appeared in the terraristics in the mid-1990s. These go back to specimens that Ian Abercrombie had collected in 1994 in Brunei, more precisely in Kuala Belalong in the Temburong District. The species was given PSG number 199 by the Phasmid Study Group.

The keeping of Hoploclonia cuspidata is considered to be delicate. Only small terrariums are required. In these there should be a substrate that is always slightly moist and suitable for laying eggs on the terrarium floor. The humidity in the terrarium should also be rather high at 70 to 90 percent. Leaves of brambles, other Rosaceae and oak are eaten.

== Gallery ==
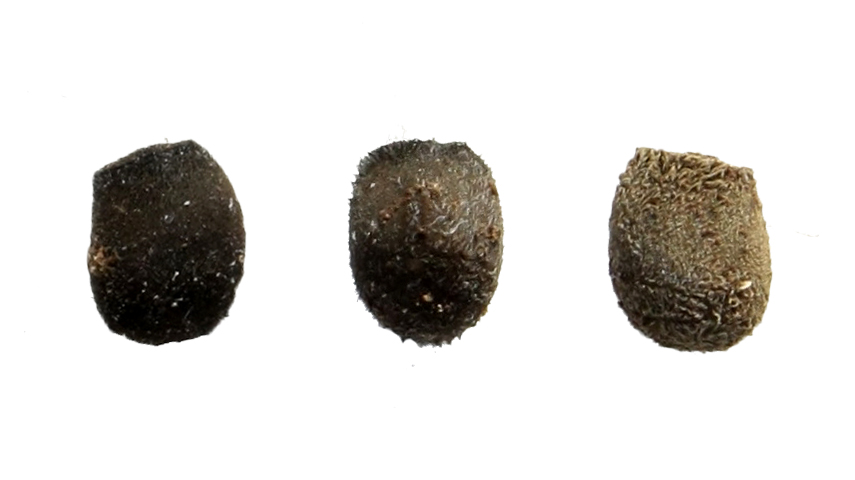
Eggs

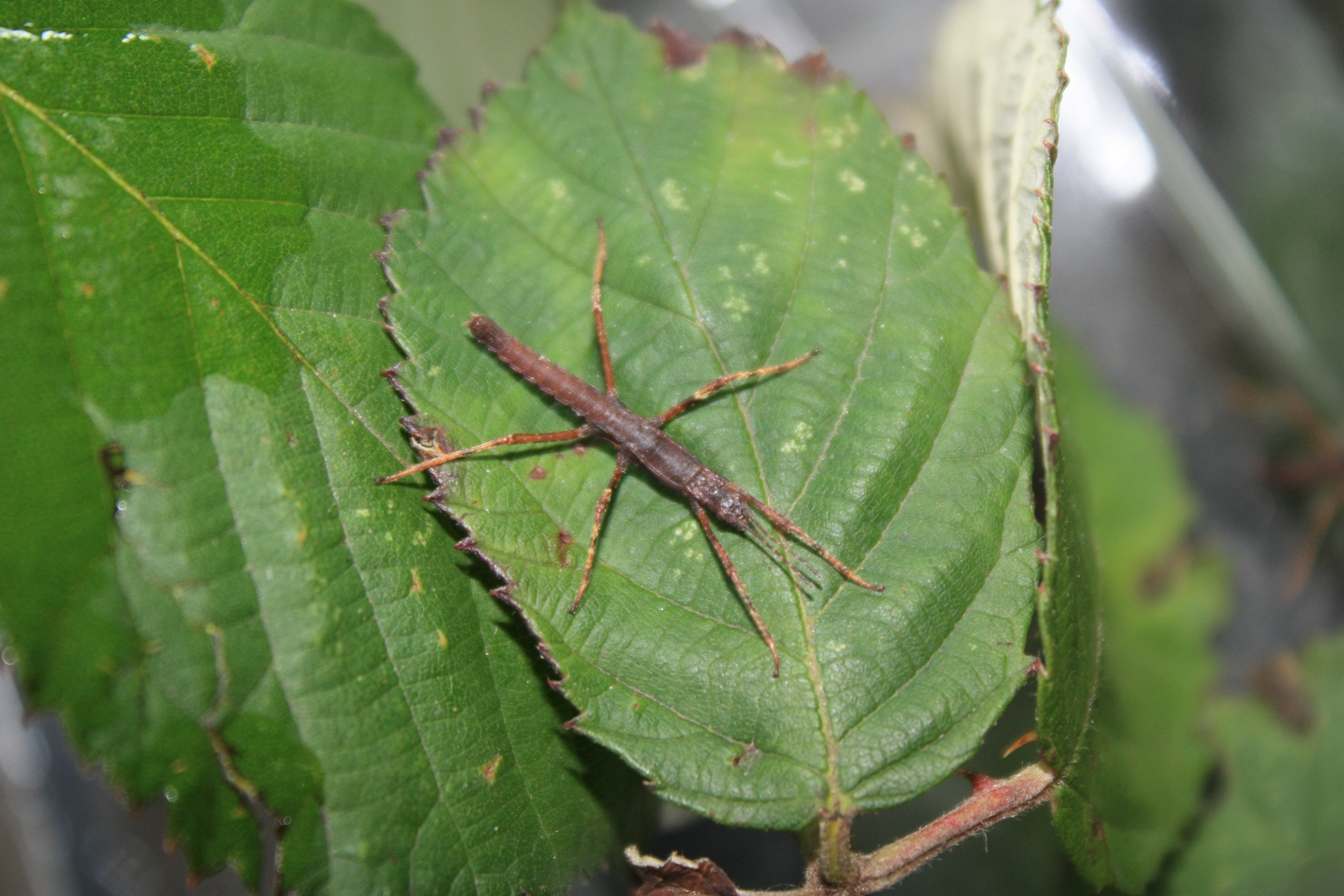
L1 nymphs

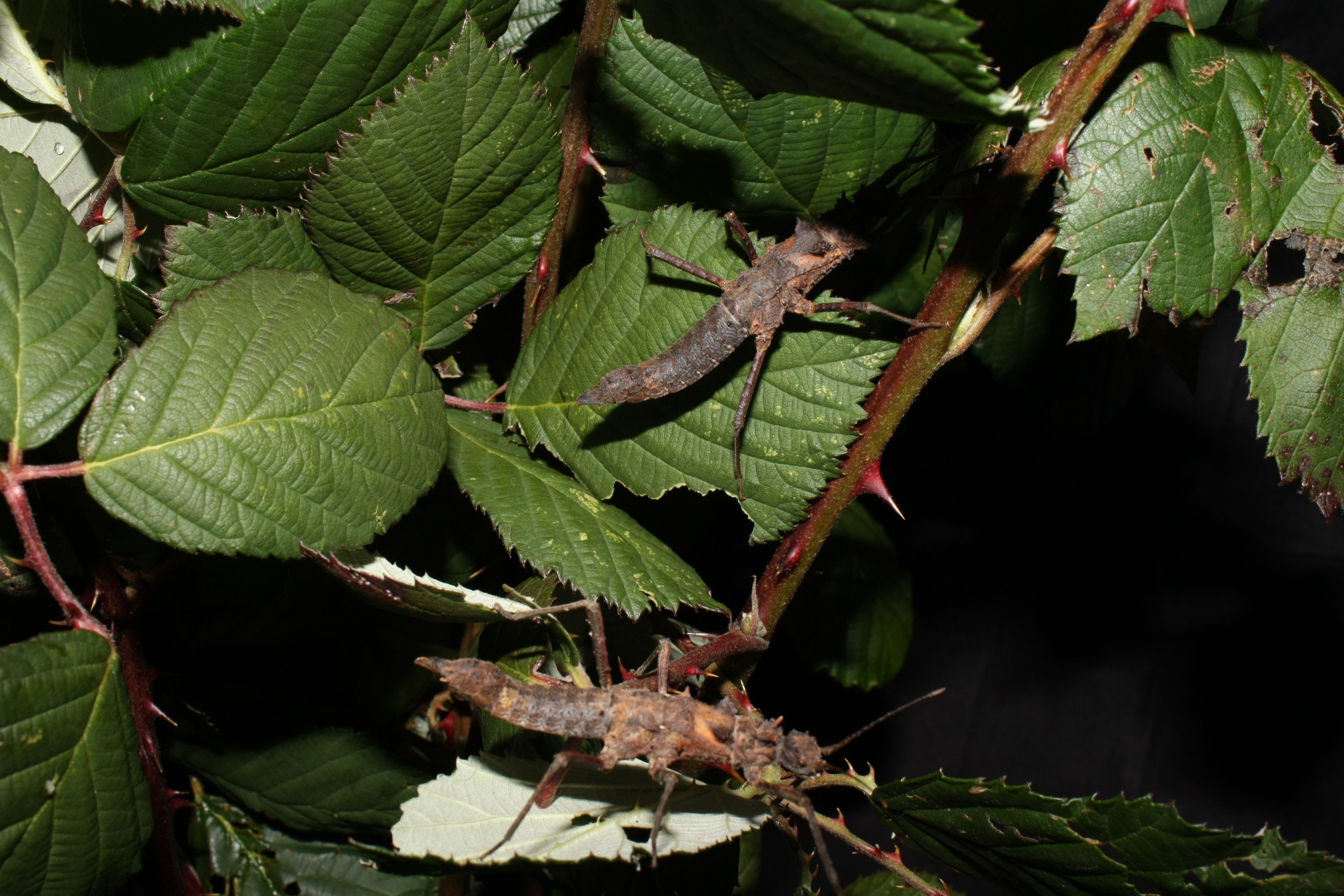
Two different colored females

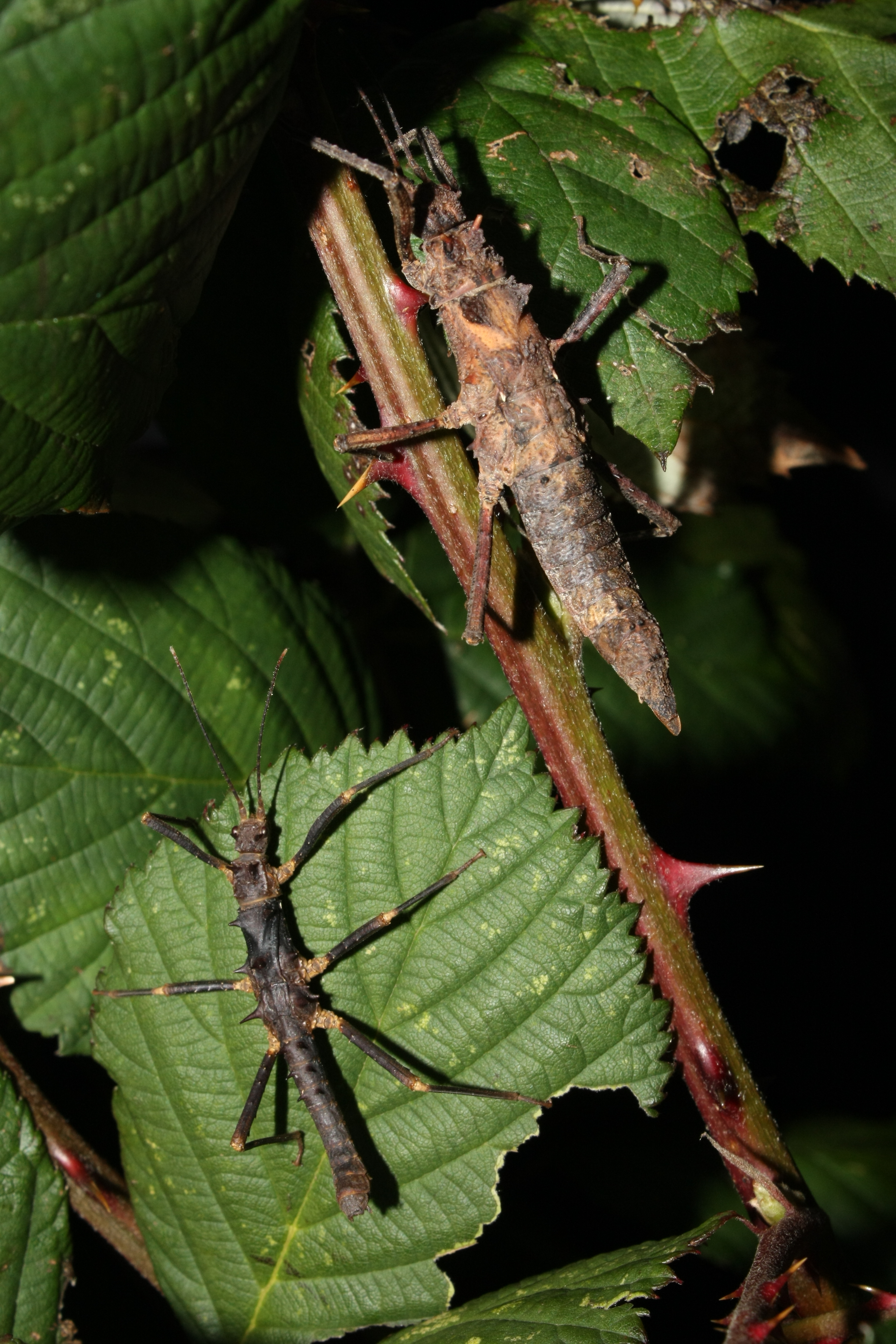
Adult pair, above female
