= Pocdol Mountains =

Volcanic group on the island of Luzon, Philippines

- Bacon-Manito Volcanic Group
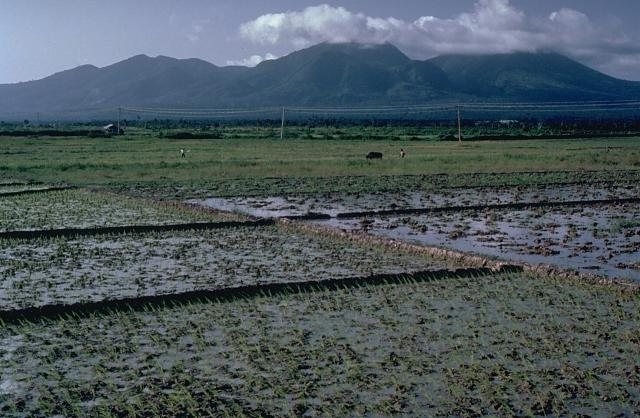

Highest point
- Elevation: 1,102 m (3,615 ft)
- Prominence: 1,049 m (3,442 ft)
- Listing: Inactive volcanoes Ribu
- Coordinates: 13°03′00″N 123°57′29″E

Geography
- Location within Sorsogon Location within Philippines
- Location: Luzon
- Country: Philippines
- Region: Bicol Region
- Provinces: Albay; Sorsogon
- Cities and municipalities: Manito; Sorsogon City

Geology
- Mountain type: Complex volcano
- Volcanic arc: Bicol Volcanic Arc
- Last eruption: Unknown

The Pocdol Mountains, also known as Mount Pocdol, the Pocdol Hills, or the Bacon-Manito Volcanic Group, are a volcanic group of stratovolcanoes in the Philippines, straddling the boundary between the provinces of Albay and Sorsogon.

== Geography ==
The Pocdol Mountains form part of the boundary between the provinces of Albay and Sorsogon, in Region V, on the island of Luzon, in the Philippines. The group is located south-east of Mayon Volcano, between Albay Gulf and Sorsogon Bay, at 13°3'0"N, 123°57'30"E. The mountains have a triangular footprint of about 225 km^{2} (87 sq mi). There are several peaks above 1,000 m in elevation. The highest point is reported to be 1,102 m (3,615 ft) above sea level.

=== Geology ===
The volcanic cones in the western part of the complex are dissected, but those in the eastern part are morphologically youthful. The group is described by the Smithsonian Institution's Global Volcanism Program as fumarolic. A fumarole field that contains solfataras and chloride hot springs, is reported to be located near the summit of the volcanic group.

Several Pleistocene K-Ar dates have been obtained from the volcanic complex. Most igneous rocks in the Pocdol Mountains consist of pyroxene andesites with minor amounts of dacite and basalts. The area is traversed by the San Vicente-Linao Fault, a splay of the Philippine Fault.

=== Environment ===
The mountains have been designated an Important Bird Area (IBA) by BirdLife International because they support significant populations of cream-bellied fruit-doves, Philippine cockatoos and white-fronted tits. Habitat is mainly lowland forest, much of which has been previously logged, with some patches of montane forest around the highest peaks.

== Listings ==
- The Global Volcanism Program lists the Pocdol Mountains as Fumarolic.
- Philippine Institute of Volcanology and Seismology (PHIVOLCS) lists Pocdol Mountains as Inactive.

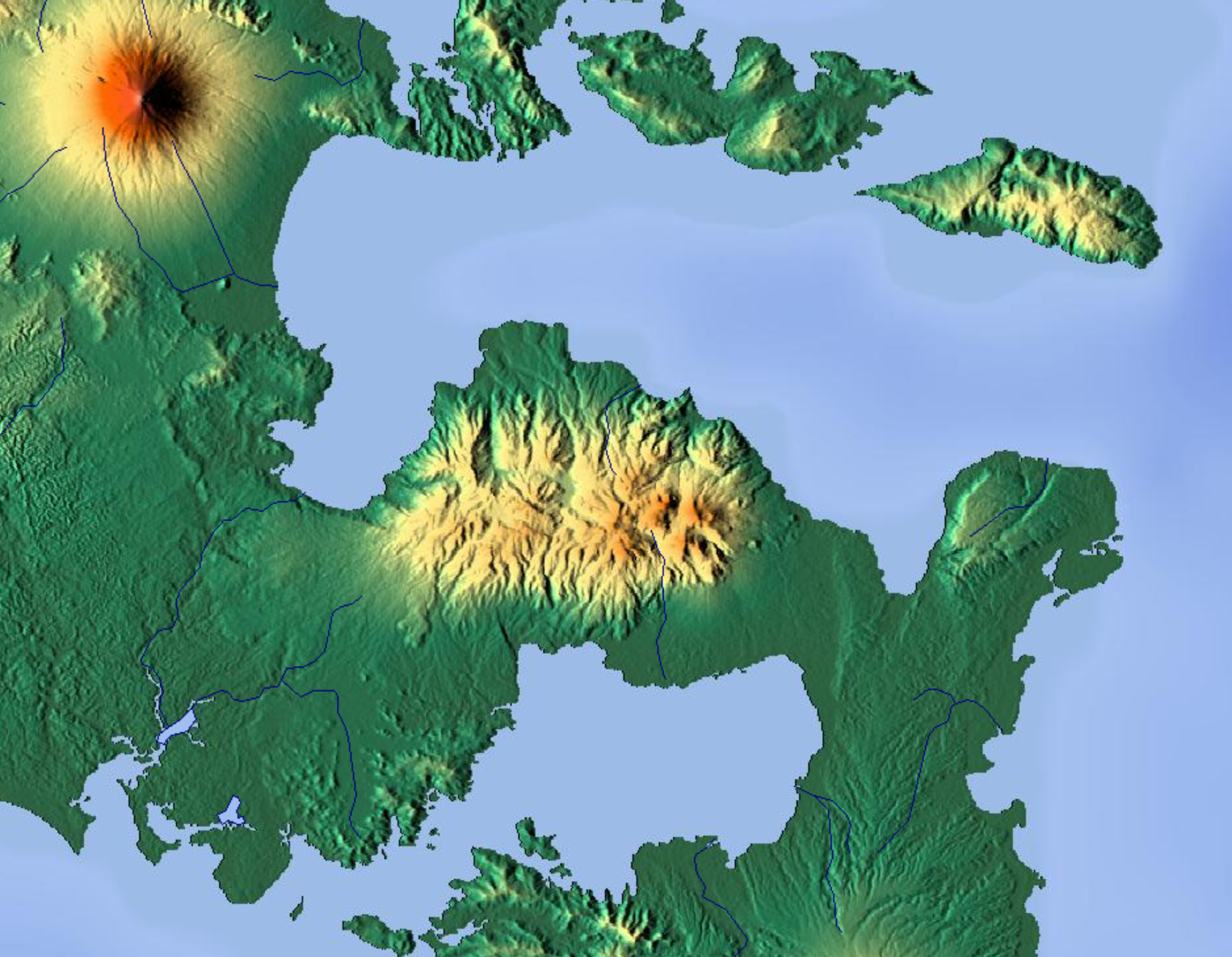
Elevation map of Pocdol Mountains and surrounding areas on the Bicol peninsula of Luzon Island

== See also ==
- List of active volcanoes in the Philippines
- List of potentially active volcanoes in the Philippines
- List of inactive volcanoes in the Philippines
- Philippine Institute of Volcanology and Seismology
- Pacific ring of fire
- Volcanic group
