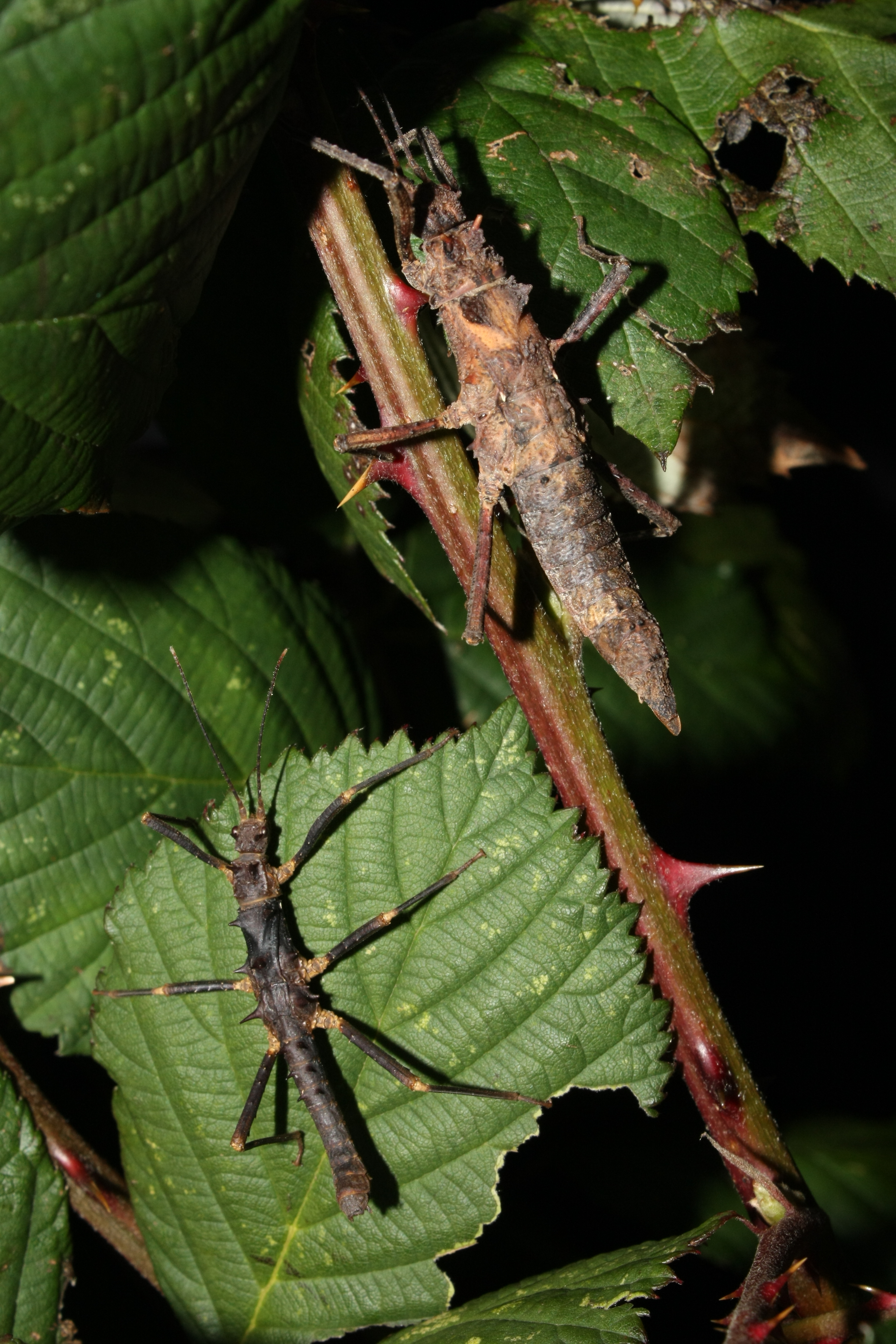
- Hoploclonia cuspidata, pair

Scientific classification
- Kingdom: Animalia
- Phylum: Arthropoda
- Clade: Pancrustacea
- Class: Insecta
- Order: Phasmatodea
- Family: Heteropterygidae
- Subfamily: Obriminae
- Tribe: Hoplocloniini; Bank et al, 2021
- Genus: Hoploclonia; Stål, 1875

Type species
- Hoploclonia gecko (Westwood, 1875)

Species
- Hoploclonia abercrombiei; Hoploclonia cuspidata; Hoploclonia gecko

= Hoploclonia =

Tribe of stick insects

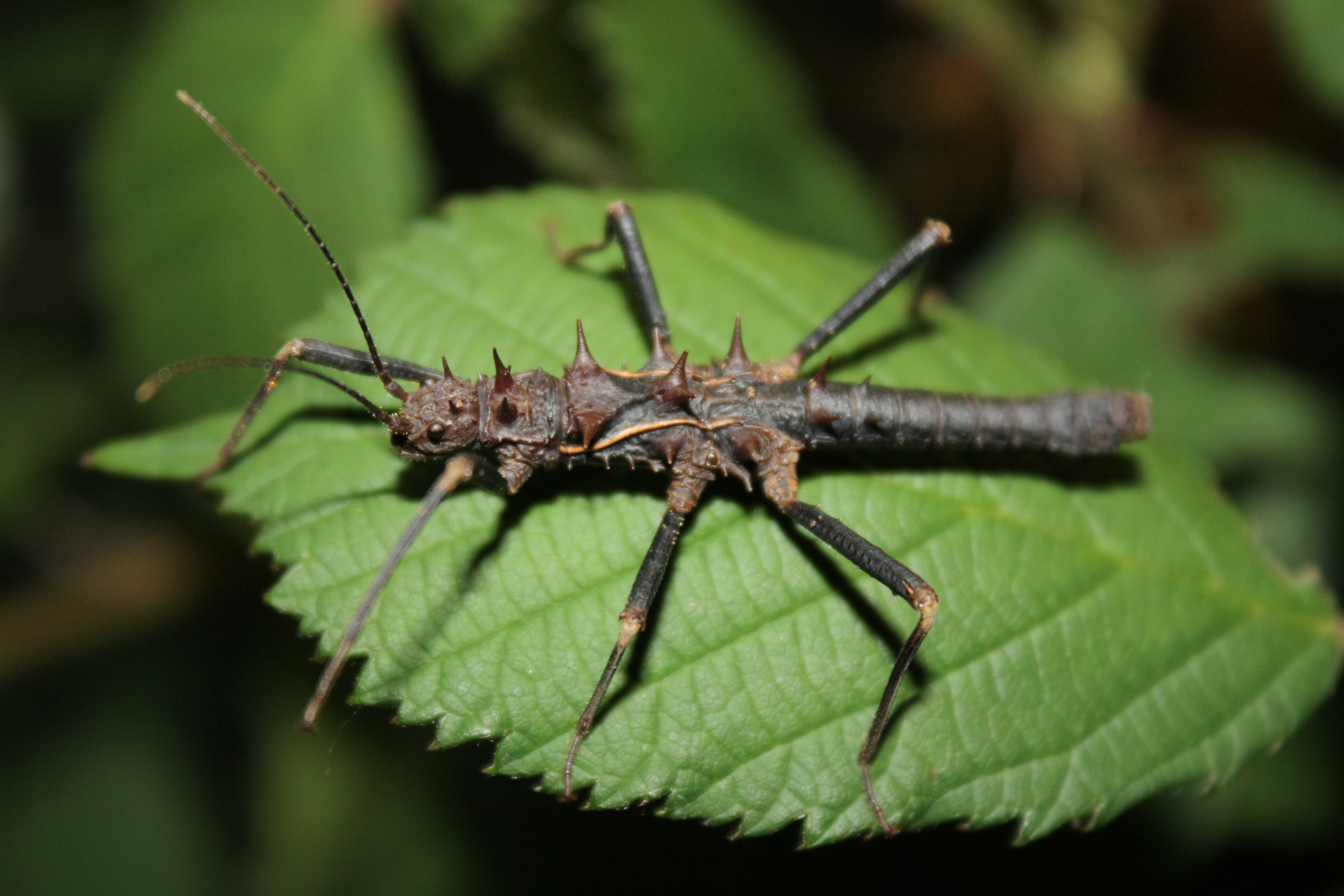
Hoploclonia abercrombiei, male

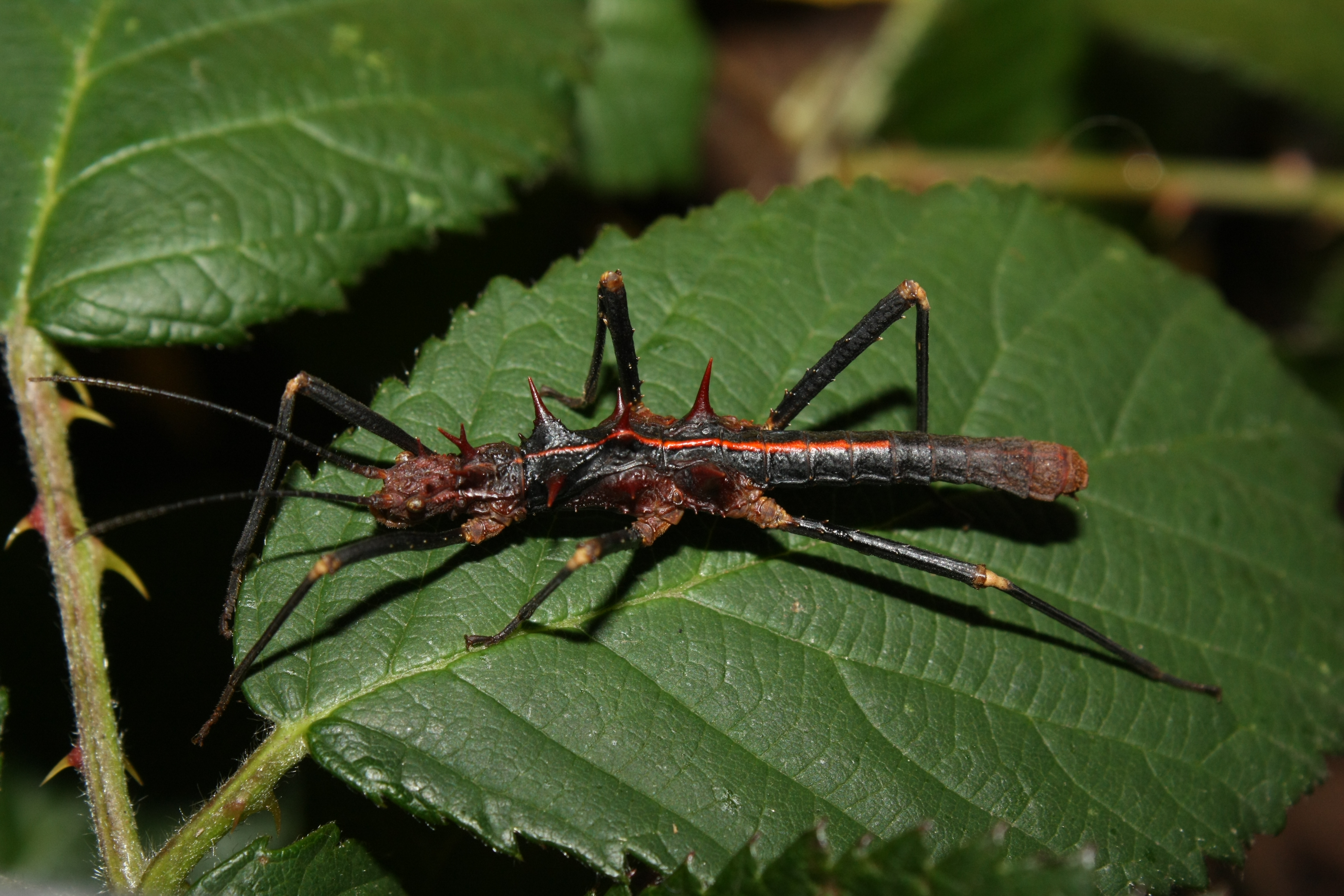
Hoploclonia gecko, male

- Hoplocloniini
  - Hoploclonia gecko
  - - Hoploclonia spec. 'Mt. Pagon'
    - - Hoploclonia cuspidata
      - Hoploclonia abercrombiei

Relationships of the examined Hoploclonia species by Sarah Bank et al. (2021)

Hoploclonia is the only genus of the tribe Hoplocloniini and brings together relatively small and darkly coloured Phasmatodea species.

== Characteristics ==
The representatives of this genus are very small with 35 to 40 mm in the male and 45 to 55 mm in the female sex. Both sexes are always wingless and very thorny. The thorns form a characteristic triangle on the mesothorax. At the front two corner points are created by a pair of widely spaced and, in the females, very flat thorns. While these converge at the front transversely to the body axis and thus form one side of the triangle, the third corner point and the other two sides are created by the thorn edges that taper off flat towards the rear. In this area the males still have a distinct, very close pair of thorns. They are dominated by dark brown, almost black tones, which are complemented by yellow-orange species-specific drawings. The mostly lighter females are less prickly and much more variable in color. Their basic color can vary from light brown to reddish brown to dark brown. As is typical for the representatives of the Obriminae, at the end of the abdomen they have a rather short secondary ovipositor for laying eggs in the ground. This surrounds the actual ovipositor. It is ventrally formed from the eighth sternite, here named subgenital plate or operculum. Dorsally it is not formed from the eleventh tergum (epiproct), as in the representatives of the Heteropteryginae and Obrimini, but from the tenth tergum. This characteristic is considered autapomorphic for the tribe Hoplocloniini.

== Way of life and reproduction ==
The nocturnal insects hide on the ground or in low vegetation during the day. Even at night, they do not climb particularly high to eat. The eggs are laid in the ground by the females with the ovipositor. They are 3.5 to 4.0 mm long and 2.5 to 3.0 mm wide and have a bulging, protruding dorsal area, as well as a lid (operculum) that slopes downwards towards the ventral side. The nymphs hatch after 3 to 8 months and need more than half a year to become adult.

== Taxonomy ==
=== Systematic background ===
The genus is assigned to the subfamily Obriminae, where it has been included in the Eubulidini tribe since 2004. Since this was drafted in 2016, it has been included in the Tisamenini tribe. After this was also with the Obrimini synonymized in 2021, the genus was granted its own tribe due to its already mentioned exception regarding the morphology of the secondary ovipositor. Since this ovipositor is formed dorsally from the eleventh tergum in the Obrimini and the Heteropteryginae, whereas in the case of Hoploclonia it is formed from the tenth tergum, it must have developed independently three times within the Heteropterygidae. This peculiarity of the genus Hoploclonia was already described in 1906. Younger genetic analysis based investigations confirm the phylogenetic special position of the genus within the subfamily.

=== Internal systematics ===
In 1875 Carl Stål established the genus Hoploclonia. In this he placed a species already described by John Obadiah Westwood as Acanthoderus gecko in 1859, which thus became the type species of the genus. Josef Redtenbacher described in 1906 with Hoploclonia cuspidata a second species based on a female. In the same work he described the male of this species as Dares haematacanthus.

James Abram Garfield Rehn and his son John William Holman Rehn described eight more Hoploclonia species in 1939 and assigned some Tisamenus species to the genus Hoploclonia. However, all newly assigned and newly described species later turned out to be representatives of the genus Tisamenus. It was not until 1994 that Philip Edward Bragg found two more Hoploclonia species: Hoploclonia abercrombiei and Hoploclonia apiensis. He also describes two unassignable males that he found in 1995. One was found outside the Niah Cave in Sarawak. It is similar in proportions and thorns to the Hoploclonia abercrombiei, which is also native there, but has thorns on the pronotum that resemble those of Hoploclonia gecko. It also has a single spine on the left side of the fourth abdominal segment, where otherwise only Hoploclonia cuspidata has a complete pair of spines. Bragg thinks it is a variation of Hoploclonia abercrombiei or possibly a hybrid. The second male is a nymph who has a pair of spines on the second abdominal segment, so more than Hoploclonia gecko, but less than the other two species.

In 2016 Francis Seow-Choen synonymized both Hoploclonia apiensis and Hoploclonia abercrombiei with Hoploclonia cuspidata and established a second subspecies for this species. To justify the synonymization, the variability of the spines, especially those on the abdomen, is pointed out, which makes the acanthotaxy (taxonomic delimitation on the basis of the spines) appear unsuitable as a species characteristic. As early as 2018, Robertson et al proved that Hoploclonia abercrombiei is an independent species. Sarah Bank et al show in their investigations that there is a fourth, as yet undescribed species, which was found at Mount Pagon in Brunei.

Valid and described species are:

- Hoploclonia abercrombiei Bragg, 1995 (males with two curved yellow marginal stripes on the thorax and two pairs of spines on the frontal abdomen)
- Hoploclonia cuspidata Redtenbacher, 1906 (males only in the coxae and knee area yellowish and with three pairs of thorns on the frontal abdomen)
- Hoploclonia gecko (Westwood, 1859) (males with yellow-orange to red longitudinal stitch and without spines on the frontal abdomen) type species (as Acanthoderus gecko Westwood)

== Rearing ==
All three so far described and valid species are or were present in the terrariums of enthusiasts. The first species introduced in 1987 was Hoploclonia gecko by Philip Bragg, which was given the PSG number 110 by the Phasmid Study Group. Also imported by Bragg and Ian Abercrombie in 1994 was a species later described by Bragg as Hoploclonia abercrombiei. For this, the PSG number 165 was assigned. Hoploclonia cuspidata introduced by Ian Abercrombie in 1994 can be found under PSG number 199.
All species only need small terrariums with high humidity and a substrate to lay their eggs. They are easy to feed on leaves of bramble (blackberries) or oak, but are considered difficult to keep or to breed.
