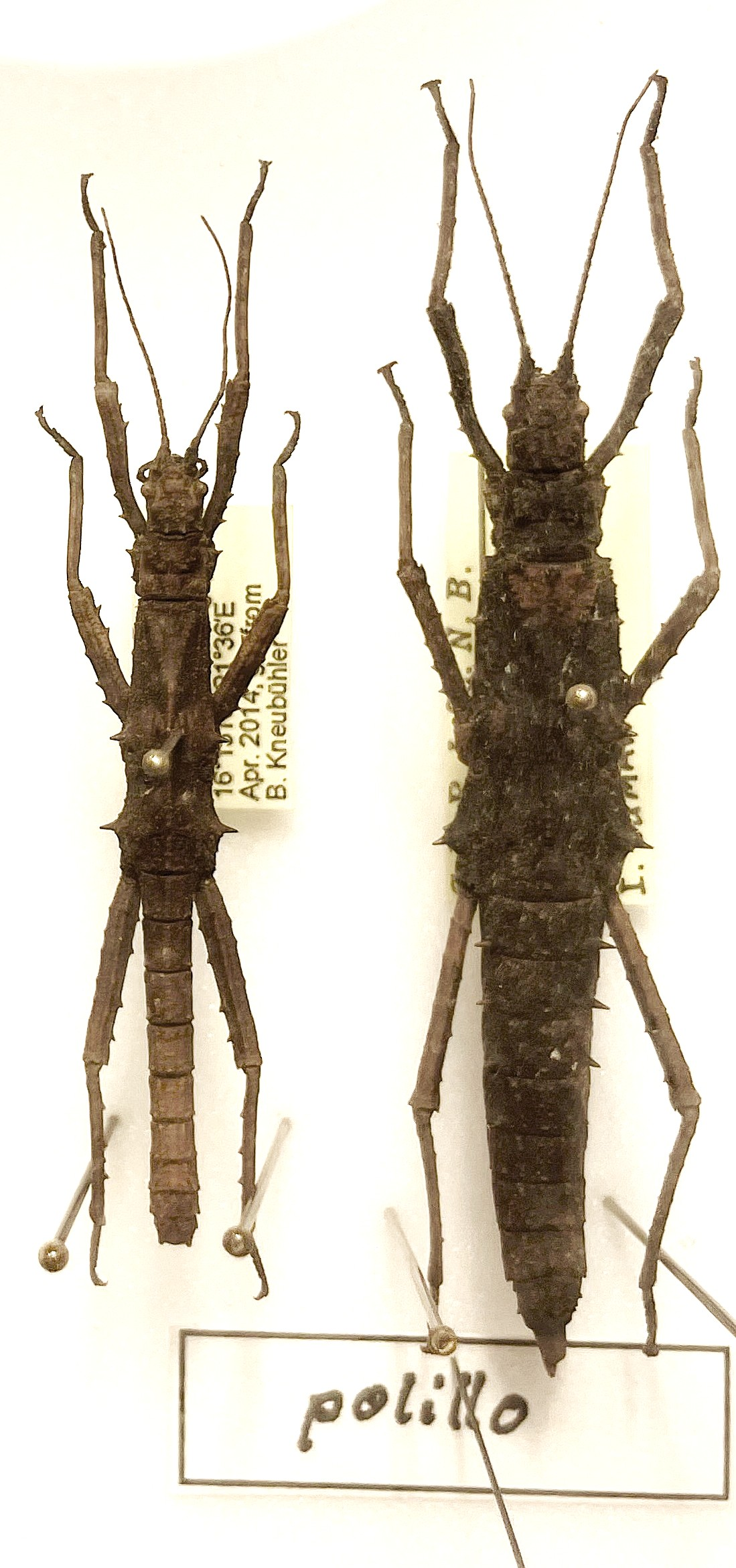
- Tisamenus polillo, pair from the collection of RBINS

Scientific classification
- Kingdom: Animalia
- Phylum: Arthropoda
- Clade: Pancrustacea
- Class: Insecta
- Order: Phasmatodea
- Family: Heteropterygidae
- Subfamily: Obriminae
- Tribe: Obrimini
- Genus: Tisamenus
- Species: T. polillo

Binomial name
- Tisamenus polillo (Rehn, J.A.G. & Rehn, J.W.H., 1939)

Synonyms
- Hoploclonia polillo Rehn, J.A.G. & Rehn, J.W.H., 1939

= Tisamenus polillo =

Species of stick insect

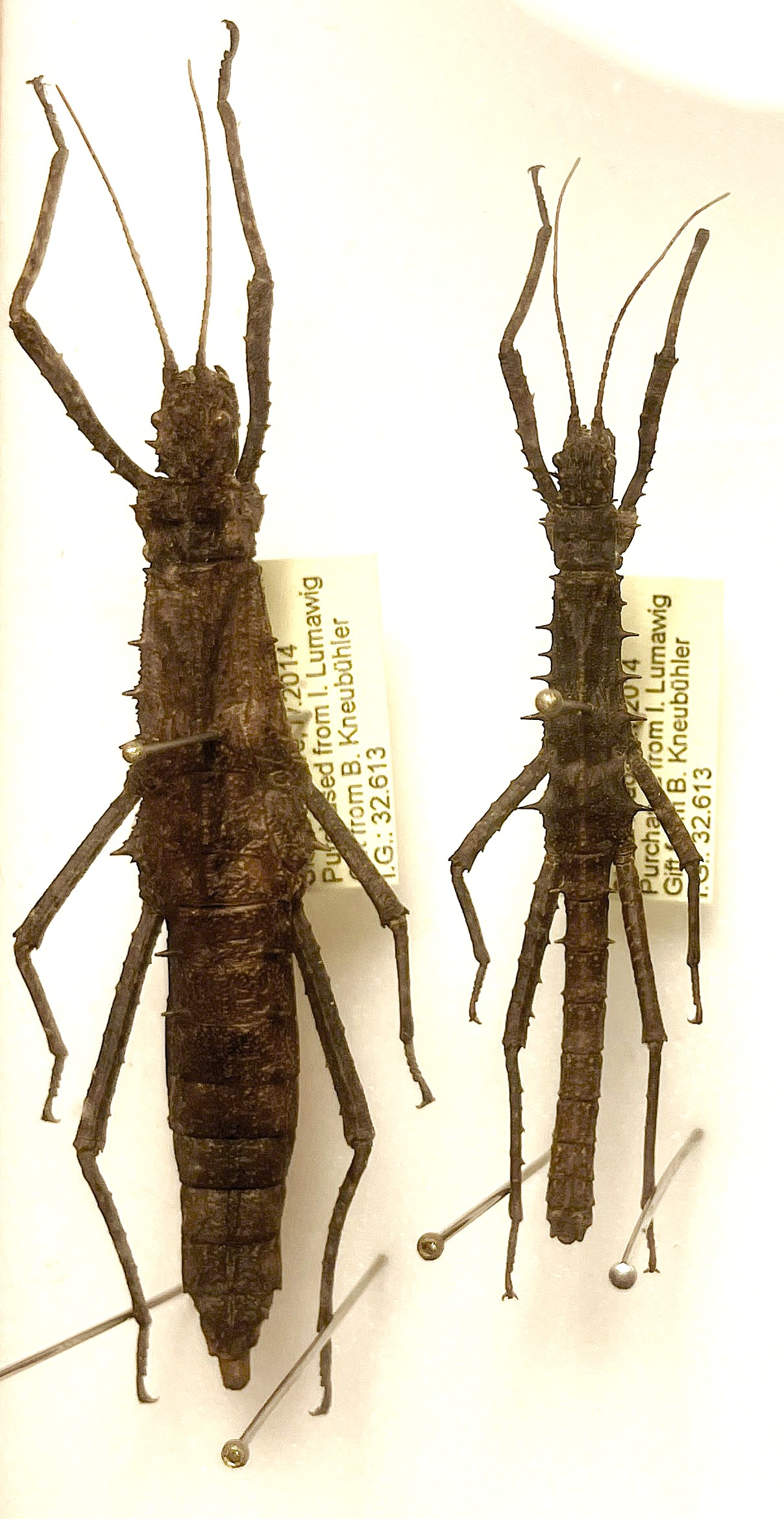
The second pair from the RBINS, with a significantly spikier male

Tisamenus polillo is a species of stick insect in the family Heteropterygidae native to the Philippine islands of Luzon and Polillo.

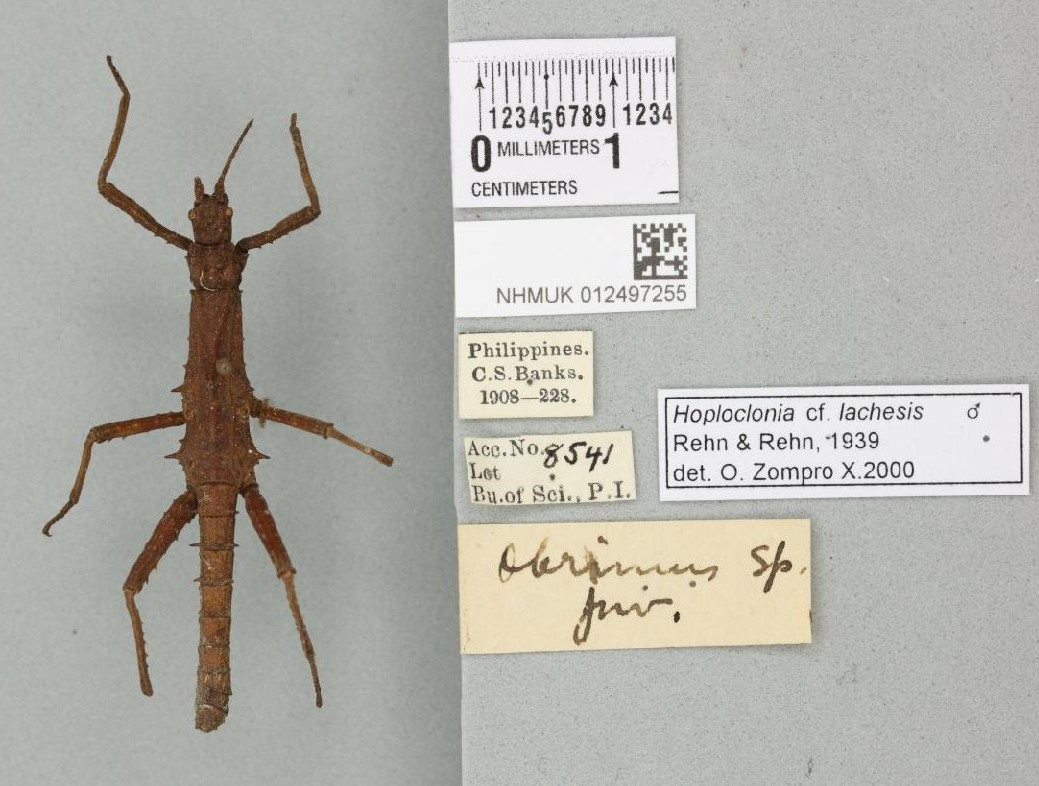
Male of Tisamenus polillo from the NHMUK, which was initially assigned to other species

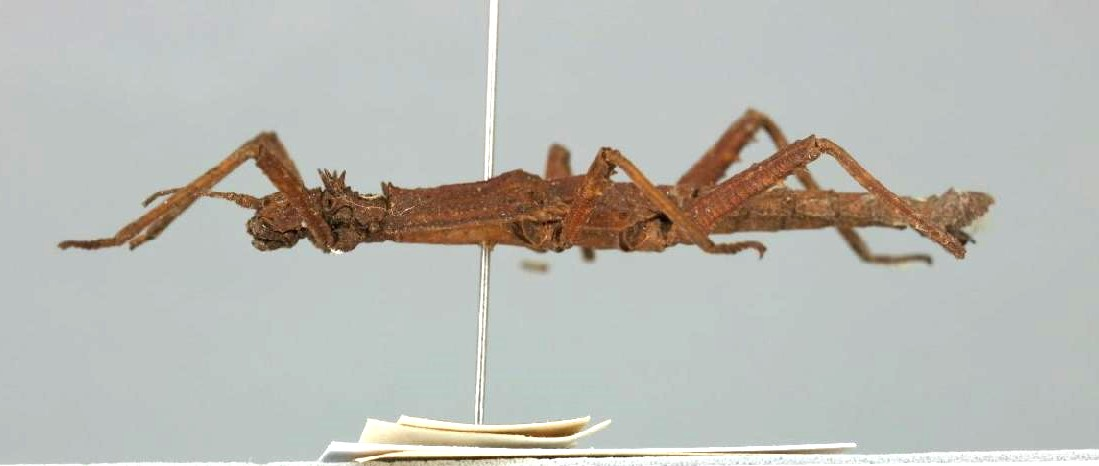
The male from NHMUK laterally

== Description ==
Tisamenus polillo is a medium-sized, slender, and sparsely spined Tisamenus species. Females grow to 54.5 to 58 millimetres (2.15 to 2.28 in) in length. Their mesothorax has three more or less prominent mesopleural spines, while females of the morphologically similar, but larger species Tisamenus draconinus and Tisamenus napalaki have four, and Tisamenus lachesis has five. The anterior of the three spines is only moderately sharp. The metathorax has a distinct metapleural spine, above which is a much smaller tubercle or spine seat. The edges of the triangle on the mesonotum, typical of the genus, are raised and spineless in both sexes. Small, paired spines are found on terga two to four of the abdomen. In the females of the smaller Tisamenus charestae, only small tubercles are visible here. Furthermore, the supracoxal spines of the mesopleurae and metapleurae are developed as short, conical tubercles rather than as spines like in the females of Tisamenus polillo. The lower part of the ovipositor, known as the subgenital plate, projects only slightly beyond the upper part, the epiproct, in Tisamenus polillo, while in Tisamenus charestae it exceeds it by more than half its length.

Males of Tisamenus polillo reach a length of 42.0 to 44.8 millimetres (1.65 to 1.76 in). They are slimmer than males of Tisamenus lachesis. While these males always have five mesopleural spines, males of Tisamenus polillo have a maximum of four such spines, which may be reduced to the posterior supracoxal spine located at the level of the midlegs. The pronounced metapleural spine, also present in females, is found on the metathorax. They differ from the equally slender males of the smaller Tisamenus kalahani in their more pronounced head and body structures. For example, males of Tisamenus polillo have large, spiny supraorbital spines on their heads and prominent two- or three-spined anterior spines on the pronotum (pronotale), while those of Tisamenus kalahani have one spine. The spiny mesopleural and metapleural spines prominent in Tisamenus polillo are recognizable only as conical tubercles in Tisamenus kalahani. The anterior angles of the triangle on the mesonotum are spineless in Tisamenus kalahani, whereas they bear spines in Tisamenus polillo. On terga two and three of the abdomen, Tisamenus polillo has small, paired spines, which are missing in Tisamenus kalahani.

The eggs of Tisamenus polillo are 3.5 millimetres (0.14 in) long, 2.3 millimetres (0.091 in) wide, and 2.8 millimetres (0.11 in) high. They are similar in shape to those of Tisamenus draconinus, but not as wide. The micropylar plate, at 2.9 millimetres (0.11 in) long, reaches about three-quarters of the capsule length. Its three processes are relatively broad and, as is typical for the genus, form an upside-down Y.

== Distribution ==
The holotype comes from Polillo Island, off the southeast coast of Luzon. All other localities are in northern and central Luzon. The species has so far been found in the provinces of Quirino, Aurora, Laguna, and Kalinga.

== Taxonomy ==
James Abram Garfield Rehn and his son John William Holman Rehn described the species in 1939 as Hoploclonia polillo. The description is based on a male holotype, which was collected by Taylor on the eponymous island of Polillo and came from the collection of Morgan Hebard. It is deposited in the National Museum of Natural History in Washington, D.C. Rehn and Rehn divided the Philippine species they listed or described in Hoploclonia into different groups according to morphological aspects. While they placed several species in the Draconina, Serratoria, and Deplanta groups, they assigned only the eponymous species to the Polillo group. Ireno L. Lit jr. and Orlando L. Eusebio described two equally weakly spined species, Tisamenus kalahani and Tisamenus summaleonilae, in 2005, which they assigned to this group. Until 2004, Tisamenus polillo was listed in Hoploclonia. It was only Oliver Zompro who placed the species, together with all other Philippine representatives, in the genus Tisamenus. The females and the eggs were described in 2025 by Frank H. Hennemann. Of the four males examined, three females and one egg removed from the ovipositor, two pairs collected at different locations in 2014 came from the Museum of Natural Sciences in Brussels and one male collected in 2004, as well as a female collected in 2012 and the egg removed from it came from Hennemann's specimen collection. Another male, already collected in 1908 by C.S. Banks, from the Natural History Museum, London was also assigned to Tisamenus polillo by Hennemann. It was originally labeled Obrimus sp. juv. and was determined by Zompro in 2000 as Hoploclonia cf. lachesis.
