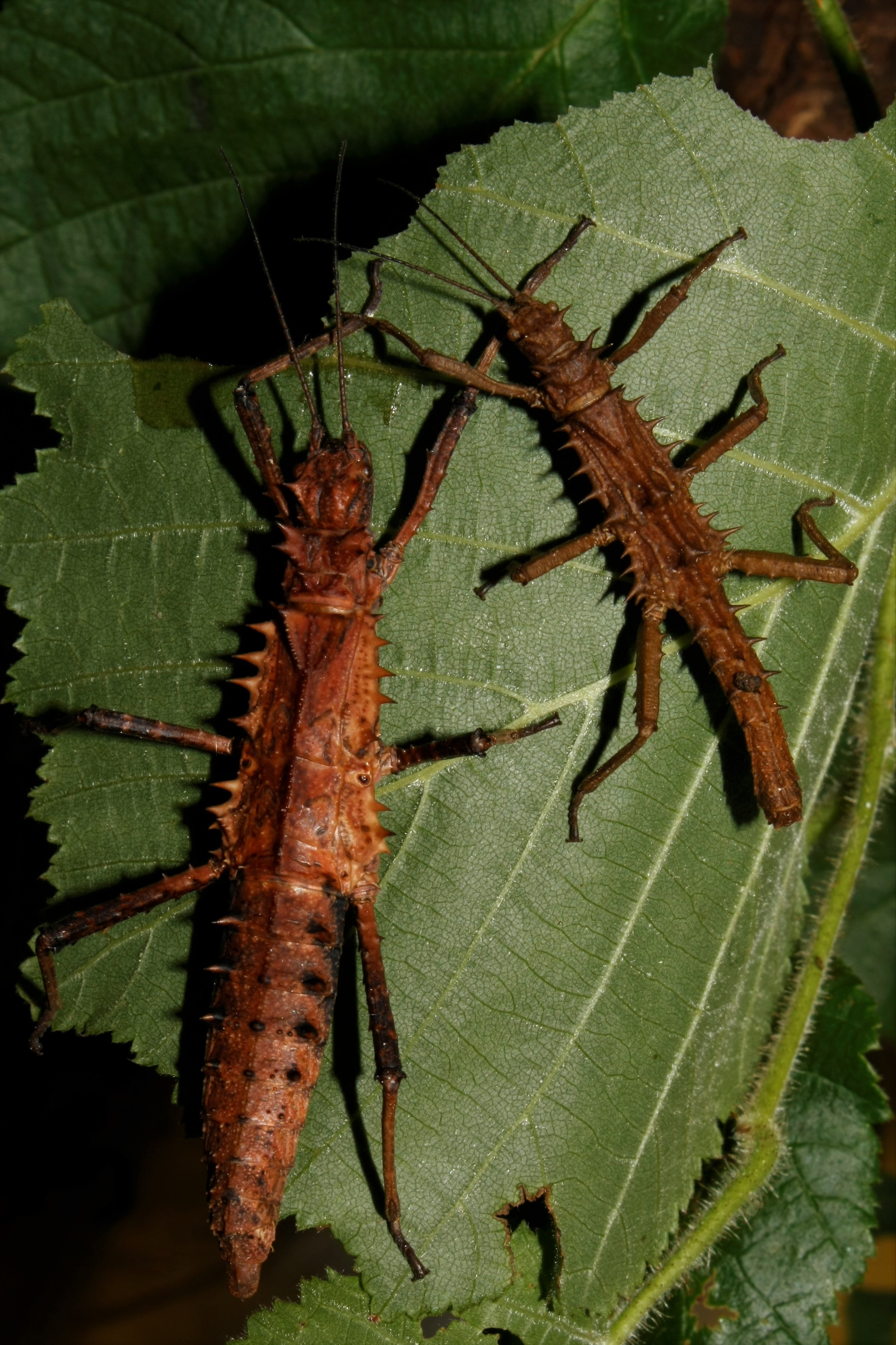
- Tisamenus hystrix 'Sibuyan', left female, right male

Scientific classification
- Kingdom: Animalia
- Phylum: Arthropoda
- Clade: Pancrustacea
- Class: Insecta
- Order: Phasmatodea
- Family: Heteropterygidae
- Subfamily: Obriminae
- Tribe: Obrimini
- Genus: Tisamenus
- Species: T. hystrix

Binomial name
- Tisamenus hystrix (Rehn & Rehn, 1939)

Synonyms
- Hoploclonia hystrix Rehn & Rehn, 1939

= Tisamenus hystrix =

Species of stick insect

Tisamenus hystrix is a stick insect species (Phasmatodea), in the family of the Heteropterygidae endemic to the Philippines.

== Description ==
With a length of 34 to 37 millimetres (1.3 to 1.5 in) in males and 46 to 49 millimetres (1.8 to 1.9 in) in length in females, the species is considered to be a rather small and spiny representative of the genus Tisamenus. As with Tisamenus draconina and Tisamenus lachesis there are distinct, often sharp, spines on the posterior mesonotum (posterior mesonatals) and also in the middle of the metanotum (median metanotales). The triangle on the mesonotum typical of the genus is about as wide as it is long in Tisamenus hystrix, while it is longer in Tisamenus lachesis. In both species the anterior corners of the triangle end in single spines, while in Tisamenus draconina they end in compound spines. The segments two to five of the abdomen are occupied in the posterior area with central and paired lateral spines.

== Taxonomy ==
James Abram Garfield Rehn and his son John William Holman Rehn described the species in 1939 as Hoploclonia hystrix. The species name "hystrix" was chosen based on the genus Hystrix, genus of porcupiness, and refers to the spiny body surface of the animals. The male holotype is deposited at the National Museum of Natural History in Washington, D.C. In addition to this type, Rehn and Rehn examined and described a juvenile female, which was designated as an allotype, and another male. Both are now considered paratypes and, like the holotype, were collected by Baker in Sibulan in southern Negros. Further information such as the collection time is missing. All three types are in the National Museum of Natural History in Washington D.C. deposited. Rehn and Rehn divided the Philippine representatives they led or described in Hoploclonia according to morphological aspects into different groups. In the so-called Draconina group they placed Hoploclonia draconina (today Tisamenus draconina), Hoploclonia hystrix and also newly described by them Hoploclonia lachesis (today Tisamenus lachesis). All very strongly spined, rather elongated and long-legged species. Until 2004 Tisamenus hystrix was included in Hoploclonia. Only Oliver Zompro placed the species together with all other Philippine representatives of Hoploclonia in the genus Tisamenus.

== Distribution area ==
While the specimens examined by Rehn and Rehn are said to have come from Sibulan in the Province of Negros Oriental in the south of Negros, more recent finds are located about 350 kilometres (220 mi) further north on Sibuyan Island. According to the current state of knowledge, the distribution area thus includes larger areas of the central part of the Philippine island archipelago.

== Rediscovery and terraristics ==
After many decades only the type material of the species examined by Rehn and Rehn was known, Albert Kang collected animals on Sibuyan on June 3, 2014, which were initially named as Tisamenus sp. 'Sibuyan' and their offspring were distributed under this name. It was not until 2023 that Frank H. Hennemann identified this as Tisamenus hystrix. It is the smallest species of the genus Tisamenus that have been successfully introduced into terraristics, with the stock now had to be named as Tiasmaenus hystrix 'Sibuyan' is the least common in terraristics. The species is not as productive as the other breeding stocks of Tisamenus, but like them it can be fed with forage plants such as bramble and hazel.
