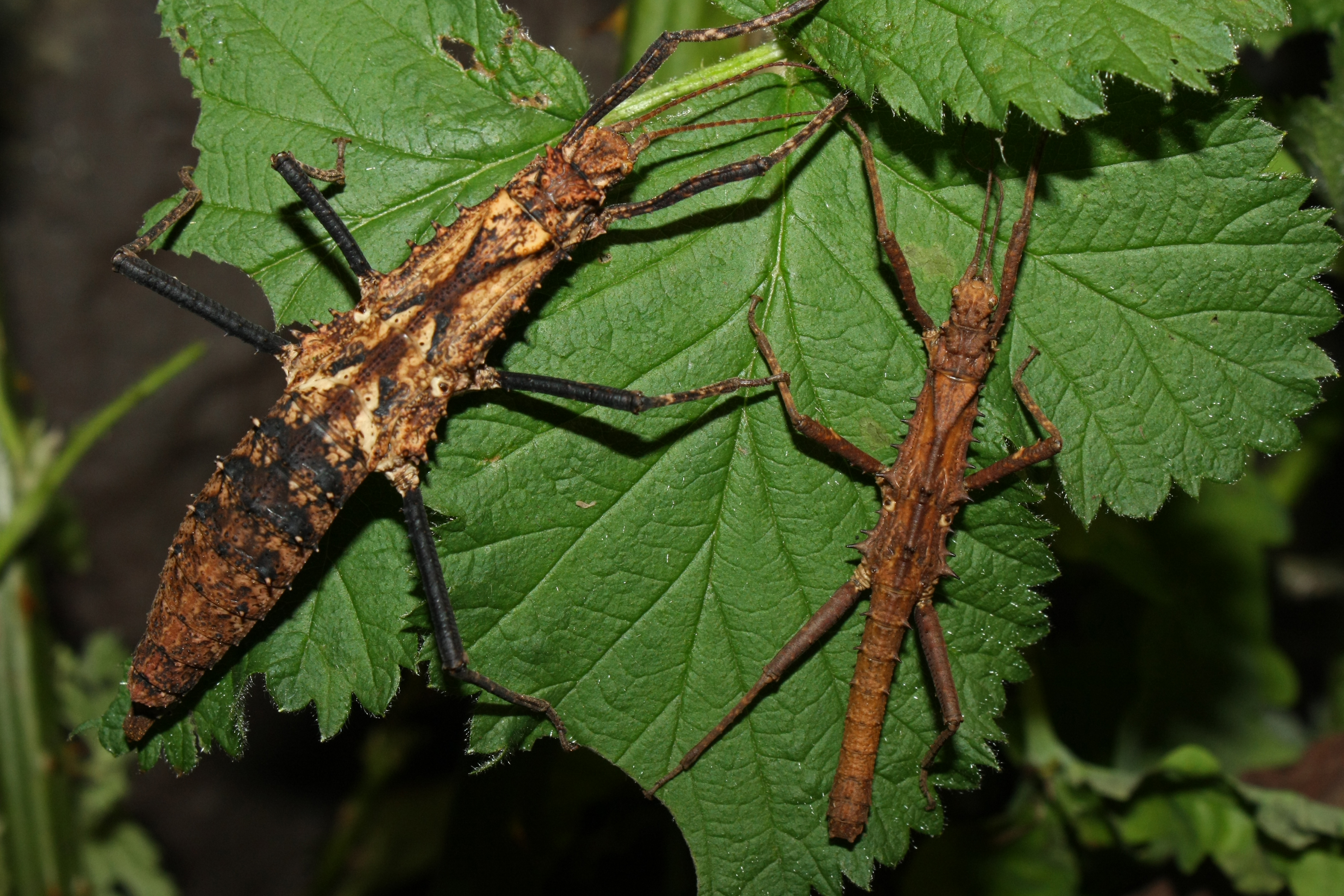
- Tisamenus lachesis 'Sierra Madre', left female, right male

Scientific classification
- Kingdom: Animalia
- Phylum: Arthropoda
- Clade: Pancrustacea
- Class: Insecta
- Order: Phasmatodea
- Family: Heteropterygidae
- Genus: Tisamenus
- Species: T. lachesis

Binomial name
- Tisamenus lachesis (Rehn & Rehn, 1939)

Synonyms
- Hoploclonia lachesis Rehn & Rehn, 1939

= Tisamenus lachesis =

Species of stick insect

Tisamenus lachesis is a stick insect species (Phasmatodea), in the family of the Heteropterygidae endemic to the Philippine islands Luzon, Samar and Polillo.

== Description ==
For a long time, only males were known of this Tisamenus species. Like Tisamenus draconinus and Tisamenus hystrix, it is relatively spiny. As with these, there are distinct, relatively sharp spines on the posterior mesonotum (posterior mesonatals) and smaller, blunter ones in the middle of the metanotum (median metanotals). The triangle on the mesonotum typical of the genus is significantly longer than it is wide at the front in Tisamenus lachesis, while it is as wide as it is long in Tisamenus hystrix. In both species the anterior corners of the triangle end in single spines, while in Tisamenus draconinus they end in compound spines.

The species is considered to be very variable. The males grow to about 4.15 to 5.1 centimetres (1.63 to 2.01 in) long and are initially reddish-brown in color with little patterning, which becomes darker with age. On the head there is a pair of spines pointing upwards. On the pronotum there are three pairs of distinct spines arranged in a group that runs diagonally outwards. On the sides of the elongated mesothorax there are five distinct spines each, and on its upper side there is an isosceles triangle formed by raised edges. The base of this triangle is attached to the front edge of the mesonotum, is strongly raised and has spines at the corners. On each side of the metathorax there are three spines each, the length of which increases from front to back. In extension of the rear tip of the triangle of the mesonotum there is a longitudinal ridge on the metanotum. On this, there can be two closely spaced tubercles on the rear edge of the meso- and metanotum, which can rarely be formed as short, blunt spines. The abdomen is slender and almost cylindrical. On its second to fifth segments there is a pair of spines pointing diagonally to the side, the length of which decreases from front to back. On these segments there can also be medium-sized spines, which are significantly smaller or barely recognizable.

The females are about 6.0 to 6.2 centimetres (2.4 to 2.4 in) long. The number and arrangement of the body structures and spines is identical, although all spines are much shorter and blunter as in males. The thorax becomes evenly wider from the prothorax to the metathorax, just as the abdomen gradually becomes narrower towards the end, so that the body appears slightly convex on both sides when viewed from above. The abdomen ends in a relatively short ovipositor. Their coloration is much more variable than that of the males. In addition to the dominant brown tones, a high-contrast pattern of light beige and black tones is particularly common in newly adult females. These are more pronounced on the thorax than on the abdomen, which is usually only brown and black. With increasing age, this pattern loses contrast.

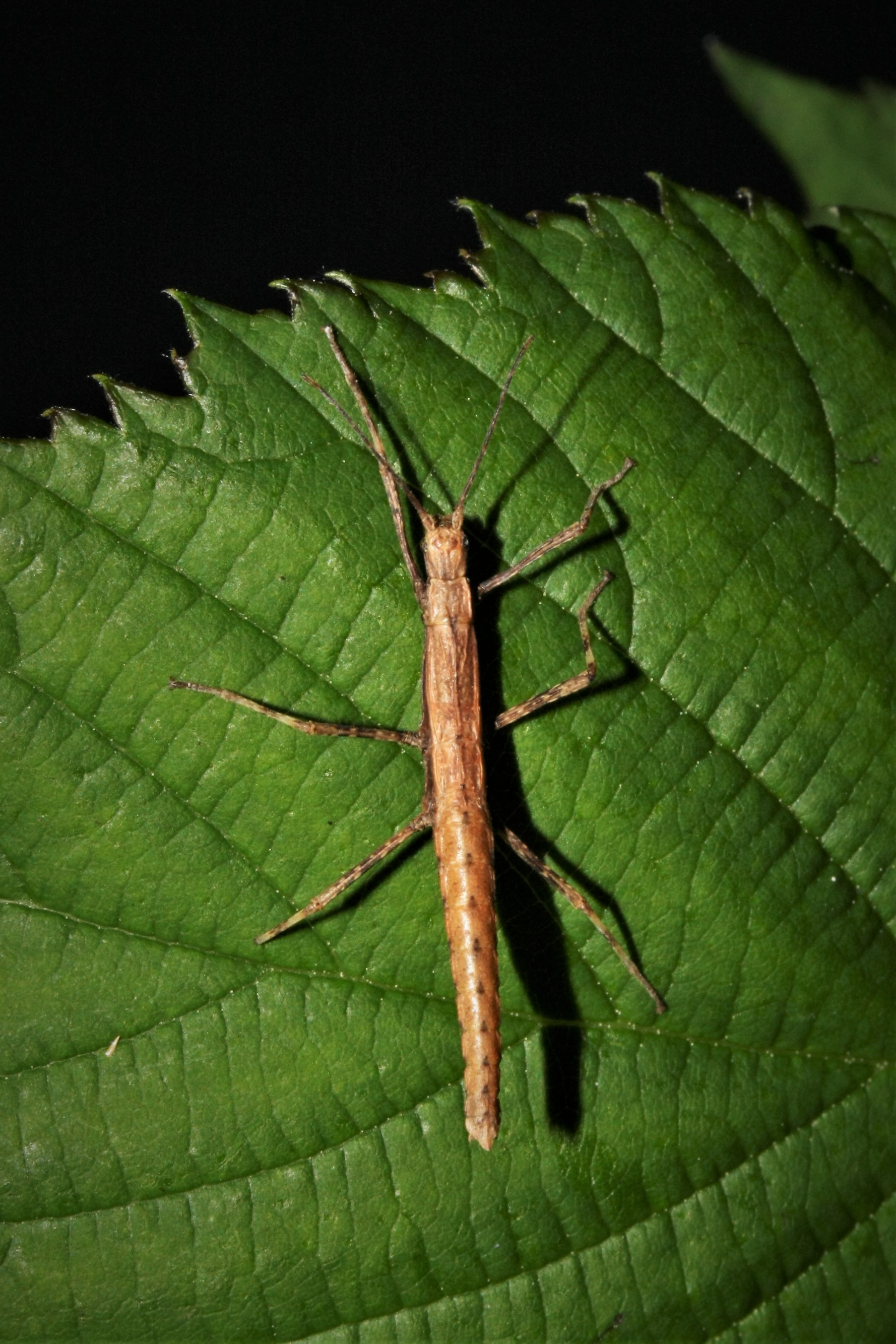
Even hatched nymph

== Distribution and way of life ==
The species was described from a male on the island of Pollilo. All other records come from the islands of Samar and Luzon. On Samar, it was found in the province of Northern Samar, while on Luzon, where the species is locally very common, records have been documented from the provinces of Aurora, Isabela, Quezon, Sorsogon, Bulacan, and Laguna. There they were found on ground-covering plants at a maximum height of 20 centimetres (7.9 in).

The females lay an egg in the ground several times a week. The eggs are 5.1 millimetres (0.20 in) 5.1 mm long and 2.8 millimetres (0.11 in) high, brown and hairy. The lid (operculum) sits on the egg at an opercular angle of about 20°. The micropylar plate forms an inverted Y, as in many Obriminae. When the nymphs hatch, they are about 15 millimetres (0.59 in) long, slender and brown in color. While the males remain slender and gradually develop their later shape and color over the course of the next molts, the female nymphs become noticeably broader and more contrasting in color until they show their maximum pattern and color variation as subadults. As adults, both sexes can live for more than a year.

== Taxonomy ==
James Abram Garfield Rehn and his son John William Holman Rehn described the species in 1939 as Hoploclonia lachesis. The description is based on a male holotype which was collected on Polillo Island and came from the collection of Taylor. It is deposited in the National Museum of Natural History in Washington, D.C.. The species name "lachesis" is borrowed from Greek mythology. Lachesis is the middle of the three Moirai, although her two sisters Clotho and Atropos are also used as species names in the species description of other Hoploclonia species in the same work. Rehn and Rehn divided the Philippine representatives they led or described into Hoploclonia according to morphological aspects into different groups. They placed Hoploclonia lachesis in the so-called Draconina group together with Hoploclonia draconina (today Tisamenus draconinus) and the newly described Hoploclonia hystrix (today Tisamenus hystrix), very strongly spined, rather elongated and long-legged species. Until 2004 Tisamenus lachesis was included in Hoploclonia. Only Oliver Zompro placed the species in the genus Tisamenus together with all other Philippine representatives of Hoploclonia. The holotype was long considered the only confirmed, known representative of the species. In October 2000 Zompro discovered in the collection of the Natural History Museum in London a male collected in 1908 by C. S. Banks in the Philippines which was a Juvenile (organism) male specimen and was labeled as Obrimus species. His determination of the animal showed that it could be another representative of this species, so that he, following the genus at the time, named it Hoploclonia cf. lachesis . It resembles the adult holotype in many features, but is significantly less spined than this, especially at the edges of the meso- and metanotum. Frank H. Hennemann identified this specimen as a representative of the less spined Tisamenus polillo.

Sarah Bank et al included a specimen from Mount Binangonan in Quezon under the name Tisamenus serratorius used at the time for the breeding stock of the species in their molecular genetic studies published in 2021. This specimen turned out to be non-conspecific with all other samples examined from the genus. It was also shown that Tisamenus lachesis is not as closely related to the also examined Tisamenus hystrix as Rehn and Rehn had assumed in their group classification in 1939.

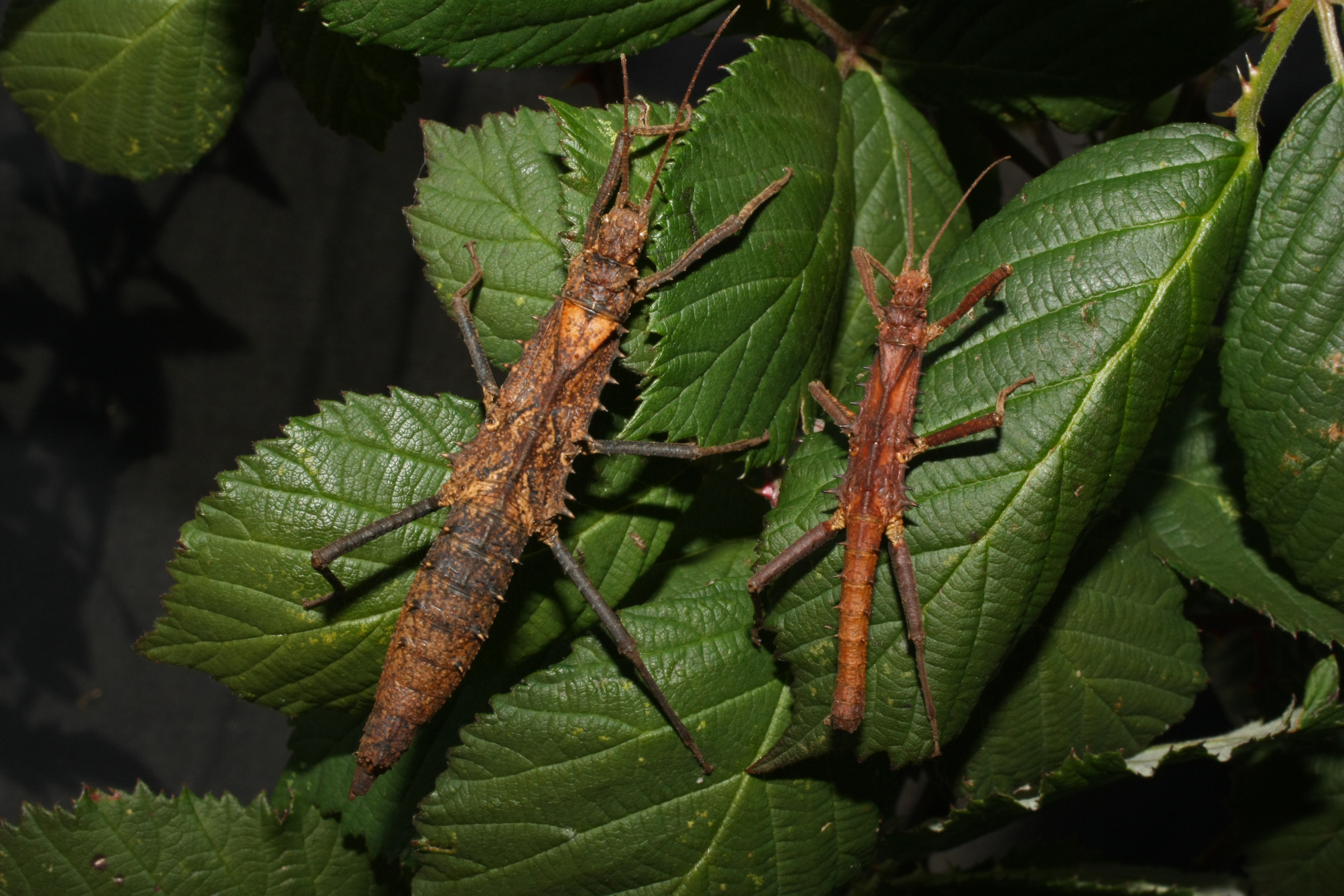
Pair from Quezon National Park

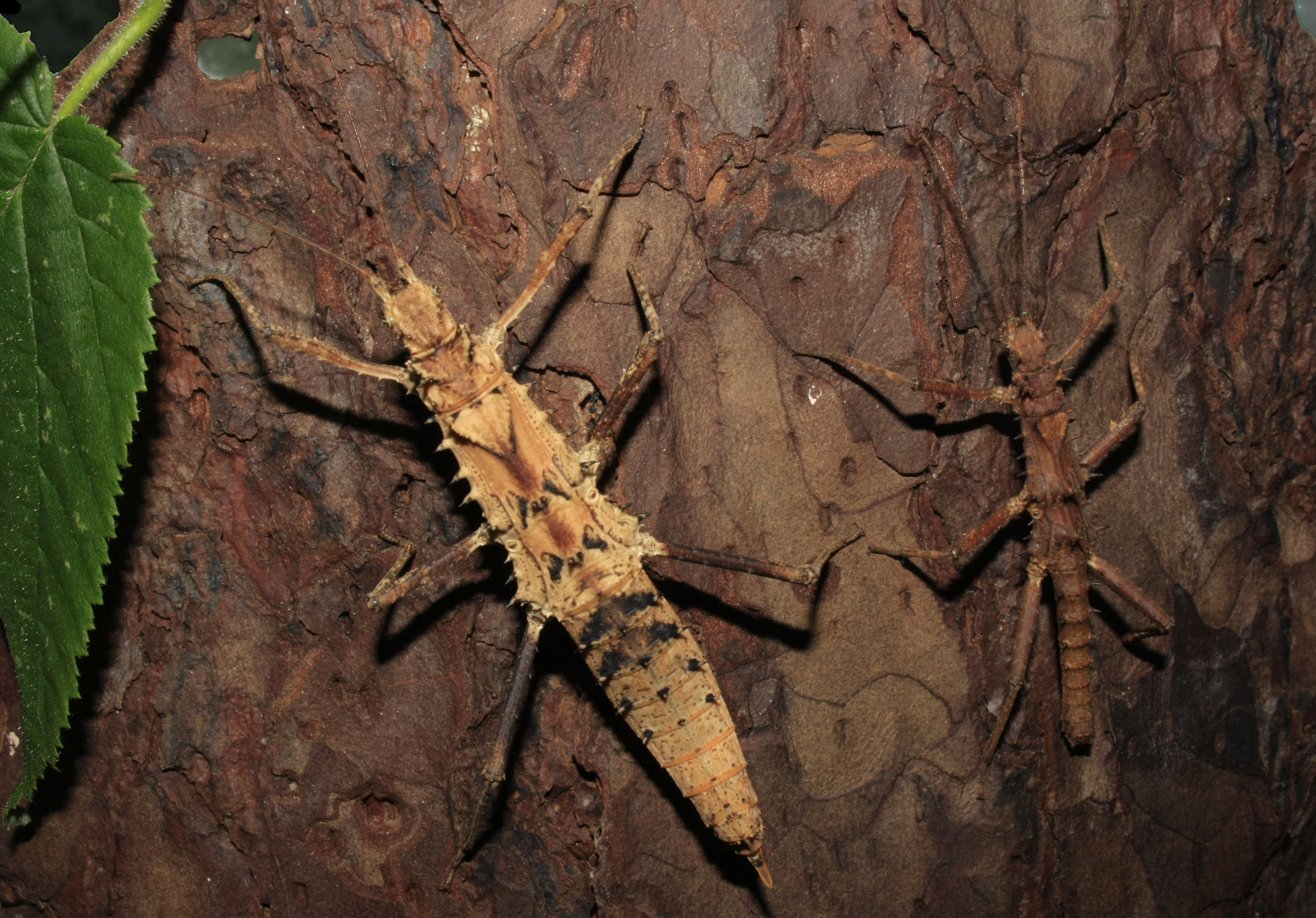
Pair from the stock from Cunayan

== In terraristics ==
Tisamenus lachesis was the first species of the genus to be found in the terrariums of European enthusiasts, but all breeding stocks were and are referred to as representatives of Tisamenus serratorius. The first breeding stocks was collected in 2009 by Joachim Bresseel and Thierry Heitzmann in the province of Quezon on the island of Luzon. Its locations are the Sierra Madre mountains near Real and Real itself. Bresseel, Rob Krijns and Tim Bollens found further specimens in 2010. The animals initially came to Europe as Tisamenus sp. 'Sierra Madre' or Tisamenus sp. 'Real'. The species was later identified by Bresseel as Tisamenus serratorius. The Phasmid Study Group lists them under this name and the PSG number 314.

At the end of November 2008, Heitzmann collected a female in the Quezon National Park, from which another breeding stock belonging to this species can be traced back. This was named after the place where it was found, Tisamenus sp. 'Quezon National Park' or Tisamenus serratorius 'QNP' (for Quezon National Park). Bressell, Bollens and Mark Bushell also found other, very similar animals on Luzon in the province Aurora near the city of San Luis in Cunayan, which had more or more pronounced spines along the middle of their body, but are no longer in breeding. They were also named after the place where they were found, and called Tisamenus sp. 'Cunayan'. The Phasmid Study Group lists it under the PSG number 359. It was not until 2025 that Hennemann identified all breeding stocks previously known as Tisamenus serratorius as representatives of Tisamenus lachesis.

The keeping and breeding of the above-mentioned breeding stocks is considered to be easy. They readily eat a variety of food plants such as bramble, hazel, firethorn, ivy and Hypericum. They only need small, moderately moist terrariums with substrate for laying eggs.

== Gallery ==
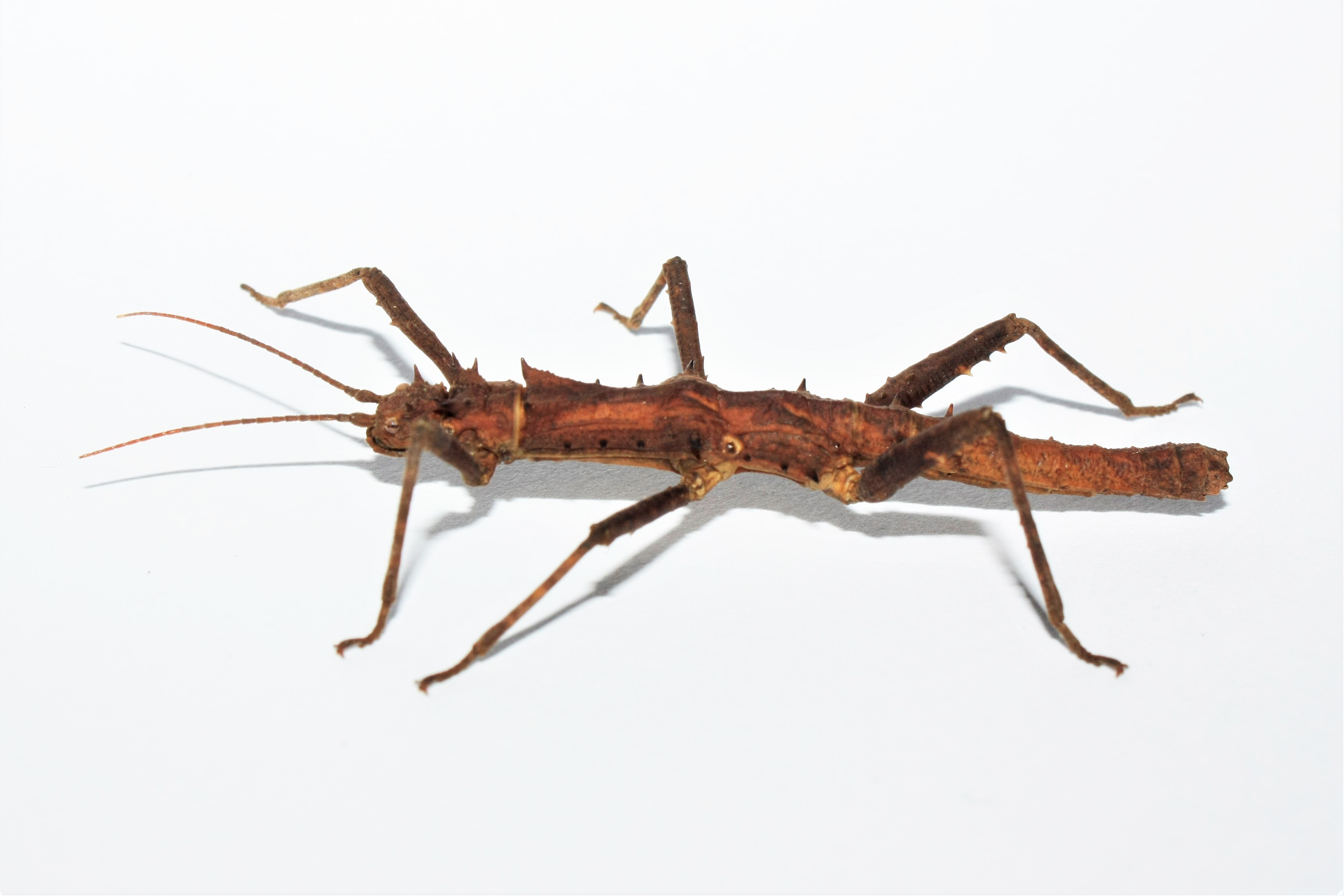
Male of the stock from 'Sierra Madre' – lateral

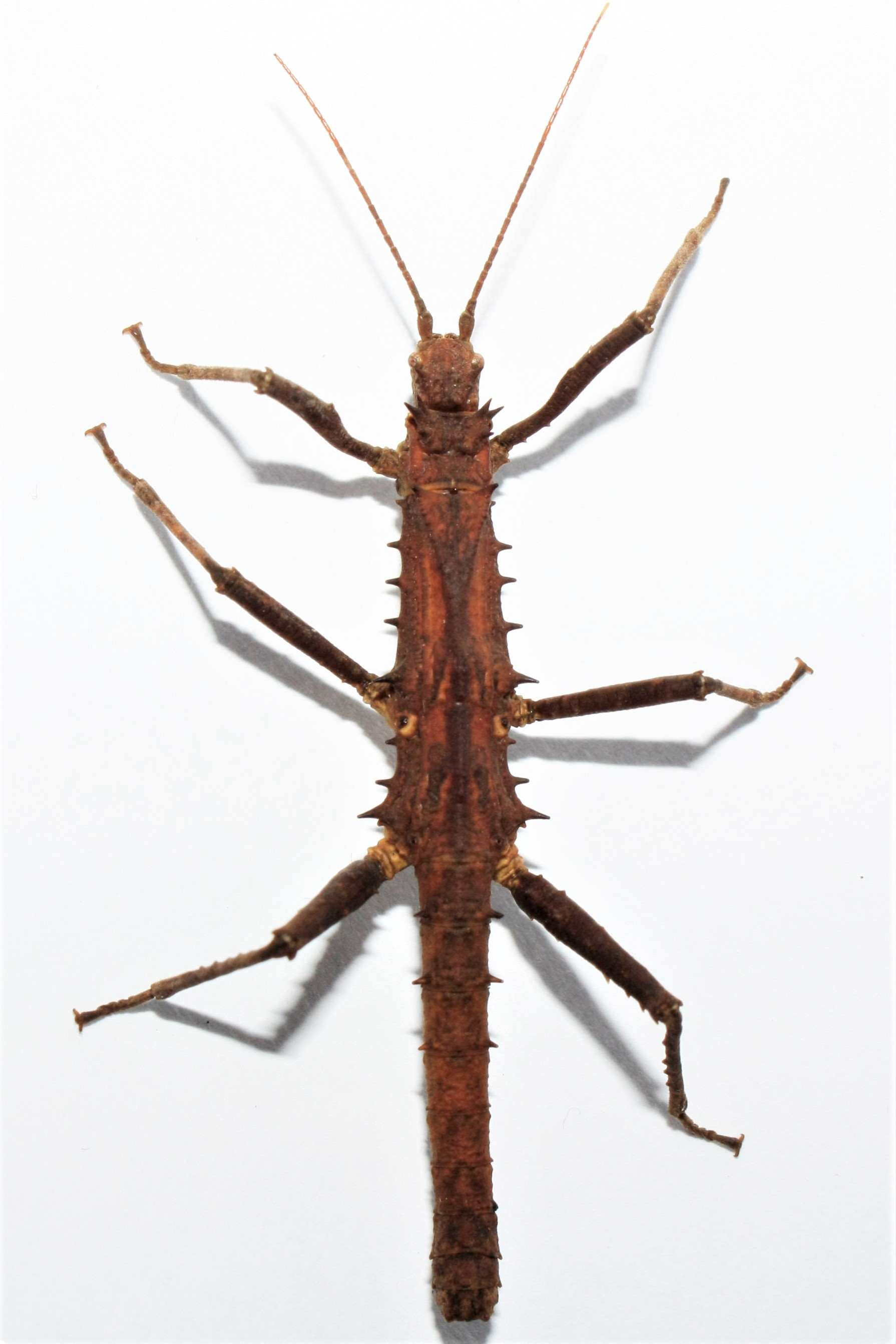
Male of the stock from 'Sierra Madre' – dorsal

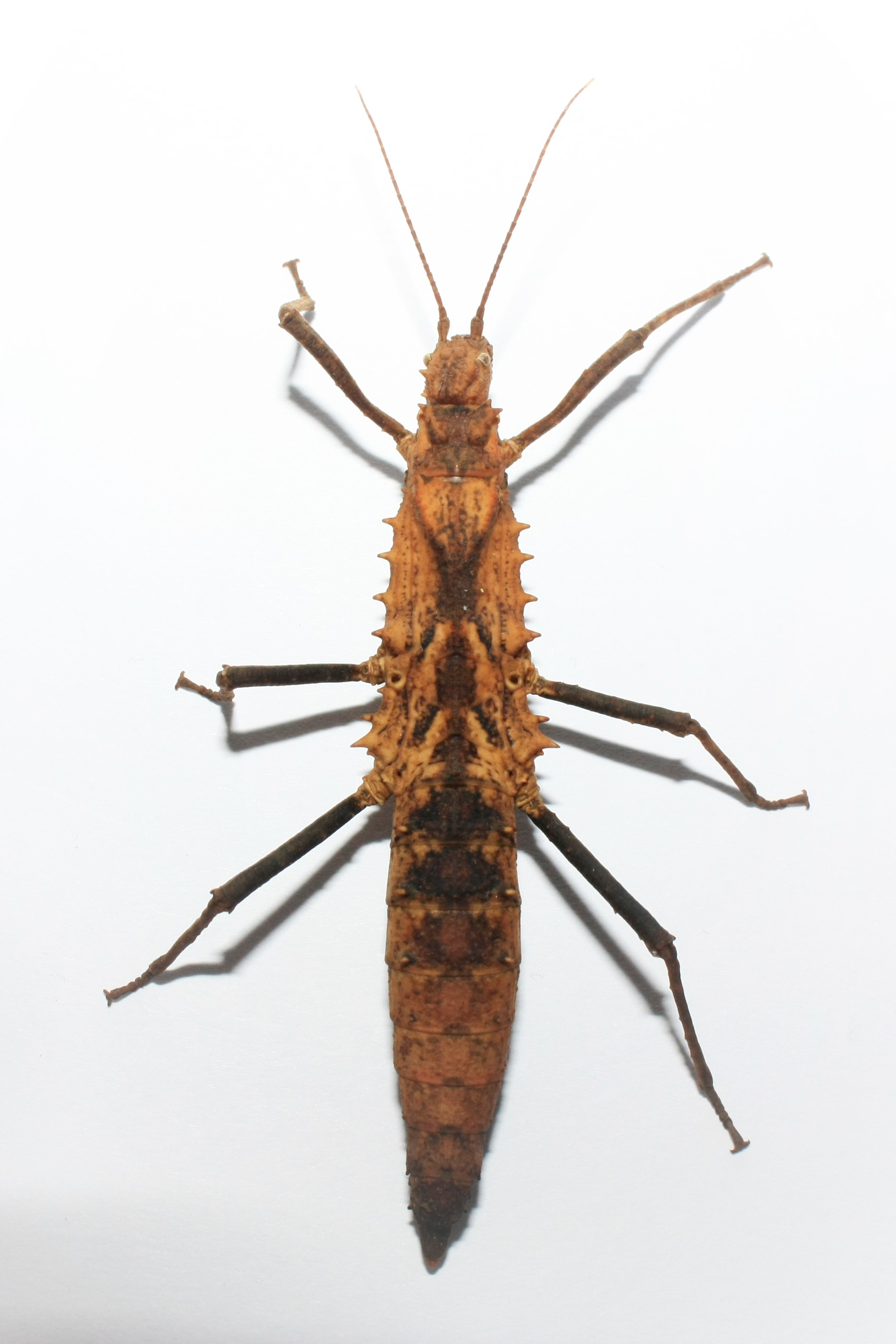
Female of the stock from 'Sierra Madre' – dorsal

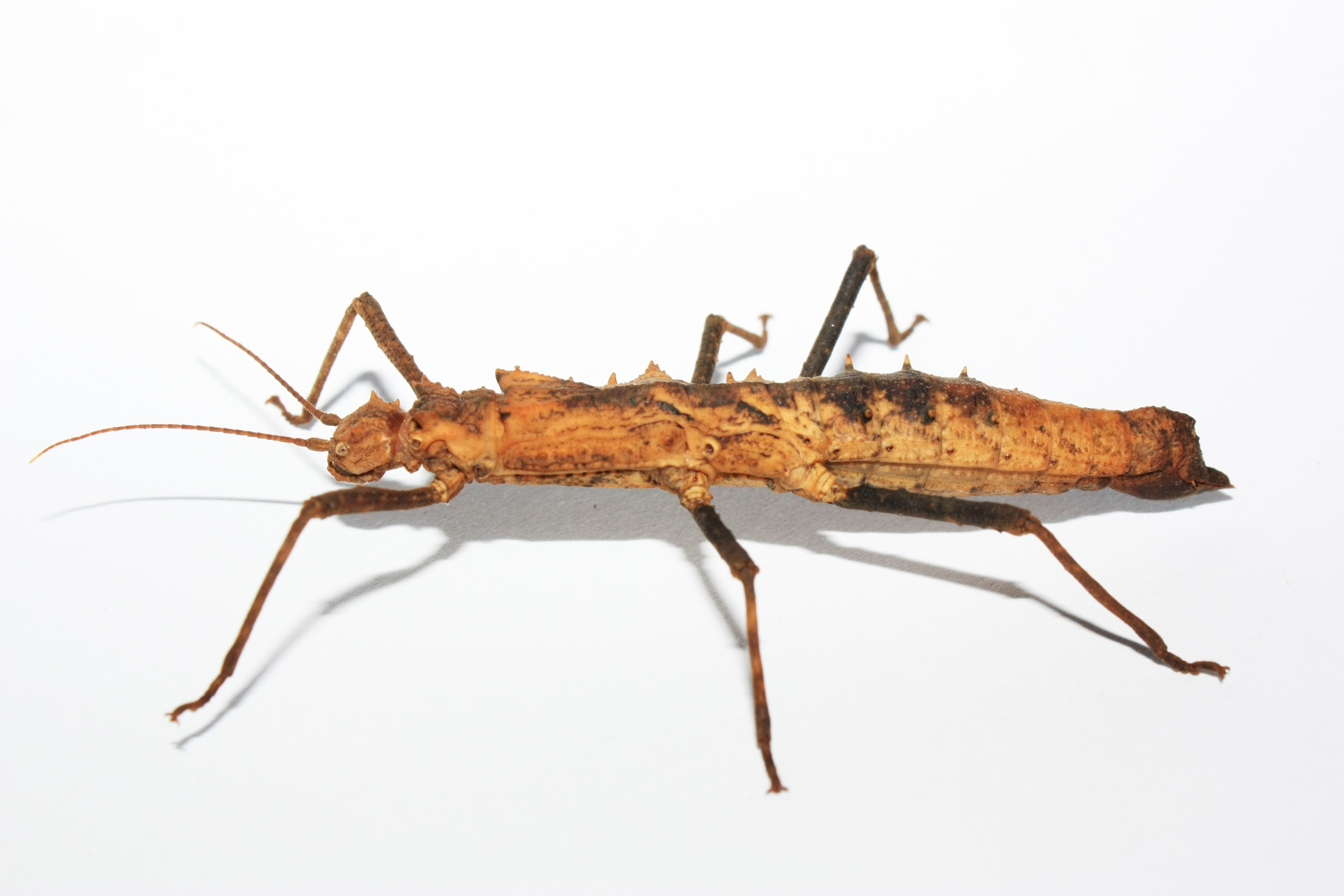
Female of the stock from 'Sierra Madre' – lateral
