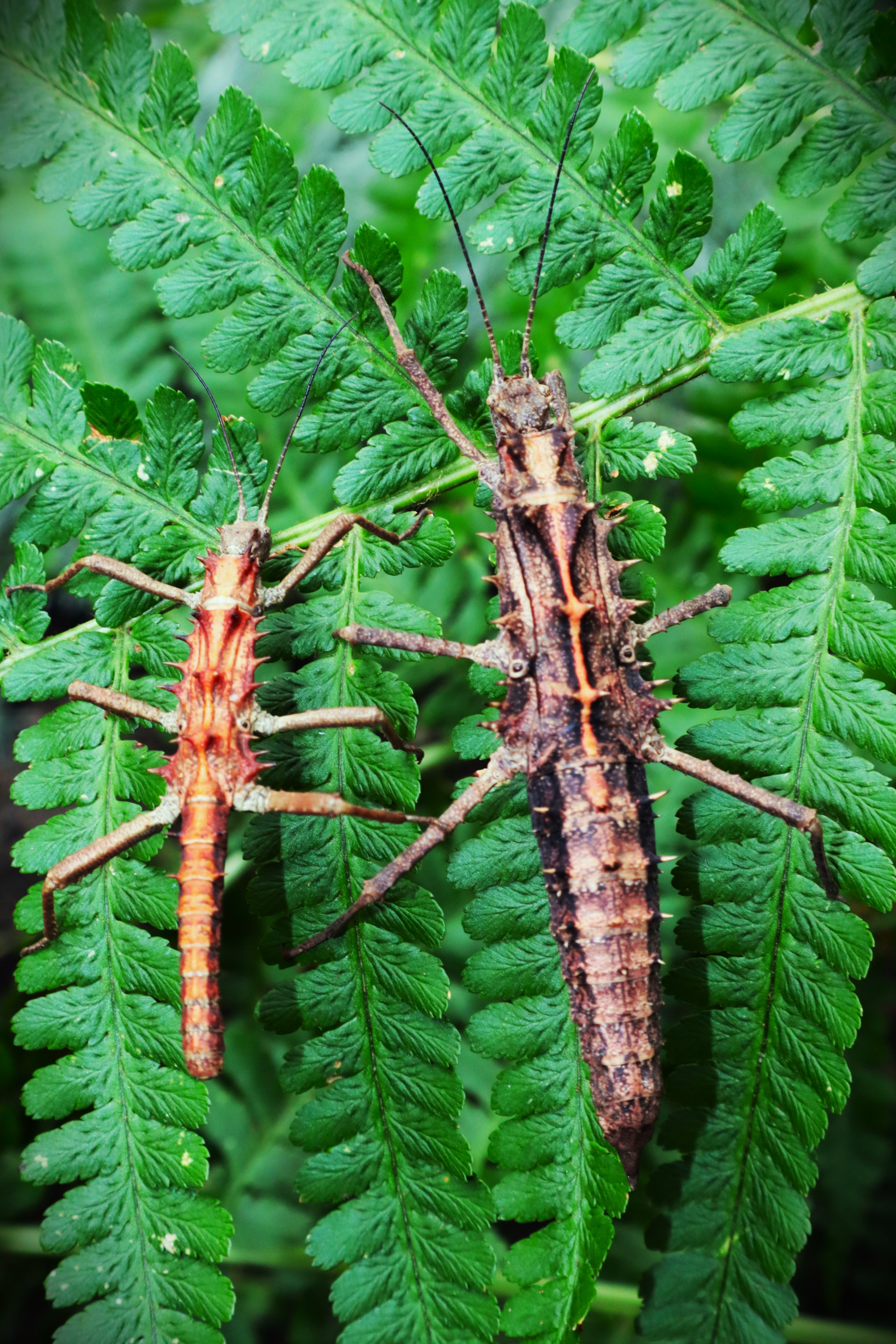
- Tisamenus napalaki, pair of a breeding stock from Palaui

Scientific classification
- Kingdom: Animalia
- Phylum: Arthropoda
- Clade: Pancrustacea
- Class: Insecta
- Order: Phasmatodea
- Family: Heteropterygidae
- Subfamily: Obriminae
- Tribe: Obrimini
- Genus: Tisamenus
- Species: T. napalaki

Binomial name
- Tisamenus napalaki Hennemann, 2025

= Tisamenus napalaki =

Species of stick insect

Tisamenus napalaki is a species of stick insect in the family Heteropterygidae native to the Philippine island of Luzon and on the island of Palaui.

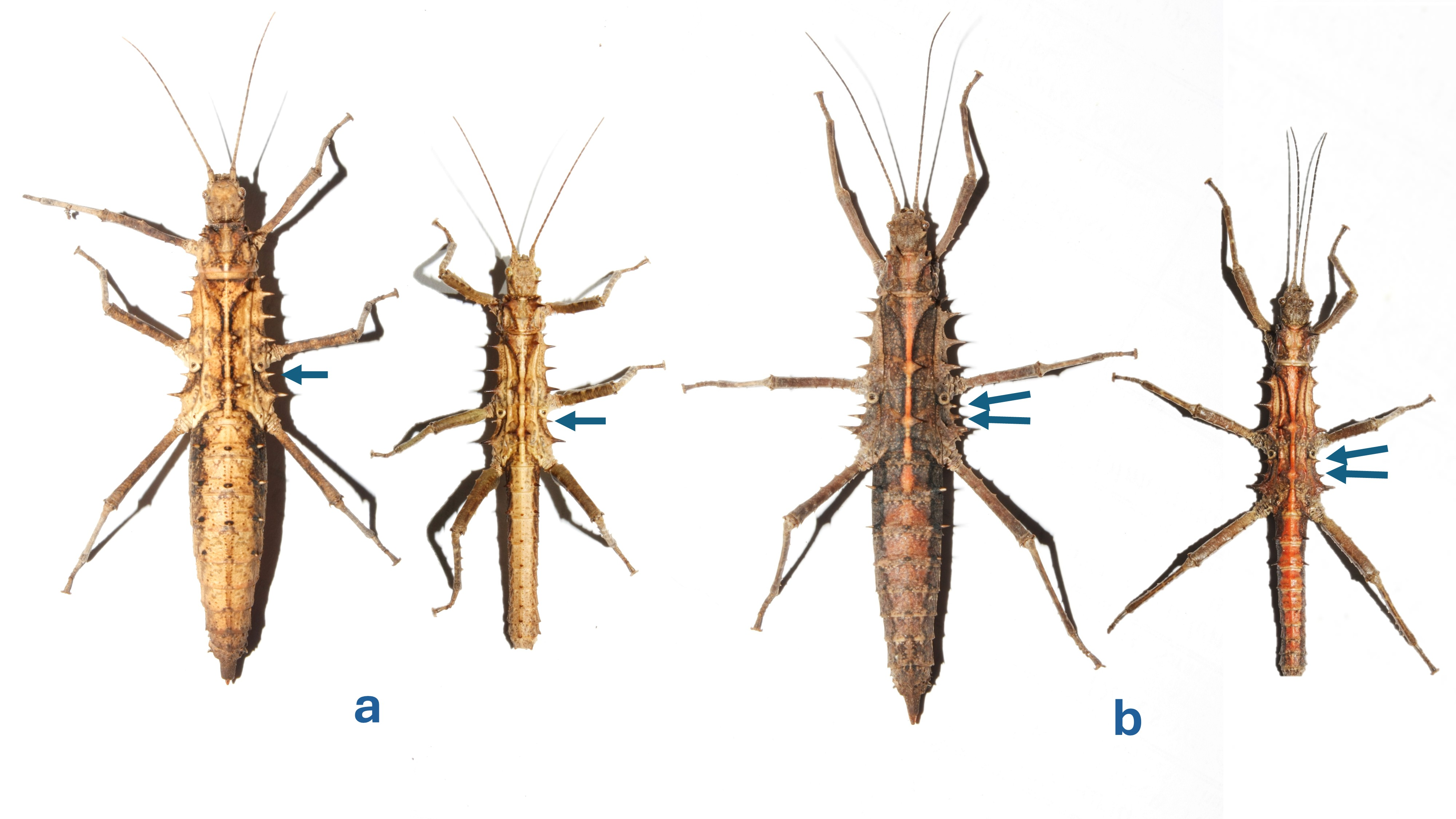
Differentiation of a) Tisamenus draconinus and b) Tisamenus napalaki based on the metapleural spines

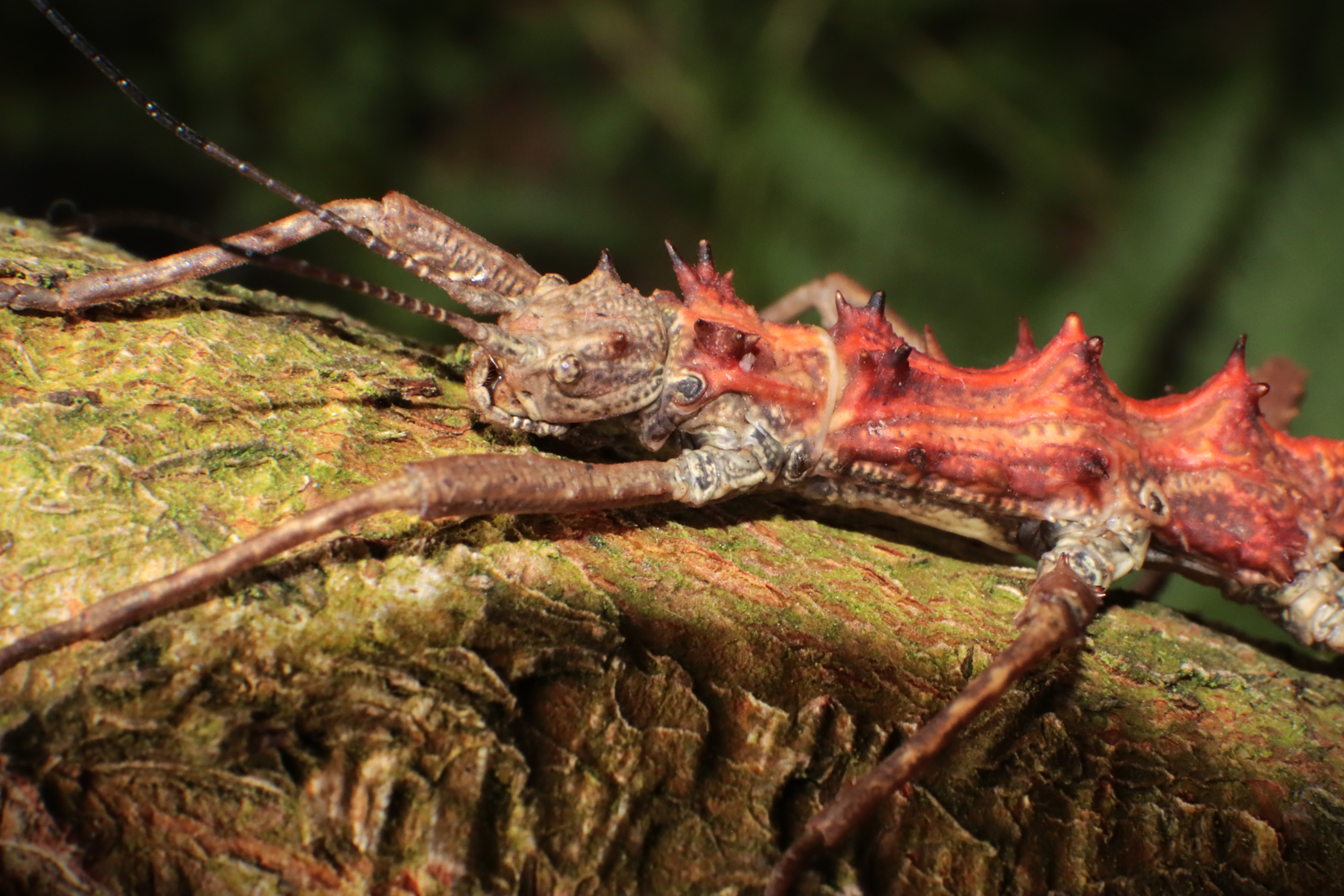
Portrait of a male

== Description ==
Tisamenus napalaki is a large and distinctive Tisamenus species. It is the most colorful member of the genus and closely resembles Tisamenus draconinus in its habitus. It differs from Tisamenus draconinus in the presence of two metapleural spines, whereas Tisamenus draconinus has only one. Furthermore, Tisamenus napalaki is significantly larger, somewhat slimmer, and the body structures are more pronounced overall, with all the main spines being longer and slender. As with Tisamenus draconinus, the two anterior corners of the genus-typical triangle on the mesonotum either possess a compound spine or have two or more spines. Males of Tisamenus napalaki reach a length of 44 to 50 millimetres (1.7 to 2.0 in). They often exhibit orange to reddish hues, but can also be almost exclusively orange to red. The inflated terga two to five of the abdomen are typical. Females grow to a length of 64 to 69 millimetres (2.5 to 2.7 in). They are also highly contrasting in color, with color patterns in shades of white, cream, yellow, and black. They may also have orange hues in the form of a more or less narrow line, usually extending from the meso- through the metanotum to the anterior abdomen.

== Distribution ==
The species has been found in various locations in northern Luzon, including the provinces of Cagayan, Isabela, and Kalinga, as well as on the island of Palaui, which also belongs to Cagayan Province and is located at the northeasternmost point of Luzon.

== Reproduction ==
The relatively large eggs laid by females using their ovipositor are 4.4 millimetres (0.17 in) long, 2.8 millimetres (0.11 in) wide, and 3.0 millimetres (0.12 in) high, including the lid (operculum). The surface of the egg capsule is covered with an irregular network of ridges, densely covered with frayed to bristly outgrowths. The micropylar plate is relatively small, barely more than 0.7 times as long as the capsule. As is typical for the genus, it forms an inverted Y. Its central region is broad, and the shape tapers generally toward all three arms, but particularly sharply toward the lower two, rather short arms. The micropylar plate does not reach the ventral side. The operculum sits at an angle of approximately 5 degrees on the egg capsule and slopes backward, toward the micropylar plate.

== Taxonomy ==
Frank H. Hennemann described the species in 2025 as part of a taxonomic revision of the genus Tisamenus. The species name "napalaki" means "inflated" in Filipino and refers to the characteristically inflated anterior abdominal terga of the males. A male was selected as holotype. It was collected by Ismael Lumawig in 2014 in Santa Ana, Cagayan Province (exact coordinates 18°28'N 122°09'E). It was then transferred to the Museum of Natural Sciences in Brussels via Bruno Kneubühler, where it is deposited. Two females and one male from Kalinga Province are also deposited in Brussels as paratypes. Two further male paratypes, deposited in Brussels, are derived from captive-bred specimens from Palaui. A further 28 specimens and 23 eggs are deposited as paratypes in Hennemann's specimen collection, including four immature females. Some of the paratypes originate from San Pablo in Isabela Province and Santa Ana, and some from captive-bred specimens from Palaui. All wild-caught specimens were collected between 2012 and 2015.

While describing the species and working on the genus, Hennemann noted that this species had previously been part of scientific publications, particularly from Asia. However, it was always considered Tisamenus draconinus. This applies to Matsumura and Hirayama 1932, Shiraki 1935, Huang 2002, Xu 2005, and Chen & He 2008.

Sarah Bank et al. also included 14 samples from various species of the genus Tisamenus in their 2021 study on the relationships within the Heteropterygidae, based on genetic analyses. Among them was at least one sample of the then undescribed Tisamenus napalki, whose position within the genus has thus already been investigated (see cladogram of Tisamenus).

== Terraristics ==
The first animals of the species to be bred were collected by Albert Kang in June 2016 on the island of Palaui. Thierry Heitzmann successfully induced the collected animals to lay eggs and shipped some of them to Europe. From these, a breeding stock was established there, initially designated Tisamenus sp. 'Palaui'. Like all bred species, this one also feeds on leaves of bramble, other Rosaceae, and hazel. Due to its coloring and low maintenance and breeding requirements, Tisamenus napalaki 'Palaui' is one of the most popular breeding strains of the genus in terrariums.

== Gallery ==
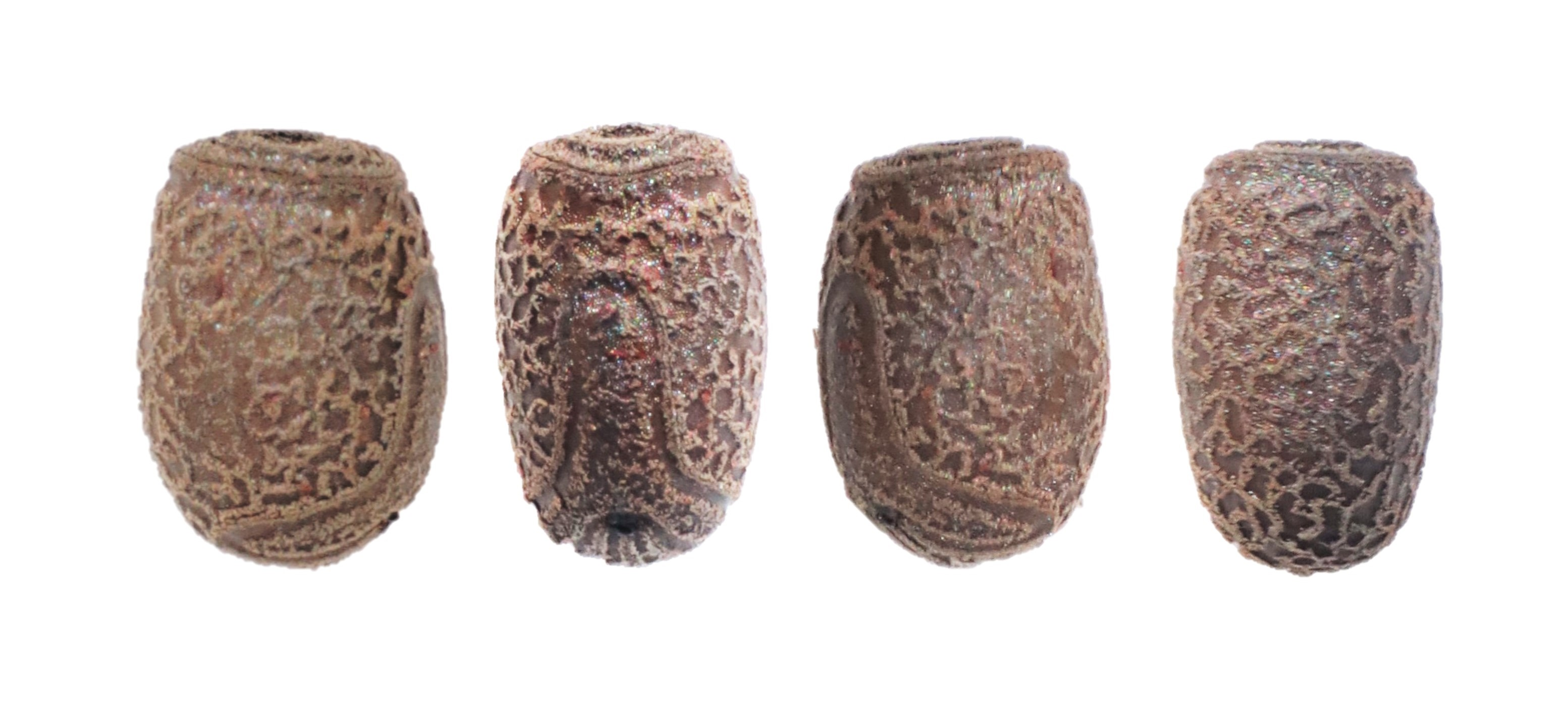
Eggs from lateral, dorsal, lateral and ventral

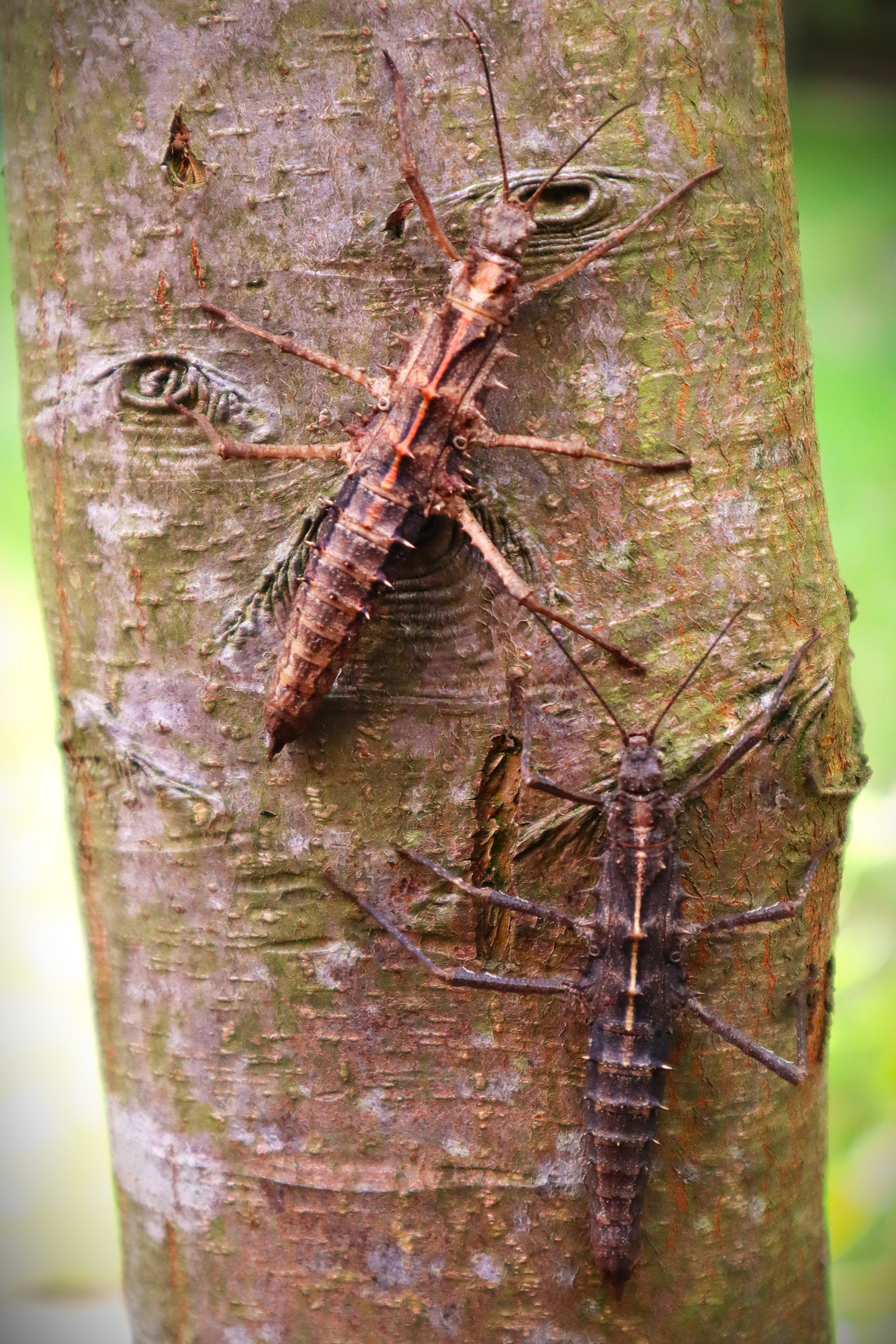
Different colored females of the breeding stock from Palaui

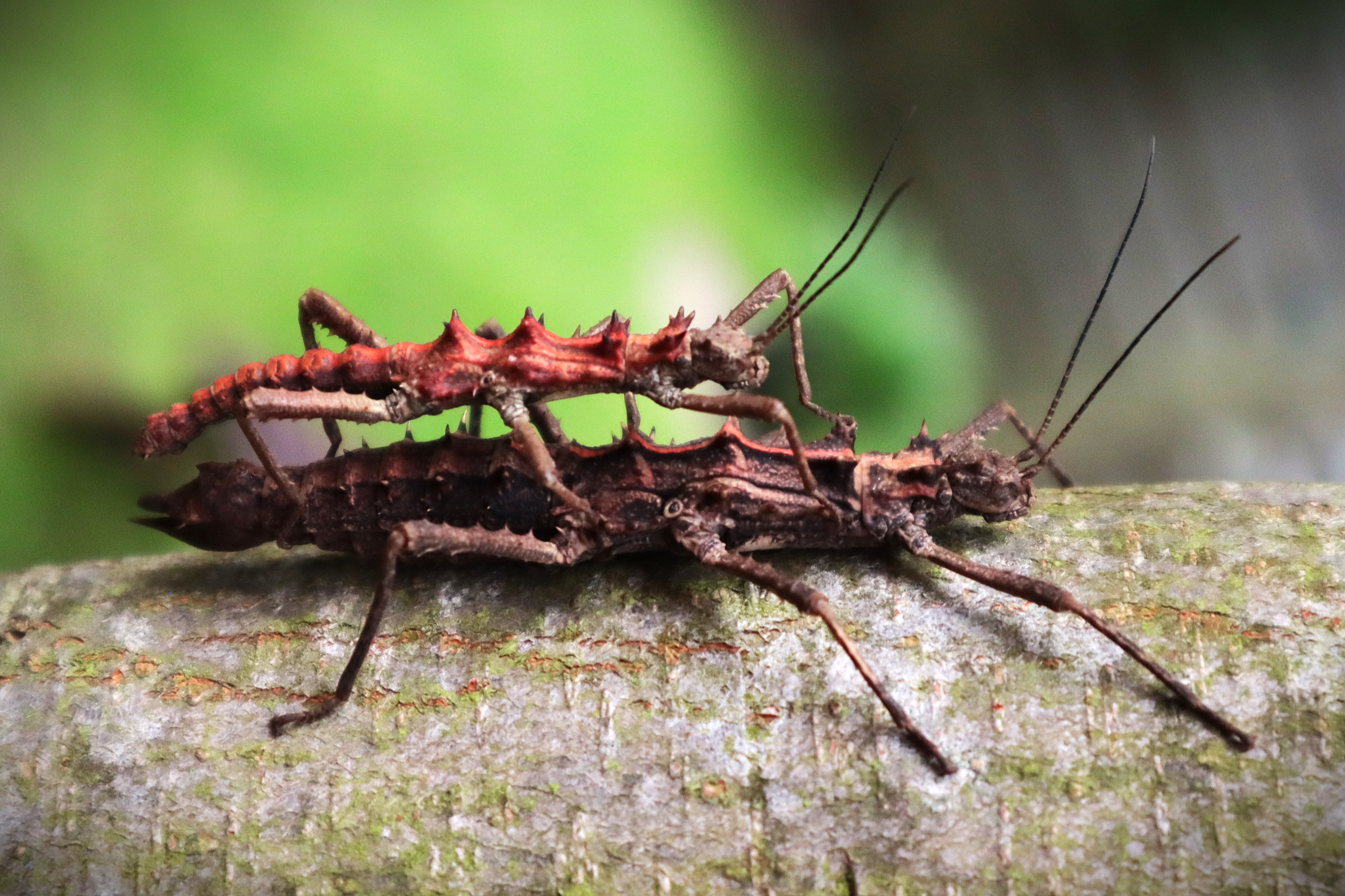
Pair of the breeding stock from Palaui

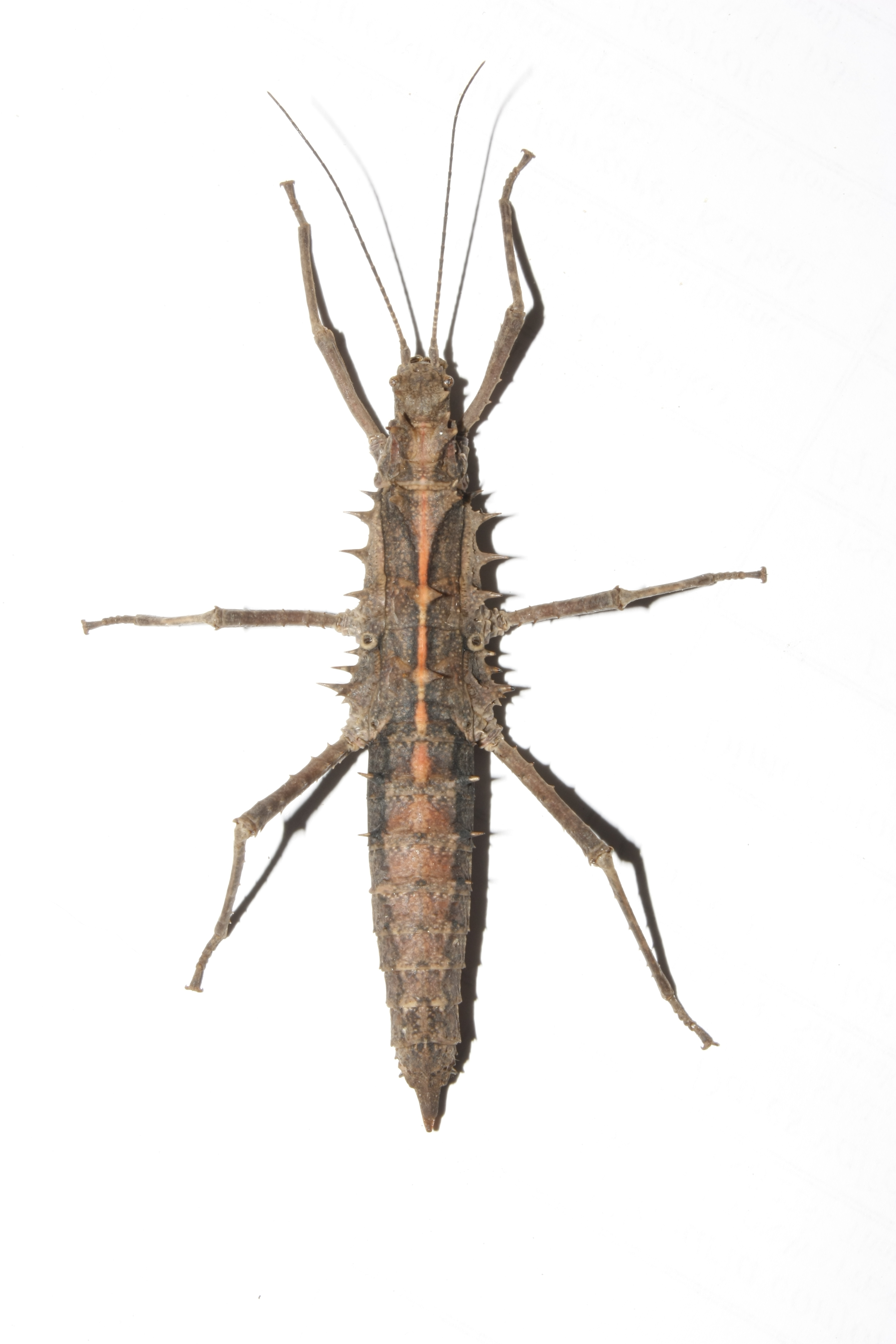
Female from dorsal

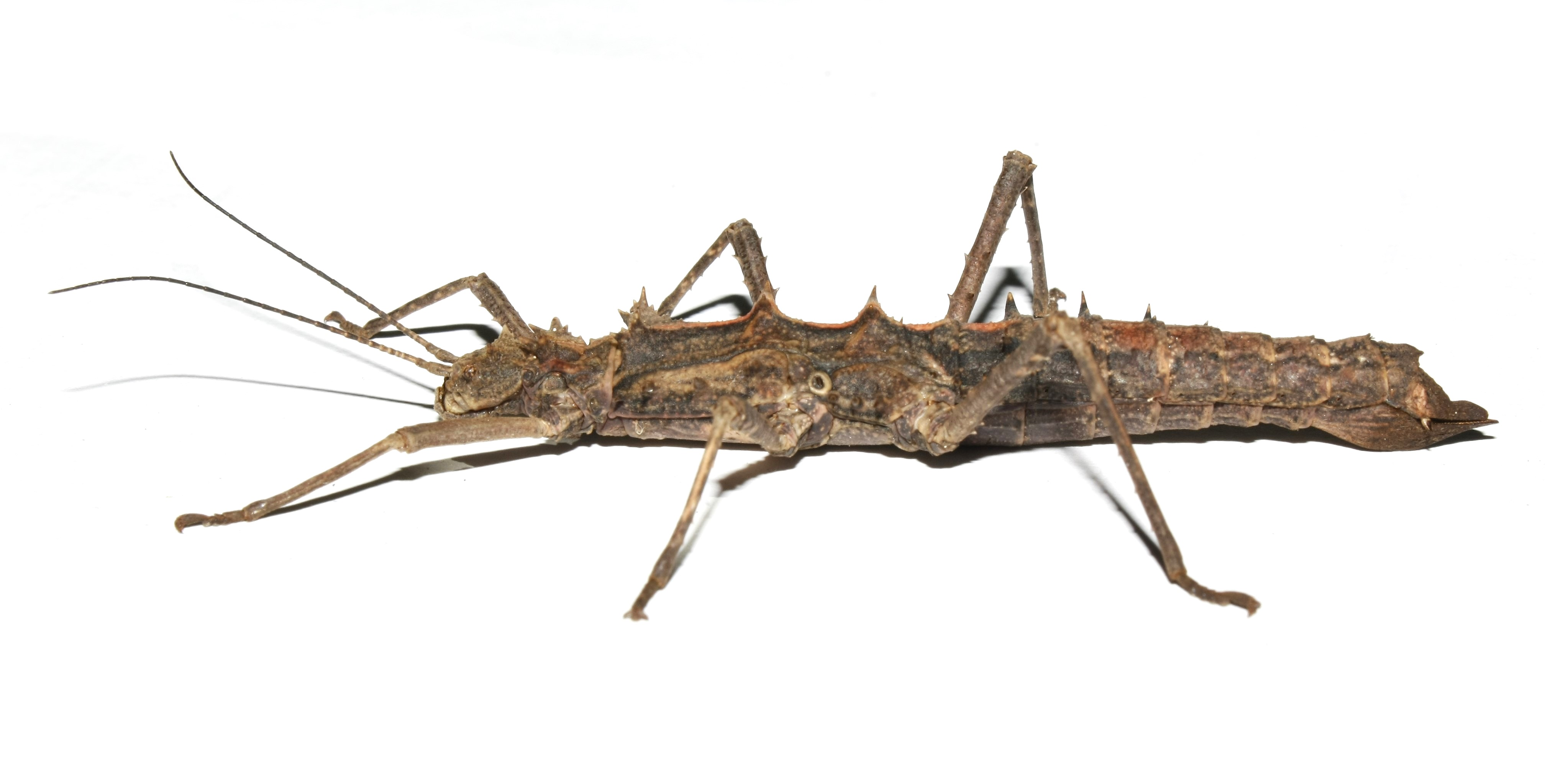
Female from lateral

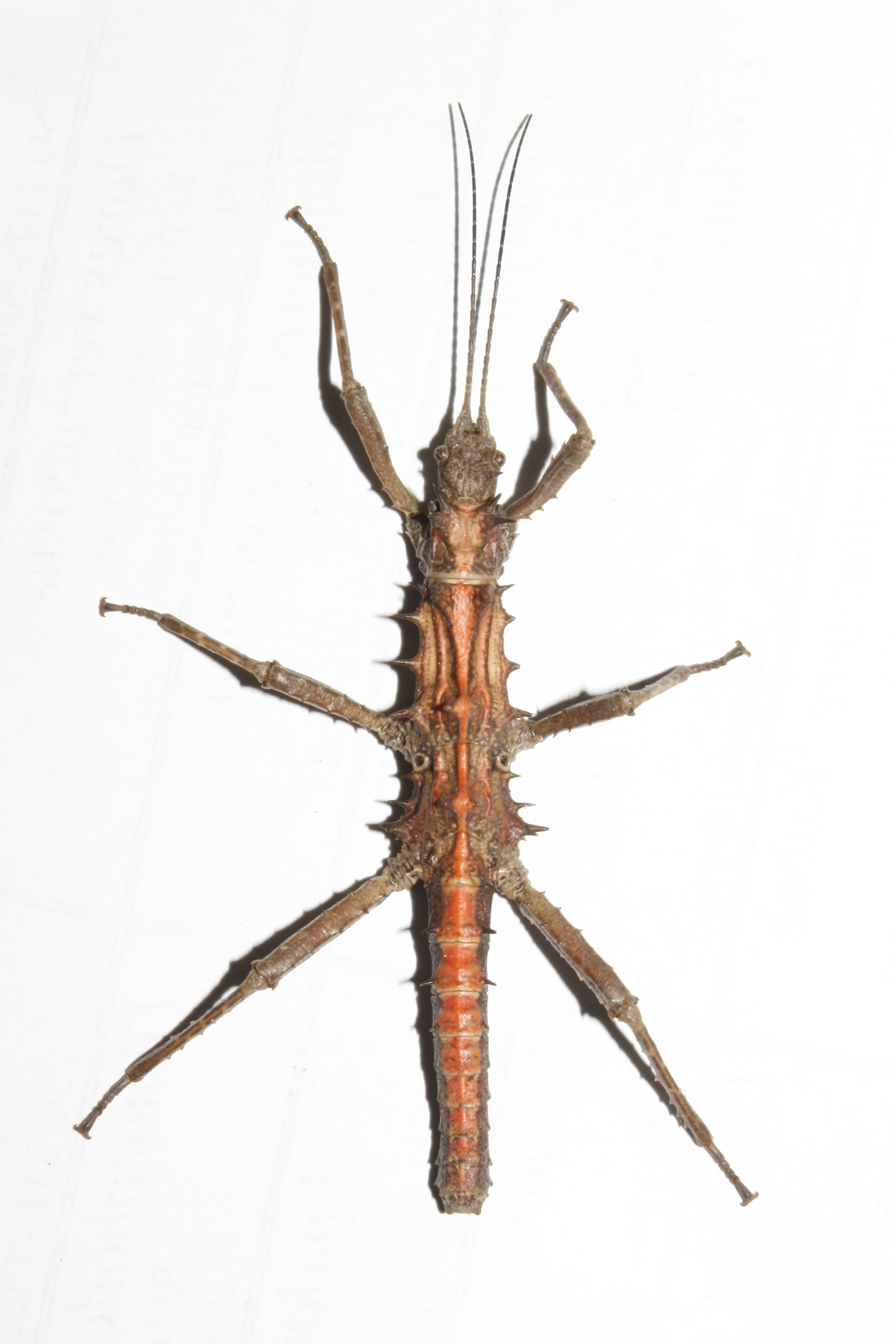
Male from dorsal

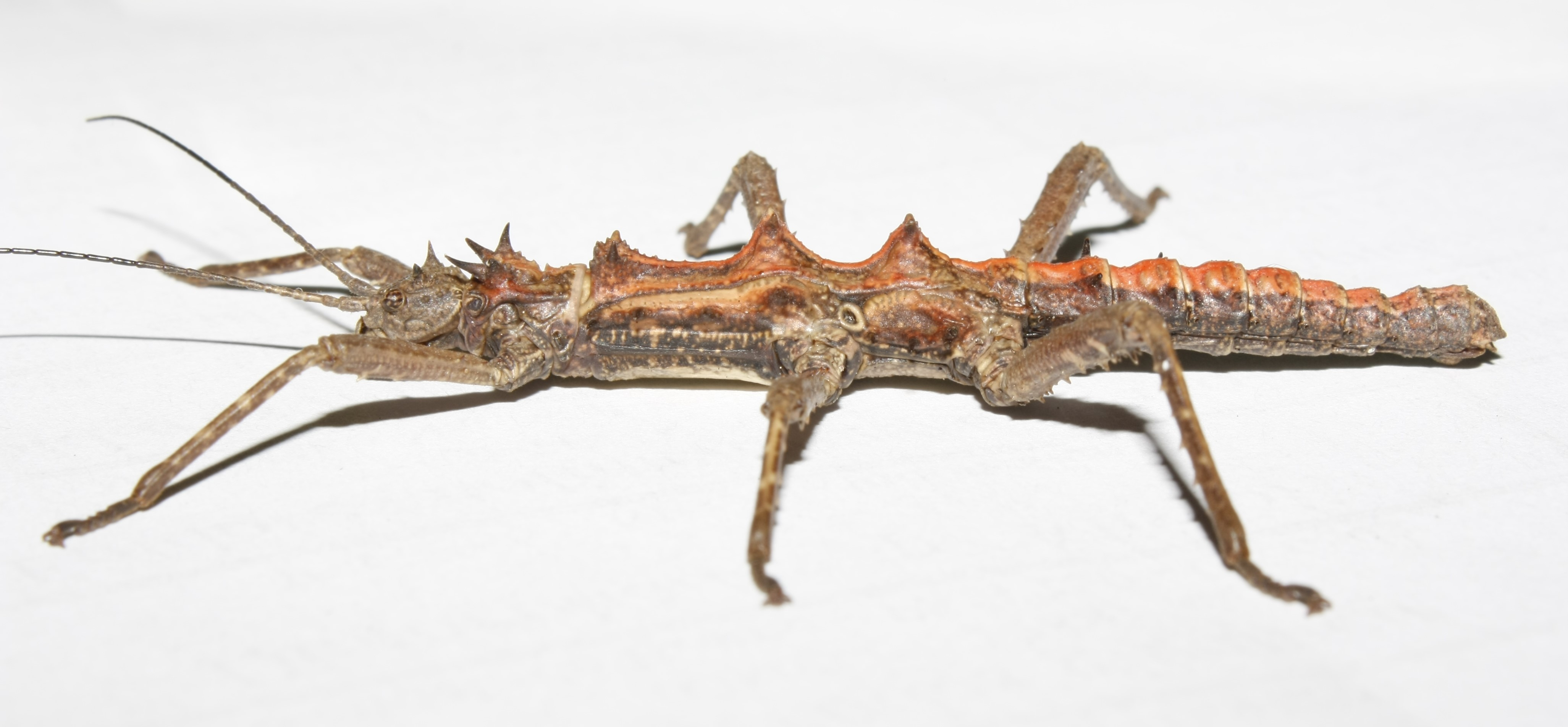
Male from lateral
