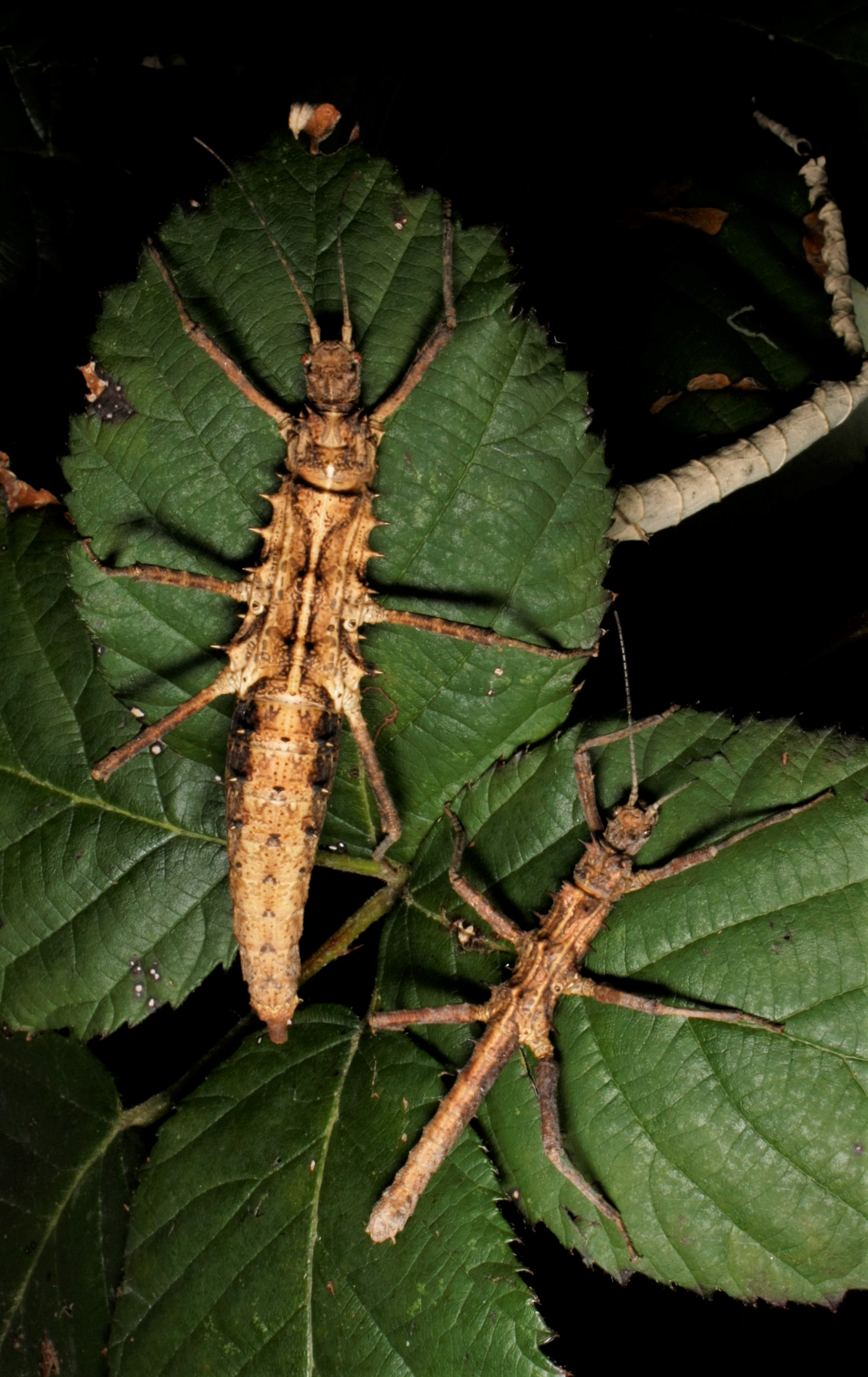
- Tisamenus draconinus, pair of a breeding stock from Cagayan

Scientific classification
- Kingdom: Animalia
- Phylum: Arthropoda
- Clade: Pancrustacea
- Class: Insecta
- Order: Phasmatodea
- Family: Heteropterygidae
- Subfamily: Obriminae
- Tribe: Obrimini
- Genus: Tisamenus
- Species: T. draconinus

Binomial name
- Tisamenus draconinus (Westwood, 1848)

Synonyms
- Phasma (Pachymorpha) draconinum Westwood, 1848; Acanthoderus draconinus (Westwood, 1848); Hoploclonia draconina (Westwood, 1848); Tisamenus draconina (Westwood, 1848)

= Tisamenus draconinus =

Species of stick insect

Tisamenus draconinus is a species of stick insect in the family Heteropterygidae endemic to the Philippine islanda of Luzon, Polillo and Leyte.

== Description ==
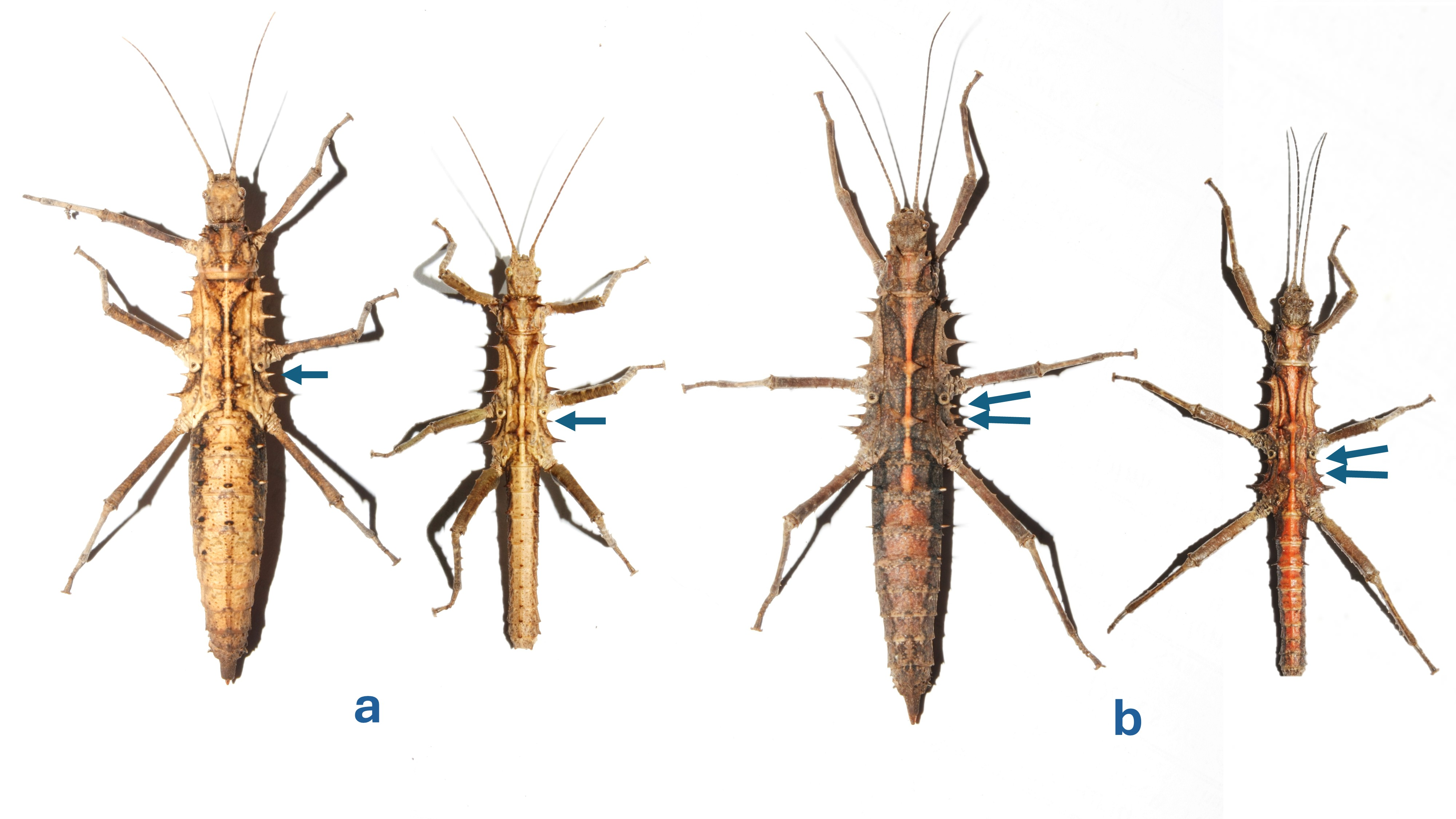
Differentiation of a) Tisamenus draconinus and b) Tisamenus napalaki based on the metapleural spines

The species is elongated and is described as one of the most spiny of the genus. Females reach a length of 55.0 to 63.8 millimetres (2.17 to 2.51 in) and vary in color between dark and light brown. Dark brown specimens sometimes only have a light median line on the thorax. Males are 38.0 to 47.5 millimetres (1.50 to 1.87 in) long and are not quite as variable in color. The triangle on the mesonotum typical of the genus is flat and ends, as in Tisamenus lachesis, with interposterior mesonotal spines. As in the very similar Tisamenus napalaki, the two front angles of the triangle end in compound spines that form a toothed crest, the largest element of which is slightly removed from the actual angles. A pair of median metanotals, that is, middle spines on the metanotum, are present. The side edges of the meso- and metanotum are reinforced with long spines. There are only four spines on each side of the mesonatal margins, while there are usually five in similar species. On each side of the metathorax there is a lateral spine and a very large supraoxal spine, i.e. a spine located above the coxa. Tisamenus draconinus is most easily distinguished from the similar Tisamenus napalaki by its metapleural spinesa. While Tisamenus napalaki has two spines, Tisamenus draconinus has only one on each side. In contrast to many other Tisamenus species, Tisamenus draconina lacks median spines on the upper surface of the anterior segments of the abdomen. Instead, there are only flat nodules or tubercles here. A spine is attached to each side of the first four abdominal segments, with the front spines being longer and more pronounced than the rear ones.

== Distribution ==
While the first description only mentions the Philippines as a distribution area, James Abram Garfield Rehn and his son John William Holman Rehn specify this and state the sub-province of Apayao on Luzon as the locality of the eight specimens they examined. The origin of the breeding stock is in the neighboring province of Cagayan. Other sites are in the provinces of Aurora, Isabella, Mountain Province and Polillo Island, which belongs to Quezon Province. Further evidence comes from Mahaplag on the island of Leyte, much further south. The localities of Taiwan and Borneo seem doubtful.

== Taxonomy ==
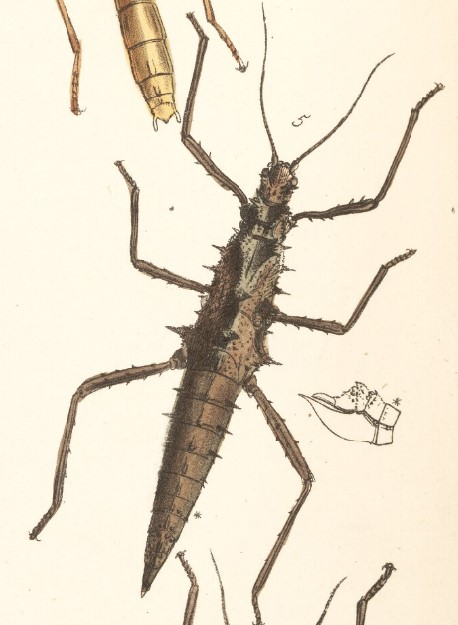
Drawing from the 1848 species description by Westwood

John Obadiah Westwood described the species in 1848 under the basionym Phasma (Pachymorpha) draconinum and depicts a female. The chosen species name “draconinum” is derived from the Latin “draconis” and means “dragon”. As early as 1859 he transferred it to the genus Acanthoderus established by George Robert Gray in 1834. Carl Stål names the species in 1875 as belonging to the genus Tisamenus described by him. However, in the combination of the generic and species names, he only names the newly described Tisamenus serratorius and Acanthoderus deplanatus, also described by Westwood, abbreviated as T. deplanato (today Tisamenus deplanatus) and counts Acanthoderus draconinus Westw. only at the end as belonging to this genus. While William Forsell Kirby followed this assignment in 1904 and named the species for the first time in combination with the genus name as Tisamenus draconinus, Josef Redtenbacher 1906, Lawrence Bruner 1915 and also Philip Edward Bragg 1995 cite Stål with an alleged assignment of the species to Hoploclonia and calls it Hoploclonia draconina. In fact, Stål only names their type species Hoploclonia gecko in this genus. Redtenbacher mentions 1906 neither the work of Kirby nor its genus assignment and treats the species as a representative of Hoploclonia. He again depicts a female of the species and names specimens from Westwood from the Hofmuseum Vienna (now the Natural History Museum in Vienna) as well as specimens from Borneo from the collection of Staudinger (probably Otto Staudinger) and his own collection as the material examined. Because Tisamenus draconinus does not occur on Borneo, Bragg assumes in 1995 and 1998 that the material was at least partially confused or mixed with Hoploclonia cuspidata, although this was described by Redtenbacher in the same work using a female. In 1939, Rehn and Rehn cite Stål's correct assignment, but transfer the species to Hoploclonia, just like all other representatives of this genus, and synonymize Tisamenus with it. The Philippine representatives they lead in Hoploclonia divide them into different groups according to morphological aspects. In the so-called Draconina group, they placed with Hoploclonia draconina, as well as the newly described Hoploclonia hystrix (today Tisamenus hystrix) and Hoploclonia lachesis (today Tisamenus lachesis), very strongly spined, elongated and long-legged species. Up to 2004, Tisamenus draconinus is continued in almost all works in Hoploclonia. It was Oliver Zompro who put it back in Tisamenus as Tisamenus draconina together with all the other Philippine representatives, thus following both Stål and Kirby's assignment. The use of the originally masculine species name ending "-us", adapted to the also masculine gender of the genus name, was only reintroduced in 2024.

A female lectotype and a male paralectotype are found in the Oxford University Museum of Natural History. The two specimens purchased for the museum by Mr. D. Cuming were selected as types by Bragg in 1995. Location information or further collection data are missing for both.

In a taxonomic revision of the genus Tisamenus published in 2025, Frank H. Hennemann determined that some of the animals previously referred to as Tisamenus draconinus (sometimes with a different spelling or listed in the genus Hoploclonia) belong to Tisamenus napalaki, which was only described in 2025. This applies to Matsumura and Hirayama 1932, Shiraki 1935, Huang 2002, Xu 2005, and Chen & He 2008.

== Terraristics ==
On November 5, 2014, Thierry Heitzmann and Albert Kang collected two very differently colored adult females in a protected area near the Callao Cave in Cagayan Province. From the eggs laid by these females, a sexual breeding stock was established, which was distributed as Tisamenus sp. 'Cagayan'. It is one of the most widespread species of the genus. Hennemann noted in 2023 that Tisamenus draconinius must be a breeding species and examined the breeding stock from Cagayan as well as another one from the island of Palaui, which is also located in Cagayan Province. The results showed that the Palaui stock belongs to a new species described in 2025 as Tisamenus napalaki, while the one from Cagayan was identified as Tisamenus draconinus.

The species is very easy to keep and breed. Various forage plants such as bramble, hazel, firethorn, ivy and St. John's-worts are eaten.

== Gallery ==
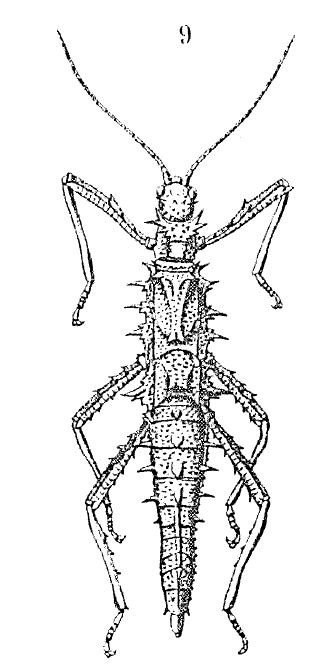
Drawing of a female from Redtenbacher 1906

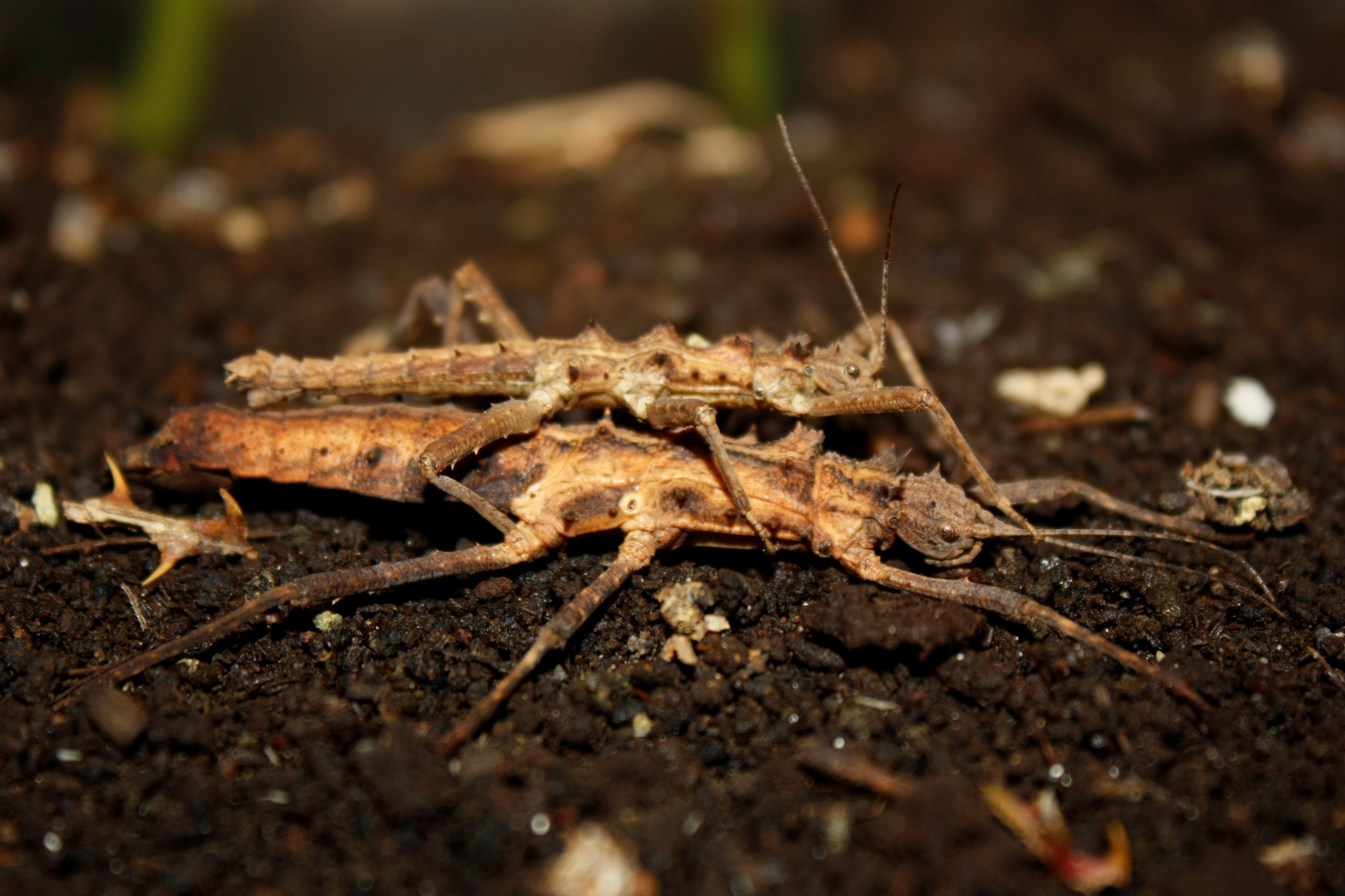
Pair of the breeding stock from Cagayan

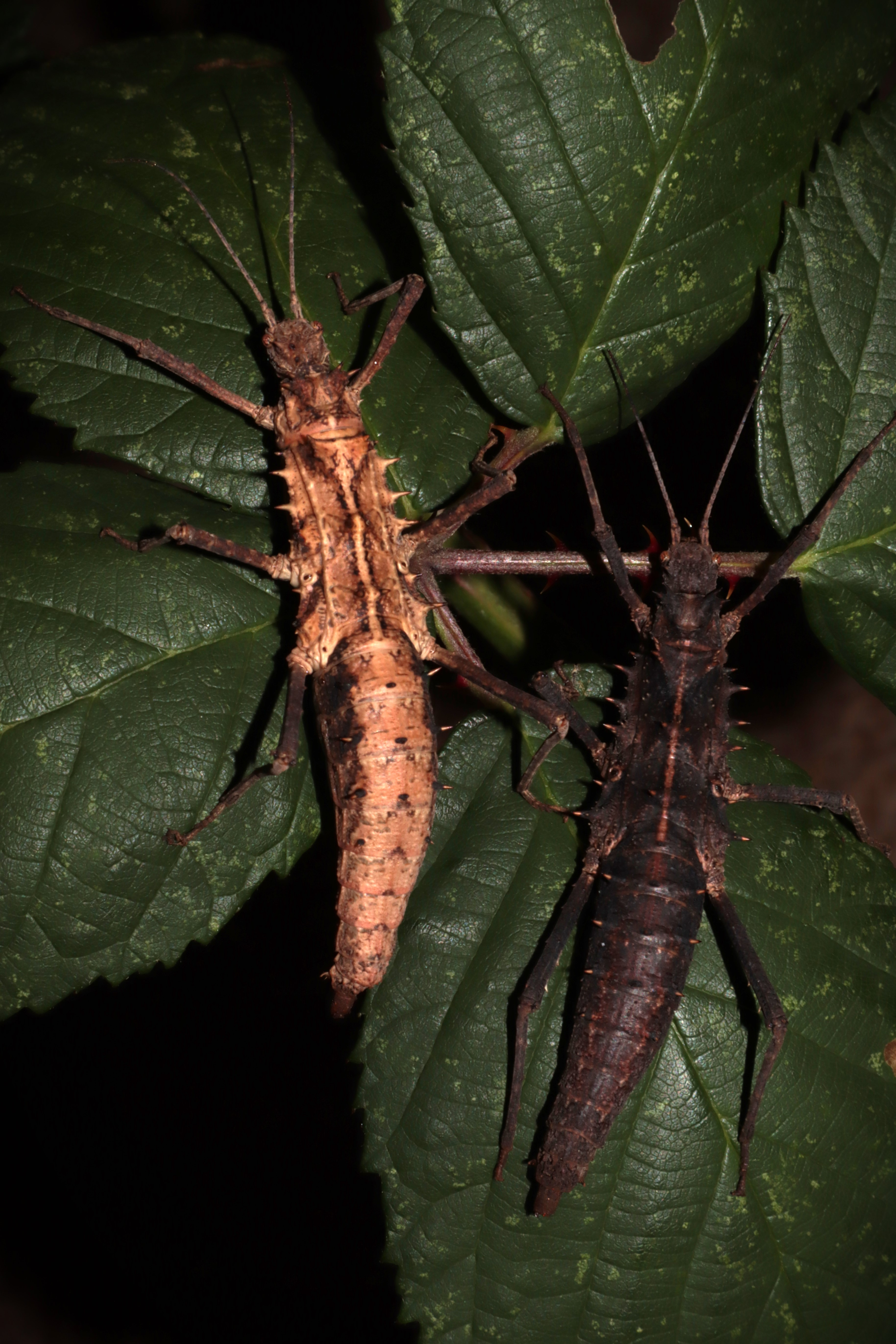
Different colored females of the breeding stock from Cagayan

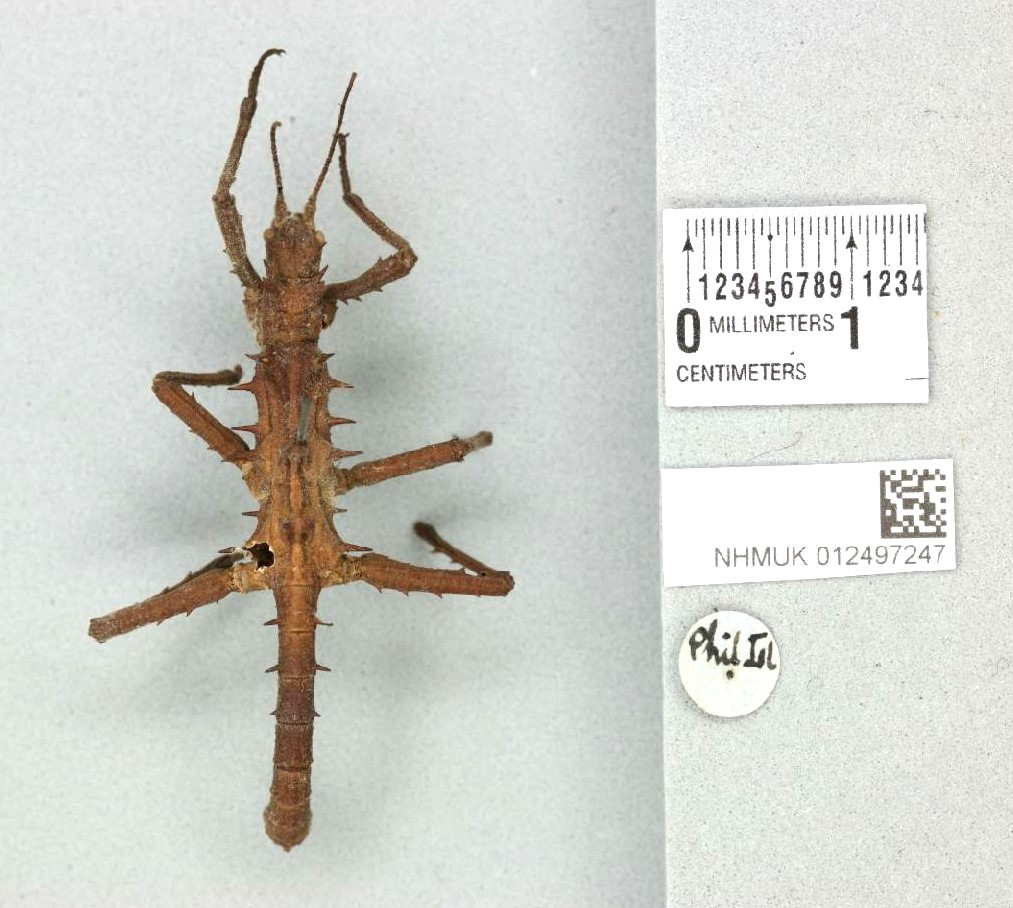
Male from the NHM from dorsal

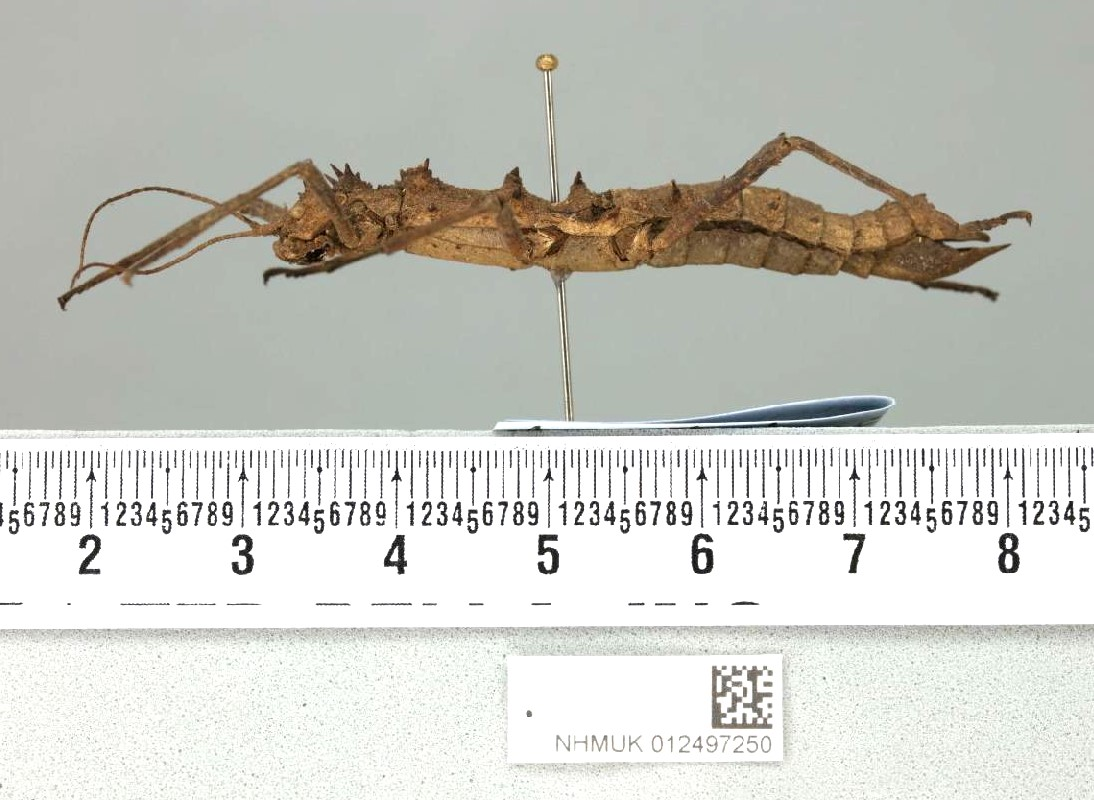
Female from the NHM from lateral
