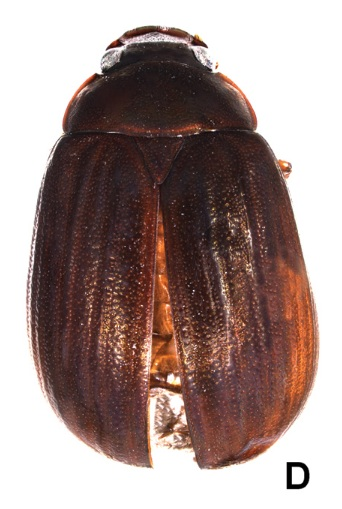

Scientific classification
- Kingdom: Animalia
- Phylum: Arthropoda
- Clade: Pancrustacea
- Class: Insecta
- Order: Coleoptera
- Suborder: Polyphaga
- Infraorder: Scarabaeiformia
- Family: Scarabaeidae
- Genus: Tetraserica
- Species: T. bachmaensis

Binomial name
- Tetraserica bachmaensis Fabrizi, Dalstein & Ahrens, 2019

= Tetraserica bachmaensis =

Species of beetle

Tetraserica bachmaensis is a species of beetle of the family Scarabaeidae. It is found in Vietnam.

== Description ==
Adults reach a length of about 10.1 mm. The dorsal surface is blackish and the ventral surface is reddish brown. The surface of the labroclypeus and the disc of the frons are glabrous. The smooth area anterior to the eye is twice as wide as long.

== Etymology ==
The species is named after the type locality, Bach Ma National Park.
