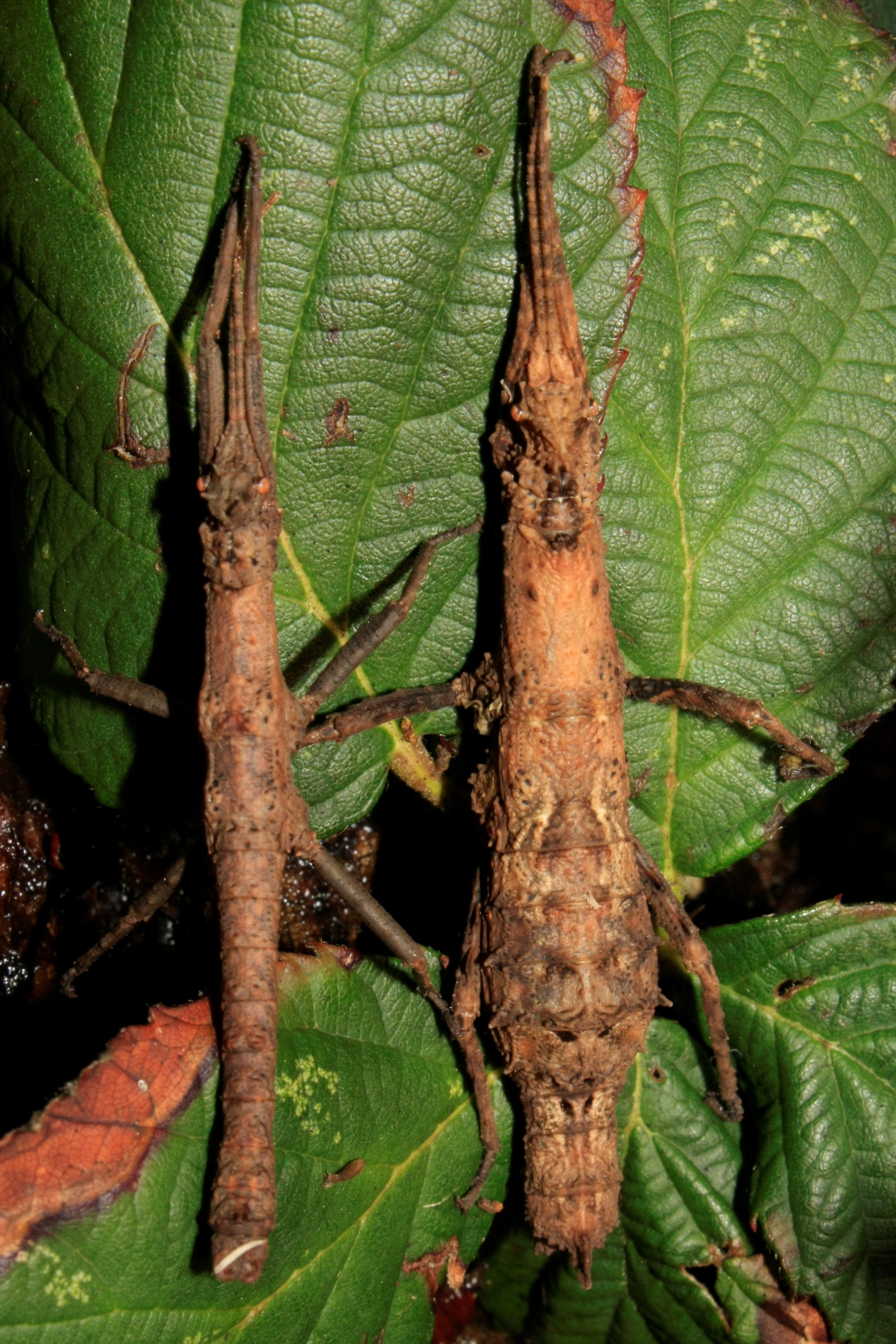
- Orestes bachmaensis, pair from Bạch Mã National Park

Scientific classification
- Domain: Eukaryota
- Kingdom: Animalia
- Phylum: Arthropoda
- Class: Insecta
- Order: Phasmatodea
- Superfamily: Bacilloidea
- Family: Heteropterygidae
- Subfamily: Dataminae
- Genus: Orestes
- Species: O. bachmaensis

Binomial name
- Orestes bachmaensis Bresseel & Constant, 2018

= Orestes bachmaensis =

Species of stick insect

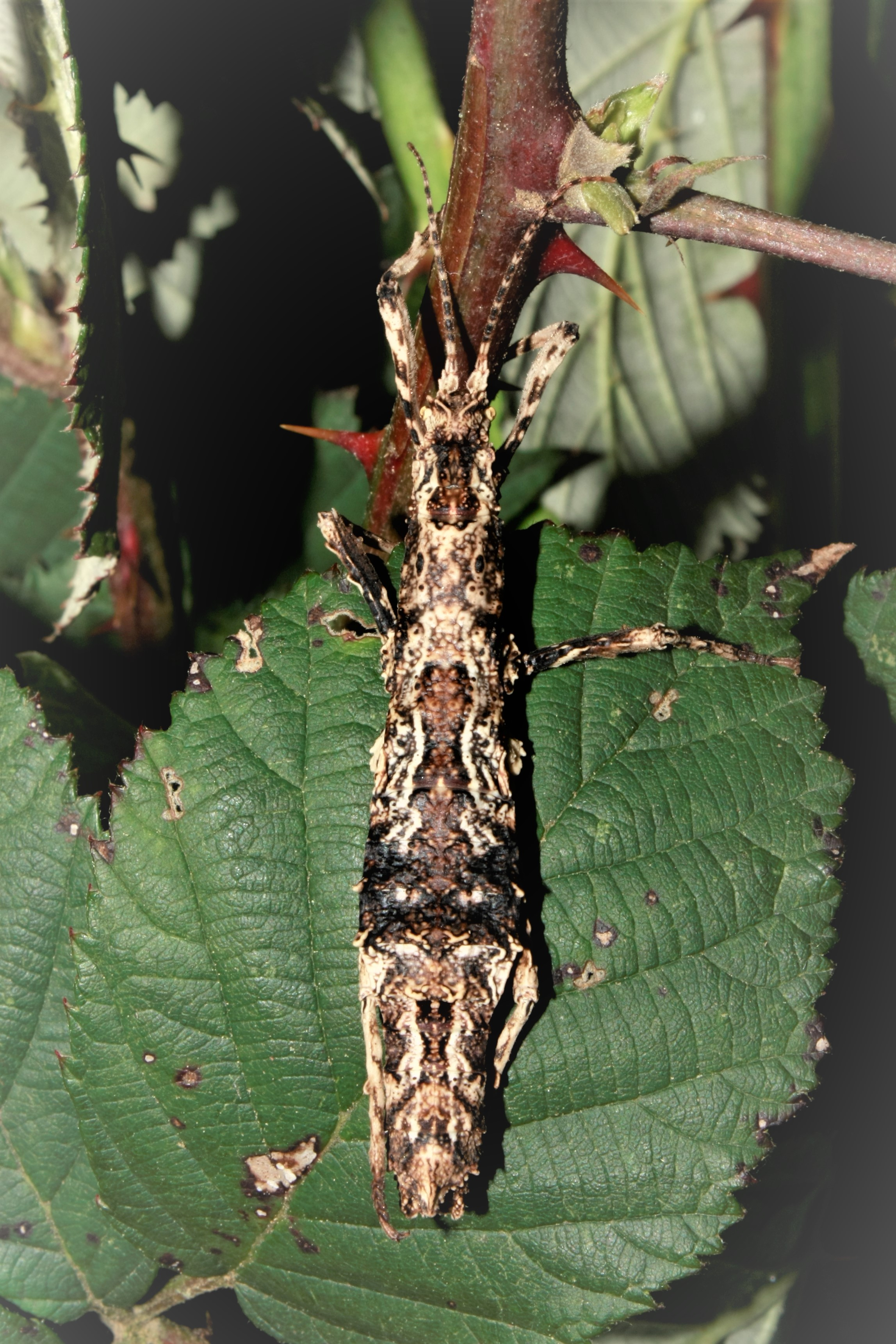
female from as Orestes sp. 1 'Ba Be' designated Stock, which is assigned to an as yet undescribed sister species of Orestes bachmaensis

Orestes bachmaensis is a Phasmatodea species native to central Vietnam.

== Characteristics ==
Males are around 35 to 43 millimetres (1.4 to 1.7 in) long and, typical of the genus, medium to dark brown in color. They have an indistinct hump on the back of themiddle and hind femura. The tergites of the abdomen are approximately the same length. The fourth and fifth tergites are slightly raised towards the rear. The species-specific spines located in front of and behind the eyes on the head are pronounced as follows (see also Acanthotaxy of Heteropterygidae). The supra antennals are clearly present as spines and are directed slightly outwards. They are followed by the smaller two pairs of the anterior and posterior supra occipital. The vertex is raised. The supra orbitals behind the eyes are located at the base of the ridge and are blunt. The anterior and posterior coronals behind it, as well as the unpaired central coronal are raised and connected at their base. The anterior coronals are lamellar and about as long as the central coronal, while the posterior and lateral coronals are only designed as small conical tubercles. Behind each eye, a distinct edge (postocular carina) extends backwards, where it ends in a conical tubercle. The antennae consist of 23 segments and are shorter than the fore legs.

Females are 44 to 51 millimetres (1.7 to 2.0 in) millimeters long. In addition to the typical brown tones, fresh adult females show contrasting patterns of almost white, dark brown and black spots. Characteristic is an elongated, strongly tapering ridge medial on the posterior ninth tergite of the abdomen. Also typical of the species are two laterally compressed and rounded teeth on the distal, outer abdominal ridges of the middle and hind legs. The structures on the head are designed as follows. The supra anantals, as well as the anterior and posterior supra occipital, are formed as blunt spines that become shorter towards the rear. The vertex is elongated and raised. The supra orbitals are clearly pronounced, laterally slightly flattened and blunt. The anterior coronals are laterally compressed and lamellar. Their anterior margins extend to the tip of the supraorbital. The centrale coronale is connected to the anterior coronals and is slightly raised. The posterior and lateral coronals are triangular tubercles. A row of three tubercles is located between the lateral coronals and the supra orbitals and further tubercles on the side of the ridge between the lateral and anterior coronals. Behind the eyes there is a distinct edge that reaches the rear edge of the ridge. The antennae, consists of 25 segments, are shorter than the fore legs. There are small tubercles on the body surface. The middle of the abdomen is clearly enlarged laterally.

== Distribution and way of life ==
The species is so far only known from the Thừa Thiên-Huế province in central Vietnam, where it was found in the Bạch Mã National Park and near a station of the Vietnam National Museum of Nature in the Phong Điền district.

Like all members of the genus, the insects are nocturnal and hide during the day. If they are touched or fall to the ground, they put their legs close to the body and align the antennae lengthways to the body, making them resemble a short, broken branch (phytomimesis). The individually deposited brown eggs are 3.6 millimetres (0.14 in) long, 2.7 millimetres (0.11 in) wide, 2.5 millimetres (0.098 in) high and have 0.3 millimetres (0.012 in) long hair on the egg capsule and lid.

== Taxonomy ==
- - Orestes subcylindricus
  - - Orestes guangxiensis
    - - Orestes sp. 1 'Ba Be'
      - Orestes bachmaensis

Relationships between Orestes bachmaensis and its sister species or stocks according to Sarah Bank et al. (2021)

Joachim Bresseel and Jérôme Constant found several males and females of this species in the Bạch Mã National Park on July 15 and 16, 2011. They collected another couple on the night of April 8–9, 2017 in the Phong Điền district. In their work on the genus Orestes published in 2018, they described this species as well as five others. The species name refers to the first place where it was found. One male was deposited as holotype in the Museum of Natural Sciences in Brussel. Another 41 males and 31 females, as well as eggs, are deposited as paratypes in various collections. In 2015 Bresseel and Constant collected similar animals in the Ba Bể National Park. The resulting parthenogenetic stock was initially called Pylaemenes sp. 1 'Ba Be' and since 2018 as Orestes sp. 1 'Ba Be'. These animals are representatives of an as yet undescribed sister species of Orestes bachmaensis, as initial genetic studies show.

== Terraristic ==
A sexually reproducing stock of the species can be found in the terraristics. It was distributed by the Dutch - Belgian working group Phasma and goes back to animals introduced by Joachim Bresseel and Jérôme Constant in 2011 from the Bạch Mã National Park in Vietnam. Until its genus reassignment and species description in 2018, it was named Pylaemenes sp. 'Bach Ma'. It is managed by the Phasmid Study Group under the PSG number 267.

The keeping and breeding of Orestes bachmaensis is unproblematic. As with other Orestes species, it recommends using a not too airy terrarium, for example made of glass. In order to ensure the necessary humidity for the animals and their eggs, a layer of always moist soil is suitable as a substrate. Leaves of hazel, bramble and other Rosaceae are eaten.

== Gallery ==
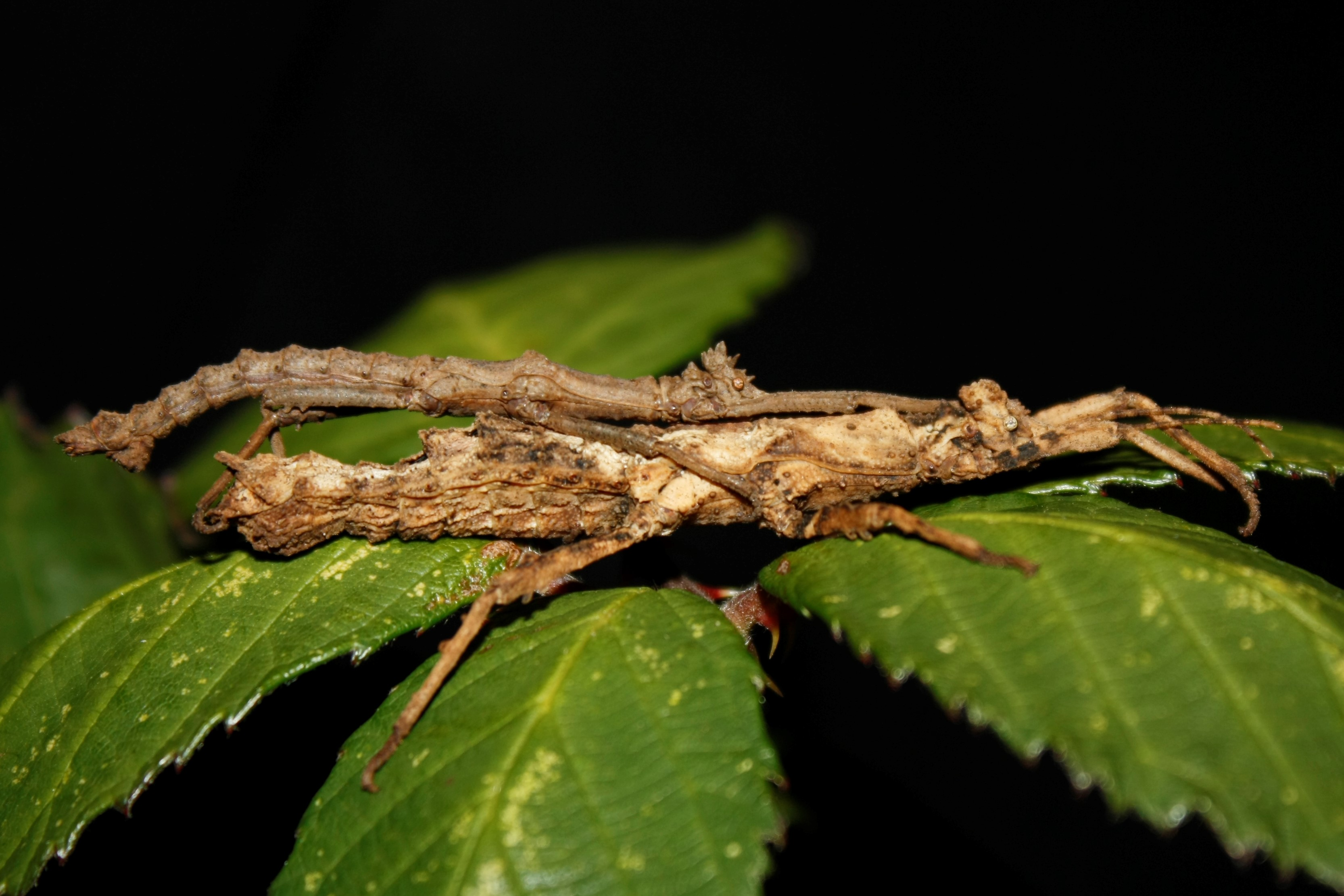
Pair

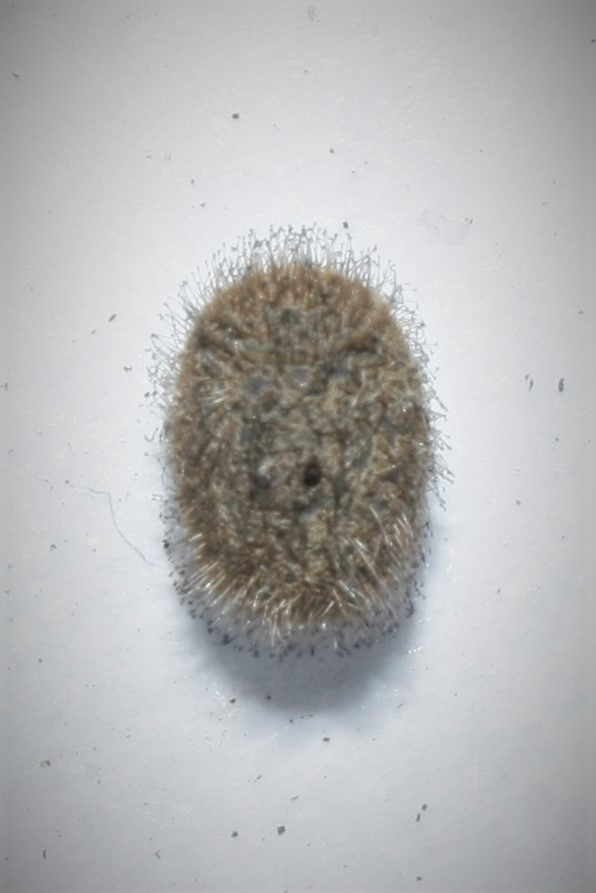
Egg

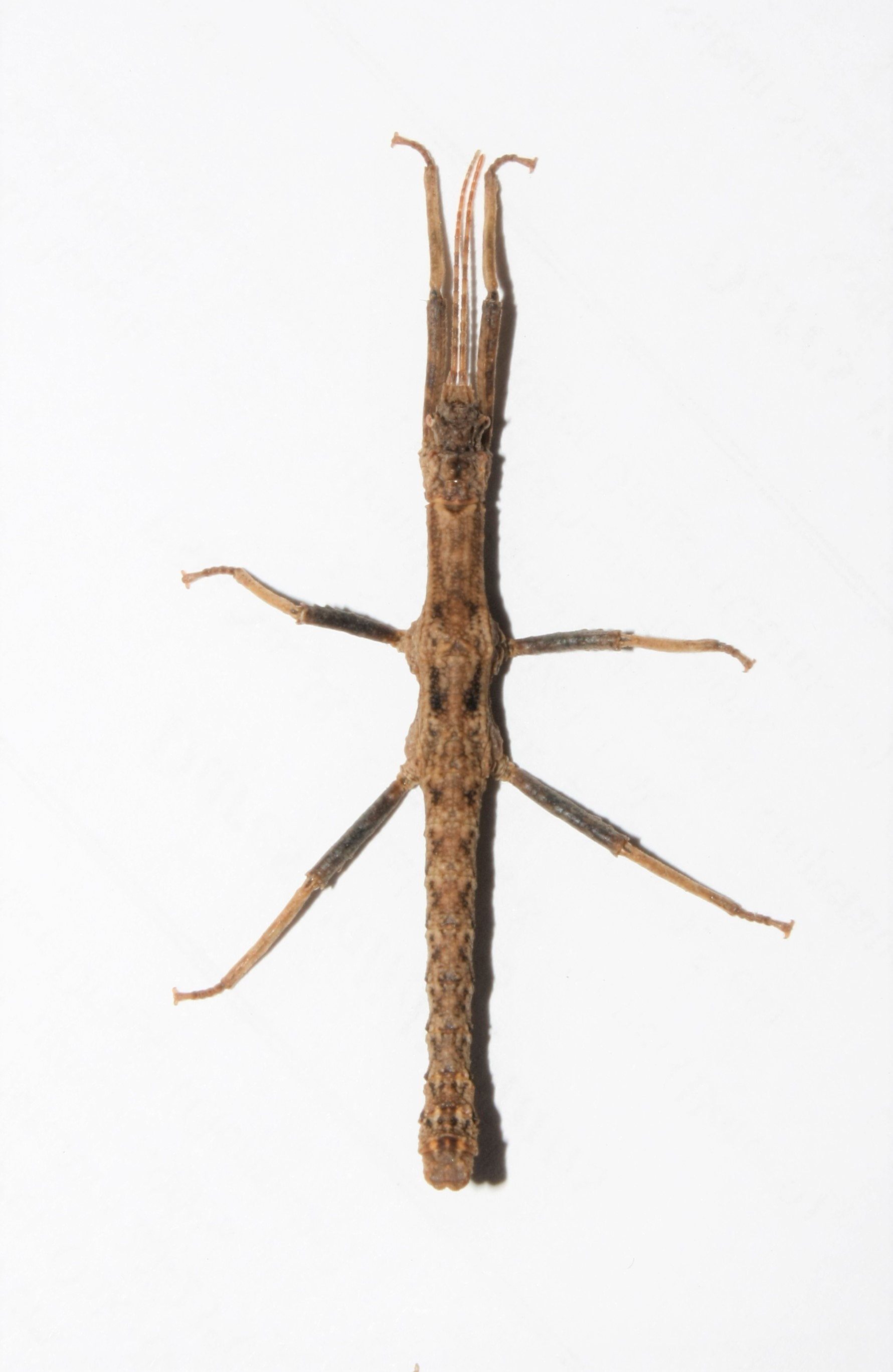
Male dorsally

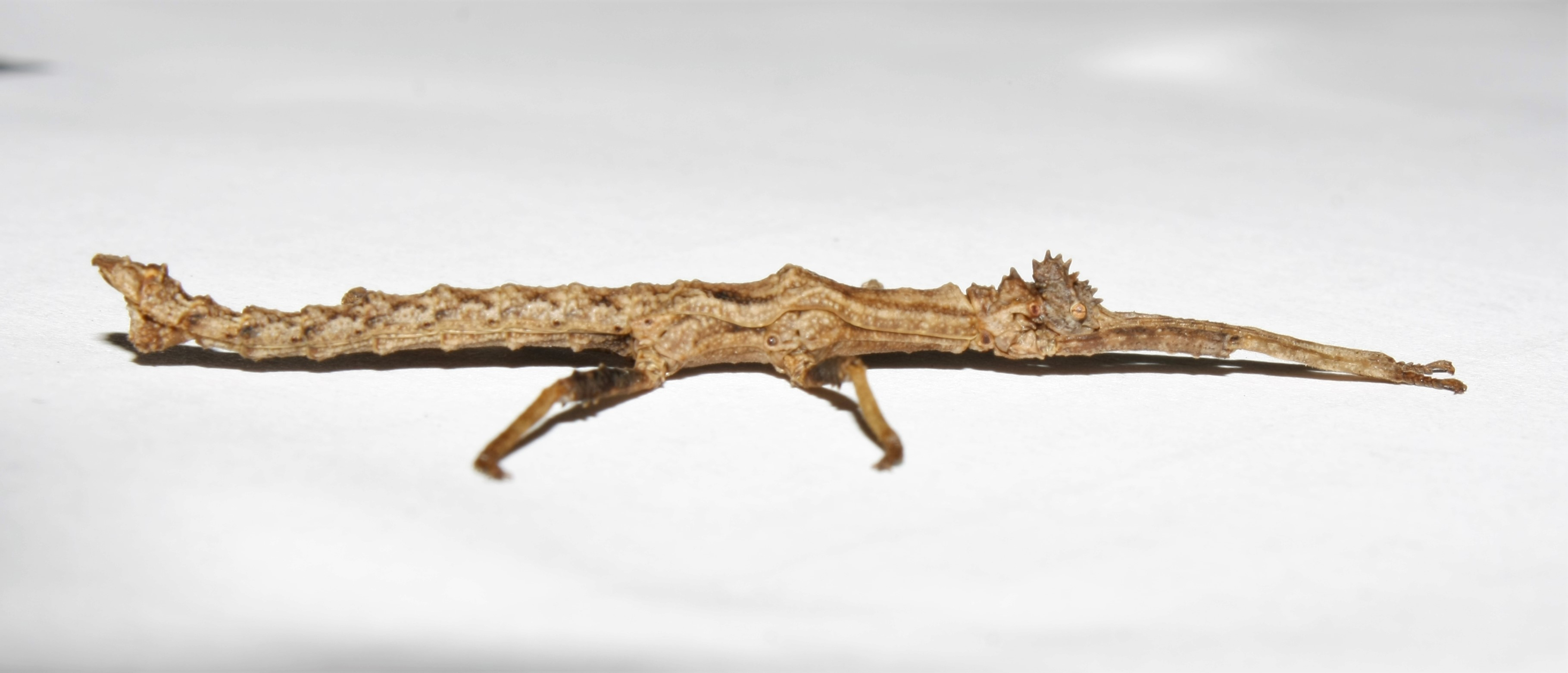
Male laterally

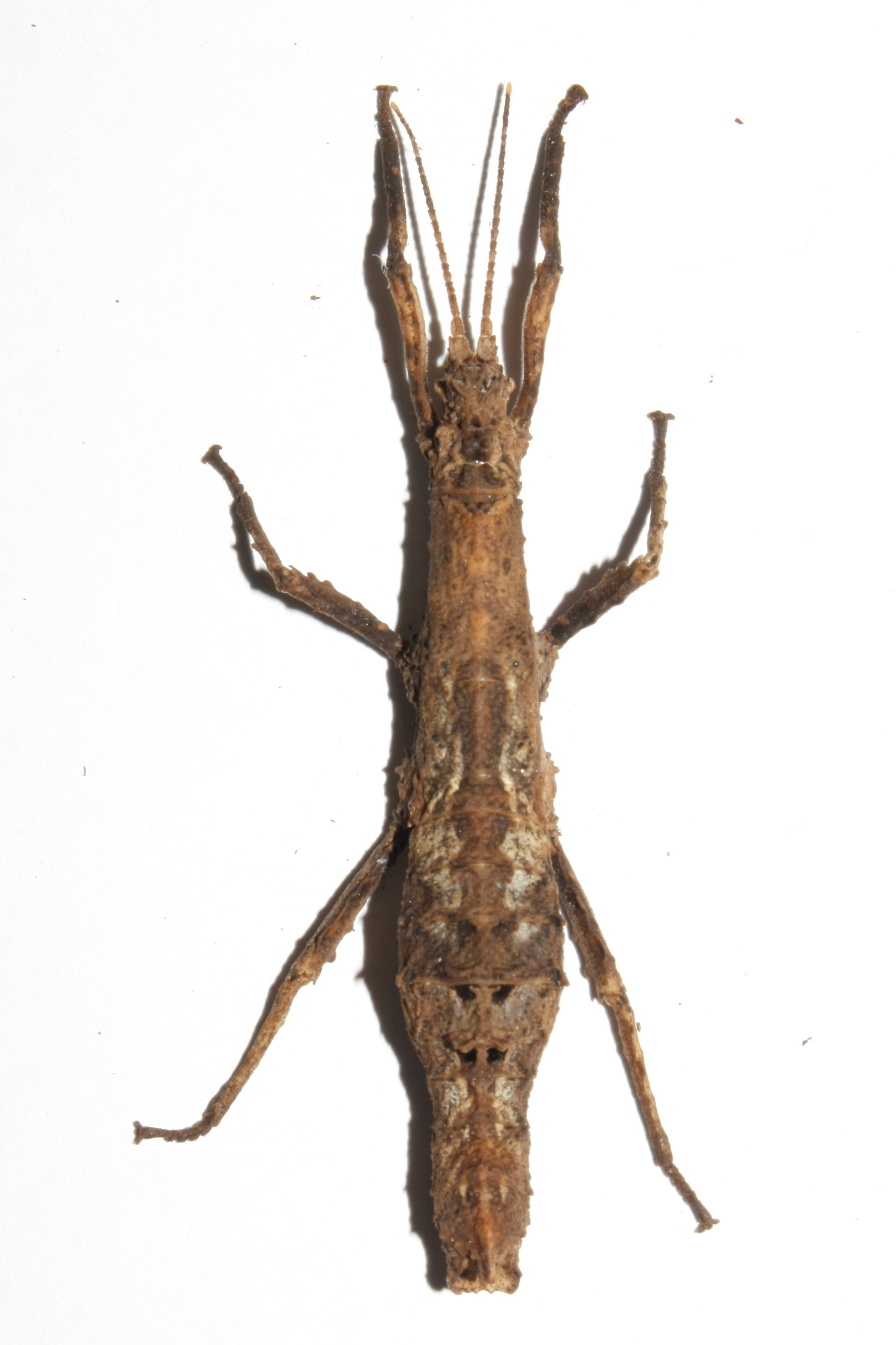
Female dorsally

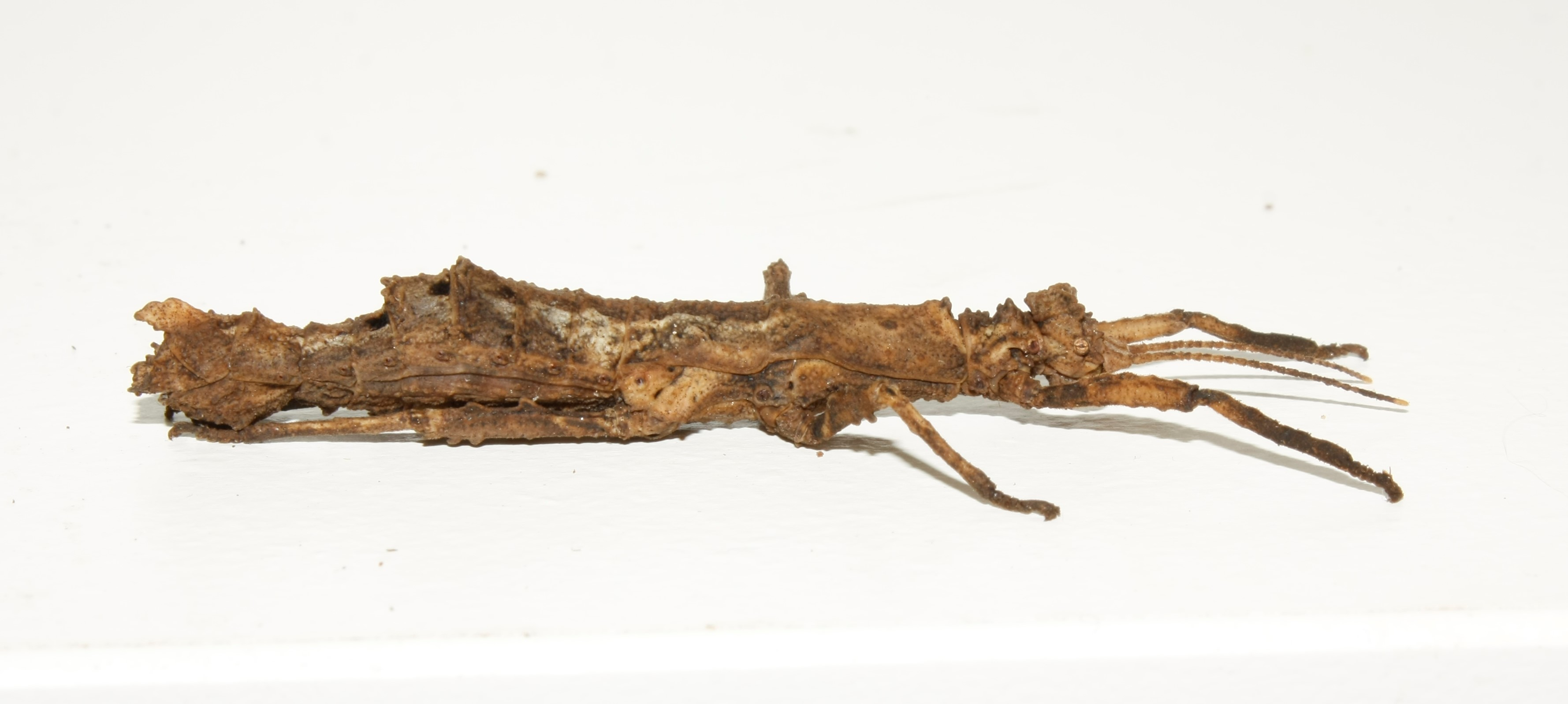
Female laterally
