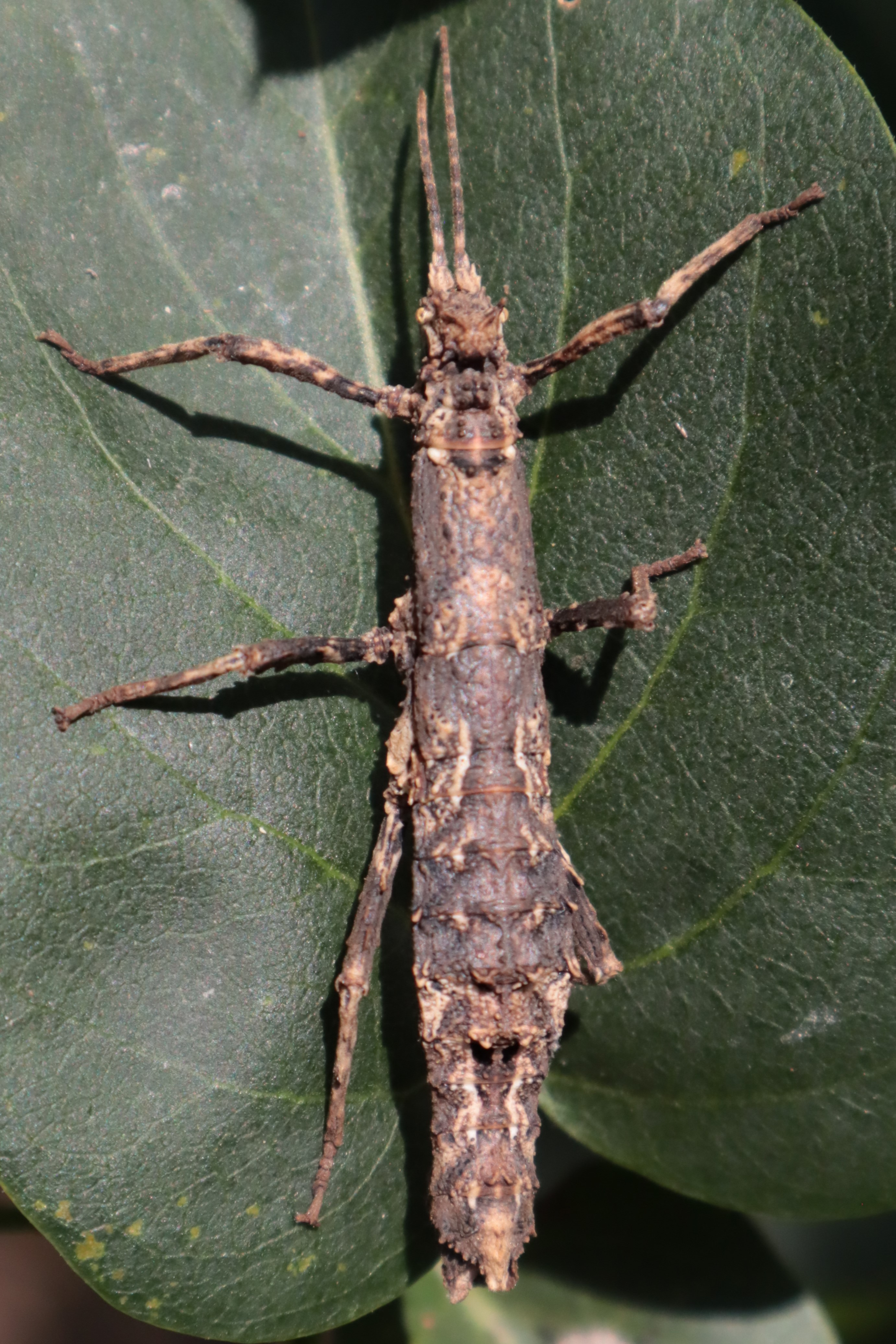
- Orestes subcylindricus, female from Mau Son in Vietnam

Scientific classification
- Kingdom: Animalia
- Phylum: Arthropoda
- Clade: Pancrustacea
- Class: Insecta
- Order: Phasmatodea
- Superfamily: Bacilloidea
- Family: Heteropterygidae
- Subfamily: Dataminae
- Genus: Orestes
- Species: O. subcylindricus

Binomial name
- Orestes subcylindricus (Redtenbacher, 1906)

Synonyms
- Dares subcylindricus Redtenbacher, 1906

= Orestes subcylindricus =

Species of stick insect

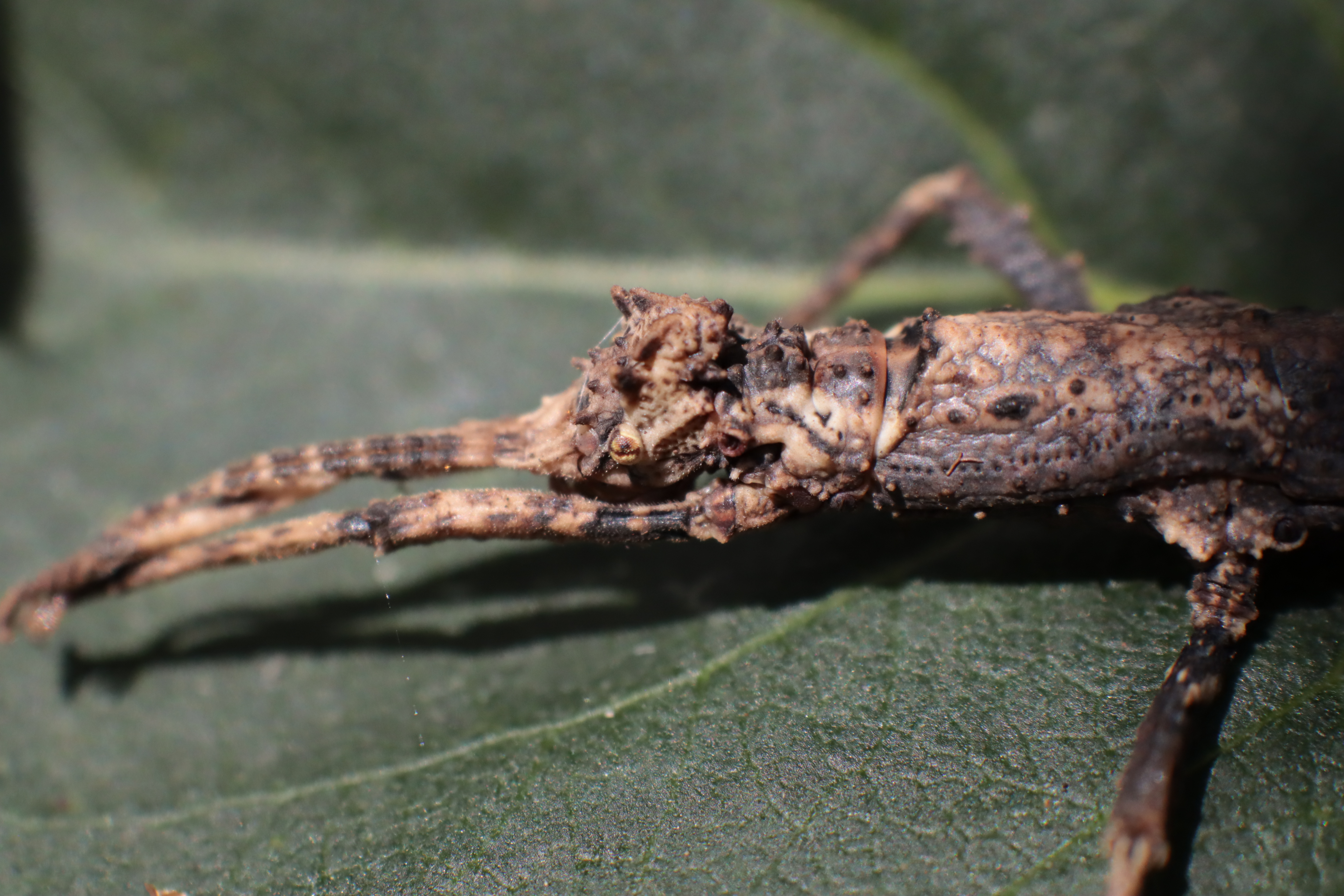
Portrait of a female from Mau Son

Orestes subcylindricus is a species of stick insects native to Vietnam.

== Characteristics ==
With a size of 39 to 43 millimetres (1.5 to 1.7 in) in males and 47 to 54 millimetres (1.9 to 2.1 in) in the females, the species is one of the largest of the genus. Only the representatives of "Orestes bachmaensis" almost reach this size. In Orestes botot the males can get a little larger with 44 to 45 millimetres (1.7 to 1.8 in), while the females with about 50 millimetres (2.0 in) remain slightly smaller than those of Orestes subcylindricus. Both sexes wear a distinctive but differently structured crest on their head.

Like most members of the genus, males are almost monochrome, medium to dark brown in color. In front of and behind the eyes there are usually paired, clear spines that show a species-specific expression (see also Acanthotaxy of Heteropterygidae). The three pairs of occipital spines are designed as follows. The anterior supra antennals are distinct but small spines and point slightly outwards. The two pairs of anterior and posterior supra occipitals behind it are smaller, with the anterior pair being the smaller. The vertex is raised. The paired supra orbitals behind the eyes are compressed laterally and triangular. The anterior coronals behind it are strongly flattened laterally, lamellar and about as high as the supra orbital. The central spine behind it (central coronal) is conical and about as large as the posterior coronals behind it. These and the lateral coronals to the side are designed as small conical tubercles. Beginning behind the eyes, a distinct edge (postocular carina) extends to the rear edge of the ridge, where it ends in a conical tubercle. The eyes are relatively small, circular and protruding strongly hemispherical. The antennae are shorter than the legs and consist of 23 segments. In addition to the development of the structures on the head, the formation of the fourth tergite of the abdomen is typical of the species. It is raised back towards the middle and two distinct tubercles are to be found on its upper side.

Females are relatively elongated and their coloring is dominated by beige and brown tones. It is complemented by patterns of almost white, dark brown and black spots, which lose contrast with age until the animals are almost monochrome brown. The crest on the head is clearly pronounced and raised. The supra antennals are short and conical. The anterior supra occipitals are formed as small conical humps, the posterior supra occipitals are smaller. The vertex is clearly raised. The suprao rbitals are laterally strongly compressed and lamellar. The anterior coronals are laterally compressed and lamellar-like in the direction of the supraorbital. The central coronal is only indistinctly present. The posterior and lateral coronals are designed as conical tubercles. Between the lateral coronals and the supra orbitals is a series of tubercles. On the side of the ridge there are additional tubercles between the lateral and anterior coronals. The postocular carina is clearly formed and its tip is recognizable as a triangular tubercle. As with the males, the eyes are relatively small, circular and protruding hemispherically. The antennae consists of 25 segments and are longer than the fore legs. In addition to the described structures on the head, pronounced spines on the legs are characteristic of the females of Orestes subcylindricus. In addition, the lateral edges of the fourth and fifth tergites of the abdomen are approximately parallel. The crest on the back of the ninth abdomen segment in the middle is clearly notched.

== Distribution area ==
The species is so far only known from the north of Vietnam so the part of the country formerly known as Tonkin. The holotype was collected near the Chinese border on Mount Mẫu Sơn in the Lạng Sơn Province at an altitude of 600 to 900 metres (2,000 to 3,000 ft). A male collected in 1927 in the Hòa Bình Province, which is deposited in the National Museum of Natural History, France in Paris, is also assigned to this species. Further animals are from 2010 in the Ngo Luong nature reserve (also province Hòa Bình), in the Cúc Phương National Park in the Ninh Bình Province and in the Tay Yen Tu nature reserve in the Bắc Giang Province.

== Way of life and reproduction ==
The nocturnal animals, like all members of the genus, are capable of an almost perfect phytomimesis by aligning their legs and antennae along their bodies and so hardly from a short broken branch are to be distinguished. The individually deposited brown eggs are 4 inches (100 mm) long, 3.1 millimetres (0.12 in) wide, 3.5 millimetres (0.14 in) high and have 0.3 millimetres (0.012 in) long hairs on the egg capsule and lid (operculum).

== Taxonomy ==
- - Orestes subcylindricus
  - - Orestes guangxiensis
    - - Orestes sp. 1 'Ba Be'
      - Orestes bachmaensis

Relationships between Orestes subcylindricus and its sister species or stocks according to Sarah Bank et al. (2021)

Josef Redtenbacher described the species 1906 based on a female nymph collected by Hans Fruhstorfer at Mount Mauson (correctly Mount Mẫu Sơn) under the name Dares subcylindricus. This specimen is deposited as holotype in the Natural History Museum Vienna. In 2004 Oliver Zompro recognized the proximity to the genus Orestes. However, he put the species together with Orestes verruculatus, the type species of the genus Orestes also described by Redtenbacher in 1906, as synonym to the older Datames mouhotii. At the same time he combined its species name with the genus name Orestes to Orestes mouhotii. While the holotype of Orestes verruculatus, also a female nymph, has the flat head typical of Orestes mouhotii females, this is not the case with the holotype of Orestes subcylindricus. In 2018, Joachim Bresseel and Jérôme Constant recognized Zompro's error and revalidated the species and formally transferred it to the genus Orestes (comb. nov.). They also described the females in detail with regard to the structures on the body surface (acanthotaxy), as well as, for the first time, males and eggs of this species using animals collected from them between 2010 and 2016. Furthermore, they identified the male collected in 1927 and deposited in Paris as Orestes subcylindricus.

As genetic analysis by Sarah Bank et al show, Orestes subcylindricus forms together with restes guangxiensis, Orestes bachmaensis and a still undescribed species from the Ba Bể National Park a common clade within the monophyletic genus Orestes.

== Terraristic ==
Sexually reproducing stock lines of the species have been in breeding since 2011. Initially known as Pylaemenes sp. 'Cuc Phuong' or Pylaemenes sp. 2. 'Cuc Phuong' designated stock of this species goes back to six males and four females, which Bresseel and Constant had collected in July 2011 in the Vietnamese in the Cúc Phương National Park. They left some of the collected animals to Rob Krijns, who was able to successfully have the species reproduce. Since the species was identified, the stock has been referred to as Orestes subcylindricus 'Cuc Phuong', stating where it was found. As Bresseel announced in 2023, he was wrong in identifying these animals. He only rediscovered the actual Orestes subcylindricus in 2021 at the type locality of the species in Mau Son. Since then, these animals have been bred parthenogenetically as Orestes subcylindricus 'Mau Son'.

The keeping and breeding of Orestes subcylindricus is comparatively easy. Among other things, leaves of bramble or other Rosaceae are eaten.
