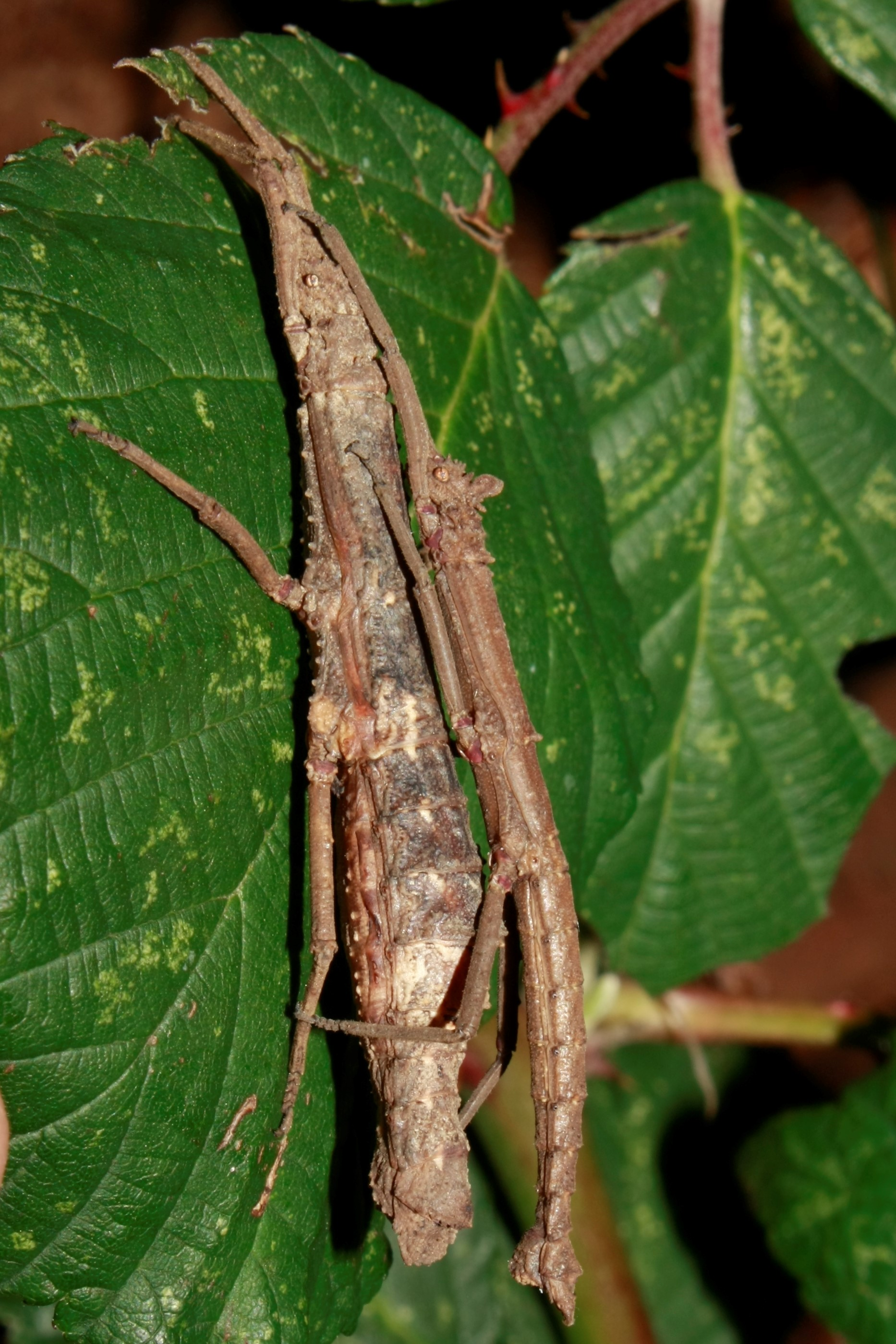
- Orestes mouhotii, pair from Kirirom

Scientific classification
- Kingdom: Animalia
- Phylum: Arthropoda
- Class: Insecta
- Order: Phasmatodea
- Superfamily: Bacilloidea
- Family: Heteropterygidae
- Subfamily: Dataminae
- Genus: Orestes; Redtenbacher, 1906

Type species
- Orestes mouhotii (by original monotypy of Orestes verruculatus)

Species
- List: Orestes bachmaensis; Orestes botot; Orestes diabolicus; Orestes dittmari; Orestes draegeri; Orestes guangxiensis; Orestes japonicus; Orestes krijnsi; Orestes mouhotii; Orestes shirakii; Orestes subcylindricus; Orestes ziegleri

= Orestes (insect) =

Genus of stick insects

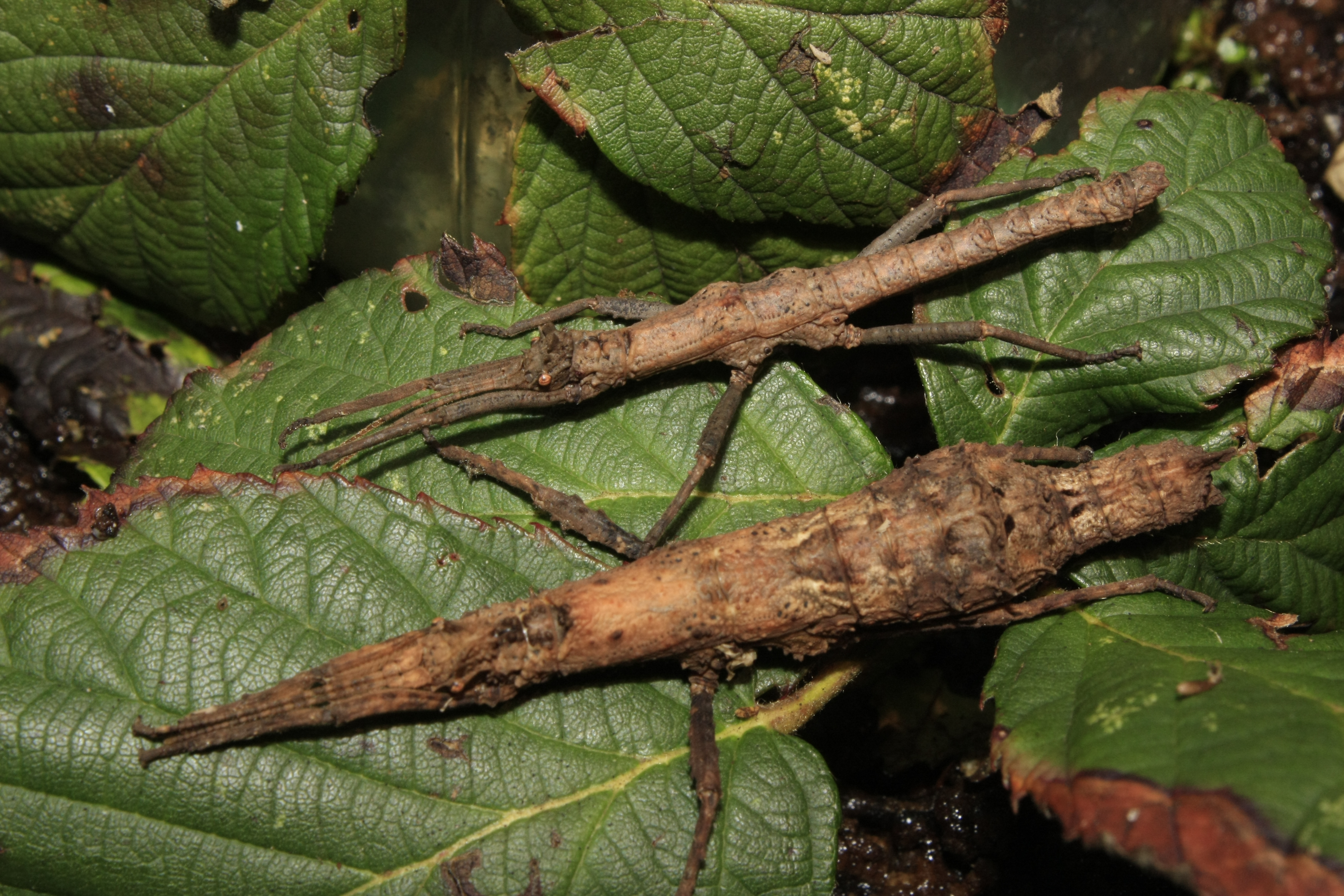
Pair of Orestes bachmaensis, initially as Pylaemenes sp. 'Bach Ma' introduced

The genus Orestes combines relatively small and elongated Phasmatodea species from Southeast and East Asia.

== Characteristics ==
The representatives of this genus are rather small with 3.2 to 4.5 centimetres (1.3 to 1.8 in) in the males and 3.8 to 5.5 centimetres (1.5 to 2.2 in) in females. Both sexes are always wingless and colored in different shades of beige to brown and often show high-contrast drawings with white areas, especially in younger females and female nymphs. Males are more of a single color in different shades of brown. The thorax is cylindrical or approximately cylindrical, unlike that of representatives of the genus Pylaemenes, whose meso- and metanotum is flattened or slightly roof-shaped, with a clearly raised central and two lateral longitudinal keels. The mesonotum of the Orestes females is slightly widened to the rear and there are often two lateral longitudinal rows of tubercles. The legs and especially the femura of the forelegs often have clear edges. The abdomen of adult, egg-laying females is clearly enlarged towards the middle. On the fourth and fifth segment there is a clear elevation and on the ninth there is a centrally seated, rearward-facing ridge. The last segment, called anal segment, unlike in Pylaemenes, is not strongly triangularly tapered backwards and notched at the end. As is typical for the Dataminae, they do not have an ovipositor to lay eggs. There are three rows of appendages on the head. These can merge to form a towering structure, which is typical of the species, such as in Orestes guangxiensis or Orestes bachmaensis. In other species they are reduced to the size of tubercles, which means that the head can be very flat, such as in Orestes mouhotii or Orestes draegeri. In the males, these structures are always formed as distinct areas formed into spines, spikes or, as in Orestes mouhotii and Orestes draegeri, into semicircular, ear-like structures (auricles). Their legs are shaped like those of the females. On the thorax there may be smaller bumps or several, sometimes long, spines on the metathorax as in Orestes botot or on the meso- and metathorax as in Orestes diabolicus are located. Overall, they appear in the habitus significantly smaller and slimmer than the females. In contrast to Pylaemenes males, their ninth abdominal tergite is not widened backwards.

== Distribution area, way of life and reproduction ==
The relatively large distribution area extends from Southeast to East Asia and extends from the Andamans, over Sumatra, the Malay Peninsula, Borneo and Singapore to Vietnam, Cambodia, Thailand and South China including Hong Kong to the south of Japan. Males are sometimes rare or not known and some of the species are at least regional parthenogenetic.

The nocturnal animals hide during the day in the leafy layer of the ground or behind bark. They are very lazy during the day and pretend to be dead when discovered. When touched, they drop to the ground with their forelegs and antennae stretched out and the middle and rear legs bent against the body, where they playing dead. The females lay only one to three eggs per week on the ground during their average one to two year life. These are 2.5 to 4.0 millimetres (0.098 to 0.157 in) long and 2.5 to 3.1 millimetres (0.098 to 0.122 in) wide and more or less hairy. The 7 to 15 millimetres (0.28 to 0.59 in) long nymphs hatch two to six months after egg-laying, depending on the species, and take between half a year and more than a year to become adult.

== Taxonomy ==
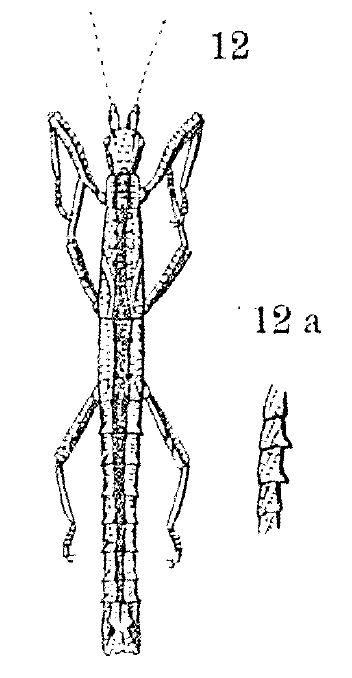
female nymph from Orestes verruculatus, image from Redtenbacher's first description of the genus from 1906

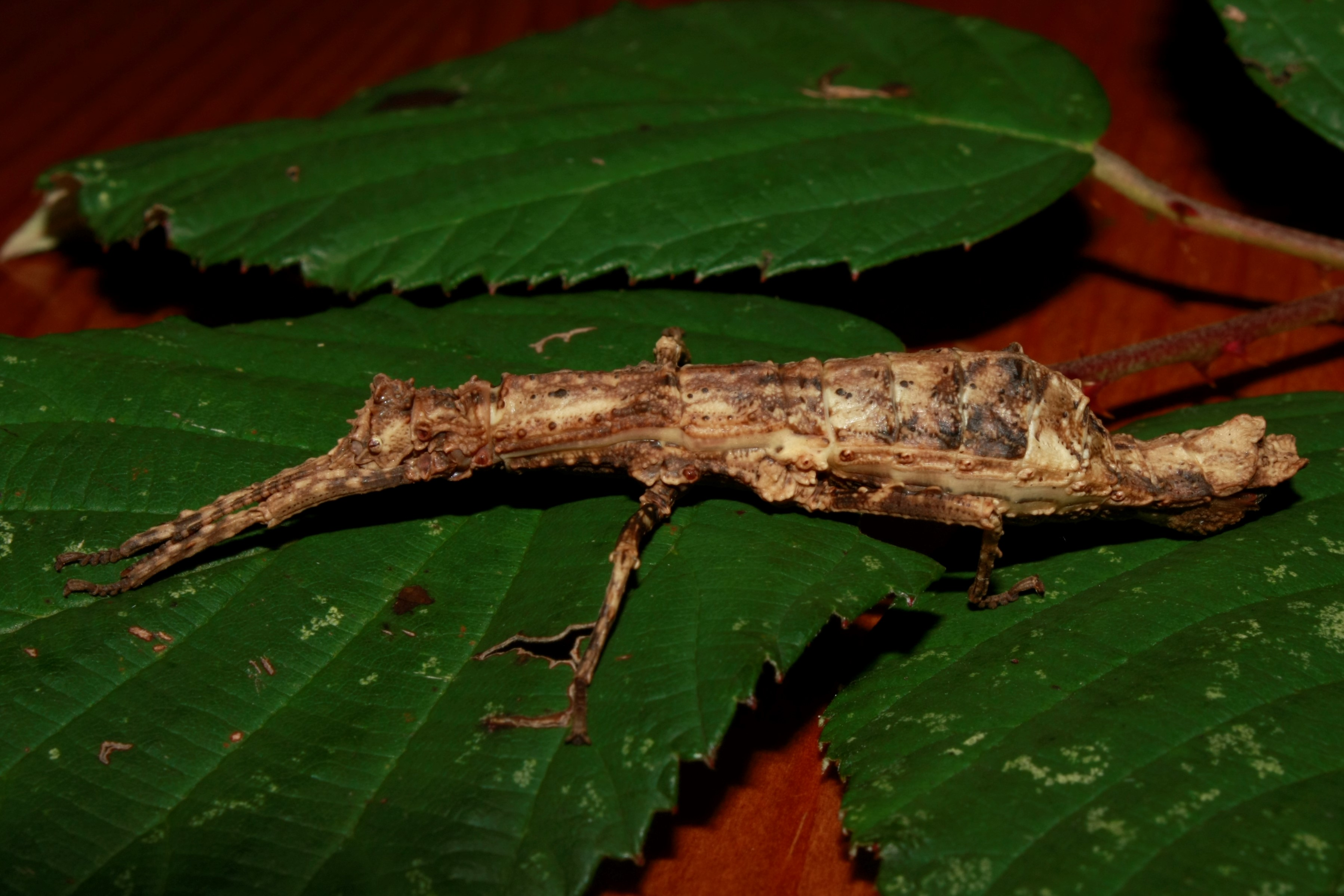
Female of a species described in 2016 as Pylaemenes elenamikhailorum which is part of Orestes according to their habitus

- Orestes
  - Orestes krijnsi 'Nui Chua'
  - - - Orestes sp. 'Cuc Phuong'
      - - Orestes guangxiensis 'Hong Kong'
        - - Orestes sp. 1 'Ba Be'
          - Orestes bachmaensis 'Bach Ma'
    - - - Orestes shirakii 'Taiwan'
        - - Orestes sp. 'Tay Yen Tu'
          - - Orestes japonicus 'Okinawa'
            - Orestes dittmari' Cat Ba'
      - - - Orestes sp. 'Andaman'
          - Orestes mouhotii ' Kirirom'
        - Orestes draegeri 'Dong Nai'
          = Orestes sp. 'Pu Mat'
          = Orestes sp. 2 'Bach Ma'
          = Orestes "mouhotii" (PSG 192)

Relationships of the genetic analysis examined Orestes species or stocks by Sarah Bank et al. (2021) Locations of the breeding strains supplemented according to Bresseel & Constant (2018)

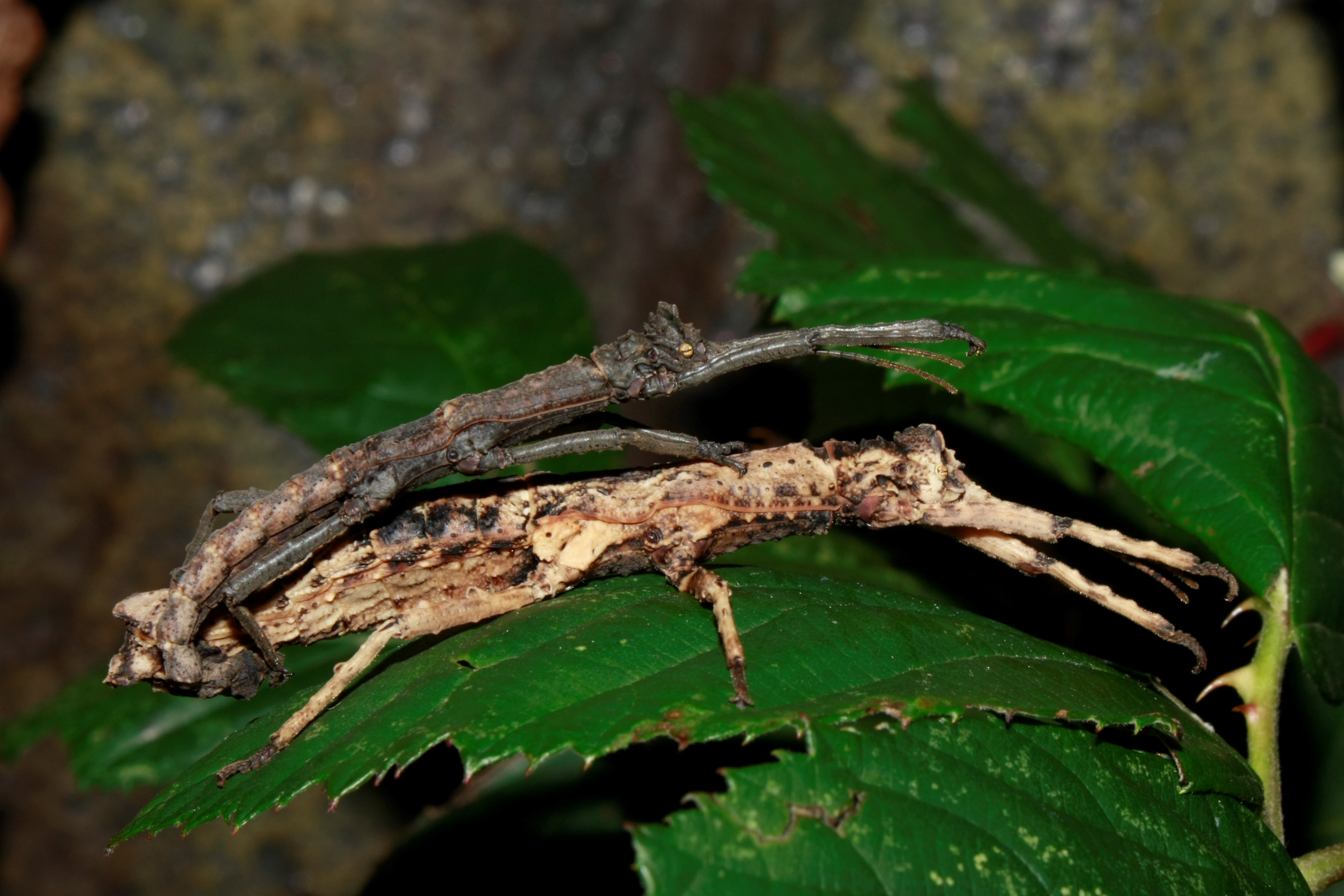
Pair of Orestes sp. 'Cuc Phuong', an undescribed species which was temporarily thought to be Orestes subcylindricus

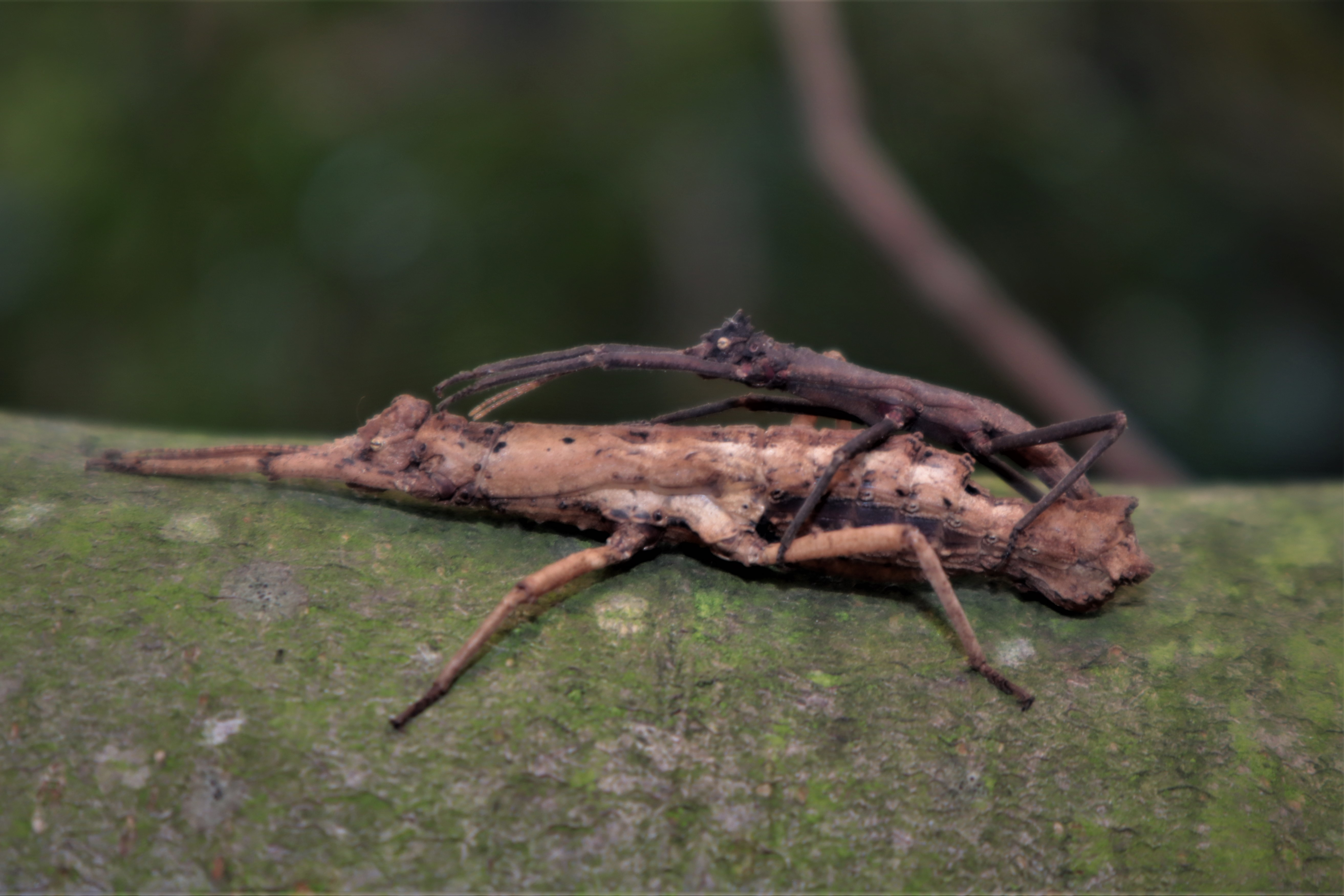
Pair of Orestes sp. 'Ta Dung'

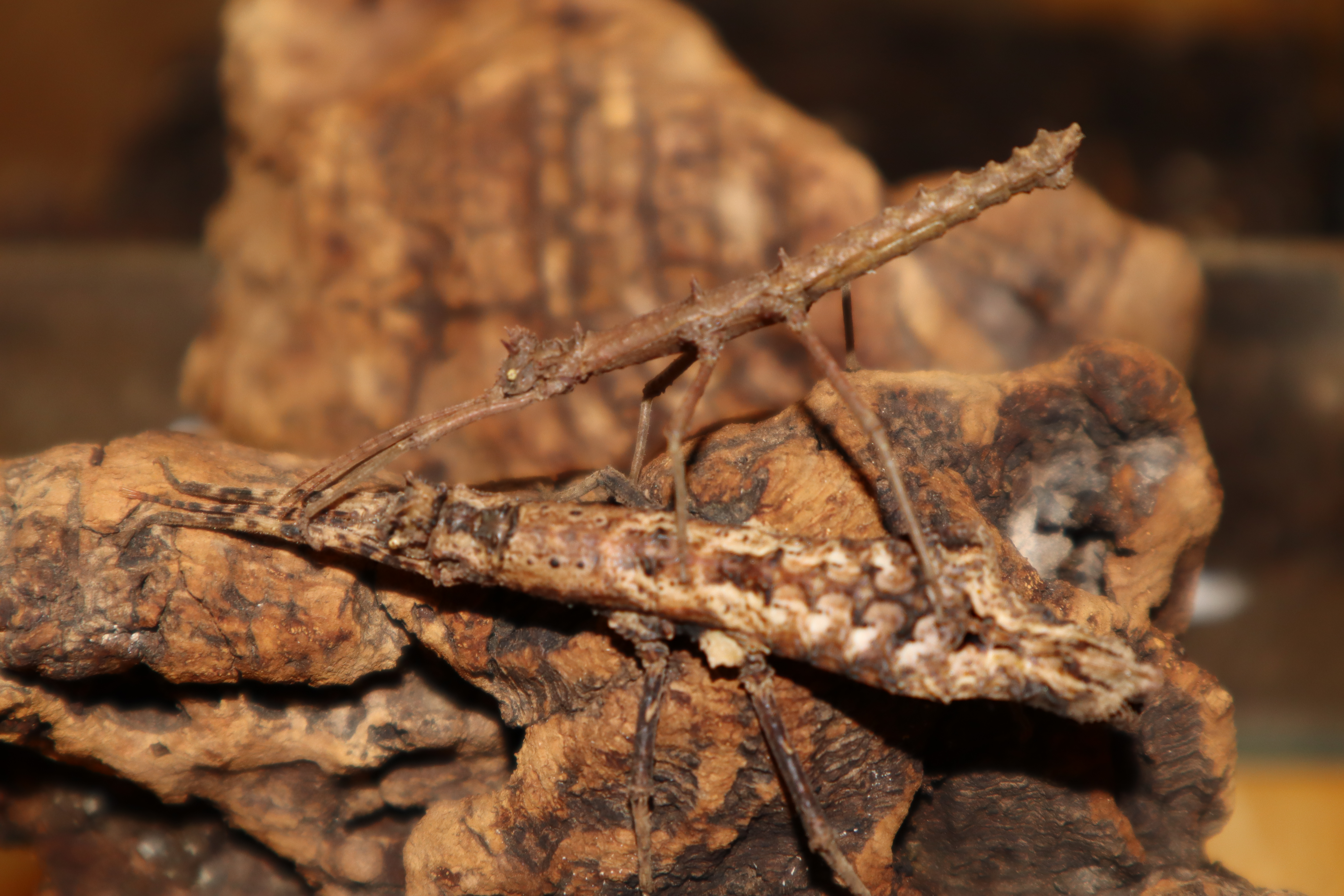
Pair of Orestes sp. 'Dak Nong'.jpg

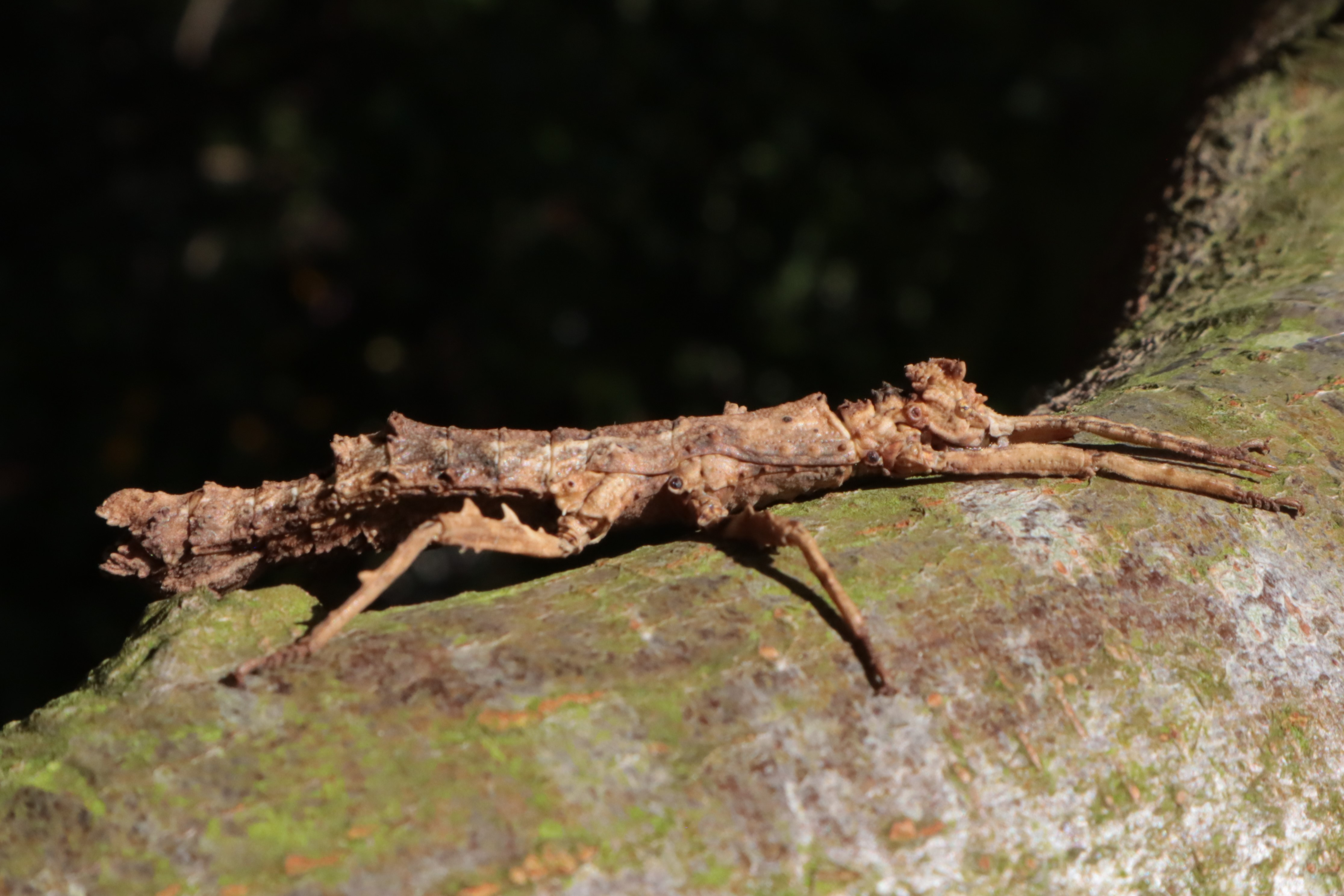
Female of Orestes sp. 'Ky Thuong'

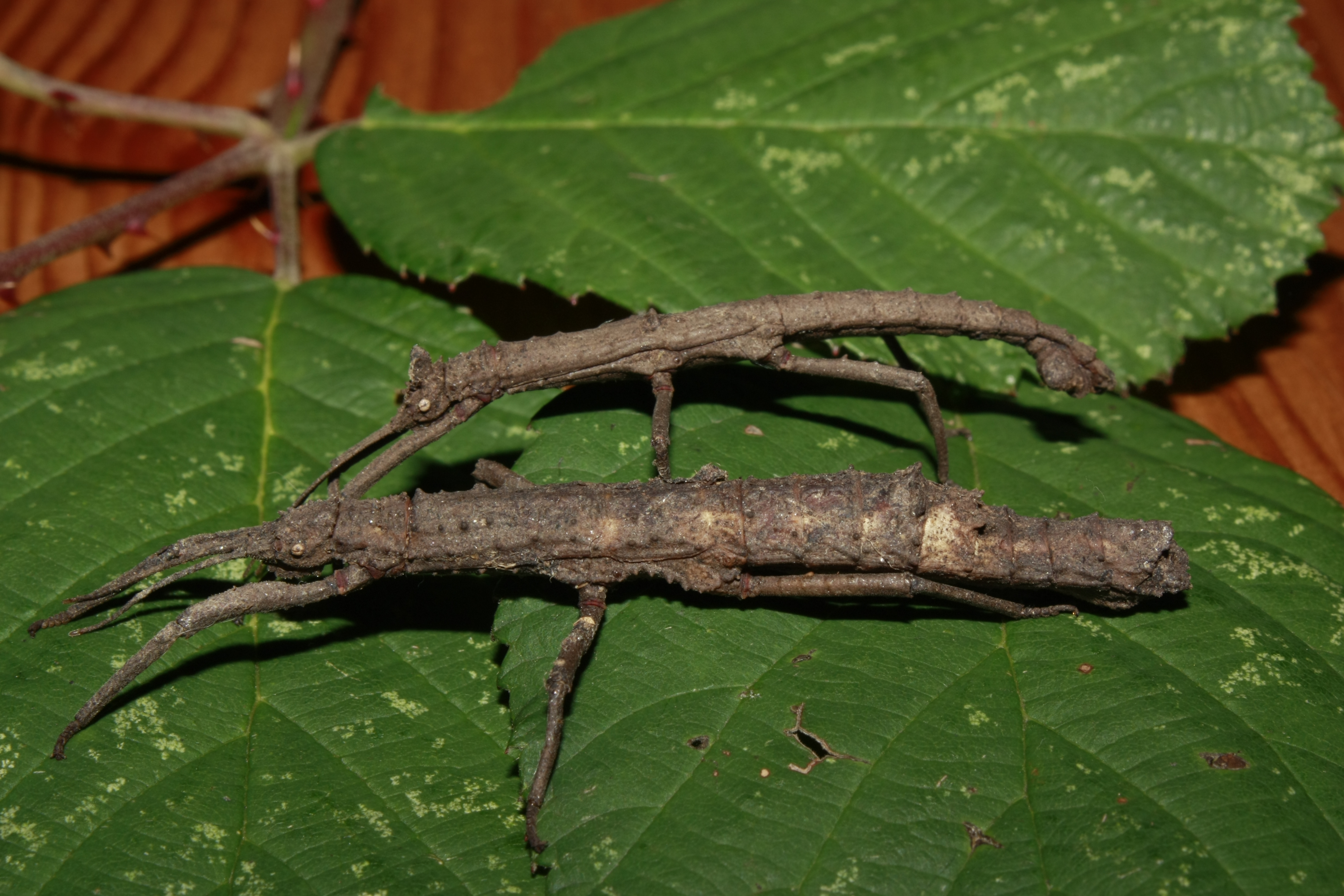
Pair of Orestes sp. 'Andaman'

The long time monotypic genus Orestes was established in 1906 by Josef Redtenbacher in the first description of Orestes verruculatus. The name of genus is derived from Orestes, a figure of Greek mythology and means in ancient Greek Ορέστης and thus literally "who stands on a mountain" or "mountain dweller". A species already described by Henry Walter Bates under the name Acanthoderus mouhotii in 1865, which was called Datames mouhotii or Pylaemenes mouhotii around 1999-2000, was named in 1999 by Ingo Fritzsche for the first time and later in the same year by Oliver Zompro and Fritzsche as Orestes mouho(u)tii. Although Zompro is the first author of one of the 1999 papers, in 2004 he prioritized a work he published in 2000 as the first mention of Orestes mouhotii. In addition, he synonymized several species with Orestes mouhotii, including the previous type species Orestes verruculatus. This made Orestes mouhotii or better its synonym Orestes verruculatus the valid type species of the genus. Whether Zompro continued to regard Orestes as monotypic is not clear from his work. The reason for this is the double listing of the Datames cylindripes which have been synonymized since 1934/35 (also today synonym with Pylaemenes oileus). On the one hand, he has this in the list of synonyms. On the other hand, he lists them in an identification key as Orestes cylindripes and thus as the second valid species transferred to the genus Orestes.

As part of the description of six new species from Vietnam, Joachim Bresseel and Jérôme Constant in 2018 introduced a new delimitation between the genera Pylaemenes and Orestes, which was confirmed by genetic analysis in 2021. In addition to the six newly described species, Pylaemenes guangxiensis, Pylaemenes shirakii and Pylaemenes japonicus have been transferred to the genus Orestes and Orestes subcylindricus, synonymized by Zompro in 2004, revalidated. A species described in 1999 by Zompro and Fritzsche as A species described in 1999 by Zompro and Fritzsche as Dares ziegleri was placed in the genus Orestes by Bresseel and Kawin Jiaranaisakul in 2021. According to the differentiation published by Bresseel and Constant in 2018, some species previously listed in Pylaemenes such as Pylaemenes elenamikhailorum described from Borneo in 2016 or Pylaemenes konchurangensis and Pylaemenes konkakinhensis, have to be transferred in the genus Orestes.

Valid species are:

- Orestes bachmaensis Bresseel & Constant, 2018
- Orestes botot Bresseel & Constant, 2018
- Orestes diabolicus Bresseel & Constant, 2018
- Orestes dittmari Bresseel & Constant, 2018
- Orestes draegeri Bresseel & Constant, 2018
- Orestes guangxiensis (Bi & Li, 1994)
  (syn. = Pylaemenes hongkongensis Brock & Seow-Choen, 2000)
- Orestes japonicus (Ho, 2016)
- Orestes krijnsi Bresseel & Constant, 2018
- Orestes mouhotii (Bates, 1865)
  (syn. = Dares fulmeki Werner, 1934)
  (syn. = Orestes verruculatus Redtenbacher, 1906)
- Orestes shirakii (Ho & Brock, 2013)
- Orestes subcylindricus (Redtenbacher, 1906)
- Orestes ziegleri (Zompro & Fritzsche, 1999)

In their work on the phylogeny of the Heteropterygidae, which was published in 2021 and was mainly based on genetic analysis, Sarah Bank et al. show, among other things, the position of the genus in the family as well as also the relationships within the genus. Following this work, the species from the Kirirom National Park in Cambodia which is in breed since 2015 is Orestes mouhotii. Its sister species is an as yet undescribed species from the Andamans. Both form a common clade with Orestes draegeri described in 2018. According to this work, Orestes draegeri includes other stocks collected in Vietnam and at least one stock from Thailand or West Malaysia that has been known for a long time under the name Orestes mouhotii. In addition to the species originating from the Andaman Islands, two other species not previously described have been identified as separate species.

== Terraristic ==
Several species as well as some undescribed or identified stocks of the genus are present in the terrariums of enthusiasts. The most widespread were long those listed by the Phasmid Study Group under PSG number 192 and assigned to Orestes mouhotii, as well as Orestes guangxiensis listed under PSG number 248. Both have been held since around the late 1990s. While Orestes guangxiensis is only parthenogenetically bred, the species listed under PSG number 192 was briefly kept as a sexual strain from Thailand around 2000.

Another purely parthenogenic stock, which was imported from the north of Taiwan in 2008, was temporarily referred to as Pylaemenes guangxiensis 'Taiwan'. This species is in fact Orestes shirakii described in 2013 in the genus Pylaemenes.

Various other breeding stocks were imported by the Dutch - Belgian working group Phasma, most of which were collected by Joachim Bresseel and Jérôme Constant in Vietnam and were brought into breeding with varying degrees of success. Three sexual and one parthenogenic stock were described by Bresseel and Constant in 2018. On the one hand, this was a 2011 in Bạch Mã National Park collected and after this location Pylaemenes sp. 'Bach Ma' called sexual stock. It is listed under PSG number 267 and has been described as Orestes bachmaensis. Another species is Orestes draegeri collected in Dong Nai in 2012, which is listed under PSG number 397 and was initially called Pylaemenes sp. 'Dong Nai'. According to more recent studies, the stocks of PSG number 192 from Thailand and West Malaysia, originally kept as Orestes mouhotii, can be assigned to this species. The closely related, real Orestes mouhotii has been in breeding in both sexes from the Kirirom National Park in Cambodia since 2015. The third sexually breeding species is Orestes krijnsi, which was found in 2014 in the Núi Chúa National Park and initially called Pylaemenes sp. 'Nui Chua'. As Orestes dittmari a parthenogenetically breeding stck was described, which was found in 2013 in the Cát Bà National Park. The species Orestes subcylindricus, which has been valid again since 2018, was initially assumed to have been collected in 2011 in the Cúc Phương National Park. The resulting stock is sexually in bred. As Bresseel announced in 2023, these animals belong to a different, as yet undescribed species. The real Orestes subcylindricus was only collected in 2021 by Bresseel and Constant in Mau Son, Vietnam, near the type locality, and has been bred parthenogenetically since then.

In addition, further parthenogenetic stocks of Orestes draegeri have been imported from Vietnam by Bresseel and Constant, for example in 2015 from the Ba Bể National Park and the Melinh biodiversity station, 2017 from the Bạch Mã National Park and 2017 from the Pù Mát National Park. They imported parthenogenic stocks of still undescribed species in 2013 from the Tay Yen Tu nature reserve, in 2015 from the National Park Ba Bể and in 2018 from the Chu Mom Ray National Park, which corresponds closely to the description of Dares ziegleri. Sexual stocks were also imported from Kẻ Gỗ Nature Reserve and from Kon Ka Kinh National Park in 2018. The latter, together with two sexually bred species collected in 2019 in Đắk Nông and Ta Dung, are among the smallest known representatives of the genus to date. Two other species collected in 2019 in Kong Plong were also sexually bred. One of the stocks from Kong Plong closely resembles a species described in 2018 as Pylaemenes konchurangensis and was therefore named by Bresseel as Orestes cf. konchurangensis. From the animals collected in 2022, three further sexual breeding strains were established, two from the Vũ Quang and one from Xuan Lien. Living imported to Europe, but no longer in breeding are stocks from the following localities: Bidoup Núi Bà National Park (2014), Phước Bình National Park (two stocks 2014) and Phuong Dien (2017). Another sexual breeding stock that based to a female collected in July 2016 in the Ngo Luong nature reserve was initially called Orestes sp. 'Ngo Luong'. In 2020 Bresseel and Constant described the species in a newly established genus as Microrestes robustus.

Another sexual stock from Japan has been kept and bred by European breeders since 2013. It was collected by Kazuhisa Kuribayashi on Okinawa and initially referred to as Pylaemenes guangxiensis by him. Elsewhere it was named Pylaemenes sp. 'Okinawa (Iceland)'. In 2018, Bresseel and Constant recognized his affiliation with Orestes japonicus. Also in 2013 Elena Tkacheva and Mikhail Berezin collected a species belonging to Orestes in Borneo, more precisely in Sepilok, which was described in 2016 as Pylaemenes elenamikhailorum. Since its discovery, it has been kept as a sexual breeding stock in Russia and temporarily in Germany in 2020. From the Andamans, a sexual stock collected by Christoph Röhrs has been in breeding since 2018, whose representatives have been identified as sister species to Orestes mouhotii.

== Gallery ==
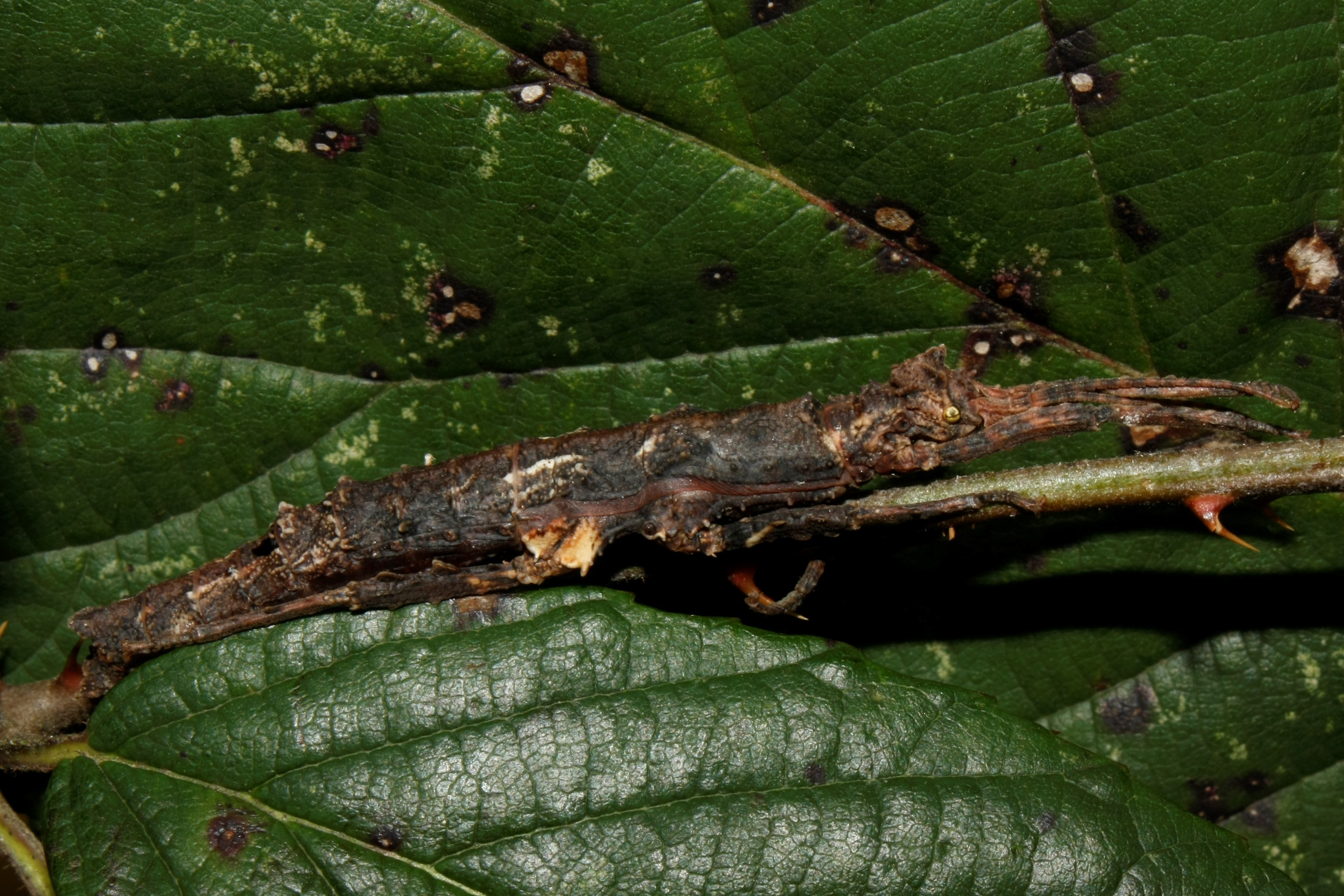
Female of a species, called Orestes sp. 1 'Ba Be (National Park)'

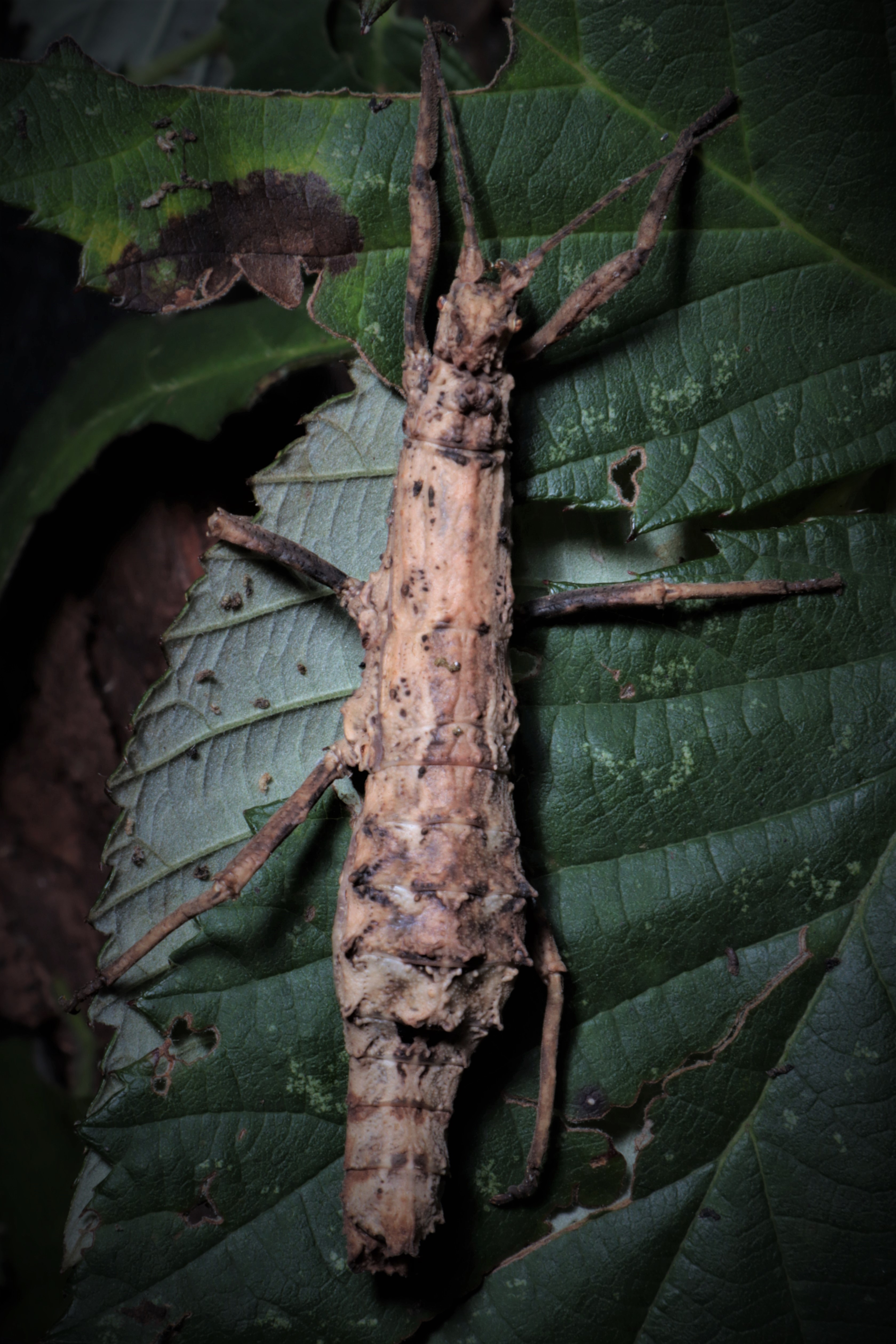
Female of a species, called Orestes sp. 'Chu Mom Ray'

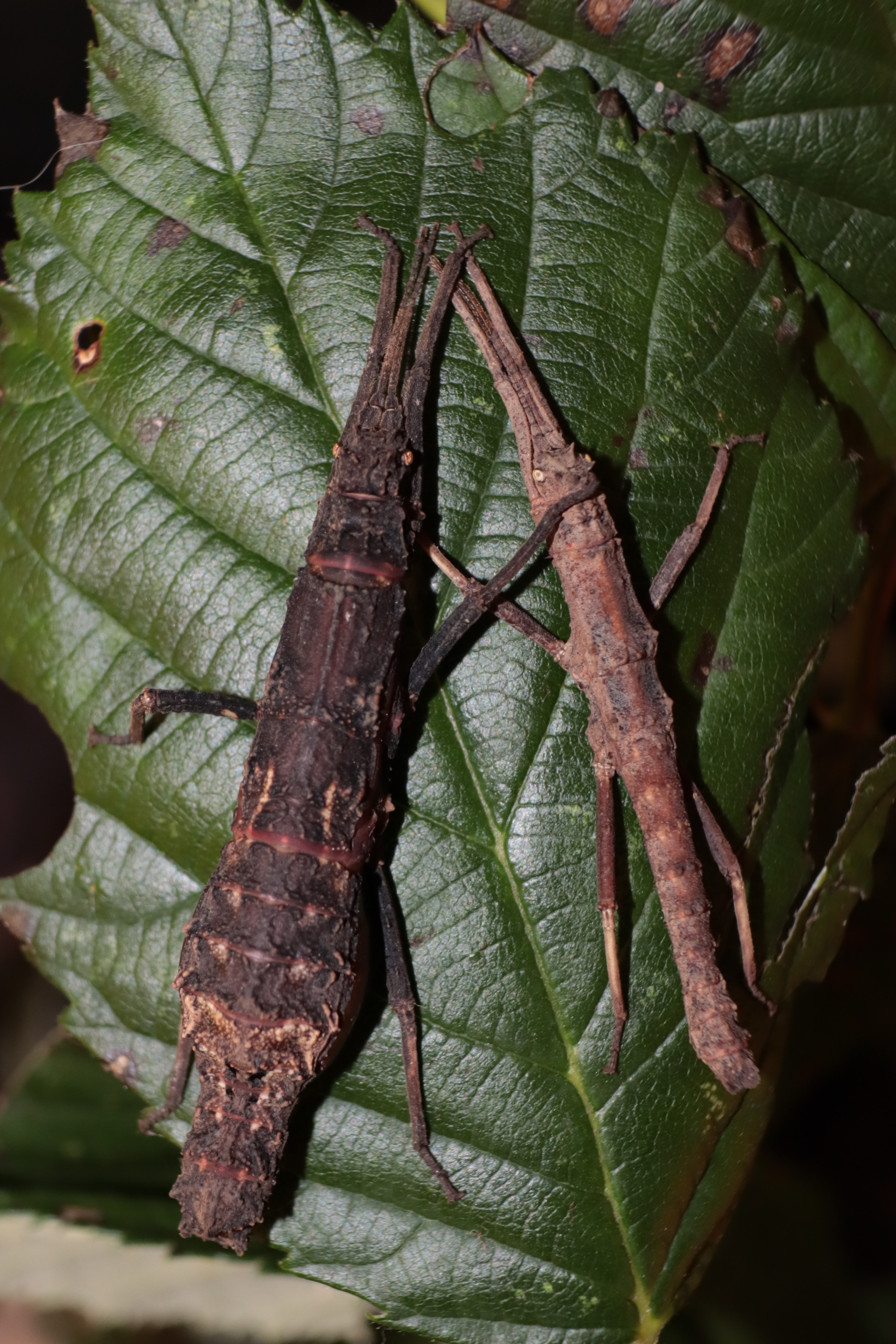
Pair of a species, called Orestes sp. 'Kon Ka Kinh'

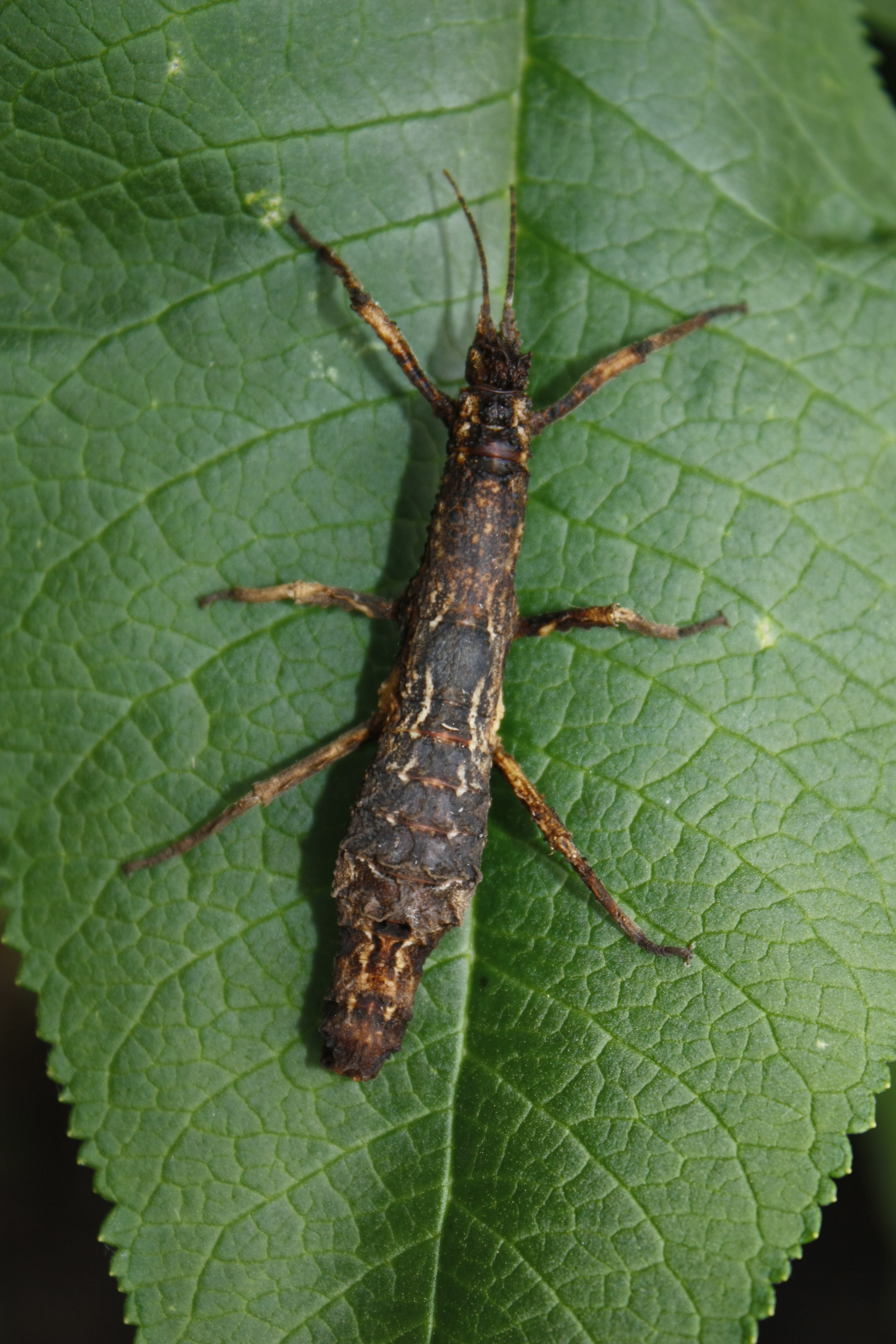
Female of a species, called Orestes sp. 'Tay Yen Tu'

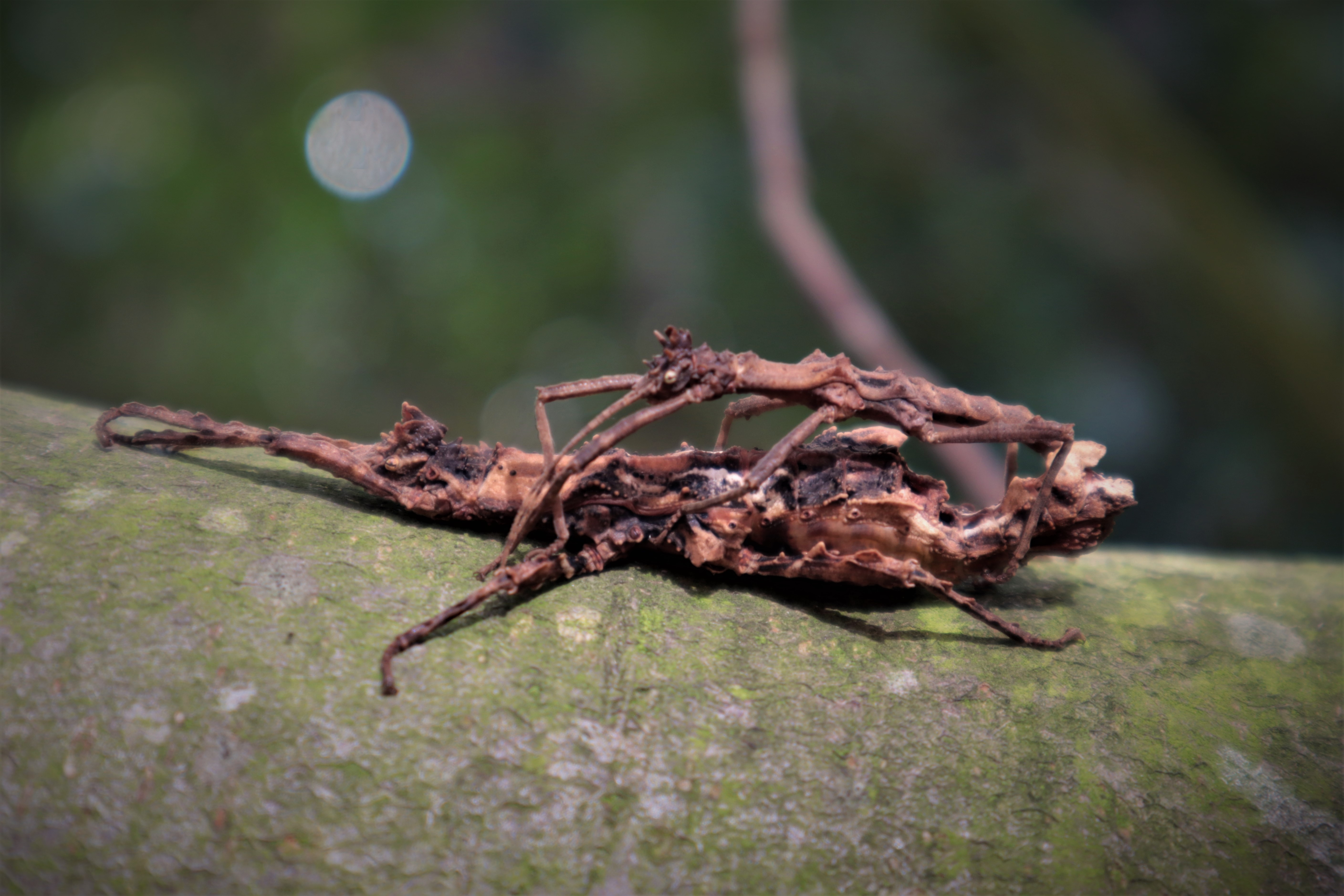
Pair of a species, called Orestes sp. 'Kong Plong'

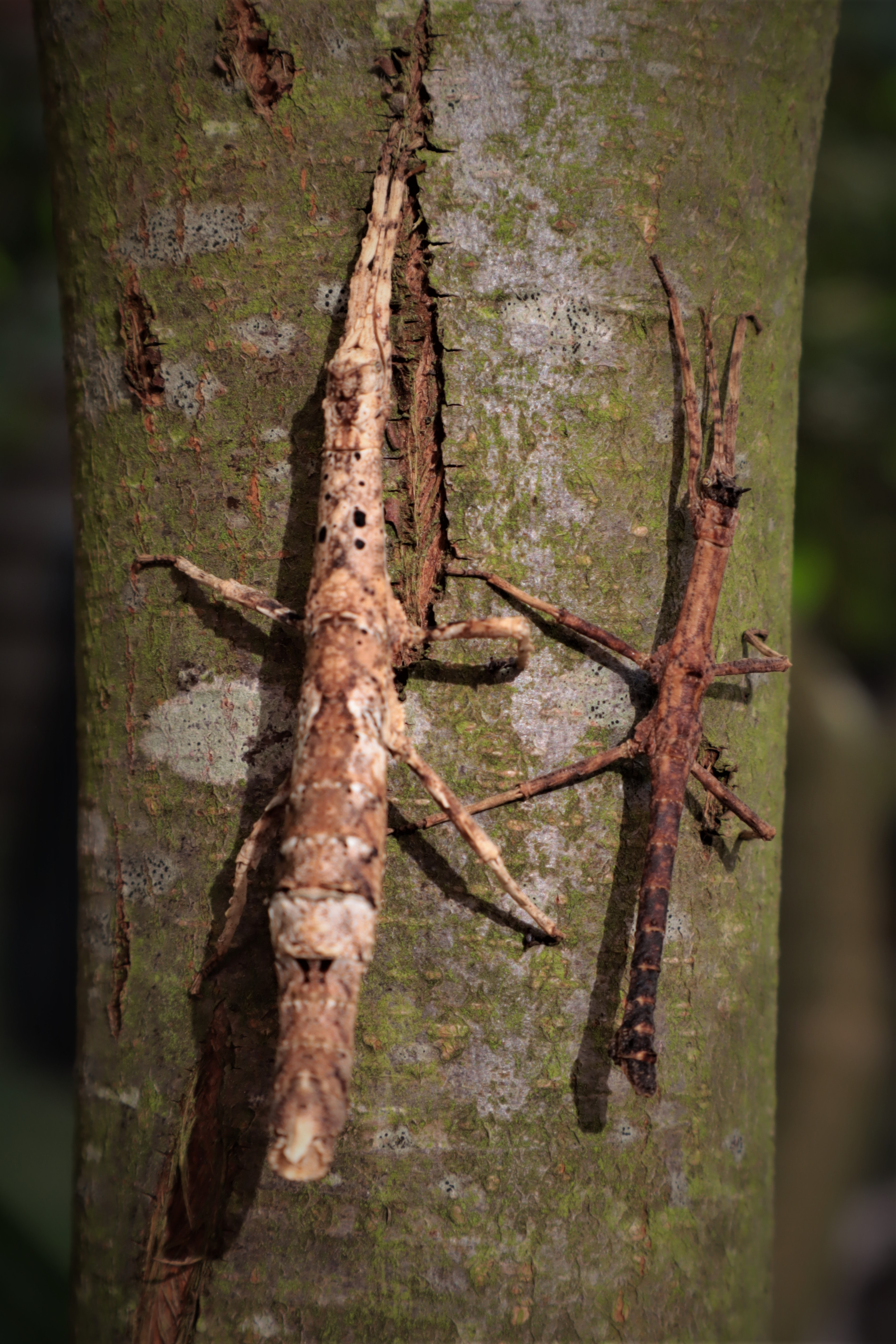
Pair of a not finally determined species, called Orestes cf. konchurangensis 'Kong Plong'
