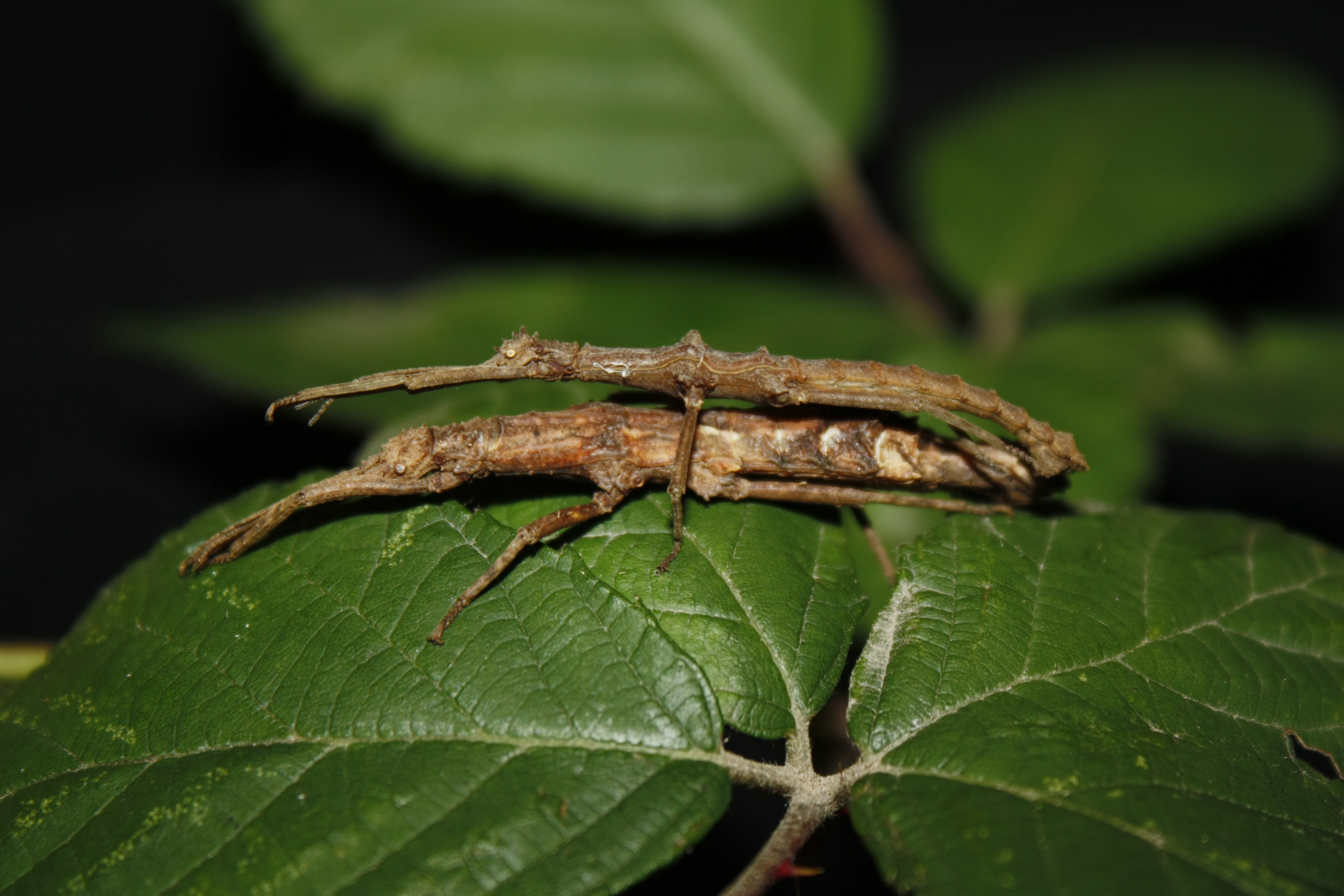
- Orestes krijnsi, pair from Núi Chúa National Park

Scientific classification
- Domain: Eukaryota
- Kingdom: Animalia
- Phylum: Arthropoda
- Class: Insecta
- Order: Phasmatodea
- Superfamily: Bacilloidea
- Family: Heteropterygidae
- Subfamily: Dataminae
- Genus: Orestes
- Species: O. krijnsi

Binomial name
- Orestes krijnsi Bresseel & Constant, 2018

= Orestes krijnsi =

Species of stick insect

Orestes krijnsi is a species of stick insects native to Vietnam.

== Characteristics ==
The females are 42.6 to 44.7 millimetres (1.68 to 1.76 in) long. Like those of Orestes mouhotii and Orestes draegeri they have a flat head. This means that all structures, except the central coronal, which Datamini usually wear on their head, are present, but only as small tubercles (see also Acanthotaxy of Heteropterygidae). In contrast to the other flat-headed species, in Orestes krijnsi the mesothorax is not parallel sided, but widened backwards. In addition, on the meso- and metapleura there are clearly developed extensions over the coxae with easily recognizable, lateral spines. The absence of spines or teeth on the tibia of the hind legs is also typical of the species. The crest which is medial on the rear ninth tergite of the abdomen is clearly elongated and roof-shaped. In addition to the typical light beige and brown tones, fresh adult females show contrasting patterns of almost white, dark brown and black spots.

The males are 34 to 37 millimetres (1.3 to 1.5 in) long and, typical of the genus, medium to dark brown in color. Their most striking feature is the strongly raised rear edge of the mesonotum and the less strongly, but still clearly raised, edge of the metanotum. Viewed from the side, these elevations look like two humps on the thorax. The mesothorax widens backwards. There are distinct supra coxal spines on the metapleura. On the head the supra antennals in front are present as clear spines and are directed slightly outwards. They are followed by the spiny supra occipitals. The conical, prickly anterior coronals are located on the apex. The posterior and lateral coronals are recognizable as small conical tubercles, which together with the extended edge of a ridge (postocular carina) placed behind the eyes and form a crown at the tip of vertex.

== Distribution and way of life ==
The species is so far only known from the Ninh Thuận Province in the south of Vietnam where it can be found in the Núi Chúa National Park.

Like most species of stick insects, Orestes krijnsi is nocturnal. When touched, the insects drop to the ground, put their legs on the body and align the antennae lengthways to the body, making them resemble a short broken branch (phytomimesis). The eggs are laid individually and are 3.4 millimetres (0.13 in) long, 2.0 millimetres (0.079 in) wide and 2.5 millimetres (0.098 in) high. The egg capsule is oval, slightly compressed on the sides and brown. The lid (operculum) is narrow, convex and strongly tapered towards the dorsal side of the capsule. The ventral edge is slightly wider and rounded. Both capsule and operculum are covered with 0.3 millimetres (0.012 in) long hairs which terminate in a grappling hook-shaped structure with three hooks. The micropylar plate has three arms. With one front and two backward arms. The edges of the micropylar plate are barely visible. The micropyle is small, black, cup-shaped and protruding. The color and shape of the eggs of Orestes krijnsi differ from those of all other known Orestes species.

== Taxonomy ==
Joachim Bresseel and Jérôme Constant found several specimens of this species in the Nui Chua National Park during nocturnal gatherings between July 3 and 9, 2014. In their work on the genus Orestes published in 2018, they described this species as well as five others. The species name is dedicated to Rob Krijns, a Dutch stick insect breeder who also kept and bred other species and stocks, brought by Bresseel and Constant from Southeast Asia. One of the collected males was deposited as holotype in the Museum of Natural Sciences in Brussels. Another three males and four females, as well as eggs, are stored as paratypes. They are either specimens from the place where they were found or specimens bred by Krijns or Daniel Dittmar. An adult pair of the paratypes is in the Vietnamese National Museum for Nature in Hanoi, the remaining paratypes in Brussels.

As genetic analysis, published in 2021 by Sarah Bank et al show, Orestes krijnsi is the sister species to all other Orestes species investigated which thus form a clade next to Orestes krijnsi within the genus.

== Terraristic ==
A sexually reproducing stock of the species can be found in the European terrariums. It goes back to specimens introduced by Bresseel and Constant in 2014 from the Nui Chua National Park in Vietnam. These were successfully kept and bred by Krijns like many other brought with them by Bresseel and Constant and distributed to other interested parties by the Dutch - Belgian working group Phasma. Until its genus reassignment and species description in 2018, the stock was named Pylaemenes sp. 'Nui Chua'. It is managed by the Phasmid Study Group under PSG number 405.

The keeping and breeding of Orestes krijnsi is somewhat more problematic than that of most of the other Orestes species. Too high humidity should be avoided. Leaves of hazel, bramble and other Rosaceae are eaten.

== Gallery ==
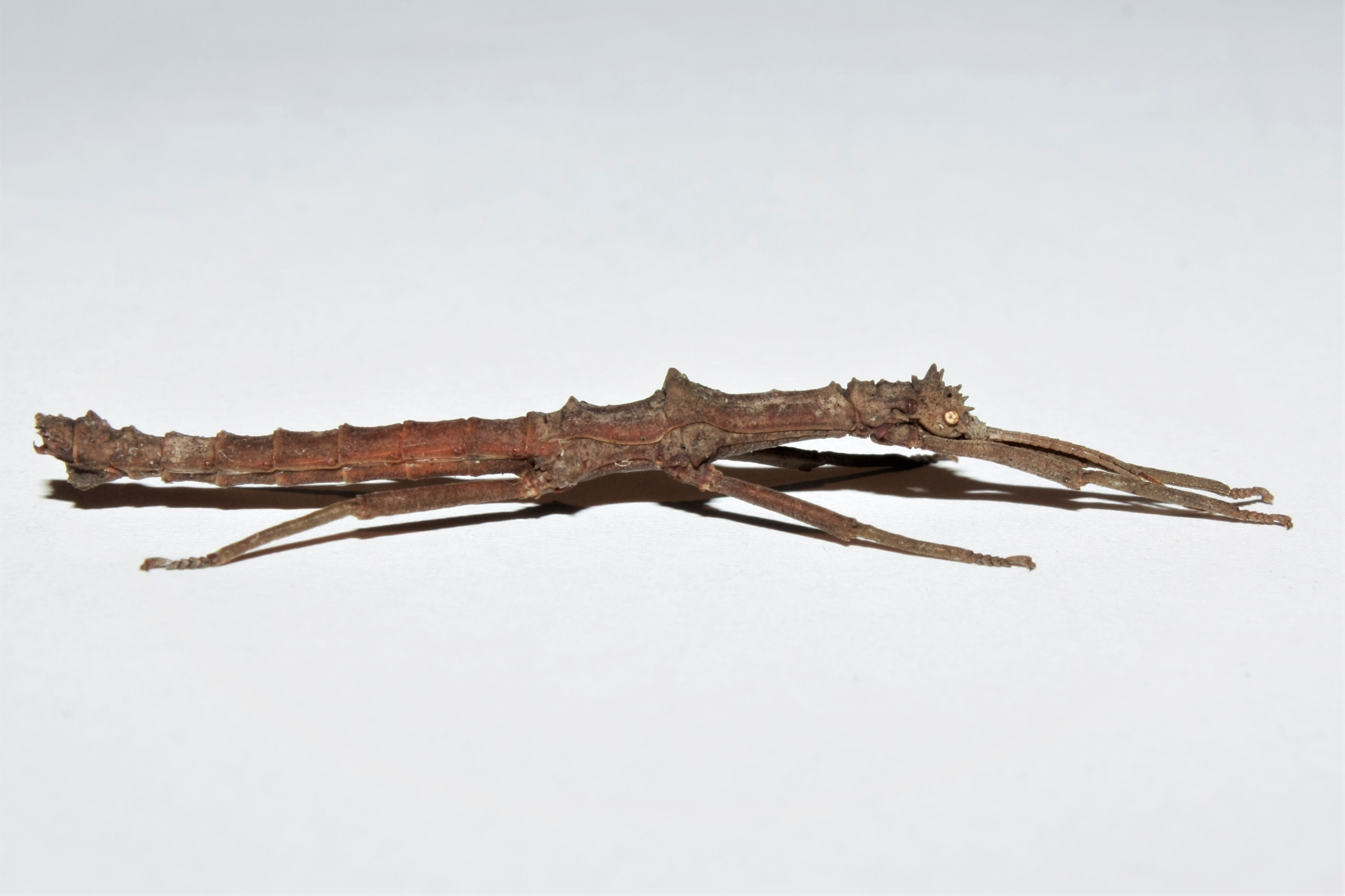
Male of stock from Nui Chua – laterally

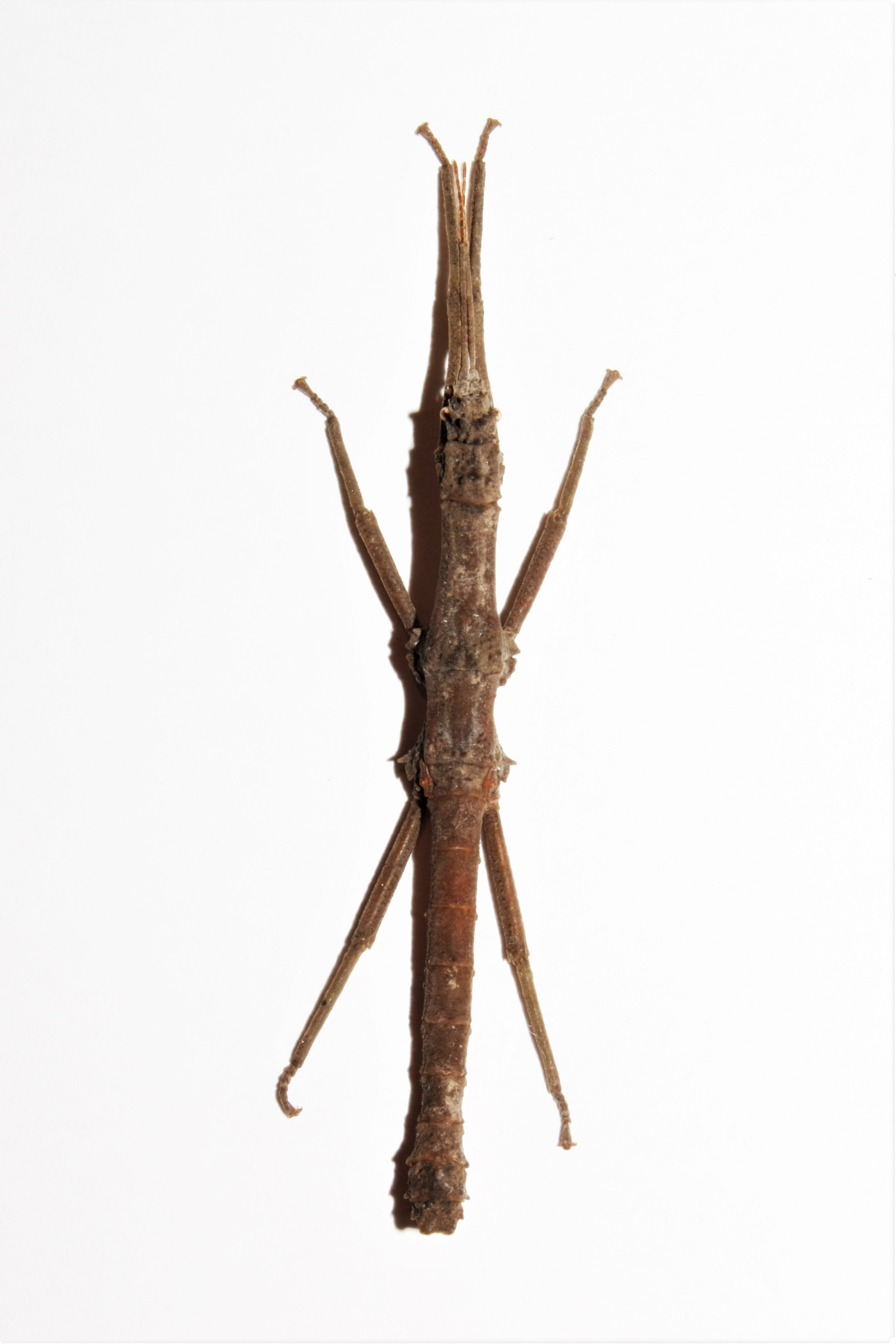
Male of stock from Nui Chua – dorsally

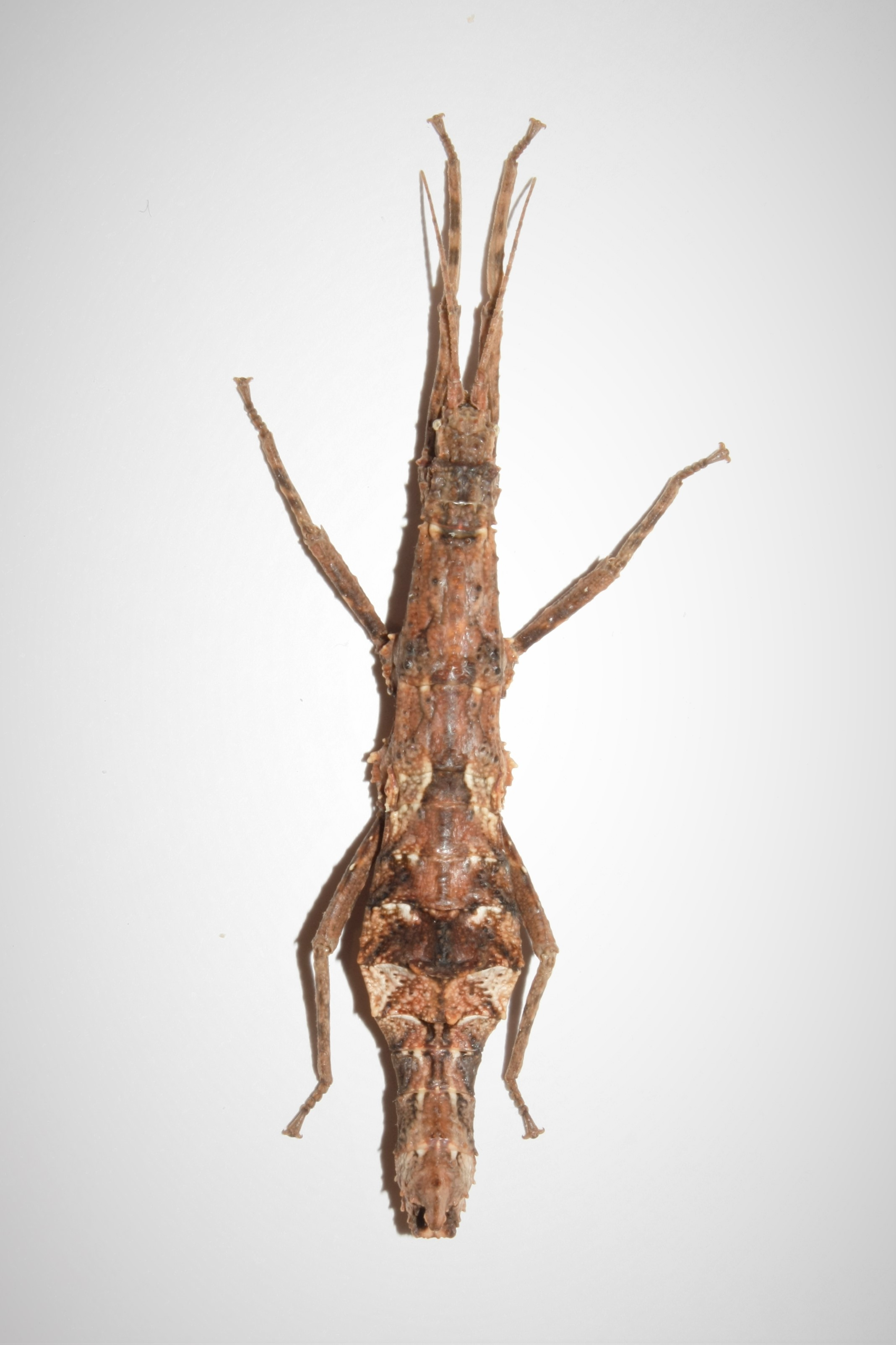
Female of stock from Nui Chua – dorsally

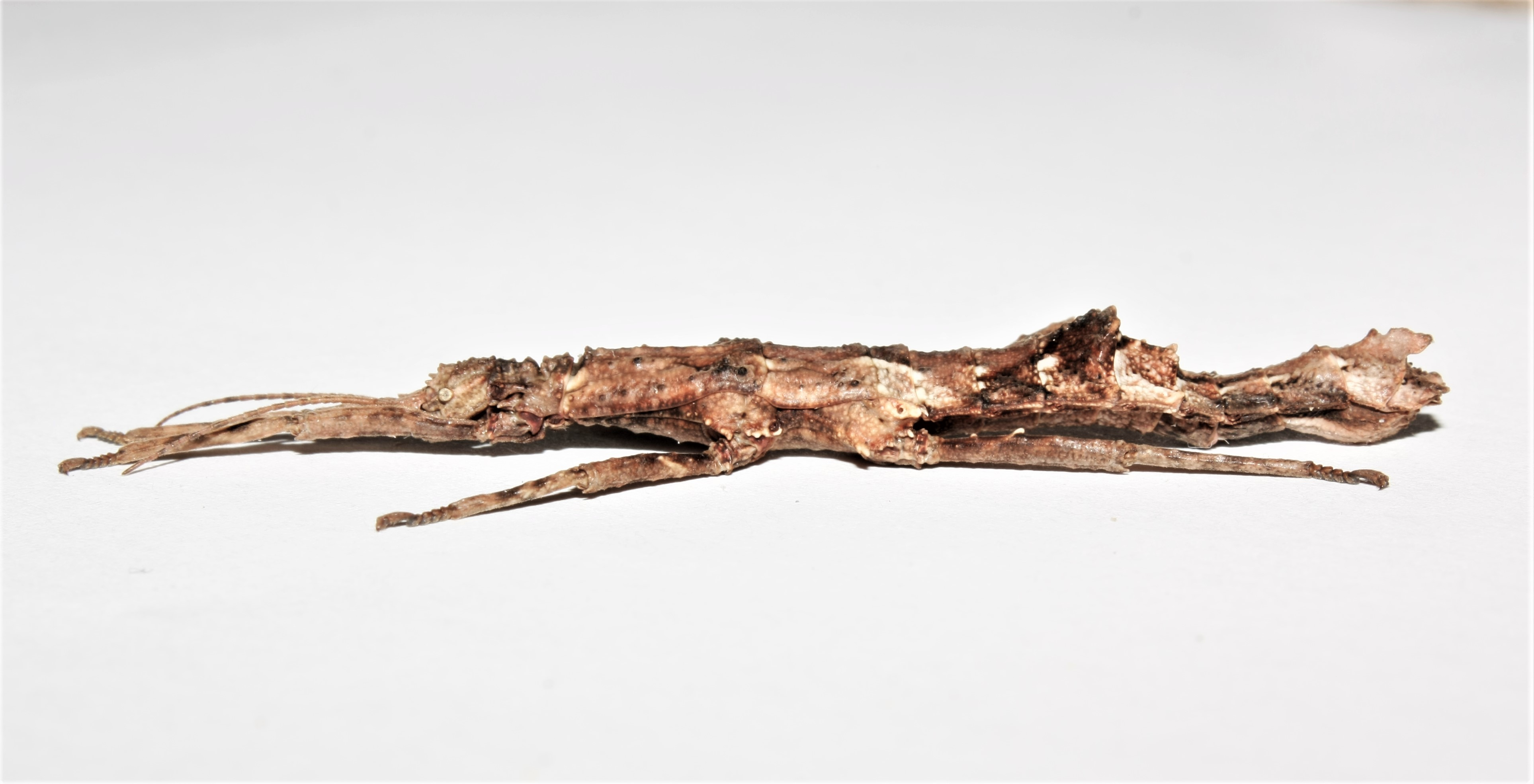
Female of stock from Nui Chua – laterally
