= Orestes ziegleri =

Scientific classification
- Domain: Eukaryota
- Kingdom: Animalia
- Phylum: Arthropoda
- Class: Insecta
- Order: Phasmatodea
- Superfamily: Bacilloidea
- Family: Heteropterygidae
- Subfamily: Dataminae
- Genus: Orestes
- Species: O. ziegleri

Binomial name
- Orestes ziegleri (Zompro & Fritzsche, 1999)

Synonyms
- Dares ziegleri Zompro & Fritzsche, 1999

Species of stick insect

Orestes ziegleri is a species of stick insect native to Thailand.

== Characteristics ==
The only female known to date is 45.7 millimetres (1.80 in) long, with 6.3 millimetres (0.25 in) on the head, 3.3 millimetres (0.13 in) on the pronotum, 8.3 millimetres (0.33 in) on the mesonotum and 1.9 millimetres (0.075 in) fall into the median segment. The coloration is given as chocolate brown, whereas the photo of the living animal attached to the first description shows a very light, rather beige coloration, which corresponds to the darkening of adult females of other Orestes species. On the head there are two rows tubercles converging from the vertex towards the occiput. They each consist of three large tubercles, which correspond to the supraantennals, the anterior and posterior supraoccipitals. Domed part of the occiput also with two rows of three smaller tubercles each, converging backwards. The bulge itself has laterally flat tubercles. The cheeks (genae) behind with an approximately tooth-shaped, large tubercle. The eyes are hemispherically protruding. The first five tergite of the abdomen are equal in length and widen posteriorly. Tergites seven to nine are parallel-sided, the tenth rectangular. Males of Orestes ziegleri are not known.

The dark brown eggs are 3.3 millimetres (0.13 in) long, 2.7 millimetres (0.11 in) wide and 2.9 millimetres (0.11 in) high. They are covered with 0.22 millimetres (0.0087 in) long hairs and the shape of the operculum and micropylar plate correspond to that of many other Orestes species.

== Distribution area and occurrence ==
The female of this species on which the first description is based was collected by Ingo Fritzsche between October 19 and 25, 1997 in the south of Khao Mai Pok in the Thai Nakhon Ratchasima province collected at an altitude between 900 and 1,000 metres (3,000 and 3,300 ft).

== Taxonomy ==
In 1999 Oliver Zompro and Fritzsche described the species under the basionym Dares ziegleri. The species name was chosen in honor of German hobby entomologist Ulrich Ziegler, who died in 1994 and whom both authors thank for his support in the early years. The female collected by Fritzsche is deposited as a holotype in Zompro's collection, as are the nine eggs laid by it. The affiliation of the species to Dares was already discussed in the first description. Establishing a separate genus without knowledge of the males was discarded.

Already in 2004 Zompro withdrew the name and synonymised the species with Datames guangxiensis, which has been referred to as Pylaemenes guangxiensis since the synonymisation of the genus Datames with Pylaemenes in 1998 (valid name today: Orestes guangxiensis). In the same work he placed it in the genus Dares. In 2006, Paul D. Brock and Masaya Okada canceld both, the synonymization of Dares ziegleri and the assignment of Pylaemenes guangxiensis to Dares, so that Dares ziegleri was again listed as a valid species. After a clearer differentiation between the genera Orestes and Pylaemenes had been specified in 2018, the species became 2021 due to the characteristics listed in the first description transferred to the genus Orestes by Joachim Bresseel and Kawin Jiaranaisakul. They further pointed out that both the publication by Zompro (2004) and that by Brock and Okada (2006) contained identification keys in which a mesonotum is typical for Pylaemenes, which is more than twice as long as the pronotum, which is the case with Orestes ziegleri according to the first description. Thus, an assignment to Pylaemenes and not to Dares would have been correct at the time.
