= Orestes diabolicus =

Scientific classification
- Domain: Eukaryota
- Kingdom: Animalia
- Phylum: Arthropoda
- Class: Insecta
- Order: Phasmatodea
- Superfamily: Bacilloidea
- Family: Heteropterygidae
- Subfamily: Dataminae
- Genus: Orestes
- Species: O. diabolicus

Binomial name
- Orestes diabolicus Bresseel & Constant, 2018

Species of stick insect

Orestes diabolicus is a species of stick insects native in Vietnam. The species is so far only known from a three males.

== Characteristics ==
The species is only known from males, which are unusually prickly for the genus Orestes. These are 40.1 to 41.8 millimetres (1.58 to 1.65 in) and have a solid red-brown color. In addition to the long spines, the relatively long legs are also noticeable, through which Orestes diabolicus can be easily distinguished from the closely related Orestes botot. When compared superficially, the males resemble those of the genus Epidares rather than those of Orestes. The pronotum has a pair of short, but clearly developed spines on the rear edge. According to the acanthotaxy by Philip Edward Bragg in 1998 and 2001, these are the posterior pronatals. In front of it there are four tubercles. On the mesonotum is a pair of long, pointed anterior mesonotals and after about a third a pair of even longer posterior mesonotals at the rear edge. The supra coxals in between on the pleura of the metathorax are barely as long as the anterior mesonotals. The longest and most noticeable spines are the supra coxals on the metapleura. They are aligned horizontally and at right angles to the body. On top of the metanotum is a pair of posterior metanotals that are slightly backward and are similar in length to the posterior mesonotals. On the head the supra antennals are clear, conical, but blunt and slightly directed outwards. The supra occipitals are about the same size as supra antennals. They are blunt and directed backwards. The vertex is elongated and raised. The supra orbitals are the most noticeable structures of the head and look like pointed horns. Except for Orestes diabolicus they are similarly prominent only to be found in the males of Orestes botot. They are located at the base of the ridge, are significantly elongated and protrude beyond the sides of the pronotum. The anterior coronals are elongated and prickly. They are located near the top of the ridge. The central coronal is small but recognizable. The posterior and lateral coronals are only present as small granules. Behind the eye, a distinct edge (postocular carina) reaches the rear edge of the ridge. The antennae are shorter than the fore legs and consist of 23 segments. The first segment of the antennae (Scapus) is strongly flattened and has a conspicuous thorn pointing obliquely forwards.

== Distribution area ==
The species has so far only been documented from the Lâm Đồng Province in Vietnam, where it was found in the Bidoup Núi Bà National Park.

== Taxonomy ==
Joachim Bresseel and Jérôme Constant found three males of this species in the Bidoup-Nui Ba National Park on the nights of July 21 to 25, 2014. In their work on the genus Orestes, published in 2018, they described five other newly discovered species as well. The specific epithet "diabolicus" for lat. "devilish" refers to the characteristic and long spines of the species, which are extraordinarily pronounced for the genus. A male was deposited as holotype, another as paratype in the Museum of Natural Sciences in Brussels. The third male is also deposited as paratype in the Vietnamese National Museum for Nature in Hanoi.
