= Orestes botot =

Scientific classification
- Kingdom: Animalia
- Phylum: Arthropoda
- Class: Insecta
- Order: Phasmatodea
- Superfamily: Bacilloidea
- Family: Heteropterygidae
- Subfamily: Dataminae
- Genus: Orestes
- Species: O. botot

Binomial name
- Orestes botot Bresseel & Constant, 2018

Species of stick insect

Orestes botot is a species of stick insects native to Vietnam.

== Characteristics ==
The species is characterized by various long spines on the head of the males and distinct spines over the hind legs on the pleura of the metathorax, which are long and pointed in the males and broad in the females and are pointed. Within the genus, only the males of Orestes diabolicus have more and longer spines. Males of Orestes botot reach a length of 44 to 45 millimetres (1.7 to 1.8 in) and are dark brown in color. The longitudinal edges of the meso- and metanotum are yellowish. On the pronotum there are two to four tubercles. The mesonotum has a pair of short, but clearly developed spines on the rear edge, which are the posterior mesonotals according the acanthotaxy of Philip Edward Bragg in 1998 respectively 2001. The pleura of the metathorax are extended over the coxae. The longest and most noticeable spines are the supra coxals on the metapleura. They are oriented horizontally and pointed slightly backwards. The supra antennals are clearly visible on the head, conical, but blunt and slightly directed outwards. The posterior supra occipitals are small, blunt, and directed upwards. The vertex is elongated and raised. The supra orbitals are the most noticeable structures of the head and look like pointed horns. Except for Orestes botot they can only be found prominently in the males of Orestes diabolicus. They are located at the base of the ridge, are significantly elongated, slightly curved and have a pointed end. The anterior coronals are spinous and sit at the top of the ridge. The posterior and lateral coronals are only present as small granules. Behind each eye, a distinct edge (postocular carina) reaches the rear edge of the ridge. The 23-segment antennae are shorter than the fore legs. The first antenna segment (scapus) is strongly flattened with a lateral edge and a posterolateral spine.

The females grow to be 49.8 to 50.4 millimetres (1.96 to 1.98 in) long. The supra antennals are clearly present on the head, laterally slightly flattened, blunt and slightly pointing outwards. At their base they merge with the anterior supra occipitals, which are small, blunt and pointing upwards. The posterior supra occipitals are formed as small granules. The vertex is elongated and sharply raised with the supra orbitals. The anterior coronals are also strongly compressed on the sides. Its front edge reaches the top of the supra orbitals. The vertex, supra orbitals and anterior coronals form conspicuous, laterally strongly compressed lamellae on both sides of the head, which are connected by the raised central coronal. The posterior and lateral coronals are only present as tubercles. Between the lateral and anterior coronals are a series of four tubercles on the sides of a ridge. Behind the each eye, a distinct edge reaches the rear edge of this ridge. The antennae consist of 25 segments and are shorter than the fore legs. Pro- and mesonotum are slightly trapezoidal and widened backwards. Most noticeable are the metapleurs, which are clearly widened above the coxae. They have a few small spines in front. A large, posterolaterally notched supra coxal spine is located behind it.

== Distribution area ==
The species has so far only been documented from the Lâm Đồng Province in Vietnam, where it was found together with Orestes diabolicus in the Bidoup Núi Bà National Park.

== Taxonomy ==
Joachim Bresseel and Jérôme Constant found four males, one female and also one male and one female nymph of this species in the nights from July 21 to 25, 2014 in the Bidoup-Nui Ba National Park. In their work on the genus Orestes, published in 2018, they described five other, newly discovered species as well. The specific epithet "botot" is derived from "bò tót", the Vietnamese name for the gaur, who is also native in this national park. It refers to the two horns formed by the supra orbitals on the head of the species. One male was deposited as holotype, two other males, one female and the two nymphs were deposited as paratypes in the Museum of Natural Sciences deposited in Brussels. The fourth male and one offspring female are stored as paratypes in the Vietnamese National Museum for Nature in Hanoi.

== Terraristic ==
Orestes botot was briefly kept in terrarium in 2014. The Dutch stick insect breeder Rob Krijns was able to raise and breed the species successfully. However, the breeding expired before the species could be passed on to other enthusiasts.
