= Bạch Mã National Park =

National park in Vietnam

Bach Ma National Park
- IUCN category II (national park)
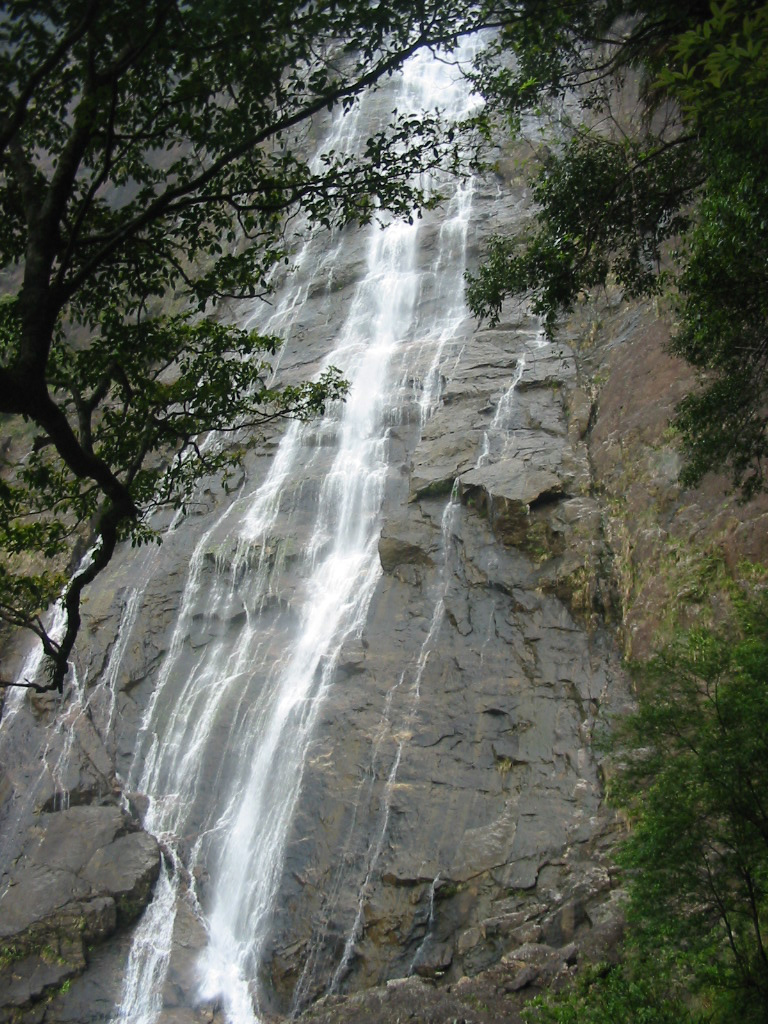

- Location within Vietnam
- Location: Central Vietnam
- Nearest city: Huế
- Coordinates: 16°12′0″N 107°52′0″E
- Area: 220 km^{2} (85 sq mi)
- Established: 1986

Bạch Mã National Park (Vietnamese: Vườn quốc gia Bạch Mã) is a protected area in central Vietnam, near the cities of Huế and Danang. It covers 220 km^{2} and comprises three zones: a strictly protected core area, an administrative area and a buffer zone. The park can be accessed by foot, moped or with a park guide's car.

== History ==
In 1932, the summit of Bạch Mã was selected by the French engineer Girard to become a hill station for the colonial administration of Hue. In the following years, a village including 139 villas and hotels was created. To accommodate holidaymakers and to avoid commuting on the steep, 19-kilometre-long (12 mi) road to the next major town, there was a post office, a market, and a hospital. By 1937 the number of holiday homes had reached 139 and it became known as the "Dalat of central Vietnam". Most of the visitors were high-ranking French VIPs. The area saw fighting in the early 1950s. After independence from the French, the villas at Bạch Mã were abandoned; today they are in total ruin and only a few stone walls remain. At an elevation of 1250 meters above sea level, the national park is a popular summer retreat in Vietnam due to its cooler climate.

The area around Bach Ma was first protected as a series of forest reserves in 1937 and was declared a protected area by the government of South Vietnam in 1962. In 1986 the area was established as a national park. The forests of the park, like Cát Tiên National Park, suffered from the use of defoliants like Agent Orange during the Vietnam War.

In 2004, the park was being considered for expansion in order to create a corridor from the border with Laos to the sea.

== Environment ==
Bạch Mã National Park is situated in the Annamite Mountains and is one of the wettest places in Vietnam. Its mountains are composed mainly of granite, and the topography of the park is generally very steep. Its position, at the biogeographical border between northern and southern Vietnam, combined with its variety of habitats, ranging from the coast to high mountains, means the park is rich in biodiversity.

=== Flora ===
The park is located in an area that is considered a centre of plant diversity in Vietnam. The main vegetation type is moist evergreen and montane forest, as well as areas of scrub and grassland where human disturbance has been high.

=== Fauna ===
The mammals of the park are not well known, though historically it held important species such as the Asian elephant, white-cheeked gibbon and red-shanked douc langur. It also protects important bird species, especially Vietnamese endemics such as the Vietnamese crested argus, Annam partridge and Edwards's pheasant, which had been thought extinct. The park has been designated an Important Bird Area (IBA) by BirdLife International because it supports significant populations of many bird species.
