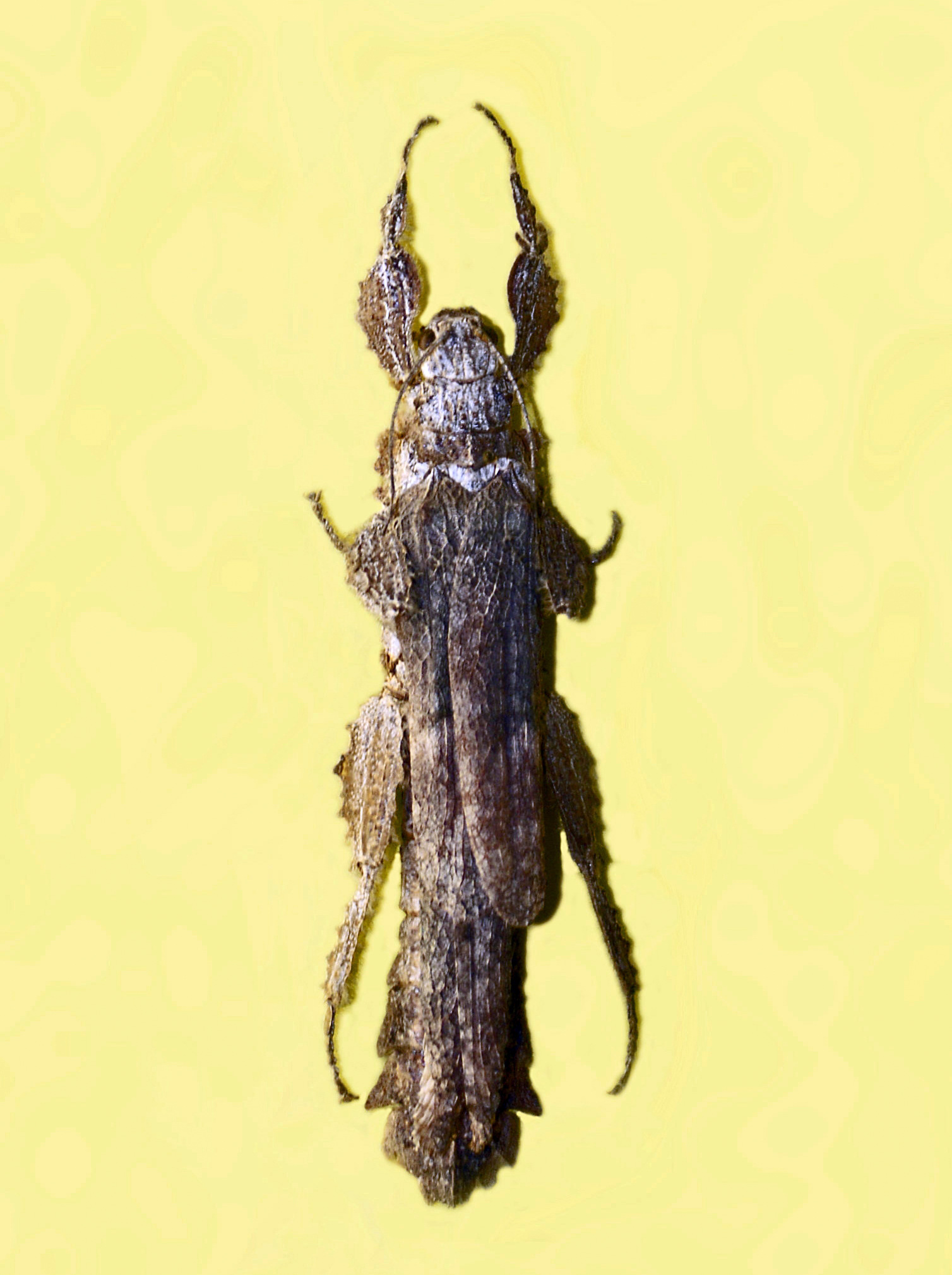
- Prisopus species. Museum specimen

Scientific classification
- Domain: Eukaryota
- Kingdom: Animalia
- Phylum: Arthropoda
- Class: Insecta
- Order: Phasmatodea
- Superfamily: Aschiphasmatoidea
- Family: Prisopodidae
- Genus: Prisopus; Peletier de Saint Fargeau & Serville, 1827

Type species
- Prisopus sacratus (Olivier, 1792)

= Prisopus =

Genus of insects

Prisopus is a genus of stick insects belonging to the family Prisopodidae. These stick insects are present in Central and South America, India and Malesia.

== Species ==
Species within this genus include:

- Prisopus amapa Piza, 1979
- Prisopus apteros Camousseight, 2010
- Prisopus ariadne Hebard, 1923
- Prisopus atrobrunneus (Heleodoro & Rafael, 2020)
- Prisopus berosus Westwood, 1859
- Prisopus bifidus Conle, Hennemann & Gutiérrez, 2011
- Prisopus biolleyi Carl, 1913
- Prisopus brunnescens (Heleodoro & Rafael, 2020)
- Prisopus caatingaensis (Heleodoro & Rafael, 2020)
- Prisopus cepus Westwood, 1859
- Prisopus clarus Conle, Hennemann, Bellanger, Lelong, Jourdan & Valero, 2020
- Prisopus conocephalus Conle, Hennemann, Bellanger, Lelong, Jourdan & Valero, 2020
- Prisopus draco (Olivier, 1792)
- Prisopus horridus (Gray, 1835)
- Prisopus horstokkii (Haan, 1842)
- Prisopus minimus Chopard, 1911
- Prisopus nanus Conle, Hennemann & Gutiérrez, 2011
- Prisopus occipitalis Dohrn, 1910
- Prisopus ohrtmanni (Lichtenstein, 1802)
- Prisopus phacellus Westwood, 1859
- Prisopus piperinus Redtenbacher, 1906
- Prisopus sacratus (Olivier, 1792)
- Prisopus villosipes (Redtenbacher, 1906)
- Prisopus wolfgangjunki Zompro, 2003
