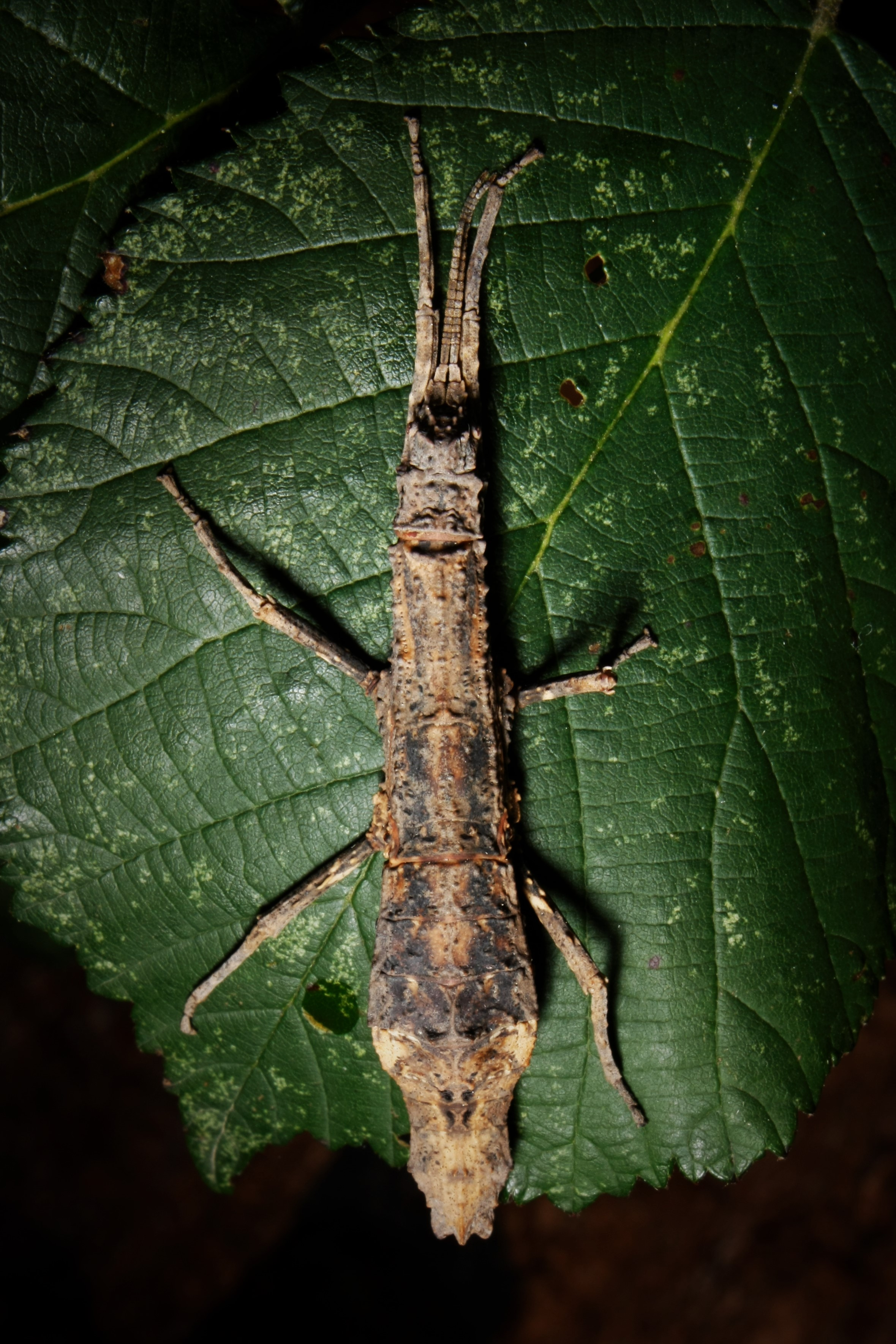
- Pylaemenes elenamikhailorum, female

Scientific classification
- Domain: Eukaryota
- Kingdom: Animalia
- Phylum: Arthropoda
- Class: Insecta
- Order: Phasmatodea
- Superfamily: Bacilloidea
- Family: Heteropterygidae
- Subfamily: Dataminae
- Genus: Pylaemenes
- Species: P. elenamikhailorum

Binomial name
- Pylaemenes elenamikhailorum Seow-Choen, 2016

= Pylaemenes elenamikhailorum =

Species of stick insect

Pylaemenes elenamikhailorum is a species of stick insects native in Sepilok on Borneo. In application of the more recent differentiation between the genera Pylaemenes and Orestes the species is sometimes also called Orestes elenamikhailorum.

== Characteristics ==
The males are about 39 to 42 millimetres (1.5 to 1.7 in) long and, typical of the genus, are medium to dark brown in color. On the head there are mostly pairs of more or less distinct structures that are species-specific (see also Acanthotaxy of Heteropterygidae). In males of Pylaemenes elenamikhailorum the supra-antennals are present as clear spines and are slightly directed outwards. The supra occipitals behind it are somewhat smaller. Various tubercles and spines form a crown on the occiput. The lateral pre occipitals are spiky and directed outwards. The anterior occipitals are broad at the base and point upwards backwards. Behind it there is only a small central occipital. The posterior occipitals are formed as a smaller pair of spines on the side of the central occipital. The pronotum is deeply grooved transversely in the middle and has a pair of tubercles behind. The mesonotum has noticeable edges along the middle and sides. Its rear edge is slightly raised and has two small tubercles. The metanotum also has lateral edges, but no tubercles.

The females are 46 to 55 millimetres (1.8 to 2.2 in) long. The structures on the head are similar to those of the males, but are not designed as spines, but rather as tubercles. In addition to the typical light to dark brown basic color, especially fresh adult females show contrasting patterns of light and darker spots. At the rear edge of the mesonotum there is a pair of small tubercles.

== Taxonomy ==
Francis Seow-Choen described the species in 2016 as Pylaemenes elenamikhailorum based on offspring. These were bred by Elena Tkacheva and Mikhail Berezin, two Russian entomologists from the insectarium of the Moscow Zoo who collected this species in Sepilok in 2013 and had successfully bred. The species name is dedicated to both and a combination of their first names. Seow-Choen received a pair of the species from them during a visit in 2015. As holotype is a male, as paratype is a female at the Lee Kong Chian Natural History Museum at the National University of Singapore deposited. Two other paratypes are in the private collection of Seow-Choen.

As part of the description of six new Orestes species from Vietnam, Joachim Bresseel and Jérôme Constant introduced a new delimitation between the genera Pylaemenes and Orestes in January 2018, which was confirmed by genetic analysis in 2021. According to this, Pylaemenes elenamikhailorum must be transferred to the genus Orestes. Seow-Choen continues to list the species in Pylaemenes in December 2019, although he includes the work of Bresseel and Constant in the list of references.

== Terraristic ==
Since Tkacheva and Berezin found the species in Sepilok in 2013, they have successfully kept and bred it in the Moscow Zoo and since 2015 distributed it as a breeding stock. In 2018 this came to Germany for the first time, where Daniel Dittmar initially parthenogenetically and since 2020 also sexually bred and distributed it. The species easily eats the leaves of bramble and other Rosaceae.

== Gallery ==
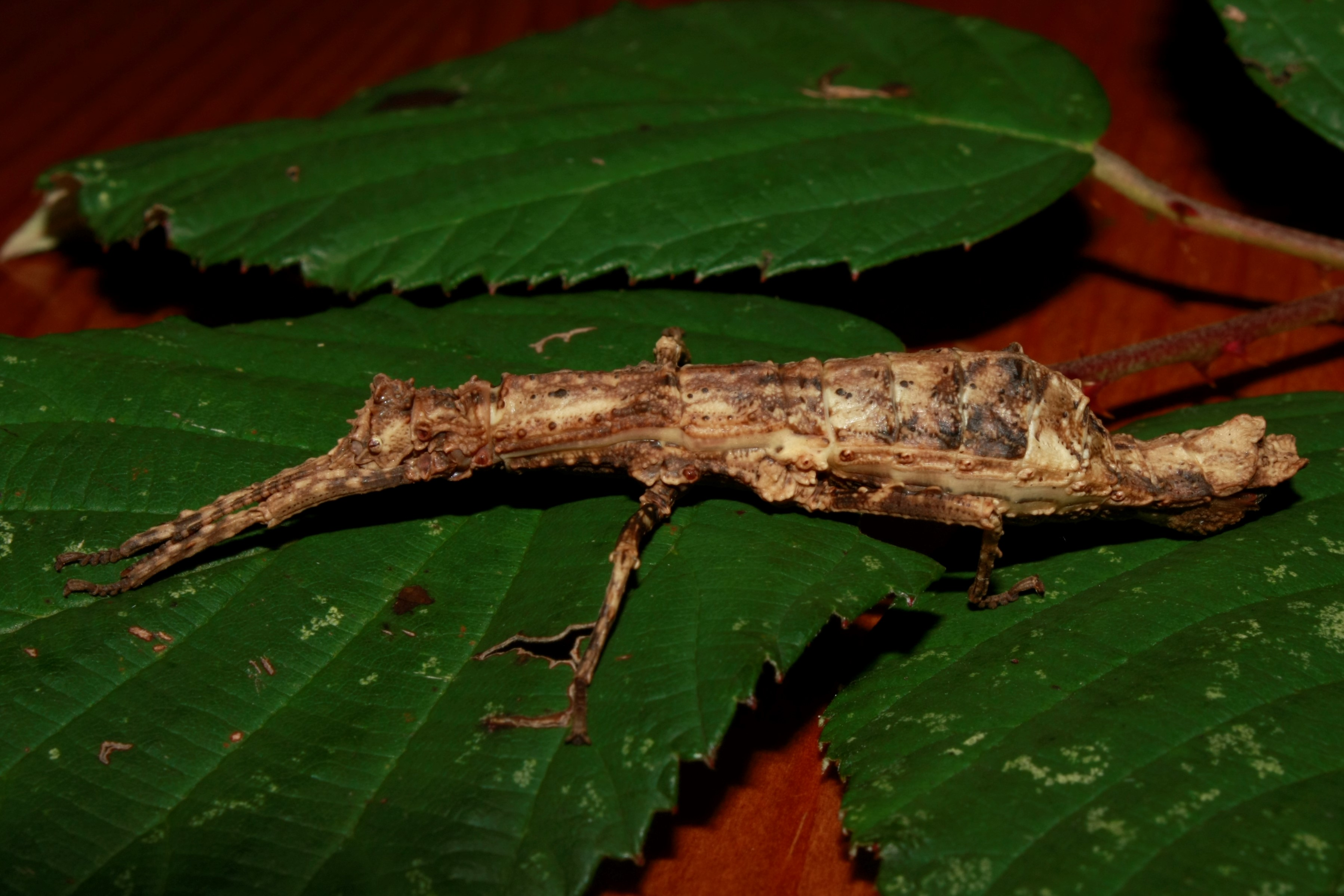
Adult female

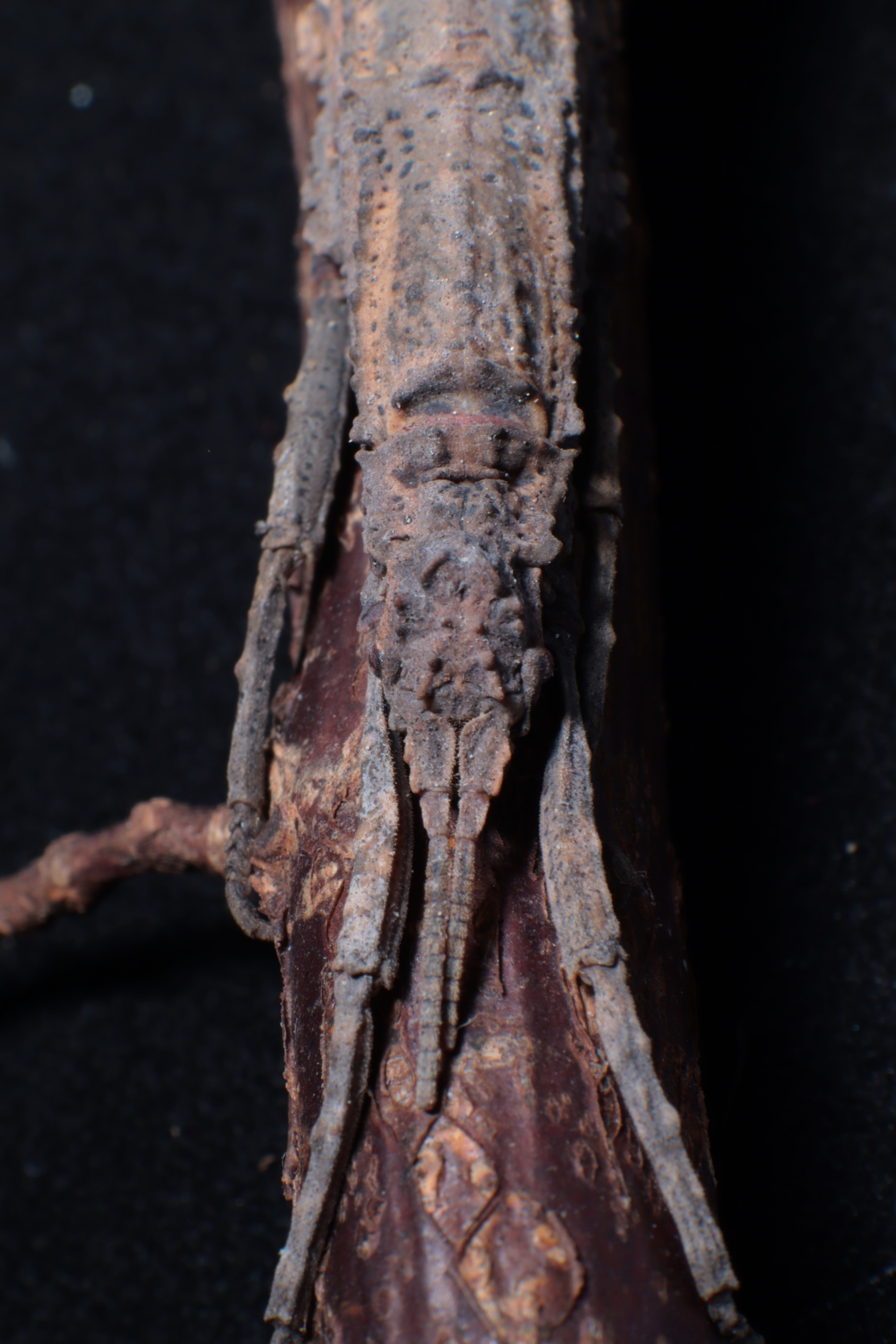
Portrait of a female

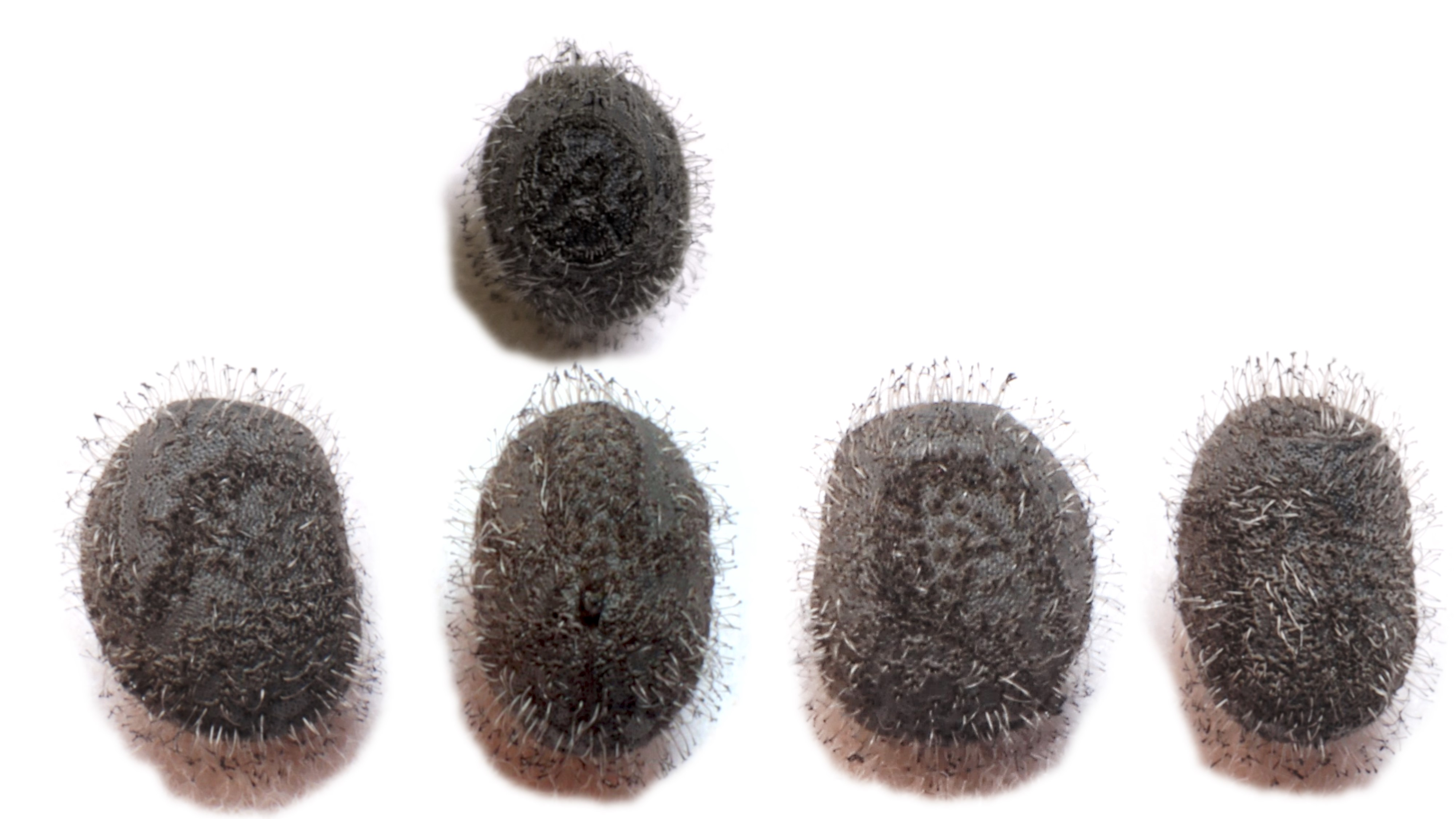
Eggs: above view from above (with lid), left to right: laterally, dorsally, laterally, ventrally
