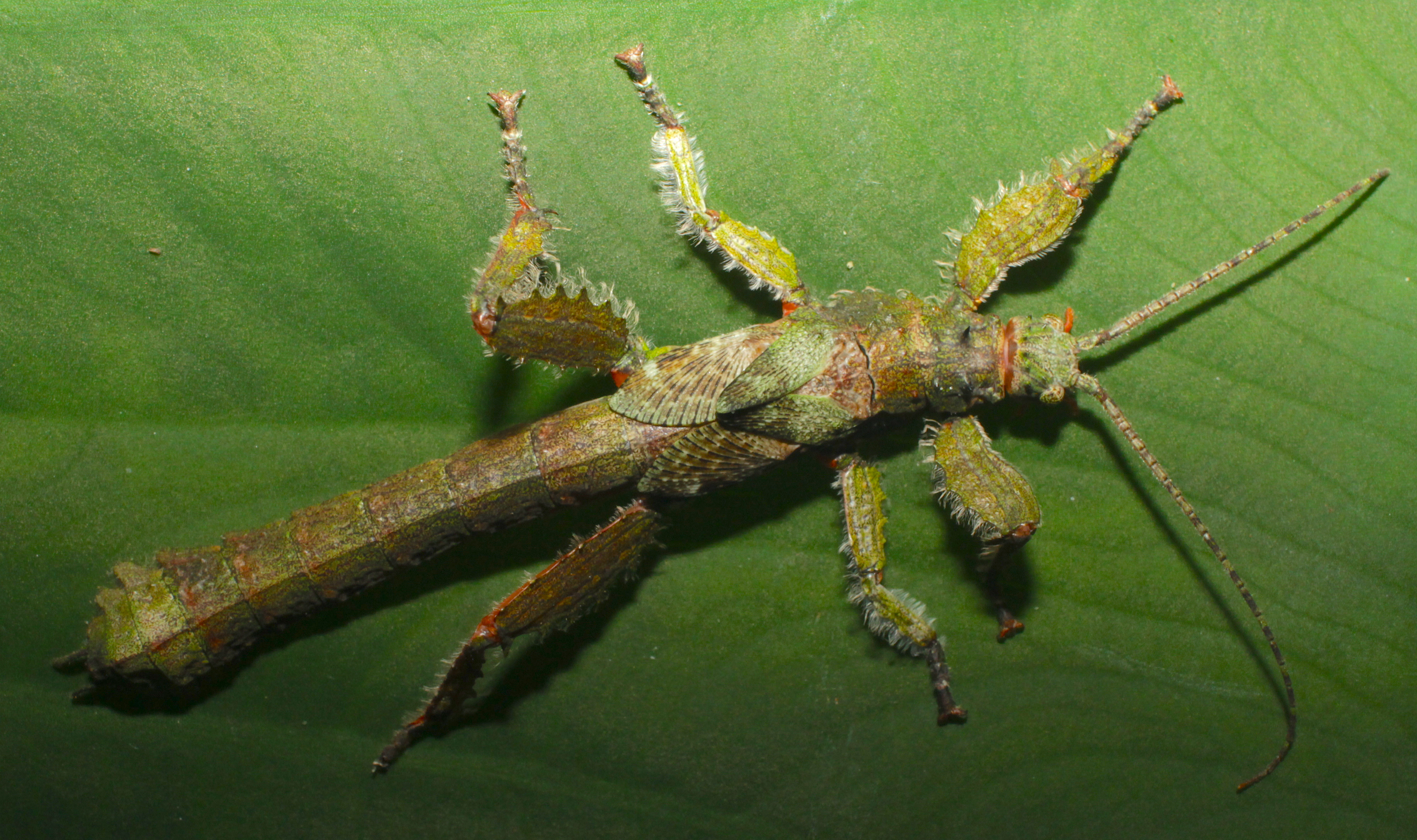
- Prisopus sacratus, in the state of São Paulo, Brazil

Scientific classification
- Kingdom: Animalia
- Phylum: Arthropoda
- Clade: Pancrustacea
- Class: Insecta
- Order: Phasmatodea
- Family: Prisopodidae
- Genus: Prisopus
- Species: P. sacratus

Binomial name
- Prisopus sacratus Olivier, 1792

Synonyms
- Mantis sacrata Olivier, 1792

= Prisopus sacratus =

Species of stick insect

Prisopus sacratus, sometimes called the dragon of Amboina or Brazilian tree lobster, of the genus Prisopus is a stick insect belonging to the family Prisopodidae. Prisopus sacratus is primarily found in the southern part of the Atlantic Forest (Portuguese: Mata Atlântica), in the Brazilian states of São Paulo, Paraná and Santa Catarina. One of approximately 14 recognized species of Prisopus, the insect is characterized by an elongated body, with spiny and hairy projections that enhance their mimicry of plant stems and branches. The genus was originally described by Amédée Louis Michel le Peletier, comte de Saint-Fargeau and Jean Guillaume Audinet-Serville in 1828, with the type species Prisopus sacratus (Olivier, 1792) from South America.

Species of the genus Prisopus are found from southern Mexico, extending through Central America to northern South America, encompassing nations such as Costa Rica, Panama, Ecuador, Peru, and Brazil. They inhabit tropical forests where their cryptic morphology serves as an effective defense mechanism against predators. These insects display sexual dimorphism, with females generally being larger and laying eggs that are adhered in clusters to vegetation, a behavior that is common throughout the genus. Taxonomic research has categorized the subfamily Prisopodinae into tribes, positioning Prisopus within the tribe Prisopodini based on the morphology of their tarsal attachment pads, which underscores their evolutionary adaptations for adhesion to plant surfaces.

== Etymology and history ==
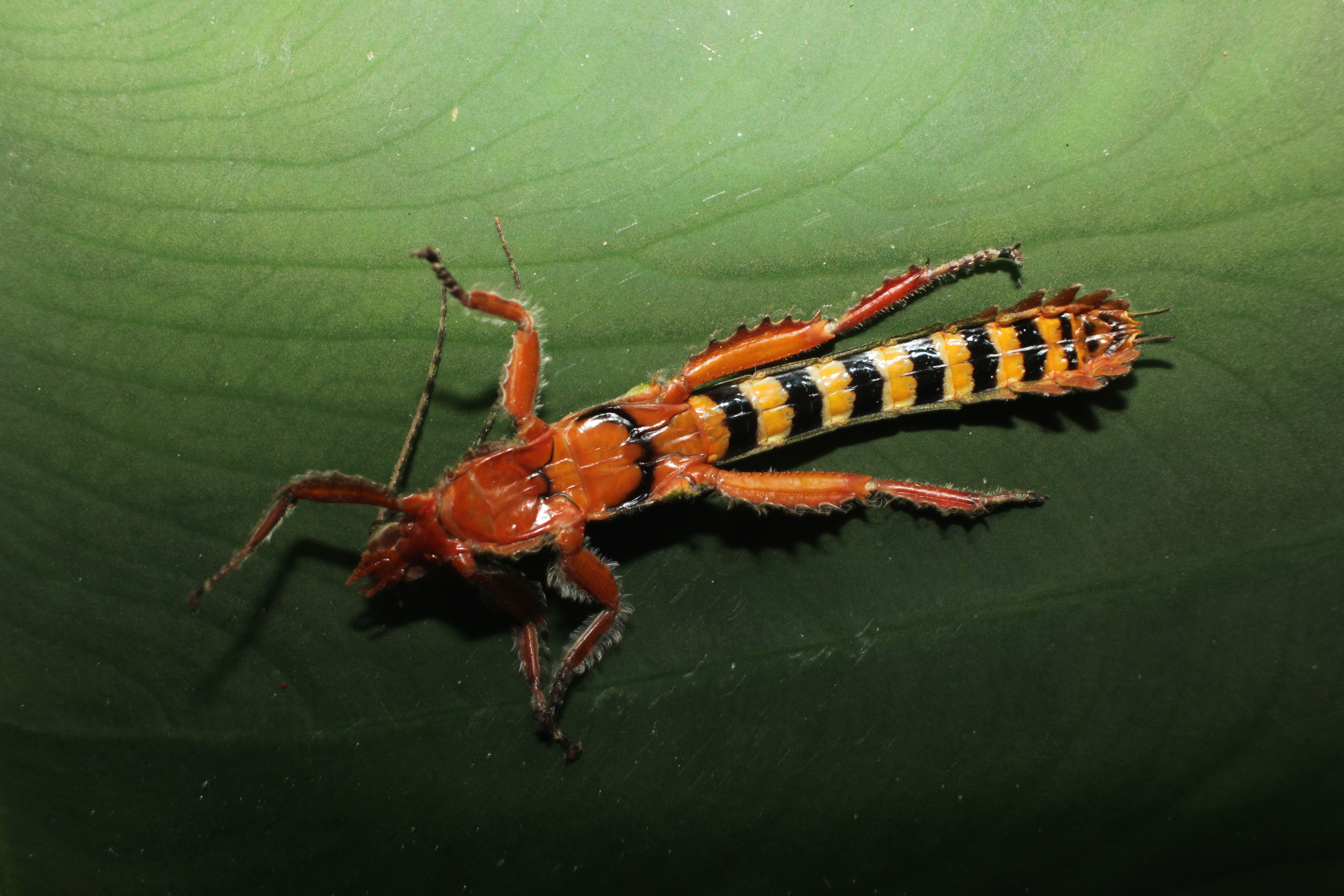
Underside of Prisopus sacratus

The genus name Prisopus derives from the Greek words priōn (saw) and pous (foot), alluding to the serrated or saw-like tarsi observed in certain species.
