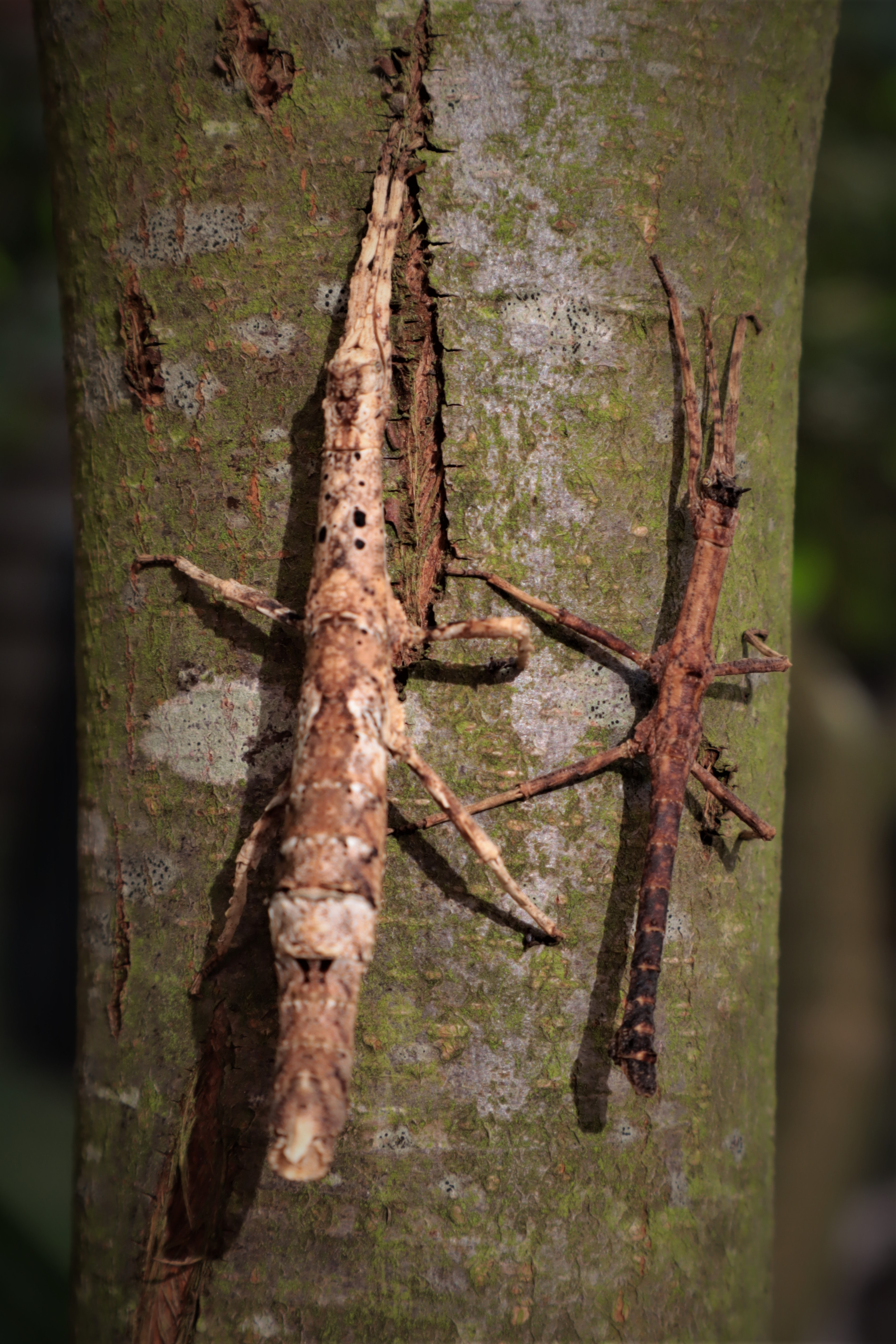
- Pair of a cultured stock called Orestes cf. konchurangensis 'Kong Plong'.jpg

Scientific classification
- Domain: Eukaryota
- Kingdom: Animalia
- Phylum: Arthropoda
- Class: Insecta
- Order: Phasmatodea
- Superfamily: Bacilloidea
- Family: Heteropterygidae
- Subfamily: Dataminae
- Genus: Pylaemenes
- Species: P. konchurangensis

Binomial name
- Pylaemenes konchurangensis Ho, 2018

= Pylaemenes konchurangensis =

Species of stick insect

Pylaemenes konchurangensis is a species of stick insects native in Vietnam. The species has been described in the genus Pylaemenes, but from its morphological characters it belongs in the genus Orestes.

== Characteristics ==
Pylaemenes konchurangensis is an elongated species that has very few structures on the body surface and whose females resemble Pylaemenes konkakinhensis which was described at the same time. Compared to this, the females are significantly longer with a body length of 51 to 57 millimetres (2.0 to 2.2 in). There is only one tubercle on the outer edge of the first antenna segment, while there are two in Pylaemenes konkakinhensis. Pylaemenes konchurangensis females have granular tubercles on the posterior, lateral aspect of the fourth tergite of the abdomen. Their subgenital plate is not pointed. The antenna are 13 to 15 millimetres (0.51 to 0.59 in) long and consist of 25 segments. The 4 millimetres (0.16 in) long head is oval and had two pairs of granular protuberances on the vertex, the anterior pair being slightly larger than the posterior. The occiput is raised to a posteriorly converging, V-shaped crest. Six small swellings can be seen on the back edge of the head. The 3 to 3.5 millimetres (0.12 to 0.14 in) pronotum is square. Its front edge is curved inwards. The 11 to 12 millimetres (0.43 to 0.47 in) long mesonotum is almost parallel-sided and slightly enlarged behind the postmedial area. It is longer than the combined length of the 4.5 to 5 millimetres (0.18 to 0.20 in) long square metanotum and the 1.5 millimetres (0.059 in) median segment. On the fourth to seventh tergites of the abdomen there are medial X-shaped structures. The second and third tergites are parallel-sided, the fourth widens posteriorly, while the fifth and sixth tergites narrows posteriorly. The seventh tergite has medial posterior a protuberance called preopercular organ. On the poserior ninth tergite is an elongated crest. The coloring of the females is dominated by light beige and brown tones and is more typical of females of the genus Orestes.

The almost uniformly brown colored males are about 41 millimetres (1.6 in) long and significantly smaller and slimmer than the females. The antennae are 42 millimetres (1.7 in) long and consist of 19 segments. The 3 millimetres (0.12 in) long head has similar but more distinct structures compared to the females. Most notable are the three short medial protuberances and the two anterior spines on the crest of the occiput. Pro-, meso- and metanotum are similar in size to females. The abdomen is slender, cylindrical and rare granulated.

== Taxonomy ==
George Ho Wai-Chun described the species in July 2018 as Pylaemenes konchurangensis based on two females and one male found by Alexei V. Abramov from Russia in September 2011 at an altitude of 1,020 metres (3,350 ft) in Kon Chu Rang Nature Reserve about 40 km north of K’ Bang Town in the Vietnamese Gia Lai province. One of the females was declared a holotype, the other and the male as paratypes. The females are deposited at the Manchester Museum and the male at the collection of Hong Kong Entomological Society. The species name refers to the place where the specimens were found.

As part of the description of six new Orestesspecies from Vietnam, Joachim Bresseel and Jérôme Constant established a new differentiation between the genera Pylaemenes and Orestes in January 2018, which was confirmed in 2021 by genetic analysis. According to this, Pylaemenes konchurangensis must be transferred to the genus Orestes.

== Terraristics ==
As of 2019/2020, a sexual stock collected by Bresseel and Constant in Kon Plông district is in breeding. Because the animals in both sexes closely resemble the description of Pylaemenes konchurangensis, Bresseel named them Orestes cf. konchurangensis 'Kong Plong' passed on.
