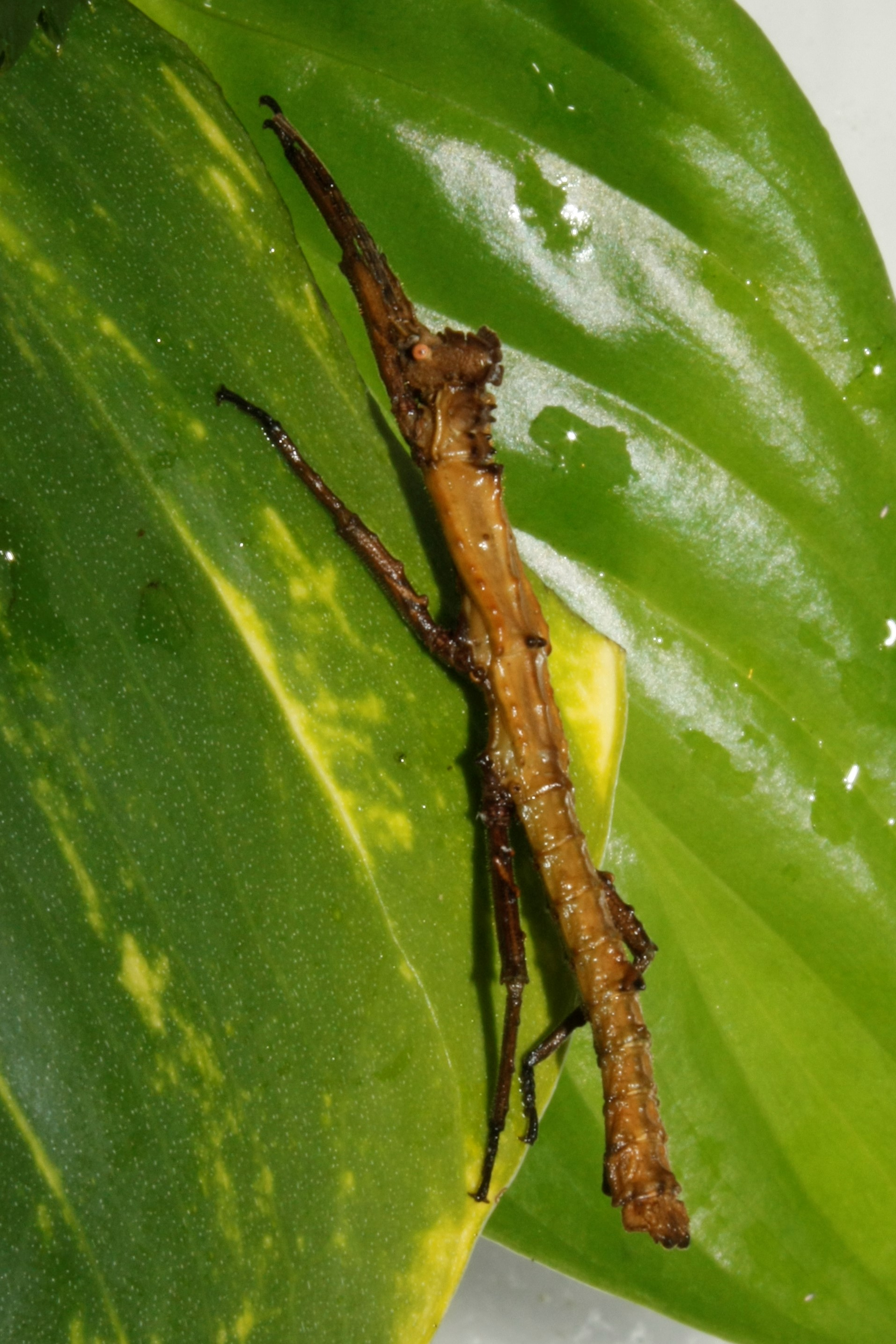
- Pylaemenes sepilokensis sepilokensis ♂

Scientific classification
- Domain: Eukaryota
- Kingdom: Animalia
- Phylum: Arthropoda
- Class: Insecta
- Order: Phasmatodea
- Superfamily: Bacilloidea
- Family: Heteropterygidae
- Subfamily: Dataminae
- Genus: Pylaemenes
- Species: P. sepilokensis

Binomial name
- Pylaemenes sepilokensis (Bragg, 1998)

Subspecies
- Pylaemenes sepilokensis sepilokensis (Bragg, 1998); Pylaemenes sepilokensis kinabaluensis Seow-Choen, 2016

Synonyms
- Datames borneensis sepilokensis Bragg, 1998; Pylaemenes borneensis sepilokensis (Bragg, 1998)

= Pylaemenes sepilokensis =

Species of stick insect

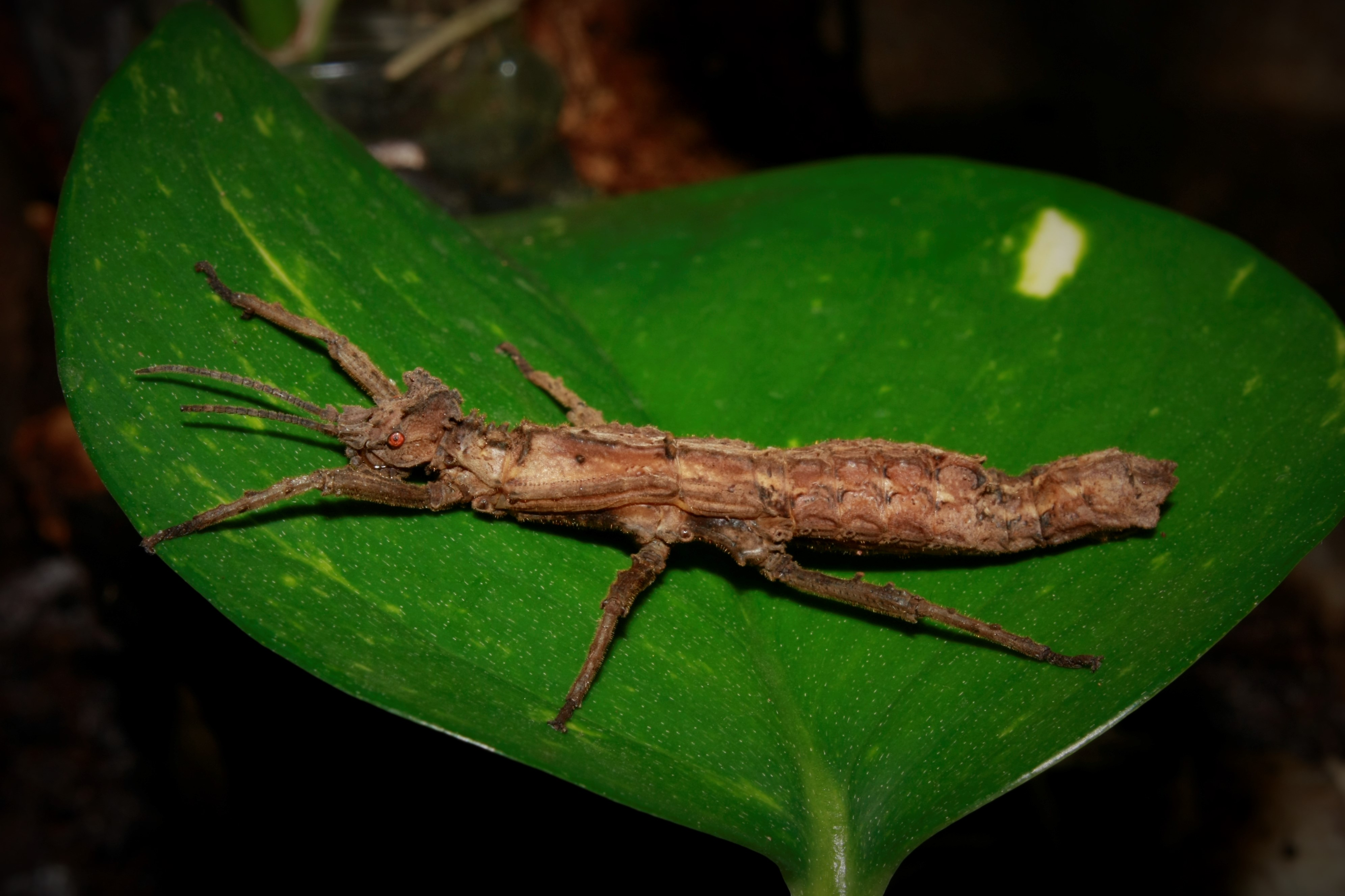
Pylaemenes s. sepilokensis ♀

Pylaemenes sepilokensis is a species of stick insects (Phasmatodea) that is found in Borneo, more precisely in the Malay state of Sabah.

== Description ==
The females reach a length of 45 to 48 millimetres (1.8 to 1.9 in) in the nominate subspecies. The males are 39 to 45 millimetres (1.5 to 1.8 in) long. Both sexes have orange eyes and a brown non-shiny coloration, slightly darker in males. This coloring and the strongly structured body surface ensure a phytomimesis in which the animals resemble the bark of trees.

The subspecies Pylaemenes sepilokensis kinabaluensis remains somewhat smaller. It is only 36.5 millimetres (1.44 in) long in males and 41 millimetres (1.6 in) in females. The animals differ from Pylaemenes sepilokensis sepilokensis by the mesonotum, which clearly tapers backwards. In the female it is 6.5 millimetres (0.26 in) wide in front and 5.5 millimetres (0.22 in) behind. In the male it tapers from 5.5 to 3.5 millimetres (0.22 to 0.14 in). Otherwise, the subspecies is morphologically similar to the nominate subspecies.

== Distribution area and reproduction ==
Pylaemenes sepilokensis has been found at various locations in Sandakan District, mostly in the Sepilok Forest Reserve. The subspecies Pylaemenes sepilokensis kinabaluensis was found in Kinabalu National Park on the edge of the road to Mount Kinabalu near the park headquarters. The species feeds on leaves of various Araceae, on Curculigo and Pandanus species.

The nocturnal animals hide during the day and usually react when disturbed by apparent death. The females lay one, more rarely two, eggs per week. These are brown, 3.5 millimetres (0.14 in) long and 2.5 millimetres (0.098 in) wide. Its surface is covered with approx. 0.5 millimetres (0.020 in) long hairs with a double hook at the end. After about 14 to 18 weeks, the nymphs, which are initially very light and about 11 millimetres (0.43 in) long, begin to hatch at night. As they grow, they often show shades of green in the otherwise light beige base coloration. It takes five to six months for males and six to eight months for females to become adults.

== Taxonomy ==
The species was described in 1998 by Philip E. Bragg as one of three subspecies of Datames borneensis. A female collected near Sandakan on June 29, 1927, was selected as the holotype. It was already in the F.M.S. Museum and was transferred to today's Naturalis Biodiversity Center in Leiden. Paratypes are two females and three males originating from the Sepilok Forest Reserve. The females were collected in September 1982 by C.L. Chan and are in his private collection together with one male paratype each collected in 1992 and 1994. The third male, also collected in 1994, is in the private collection of Francis Seow-Choen. Both the original species and the subspecies name refer to the locality.

Frank H. Hennemann synonymized the genus Datames with Pylaemenes in 1998 and includes only Pylaemenes coronatus, Pylaemenes oileus and Pylaemenes pusillus (now Planispectrum pusillum). Since the corresponding work appeared only a few days after the publication of Bragg's description, the three subspecies of Datames borneensis, among other things, have not yet been considered here. Pylaemenes borneensis sepilokensis and the other two subspecies were first mentioned in 2004 as representatives of this genus.

Seow-Choen elevated all three subspecies to species status in 2016. At the same time, he described Pylaemenes sepilokensis kinabaluensis, as a subspecies for the nominate form of Pylaemenes sepilokensis. Both the male holotype and female paratype were collected by Seow-Choen and Olivia Seow Wen in Kinabalu National Park in September 2011. Both types are deposited in the Sabah Parks Natural History Museum, also referred to as the "Kinabalu Park Museum", located at the Kinabalu National Park Headquarters.

In a molecular genetic study published in 2021, two samples referred to as Pylaemenes sepilokensis from different localities in Sabah, namely Sepilok and Tawau, were determined to be non-conspecific. According to this, the strain collected in Tawau must be another undescribed species.

== In terraristics ==
Pylaemenes sepilokensis was first collected for terraristics by Mark Bushell in the summer of 2001 in Borneo, more precisely near Sepilok, and brought to Europe. The species received the PSG number 245 from the Phasmid Study Group. After it had disappeared in the meantime, it has been bred again since 2015 after further imports by Ian Abercrombie. In addition to a breeding stock from Sepilok, there is another from Tawau, which has also been referred to as Pylaemenes sepilokensis, but must be assigned to a separate species. In contrast to most other Datamini, hazel, bramble or other Rosaceae are not suitable as fodder plants in the long term. On the other hand, the species, like its closer relatives, can be kept and bred well with Epipremnum, Philodendron or Dieffenbachia species.

== Gallery ==
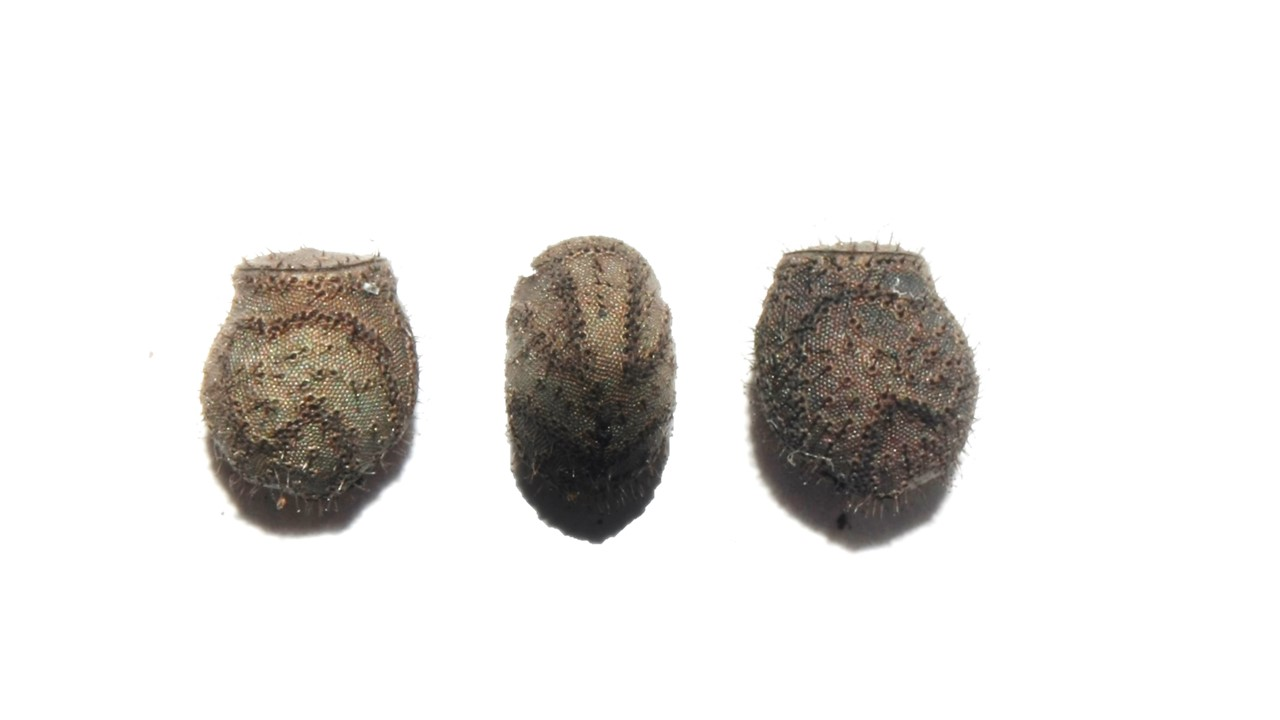
Pylaemenes s. sepilokensis, eggs

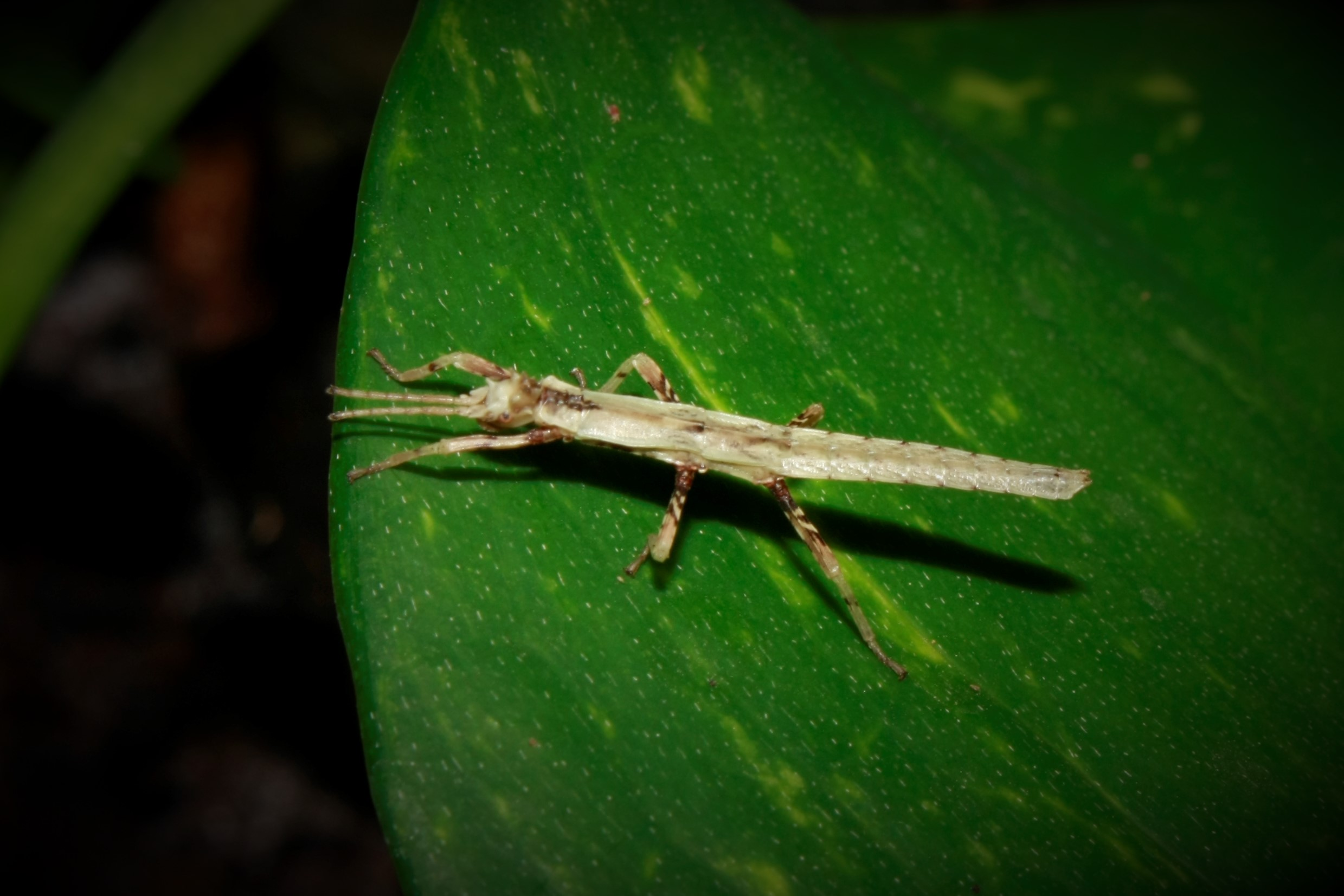
Pylaemenes s. sepilokensis, nymph

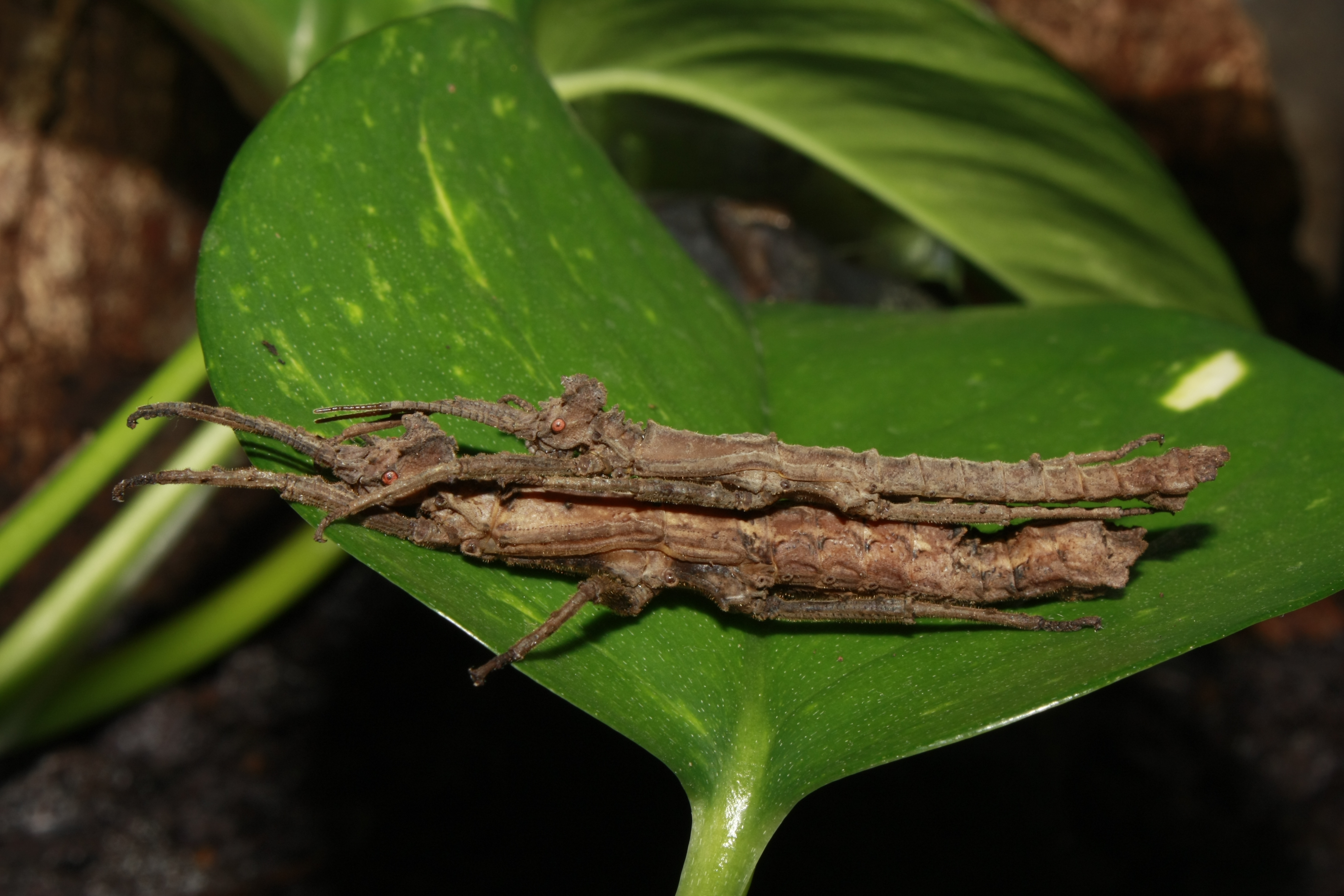
Pylaemenes s. sepilokensis, pair

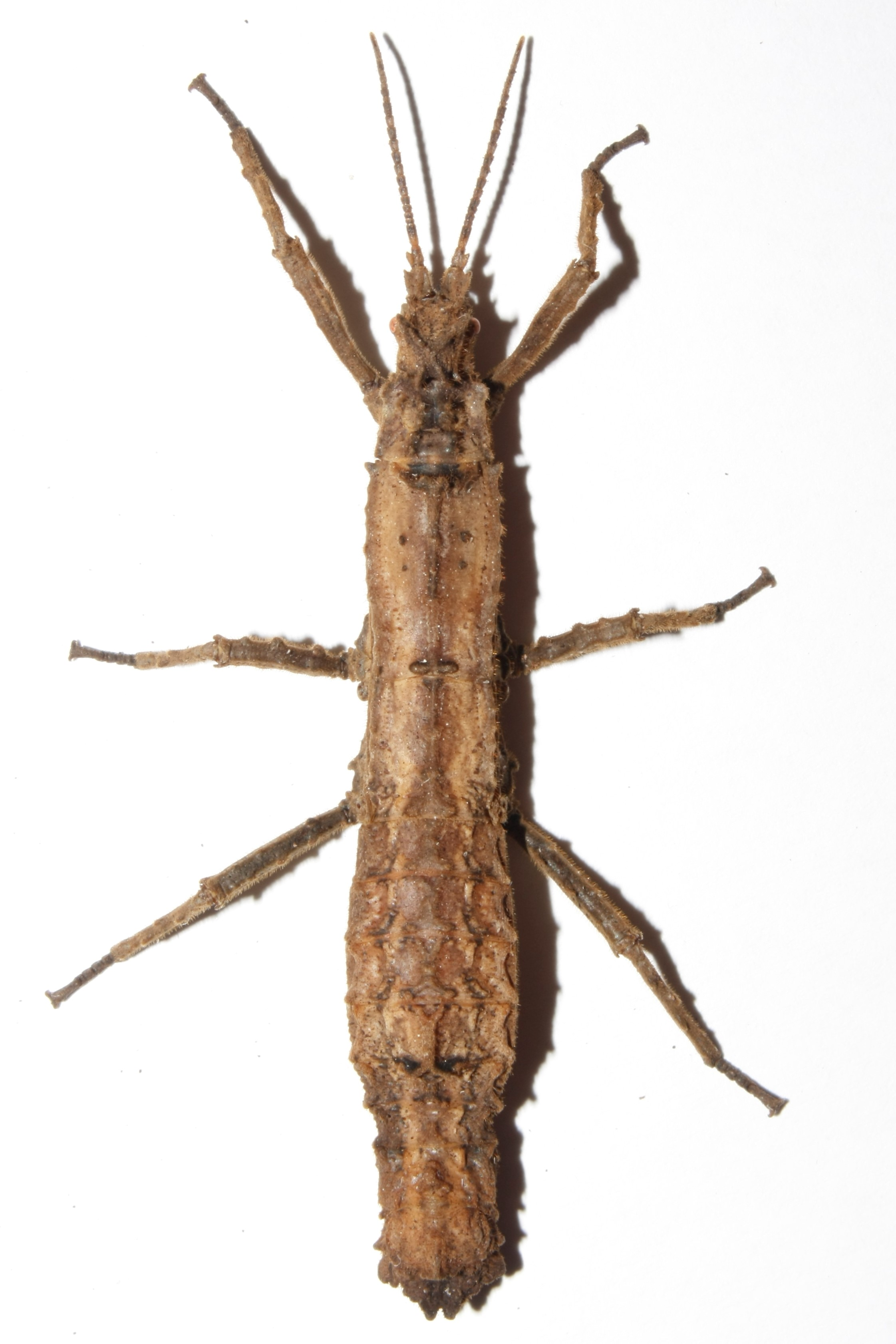
Pylaemenes s. sepilokensis, ♀ from dorsal

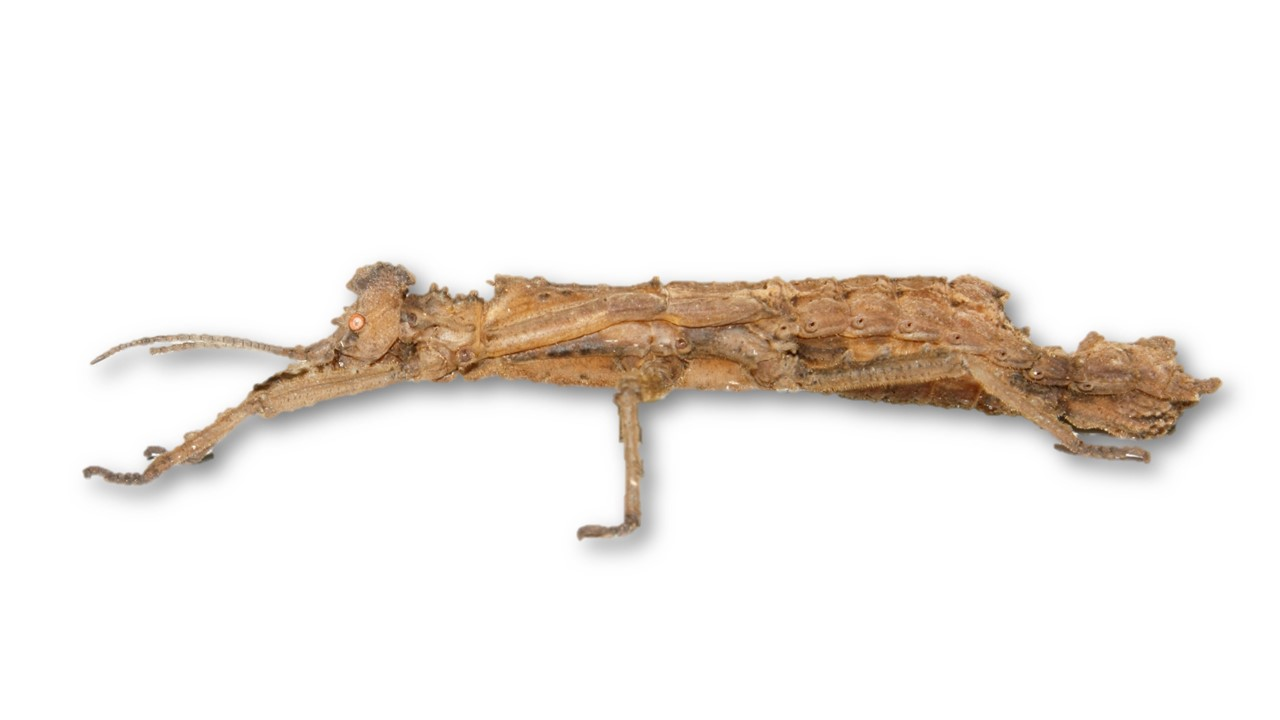
Pylaemenes s. sepilokensis, ♀ lateral
