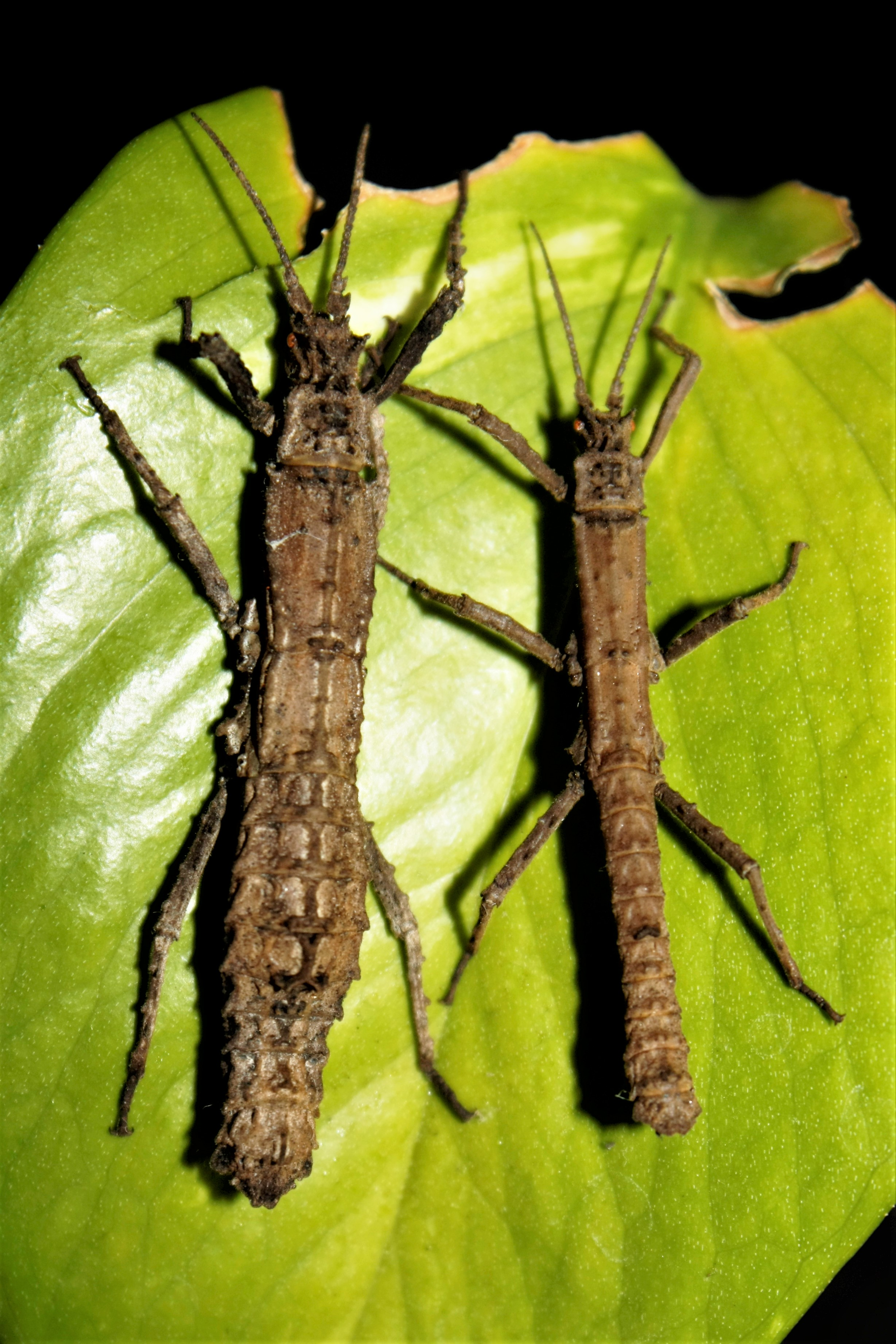
- Pair of Pylaemenes sepilokensis from Tawau

Scientific classification
- Kingdom: Animalia
- Phylum: Arthropoda
- Clade: Pancrustacea
- Class: Insecta
- Order: Phasmatodea
- Superfamily: Bacilloidea
- Family: Heteropterygidae
- Subfamily: Dataminae
- Genus: Pylaemenes; Stål, 1875

Type species
- Pylaemenes coronatus (de Haan, 1842)

Species
- List: Pylaemenes abramovi; Pylaemenes borneensis; Pylaemenes coronatus; Pylaemenes elenamikhailorum; Pylaemenes enganoensis; Pylaemenes gravidus; Pylaemenes gulinqingensis; Pylaemenes konchurangensis; Pylaemenes konkakinhensis; Pylaemenes longispinus; Pylaemenes mitratus; Pylaemenes moluccanus; Pylaemenes muluensis; Pylaemenes nullispinus; Pylaemenes oileus; Pylaemenes otys; Pylaemenes pleurospinosus; Pylaemenes pui; Pylaemenes scrupeus; Pylaemenes sepilokensis; Pylaemenes spiniventris; Pylaemenes waterstradti

Synonyms
- Datames Stål, 1875; Pyloemenes Bradley & Galil, 1977

= Pylaemenes (insect) =

Genus of stick insects

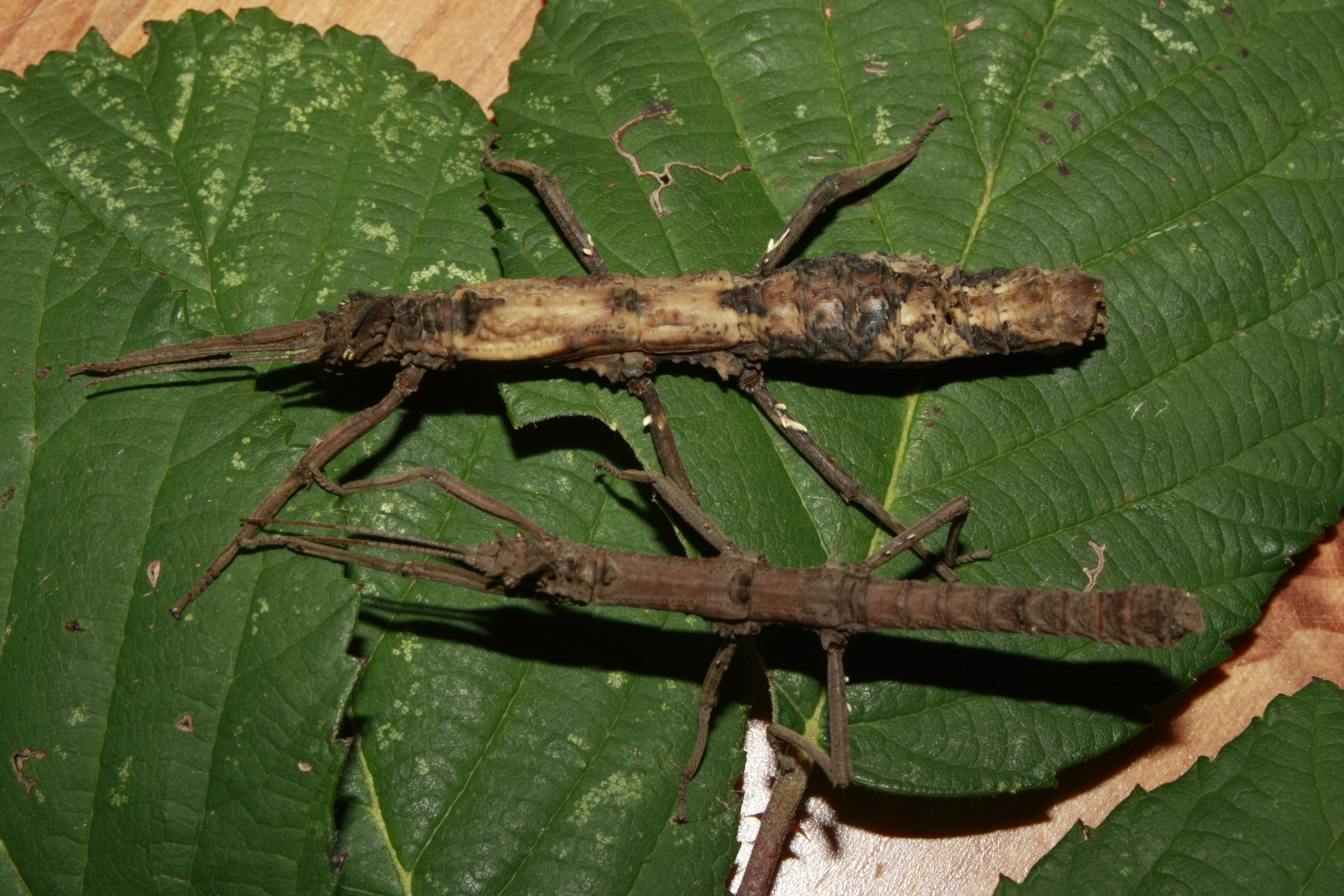
Pair of Pylaemenes mitratus from Kota Bharu

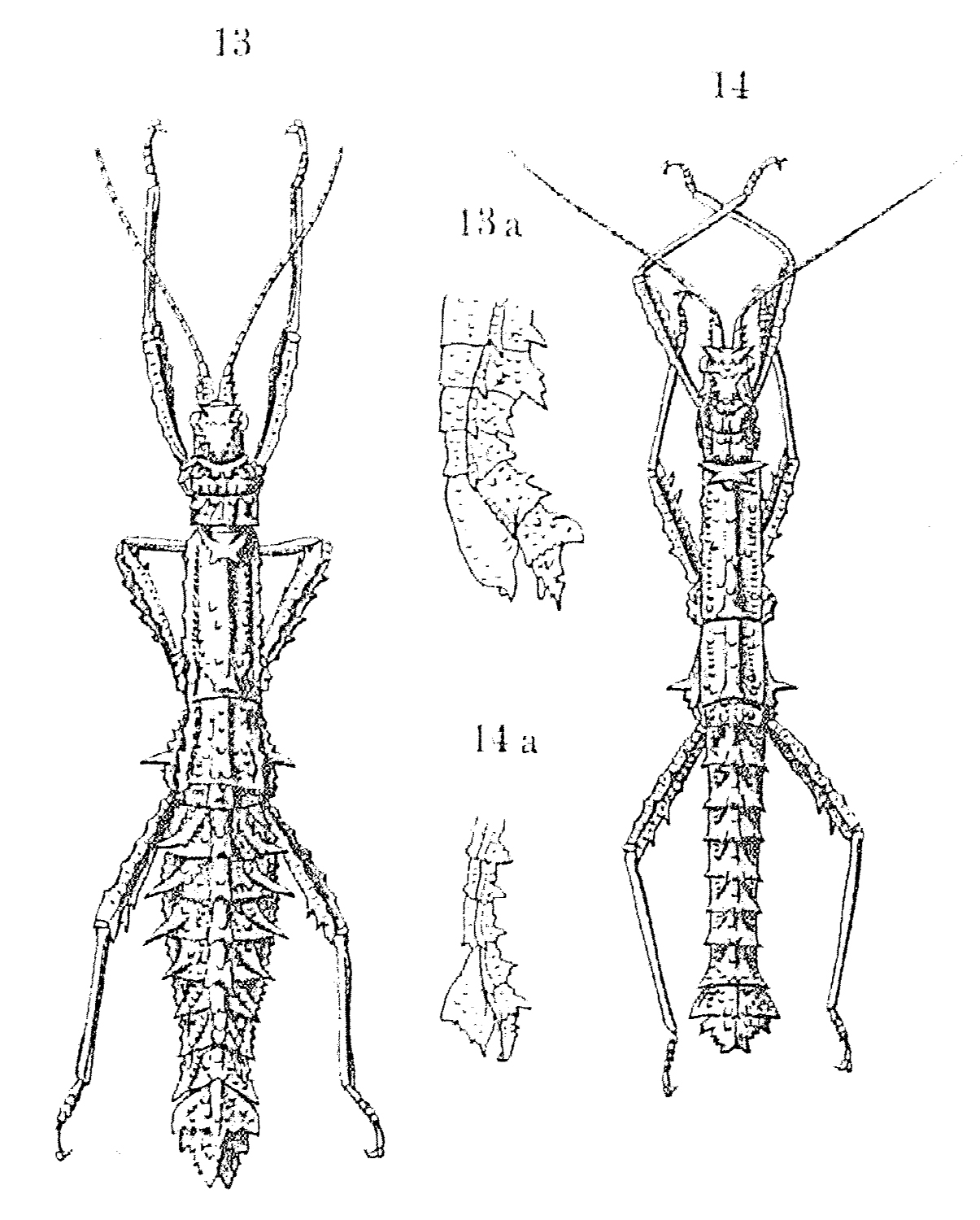
Pair of Pylaemenes coronatus, image from Redtenbacher 1906

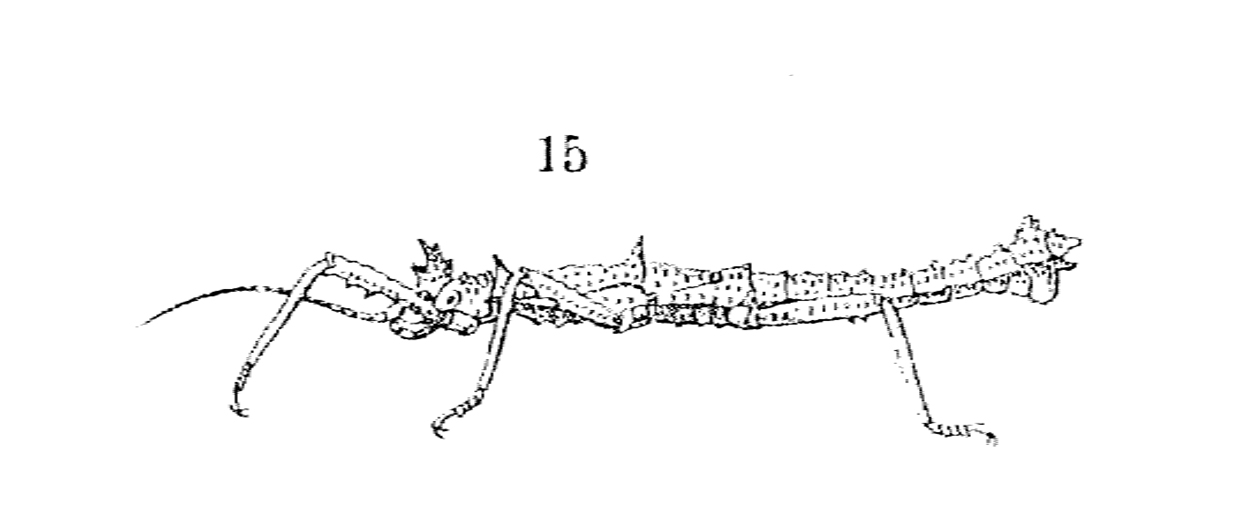
Male of Pylaemenes oileus, Dimage from Redtenbacher 1906, there named as Datames oileus bezeichnet

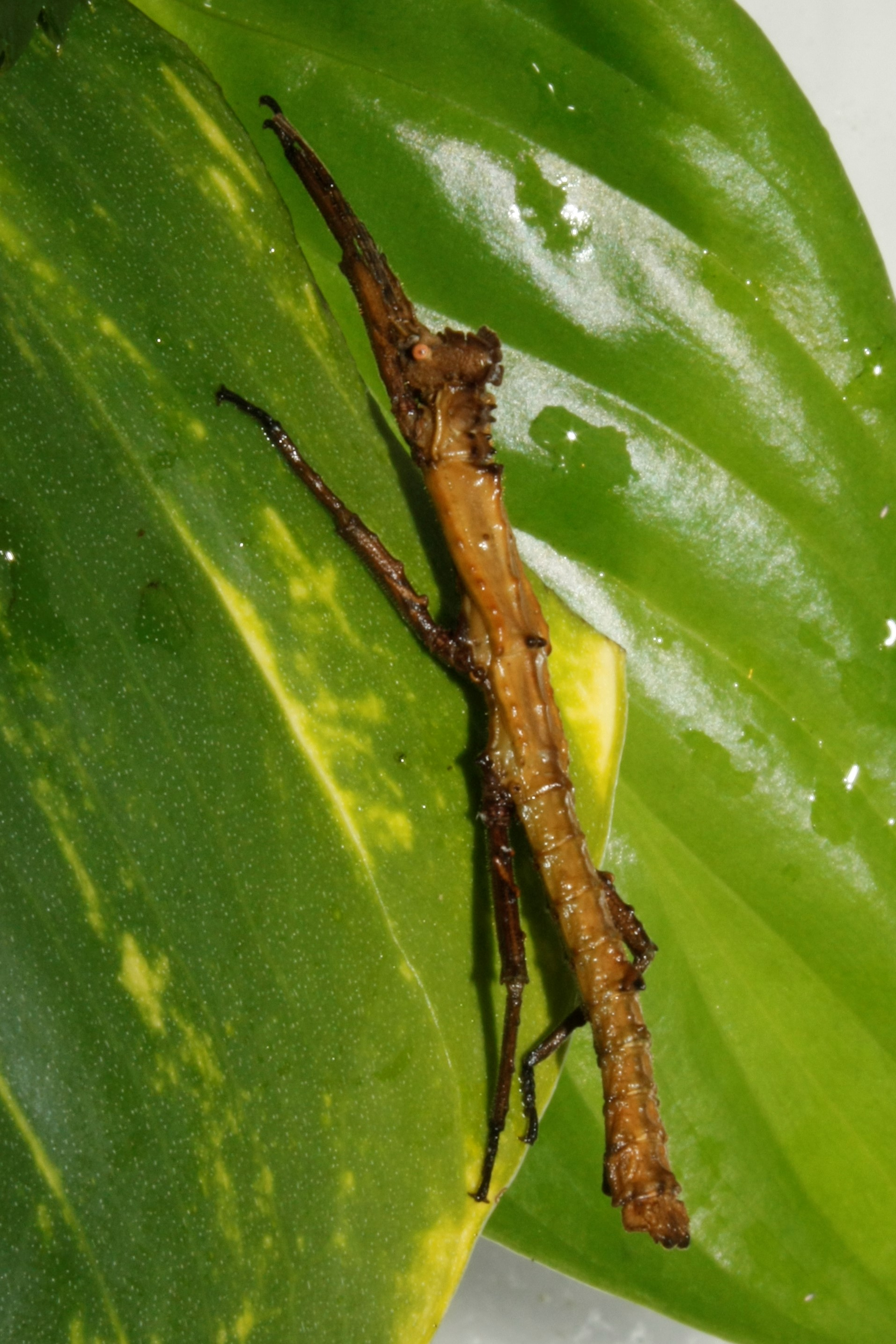
Male of Pylaemenes sepilokensis 'Sepilok'

Pylaemenes is a genus of stick insects in the family Heteropterygidae and subfamily Dataminae. It combines small to medium-sized, often brightly colored Phasmatodea species. Their representatives are found in large parts of Southeast Asia.

== Characteristics ==
The average size of representatives of this genus in the male sex is between 3.5 to 5.0 centimetres (1.4 to 2.0 in) and between 4.0 to 6.0 centimetres (1.6 to 2.4 in) in the females. All species are always wingless. The basic color of adult animals is usually a light beige or brown, which can be supplemented by almost white, brown or black markings depending on the species and gender. On the forehead, which becomes narrower towards the top, there are clear elevations that are differently designed depending on the type. The antennae are considerably longer than the femura of forelegs. One to three teeth can be found on the outer edge of the first antenna segment. The body surface is mostly covered with tubercles. In contrast to the genus Orestes, the Meso- and Metanotum are flattened or slightly roof-shaped, with a clearly raised central keel and two lateral longitudinal keels. The pronotum is significantly shorter than half the mesonotum. Large elevations arranged in pairs can often be found on the front edge of the mesonotum, which in males can also be formed as spines. The abdomen of the males is slender and, unlike in Orestes, the ninth tergite is strongly widened towards the rear. The abdomen of adult females is severely swollen, especially in the front half. In contrast to Orestes, the last segment (anal segment) is strongly triangularly tapered towards the rear and notched at the end. Depending on the species, especially in males, pairs of spines can be present in certain places on the thorax and abdomen. As with all Dataminae, the females of the genus Pylaemenes have no ovipositor to lay their eggs.

== Distribution area ==
The distribution area of the genus Pylaemenes includes large parts of Southeast Asia. Their representatives can be found in many areas of the Malay Archipelago and here especially on Borneo. There are also species on the Malay Peninsula, in Thailand and in China.

== Way of life ==
The nocturnal animals only come out of their hiding places in the leafy layer of the ground or on or behind the bark when it is dark. They are very lazy during the day. When they are discovered they play dead by stretching their hind legs back, the frore and middle legs forward and close to the body. The eggs can be more arched on the dorsal side and often have short hairs. The micropylar plate has three arms, with one arm pointing towards the lid, while the other two run more or less circularly around the egg. The eggs are usually laid on the ground, clamped in the bark near the ground or attached to plants such as mosses.

- - - Pylaemenes sp. 'Kubah'
    - - Pylaemenes sepilokensis 'Sepilok'
      - Pylaemenes sepilokensis 'Tawau'
  - - Pylaemenes pui
    - - Pylaemenes coronatus
      - Orestes

Relationships of the genetic analysis examined Pylaemenes species and the position of Orestes within it by Sarah Bank et al. (2021)

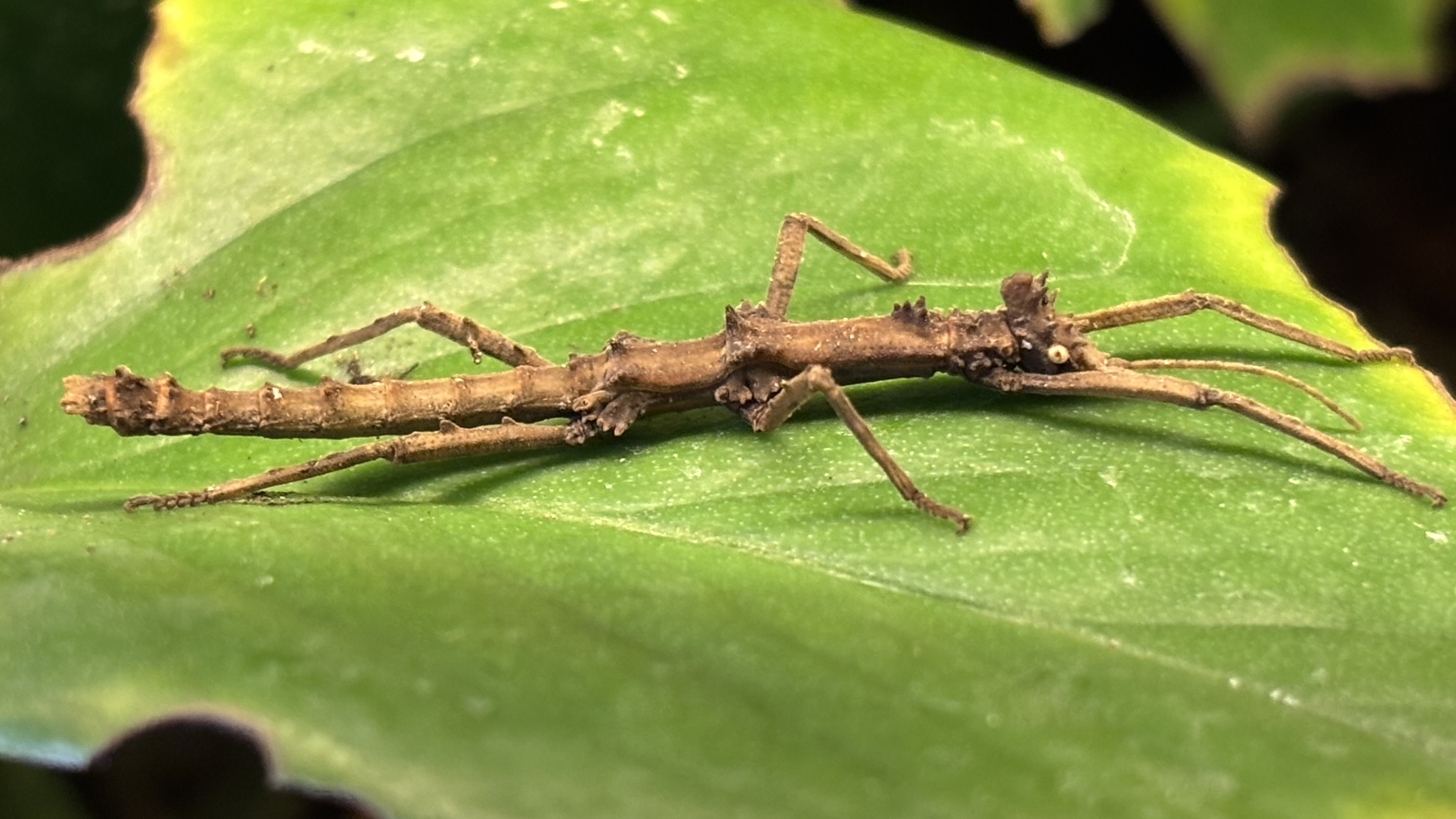
Male of Pylaemenes scrupeus

== Taxonomy ==
In 1875 Carl Stål established the genus Pylaemenes for some species that were previously listed in the genus Acanthoderus. Of the species originally rearranged by him, only Pylaemenes coronatus remained in the genus. All others have turned out to be synonyms to other species or have turned out to be representatives of other genera. As namesake, Stål chose the Paphlagonian king Pylaemenes, a figure from Greek mythology. Since he had not specified a type species, William Forsell Kirby chose Pylaemenes coronatus in 1904, the oldest species listed in the genus at that time, which is still the type species.

In the same publication in which he described the genus Pylaemenes, Stål established 1875 the genus Datames for Acanthoderus mouhotii (today Orestes mouhotii) and Acanthoderus oileus, which he named after the Old Persian military leader Datames. James Abram Garfield Rehn specified Datames oileus in 1904 as type species of Datames. In the following years almost all newly described species were assigned to this genus. Frank H. Hennemann discovered in 1998 that the type species Datames oileus belongs to the genus Pylaemenes. He synonymed Datames and transferred all species that had previously belonged to Datames into the genus Pylaemenes.

In the revision of the genus Orestes and the description of six new species in this previously monotypic genus by Joachim Bresseel and Jérôme Constant in 2018, three species belonging to Pylaemenes were also transferred to the genus Orestes. In addition, the differentiation between the genera Orestes and Pylaemenes has been specified. Following this, some of the species described in Pylaemenes in the recent past belong into the genus Orestes, such as Pylaemenes elenamikhailorum, Pylaemenes konchurangensis and Pylaemenes konkakinhensis . A Species described by Thanasinchayakul in 2006 as Pylaemenes kasetsartii was not recognized by the ICZN Commission and has been listed as nomen nudum since 2019. In 2023, Francis Seow-Choen revalidated one subspecies and four species synonymized by Hennemann in 1998, of which Pylaemenes gravidus had, however, been revalidated earlier in 2023 by Hennemann himself.

In their genetic analysis study published in 2021 shows Sarah Bank et al. that the Pylaemenes species examined there cannot be assigned to a uniform clade. The three examined species occurring on Borneo form a common clade. Pylaemenes pui described from China in 2013, the sample of which came from Thailand, does not belong in this clade and according to Bresseel, must be assigned to a genus of its own. Pylaemenes coronatus can also be found in another clade, the sister group of which is the genus Orestes.

Valid species are:

- Pylaemenes abramovi Ho, 2018 - Vietnam
- Pylaemenes borneensis (Bragg, 1998)
- Pylaemenes coronatus (de Haan, 1842) - type species as Phasma coronatum de Haan, 1842, locality Java and Ambon Island
- Pylaemenes elenamikhailorum Seow-Choen, 2016 - Sabah
- Pylaemenes enganoensis Seow-Choen, 2020
- Pylaemenes gravidus Bates, 1865)

(syn. = Datames aequalis Rehn, J.A.G., 1904)

- Pylaemenes gulinqingensis Gao & Xie, 2022
- Pylaemenes konchurangensis Ho, 2018
- Pylaemenes konkakinhensis Ho, 2018
- Pylaemenes longispinus Seow-Choen, 2018
- Pylaemenes mitratus (Redtenbacher, 1906)

(syn. = Datames arietinus Redtenbacher, 1906)

- Pylaemenes moluccanus (Redtenbacher, 1906)
- Pylaemenes muluensis (Bragg, 1998)
- Pylaemenes nullispinus Seow-Choen, 2020
- Pylaemenes oileus (Westwood, 1859)

(syn. = Datames cylindripes Redtenbacher, 1906)

- Pylaemenes otys (Westwood, 1859)

(syn. = Pylaemenes infans Redtenbacher, 1906)

- Pylaemenes pleurospinosus Hennemann & Le Tirant, 2021
- Pylaemenes pui Ho, 2013 - Caiyanghe Nature Reserve, Pu'er, Yunnan Province in China and Chiang Mai Province in Thailand
- Pylaemenes scrupeus Bresseel & Jiaranaisakul, 2021
- Pylaemenes sepilokensis (Bragg, 1998)
  - Pylaemenes sepilokensis sepilokensis (Bragg, 1998)
  - Pylaemenes sepilokensis kinabaluensis Seow-Choen, 2016
- Pylaemenes spiniventris (Bates, 1865)
  - Pylaemenes spiniventris spiniventris (Bragg, 1998)
  - Pylaemenes spiniventris occipitalis (Kaup, 1871)
- Pylaemenes waterstradti (Bragg, 1998)

== Terraristic ==
Several species of the genus are present in the terrariums of enthusiasts. Pylaemenes mitratus was imported from the Malay Peninsula in 1999 by Francis Seow-Choen. The species received PSG number 212 from the Phasmid Study Group. Another stock of this species was imported in 2015 from Kota Bharu. The most widespread are two stocks which are kept as Pylaemenes sepilokensis. This species was first collected by Mark Bushell in summer 2001 on Borneo, more precisely near Sepilok Orangutan Rehabilitation Centre and brought to Europe. It received the PSG number 245. After it was lost in the meantime, it has been in breeding again since around 2015 after further imports. In addition to the stock from Sepilok, there is another one from Tawau. According to the studies by Sarah Bank et al. these stocks belong to different species.
