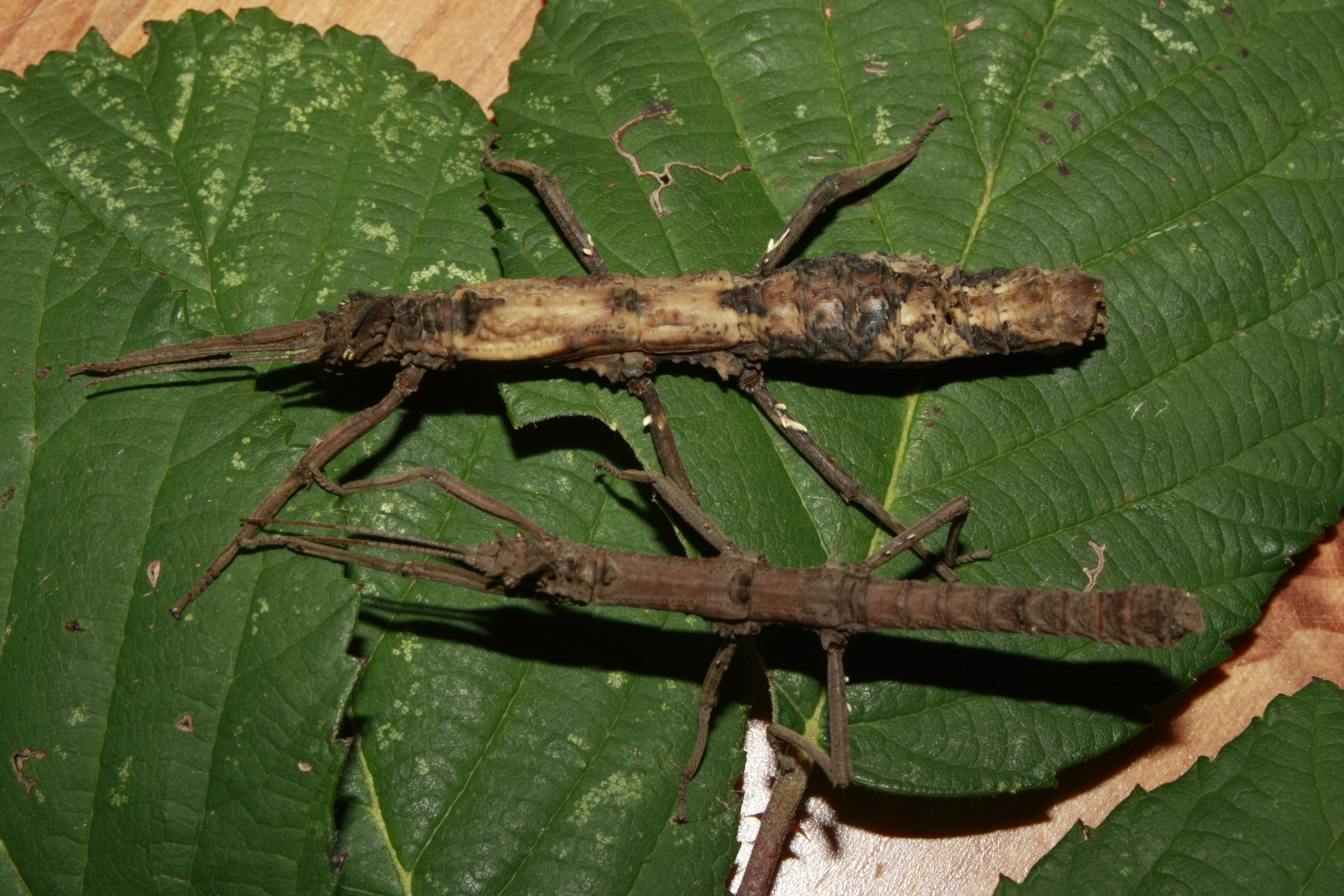
- Pylaemenes mitratus pair from Kota Bharu

Scientific classification
- Kingdom: Animalia
- Phylum: Arthropoda
- Clade: Pancrustacea
- Class: Insecta
- Order: Phasmatodea
- Superfamily: Bacilloidea
- Family: Heteropterygidae
- Subfamily: Dataminae
- Genus: Pylaemenes
- Species: P. mitratus

Binomial name
- Pylaemenes mitratus (Redtenbacher, 1906)

Synonyms
- Datames mitratus Redtenbacher, 1906; Datames arietinus Redtenbacher, 1906

= Pylaemenes mitratus =

Species of stick insect

Pylaemenes mitratus is a species of stick insects (Phasmatodea) native to Malay Peninsula and Sumatra. The species is also known by the common name money plant stick insect, which refers to the most well-known food plants, Epipremnum aureum, which is also known as money plant.

== Description ==
The females reach a length of 43 to 48 millimetres (1.7 to 1.9 in). The males are 37 to 43 millimetres (1.5 to 1.7 in) long. The species corresponds in its habitat to typical representatives of the Datamini and is similar in appearance to the Pylaemenes species from Borneo. Both sexes have a greatly enlarged and raised vertex structure on the head, which is formed from the rear head spines and the front edges of which converge towards the back and upwards in the shape of an inverted V. The supraantennas form a pair of laterally compressed spines in front, which are more prominent in males. Characteristic, at least for the females, is a conspicuous white spine on the upper side of the mesofemurs and two more on the metafemurs about a third away from the body. They are also found less prominently and somewhat smaller in males. The males have three pairs of individually differently pronounced pairs of spines on the upper side of their bodies. These are distributed over the pronotum, the posterior edge of the mesonotum and the fifth segment of the abdomen.

== Distribution area, way of life and reproduction ==
The species occurs throughout Malay Peninsula from Perak and Kelantan in the north to Singapore in the south. It is also widespread on Sumatra and has been found, for example, in the provinces of Riau and Sumatra Barat, but also on the offshore Mentawai Islands. The distribution of Pylaemenes mitratus on Sulawesi, as mentioned by Redtenbacher in the species description, is doubted by later authors.

The nocturnal animals hide during the day. At night they feed on Aidia wallichiana, Uruphyllum glabrum (both species of the plant family Rubiaceae), Uncaria gambir, various species of Dracaena, Dioscorea, Calamus (from the formerly genus Daemonorops), Rubus and Curculigo, as well as Dieffenbachia and Epipremnum. The eggs are laid by the females on the ground.

== Taxonomy ==
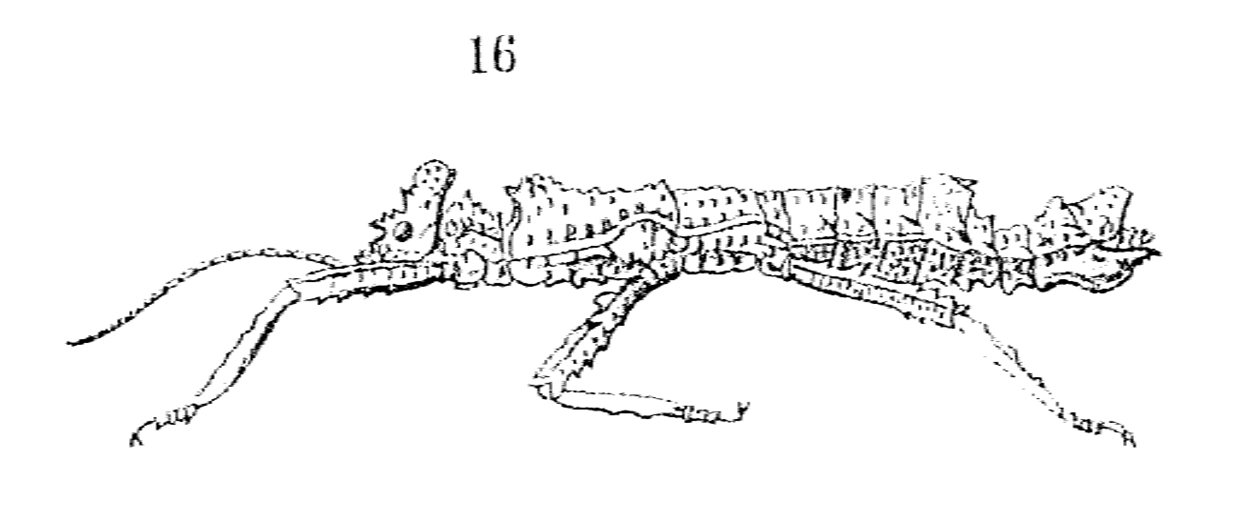
female of Pylaemenes mitratus, drawing from the original description by Redtenbacher 1906

Redtenbacher described the species in 1906 under the basionym Datames mitratus. He pictures a female and describes both sexes. As a reference, he names specimens from his collection and from the Natural History Museum in Berlin. A female from his collection used for the description can be found in the Natural History Museum in Vienna. It was collected in 1902 by Albert Grubauer in Perak on the Malay Peninsula and later determined to be the lectotype of the species. A female deposited in Berlin is said to have come from northern Celebes (now Sulawesi). It has been established as a paralectotype, but differs somewhat from the Malayan specimens. The male or males described by Redtenbacher have not yet been found. The species name refers to the shape of the forehead and compares it to the mitre, i.e. the headgear worn by bishops (Greek: mitre = μίτρα = "headband").

In 1906, Redtenbacher described Datames mitratus as well as Datames arietinus, naming collection specimens from the Museum of Genoa (today the Museo Civico di Storia Naturale Giacomo Doria) and the former Court Museum in Vienna (today the Natural History Museum in Vienna) as a reference. In the latter, their male lectotype and a male paralectotype are deposited, both of which were collected in 1902 by Grubauer on Sumatra. The specimens from the museum in Genoa mentioned by Redtenbacher are a male and a female, which were collected in May or June 1894 by Elio Modigliani on Sumatra. Like another female from the ETH Zurich, they are paralectotypes of the species. Two other females from the collection of Hans Fruhstorfer, collected on Sumatra in 1898 and deposited in Vienna, were initially also considered to be paralectotypes of Datames arietinus. They were recognized in 2018 by Francis Seow-Choen as representatives of an as yet undescribed species and re-described together with a male holotype and other paratypes as Pylaemenes longispinus. The species name of Datames arietinus, like that of Pylaemenes mitratus, refers to the head shape of the animals and compares it with that of a ram or aries (Latin or Italian: ariete = ram).

The lectotypes of Datames arietinus and Datames mitratus were established by Paul D. Brock in 1995. Both species were synonymous with others as early as 1935 by Klaus Günther with Datames oileus (current name Pylaemenes oileus). In 2000, Seow-Choen revalidated the species Datames mitratus in the genus Pylaemenes as Pylaemenes mitratus after comparing it with representatives of Pylaemenes oileus from Java. The reassignment of the genus had become necessary since Datames had already been synonymized with Pylaemenes in 1998. Datames arietinus, on the other hand, was initially either assigned to Pylaemenes oileus or wrongly also to Pylaemenes coronatus, also referring to Günther 1935. The reassignment of the genus had become necessary since Datames had already been synonymized with Pylaemenes in 1998. In 2018, Seow-Choen referred to the types of Datames arietinus that remained after the description of Pylaemenes longispinus as conspecific to Pylaemenes mitratus. In 2020 he explicitly lists them as their synonym.

== In terraristics ==
Pylaemenes mitratus was collected for terraristics by Seow-Choen from Malay Peninsula in 1999 and sent to Europe. The species received PSG number 212 from the Phasmid Study Group. Another stock of this species was imported from Kota Bharu in 2015. In contrast to most other Datamini, hazel, bramble or other Rosaceae are not suitable as fodder plants in the long term. On the other hand, the species, like its closer relatives from Borneo, can be kept and propagated well with and bred well with Epipremnum, Philodendron or Dieffenbachia species.
