= Pylaemenes konkakinhensis =

Scientific classification
- Domain: Eukaryota
- Kingdom: Animalia
- Phylum: Arthropoda
- Class: Insecta
- Order: Phasmatodea
- Superfamily: Bacilloidea
- Family: Heteropterygidae
- Subfamily: Dataminae
- Genus: Pylaemenes
- Species: P. konkakinhensis

Binomial name
- Pylaemenes konkakinhensis Ho, 2018

Species of stick insect

Pylaemenes konkakinhensis is a species of stick insects native in Vietnam. The species is so far only known from a single female.

== Characteristics ==
Pylaemenes konkakinhensis is a robust elongated species that has very few structures on the body surface and is very similar to the Pylaemenes konchurangensis described at the same time. It is characterized by two tubercles on the outer edge of the first antenna segment, the absence of granular tubercles in the rear, lateral area of the fourth tergite of the abdomen and those at the end pointed subgenital plate of the abdomen distinguishable. The described female is 47 millimetres (1.9 in) long, has 14 millimetres (0.55 in) long antennae] and a 3.5 millimetres (0.14 in) long head. There are two pairs of tubercles on the top of the head between the eyes. The front pair is larger than the rear. The back of the head is raised and has a short, V-shaped crest on top. The back edge of the head shows six small tubercles. The square pronotum is 3 millimetres (0.12 in) long and shows no rows of granules along the sides of the longitudinal furrow. Its front edge is curved inwards. At 10 millimetres (0.39 in) in length, the mesonotum is significantly longer than the 4 millimetres (0.16 in) long metanotum and the 2 millimetres (0.079 in) long median segment combined. It is almost parallel-sided and only slightly extended to the rear. A longitudinal line in the middle is only indistinctly visible. Its front and rear margins are slightly raised. The metanotum is rectangular, longer than wide and also shows only an indistinct center line. On the fourth to seventh tergite of the abdomen there are medial X-shaped edges. The second to fourth tergites widen backwards, while the fifth and sixth tergites tapers backwards. The seventh tergite has an inflated, hump-like area in the middle in the rear area, which is called the preopercular organ. In the middle, at the back of the ninth tergite, there is an elongated crest, the tip of which is clearly notched. The species shows a coloration in which light beige and brown tones are complemented by a contrasting pattern of almost white, dark brown and black spots. This drawing is more typical for females of the genus Orestes.

== Taxonomy ==
George Ho Wai-Chun described the species in July 2018 as Pylaemenes konkakinhensis based on a single female found by Alexei V. Abramov from Russia in May 2016 at an altitude of 900 metres (3,000 ft) in the western part of the Kon Ka Kinh National Park in the Vietnamese Gia Lai Province. This female is deposited as holotype at the Manchester Museum of the University of Manchester. The species name refers to the place where the animal was found.

As part of the description of six new Orestesspecies from Vietnam, Joachim Bresseel and Jérôme Constant established a new differentiation between the genera Pylaemenes and Orestes in January 2018, which was confirmed in 2021 by genetic analysis. According to this, Pylaemenes konkakinhensis must be transferred to the genus Orestes.
