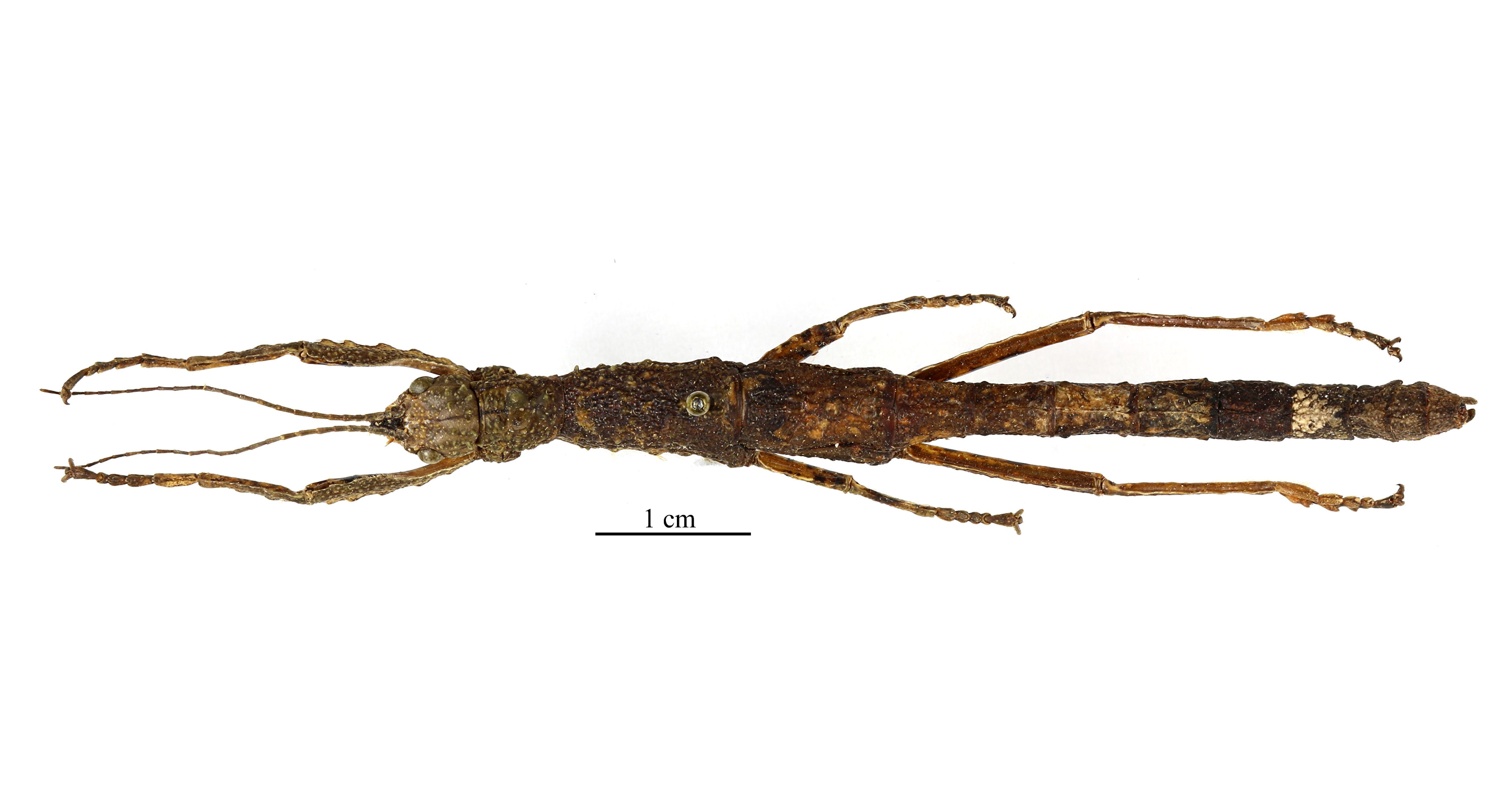

Scientific classification
- Domain: Eukaryota
- Kingdom: Animalia
- Phylum: Arthropoda
- Class: Insecta
- Order: Phasmatodea
- Superfamily: Aschiphasmatoidea
- Family: Damasippoididae; Zompro, 2004

= Damasippoididae =

Family of insects

Damasippoididae is a family of walkingsticks in the order Phasmatodea. There are at least two genera and about six described species in Damasippoididae, found in Madagascar.

== Genera ==
These two genera belong to the family Damasippoididae:

- Damasippoides Brancsik, 1893
- Pseudoleosthenes Redtenbacher, 1906

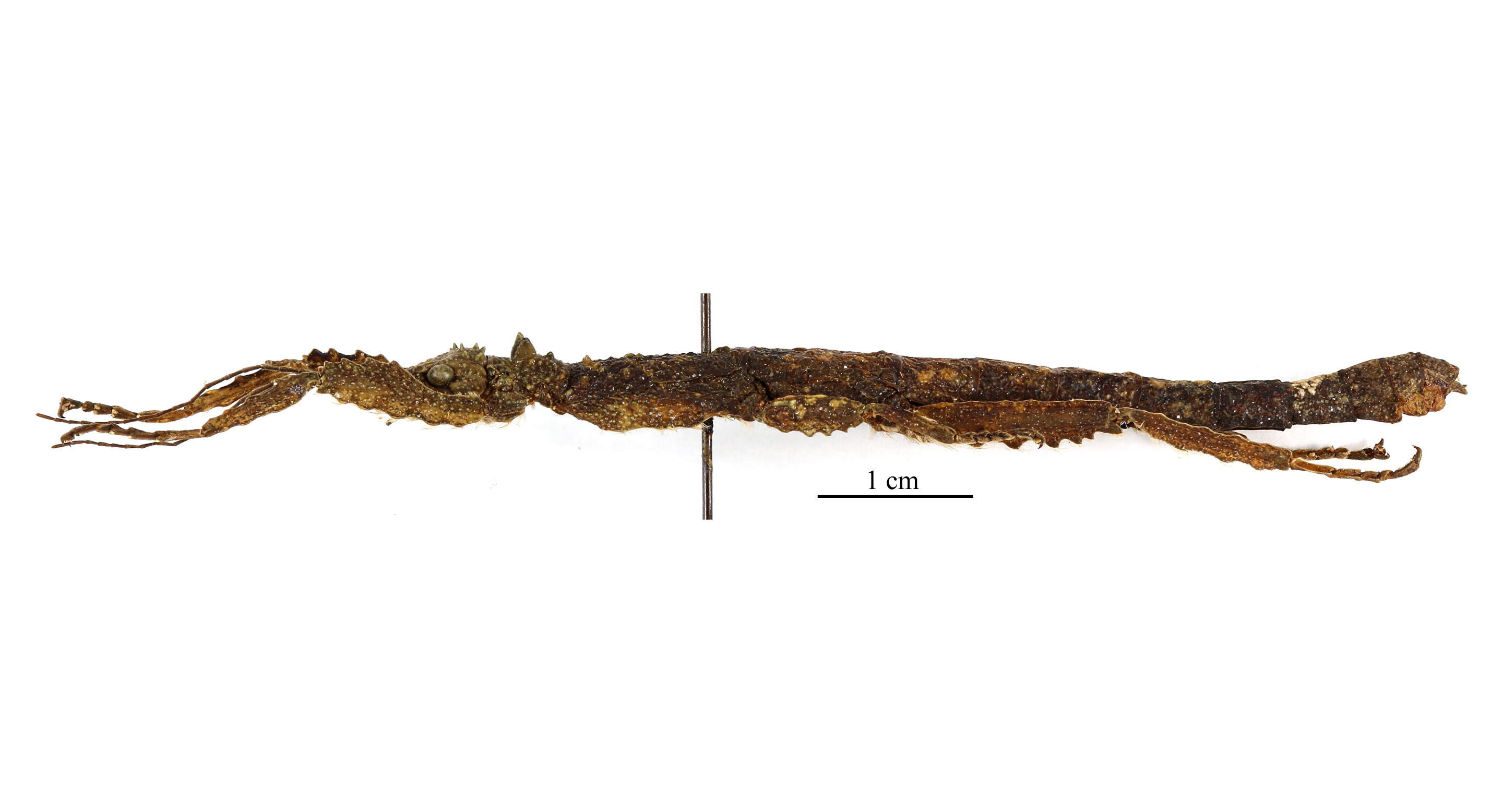
Side view of mounted Pseudoleosthenes dubiosus
