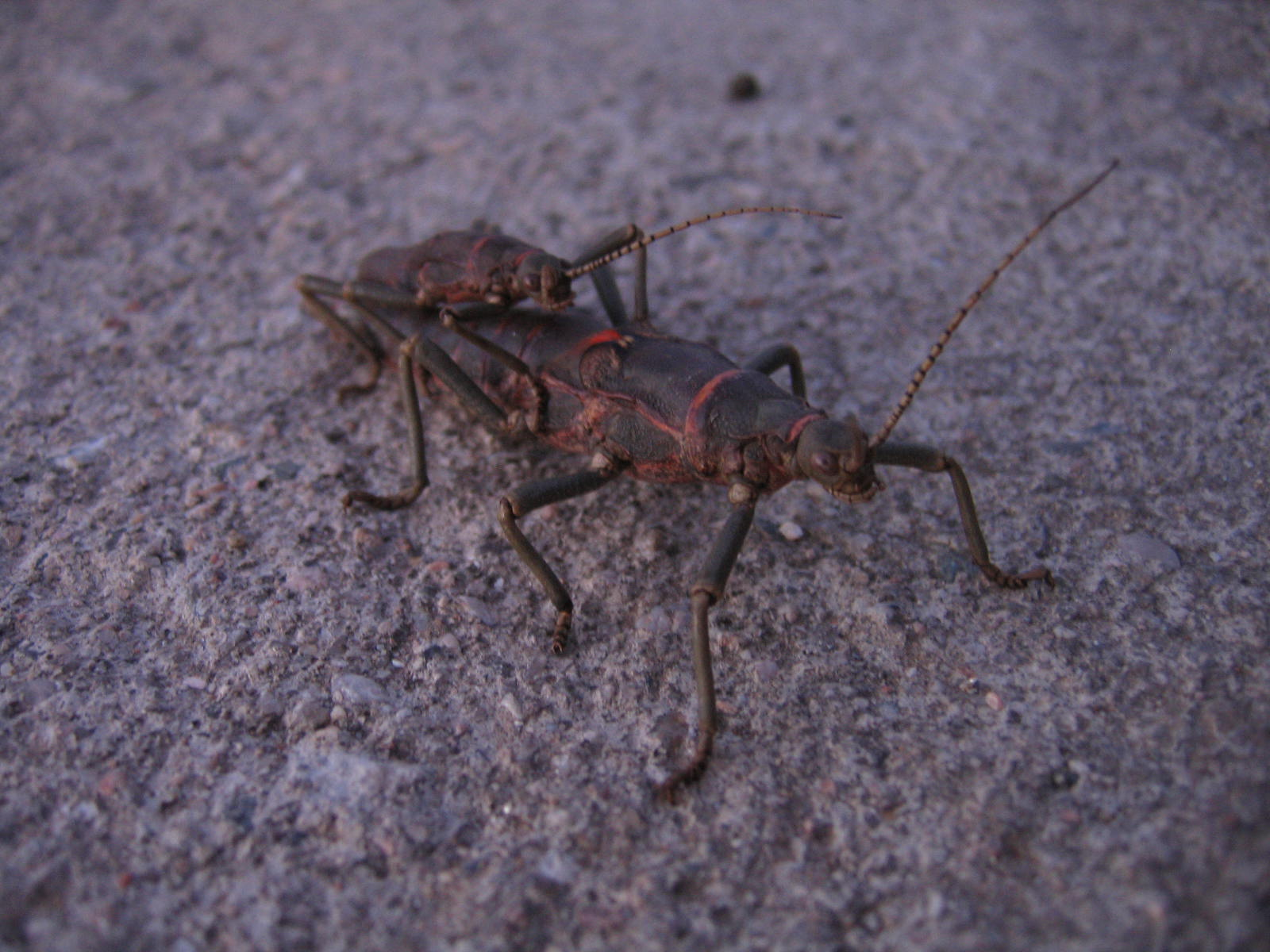
- Agathemera crassa

Scientific classification
- Kingdom: Animalia
- Phylum: Arthropoda
- Class: Insecta
- Order: Phasmatodea
- Suborder: Euphasmatodea
- Superfamily: Pseudophasmatoidea
- Family: Agathemeridae; Engel & Bradler, 2024
- Genus: Agathemera; Stål, 1875

Synonyms
- Paradoxomorpha Brancsik, 1898

= Agathemera =

Genus of stick insects

Agathemera is a genus of stick insects in the suborder Euphasmatodea and superfamily Pseudophasmatoidea. It consists of several species limited to the mountainous regions of Argentina, Bolivia, Chile and Peru.

This genus is the sole representative of the monotypic family Agathemeridae and tribe Agathemerini; it was also placed in the suborder Agathemerodea, but the latter is now considered of doubtful validity.

== Species ==
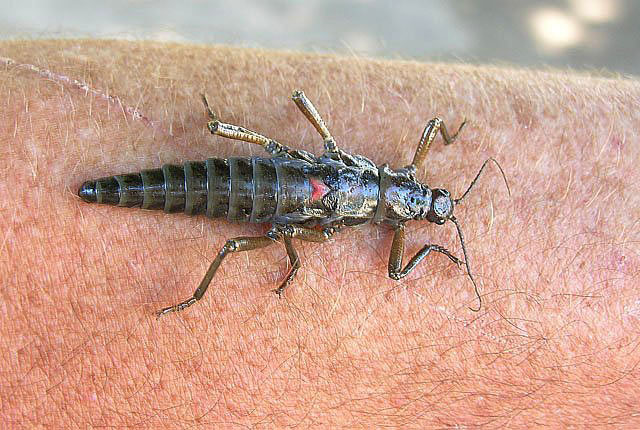
Agathemera maculafulgens

The Phasmida Species File includes following species:

1. Agathemera claraziana (Saussure, 1868)
2. Agathemera crassa (Blanchard, 1851) - type species (as Anisomorpha pardalina Westwood)
3. Agathemera elegans (Philippi, 1863)
4. Agathemera grylloides (Westwood, 1859)
5. Agathemera luteola Camousseight, 2006
6. Agathemera maculafulgens Camousseight, 1995
7. Agathemera mesoauriculae Camousseight, 1995
8. Agathemera millepunctata Redtenbacher, 1906
