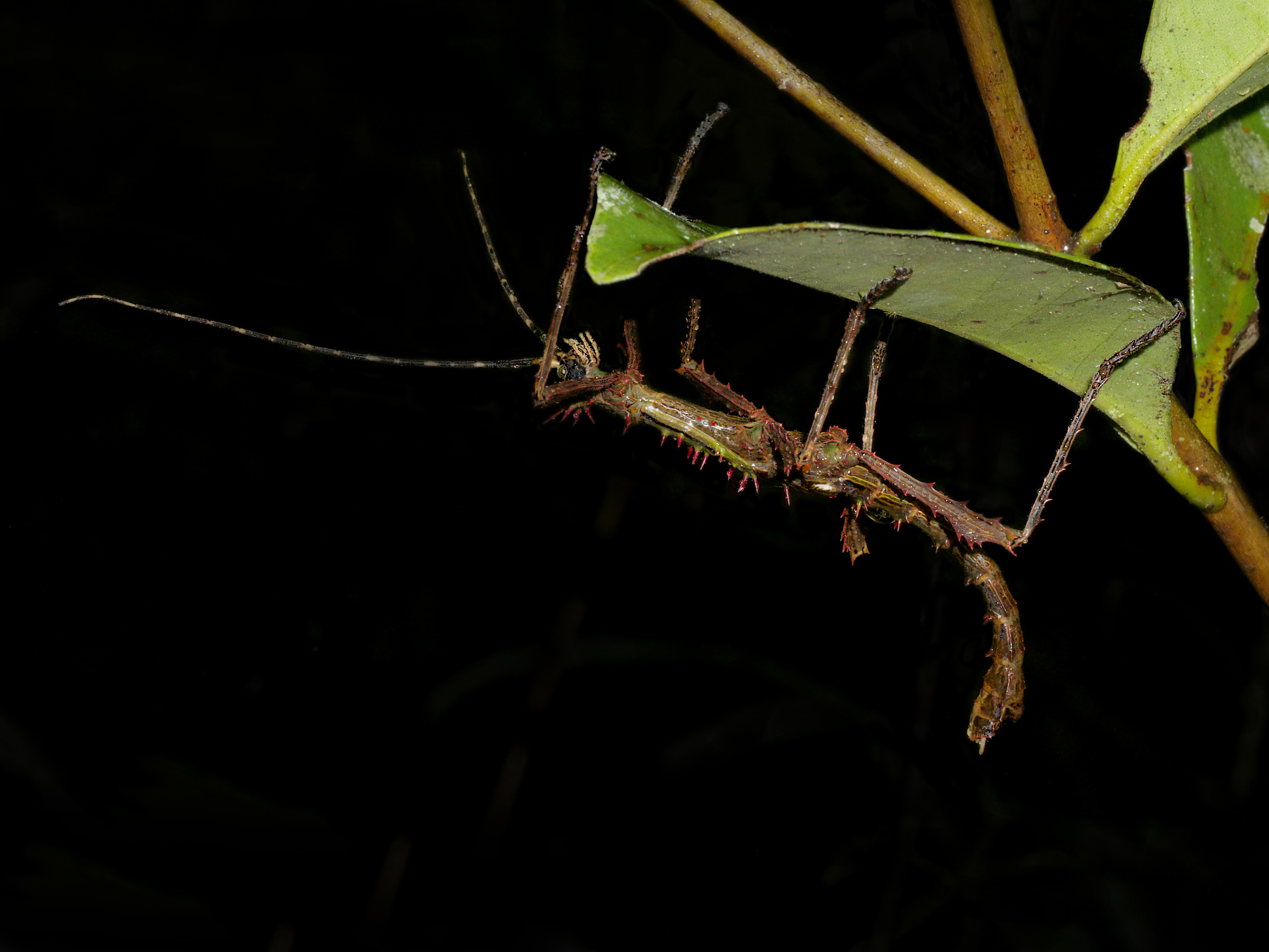
- Parectatosoma sp.

Scientific classification
- Domain: Eukaryota
- Kingdom: Animalia
- Phylum: Arthropoda
- Class: Insecta
- Order: Phasmatodea
- Superfamily: Bacilloidea
- Family: Anisacanthidae; Günther, 1953

= Anisacanthidae =

Family of stick insects

Anisacanthidae is a family of stick insects in the superfamily Bacilloidea. There are at least 30 described species in Anisacanthidae, all from Madagascar.

== Genera ==
The Phasmida Species File includes 3 subfamilies:

=== Anisacanthinae ===
Monotypic subfamily: all in tribe Anisacanthini Günther, 1953

1. Anisacantha Redtenbacher, 1906
2. Paranisacantha Cliquennois, 2008
3. Parectatosoma Wood-Mason, 1879
4. Somacantha Cliquennois, 2008

=== Leiophasmatinae ===
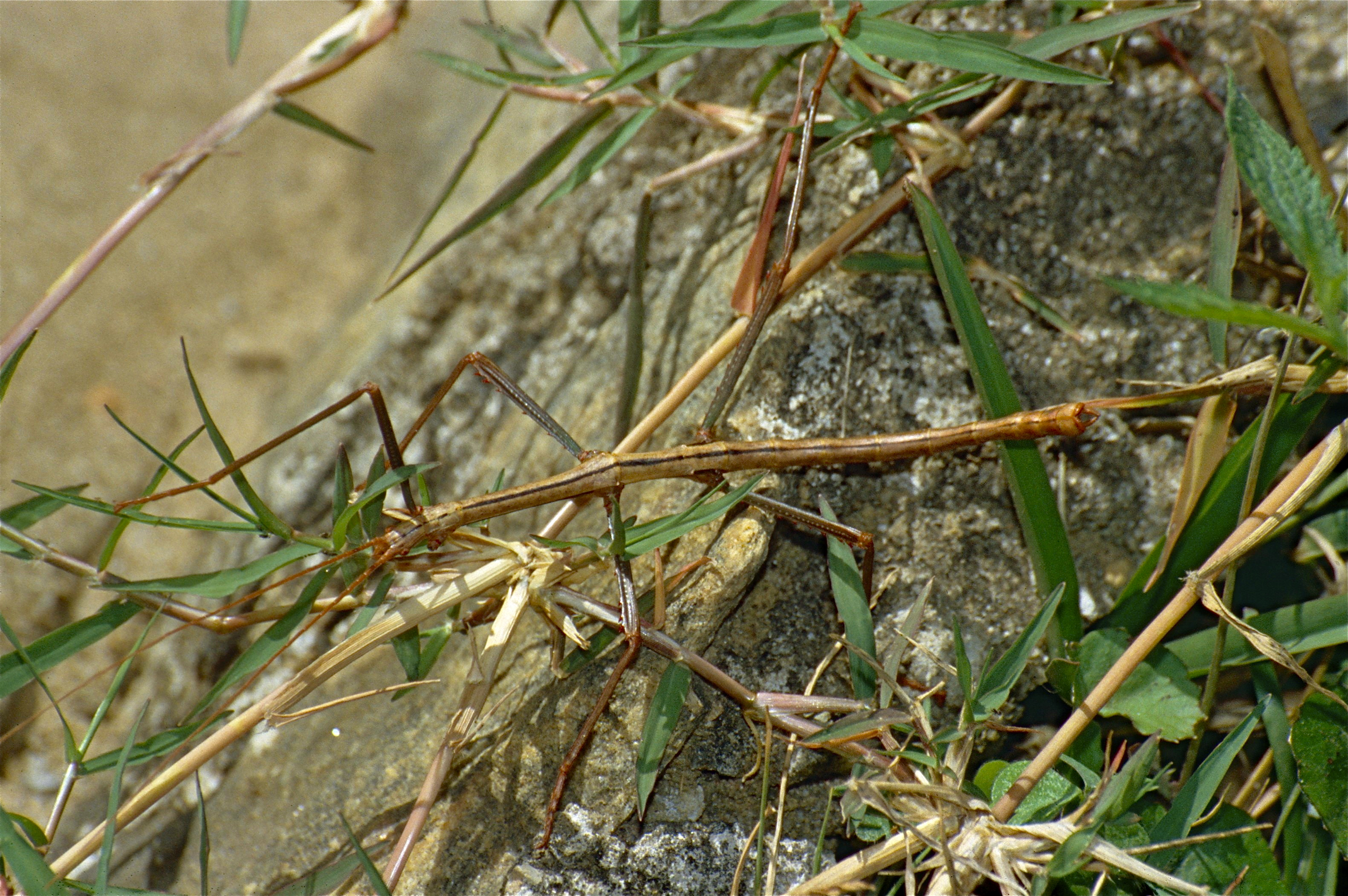
Unidentified Leiophasma male

Auth. Cliquennois, 2008

1. Adelophasma Cliquennois, 2018
2. Amphiphasma Cliquennois, 2008
3. Leiophasma Uvarov, 1940

=== Xerantherinae ===
Auth. Cliquennois, 2008

1. Archantherix Cliquennois, 2008
2. Cenantherix Cliquennois, 2008
3. Parorobia Chopard, 1952
4. Xerantherix Brancsik, 1893
