= Anisacantha =

Scientific classification
- Domain: Eukaryota
- Kingdom: Animalia
- Phylum: Arthropoda
- Class: Insecta
- Order: Phasmatodea
- Family: Anisacanthidae
- Genus: Anisacantha; Redtenbacher, 1906
- Species: A. difformis

Binomial name
- Anisacantha difformis Redtenbacher, 1906

Genus of phasmids

Anisacantha is a monotypic genus of phasmids belonging to the family Anisacanthidae. The only species is Anisacantha difformis from Madagascar.
