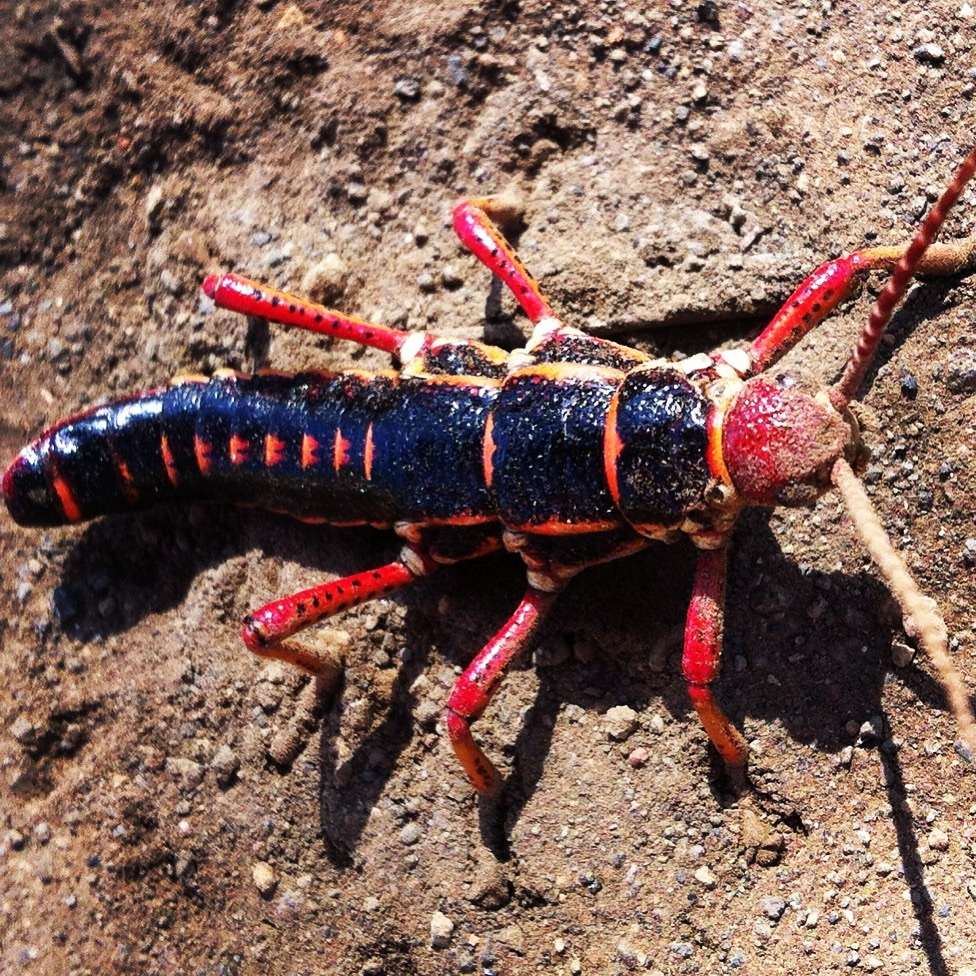

Scientific classification
- Kingdom: Animalia
- Phylum: Arthropoda
- Class: Insecta
- Order: Phasmatodea
- Family: Agathemeridae
- Genus: Agathemera
- Species: A. elegans

Binomial name
- Agathemera elegans (Philippi, 1863)

Synonyms
- Agathemera anthracina Redtenbacher, 1906; Anisomorpha elegans Philippi, 1863; Paradoxomorpha elegans (Philippi, 1863)

= Agathemera elegans =

Species of insect

Agathemera elegans, the elegant chinchemolle, is a species of stick insect within the family Agathemeridae. The species is found in the Andes Mountains in Chile at heights of 1500 meters above sea level. The species is able to secrete a spray in self defense, with the spray being able to cause temporary blindness. The secretion of A. elegans is made up of 4-methyl-1-hepten-3-one.
