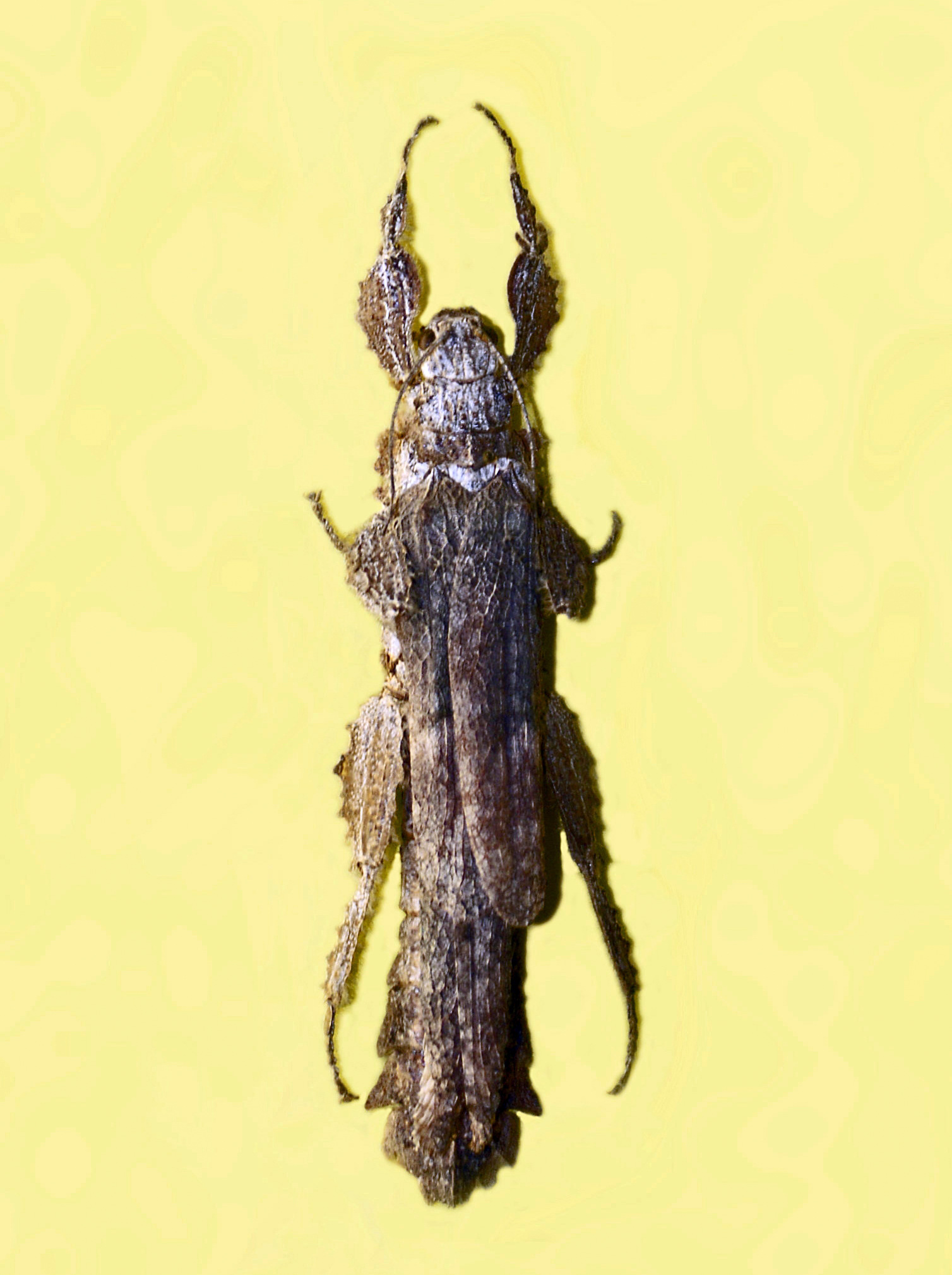
- Prisopus sp.

Scientific classification
- Kingdom: Animalia
- Phylum: Arthropoda
- Clade: Pancrustacea
- Class: Insecta
- Order: Phasmatodea
- Superfamily: Aschiphasmatoidea
- Family: Prisopodidae; Brunner von Wattenwyl, 1893

= Prisopodidae =

Family of stick insects

Prisopodidae is a family of stick insects belonging to the suborder Verophasmatodea and superfamily Aschiphasmatoidea, erected by Carl Brunner von Wattenwyl in 1893. Species can be found in Central and South America.

== Genera ==
The Phasmida Species File lists:

Subfamily Prisopodinae Brunner von Wattenwyl, 1893

1. Damasippus Stål, 1875 (South America)
2. Dinelytron Gray, 1835 (Brazil)
3. Prisopus Peletier de Saint Fargeau & Serville, 1827 (Central & South America)

Note: the subfamily Korinninae Günther, 1953 is now placed as a tribe in the Necrosciinae; Paraprisopus Redtenbacher, 1906 (synonym Melophasma from South America) is now in tribe Paraprisopodini of the Pseudophasmatinae.
