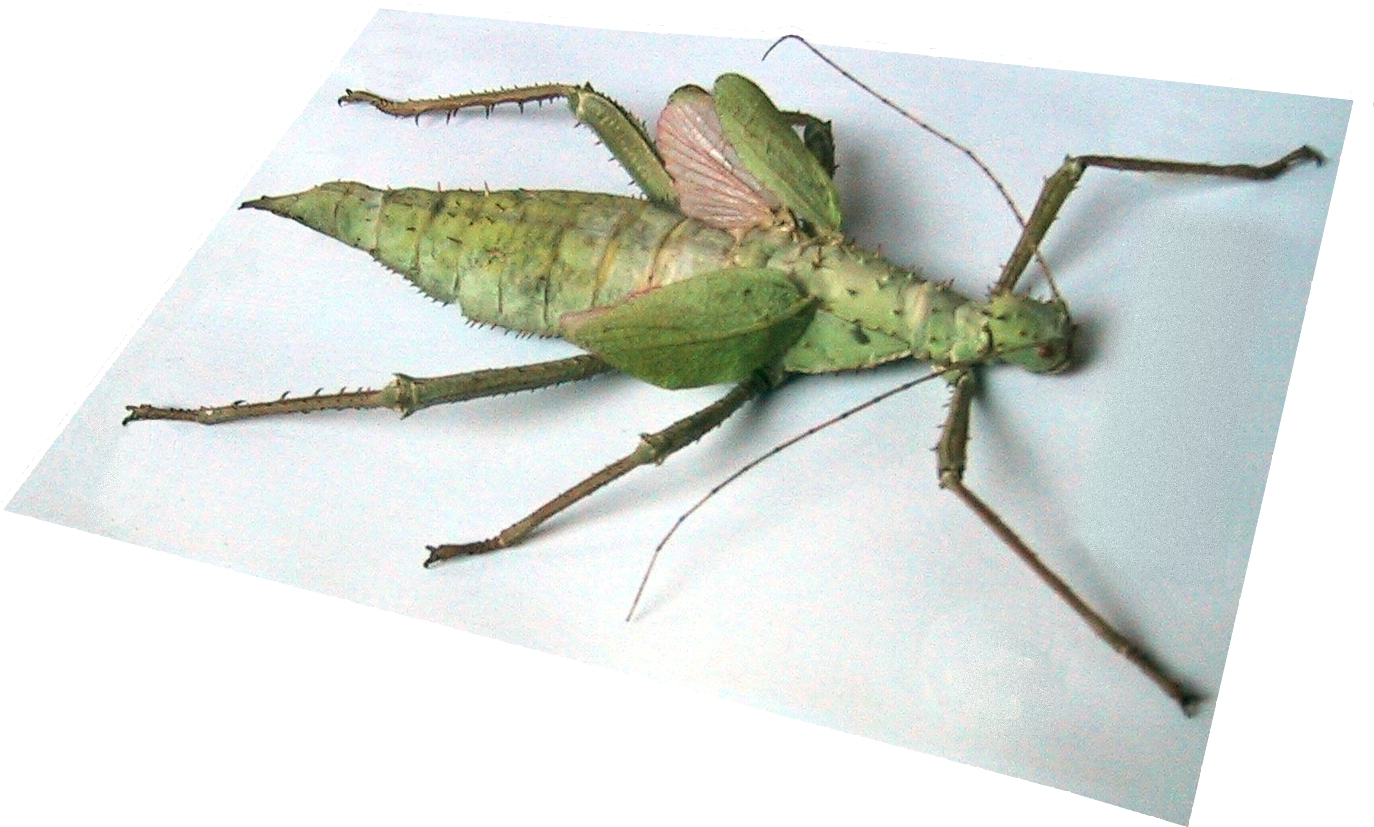
- Heteropteryx dilatata from Malaysia

Scientific classification
- Kingdom: Animalia
- Phylum: Arthropoda
- Class: Insecta
- Subclass: Pterygota
- Infraclass: Neoptera
- Cohort: Polyneoptera
- Order: Phasmatodea
- Suborder: Euphasmatodea; Bradler, 1999

Superfamilies
- Aschiphasmatoidea; Bacilloidea; Phyllioidea; Pseudophasmatoidea; 3 families incertae sedis

Synonyms
- Verophasmatodea Zompro, 2004

= Euphasmatodea =

Euphasmatodea Temporal range: Aptian–Recent

Suborder of insects

The Euphasmatodea, also known by its junior synonym Verophasmatodea is a suborder of the Phasmatodea, which contains the vast majority of the extant species of stick and leaf insects, excluding the Timematodea. The oldest record of Euphasmatodea is Araripephasma from the Crato Formation of Brazil, dating to the Aptian stage of the Early Cretaceous.

== Superfamilies and families ==
The suborder Euphasmatodea was previously divided into two infraorders: the Areolatae and Anareolatae, based on the presence or absence of an "areola": a small ring of colour or gap in wing margin - see the Glossary of entomology terms. This division has now been superseded and the suborder is now divided into four superfamilies: Aschiphasmatoidea, Bacilloidea, Phyllioidea, and Pseudophasmatoidea. The latter includes family Agathemeridae, which was previously placed in suborder Agathemerodea.

=== Aschiphasmatoidea ===
Authority: Brunner von Wattenwyl, 1893

- †Archipseudophasmatidae
- Aschiphasmatidae - Brunner von Wattenwyl, 1893 (Tropical Southeast Asia)
- Damasippoididae - Zompro, 2004 (Madagascar)
- Prisopodidae - Brunner von Wattenwyl, 1893 (Central and South America, South Africa, India, Indo-China, Malesia)

=== Bacilloidea ===
Authority: Brunner von Wattenwyl, 1893

- Anisacanthidae - Günther, 1953 (Madagascar)
- Bacillidae - Brunner von Wattenwyl, 1893 (Africa, Europe)
- Heteropterygidae - Kirby, 1896 (Australasia, east and southeast Asia)

=== Phyllioidea Brunner von Wattenwyl, 1893 ===
- Phylliidae - Brunner von Wattenwyl, 1893 (Australasia, Asia, Pacific)

=== Pseudophasmatoidea ===
Authority: Rehn, 1904

- Agathemeridae - Bradler, 2003 (monotypic; Andean mountain range)
- Heteronemiidae - Rehn, 1904 (South America, Southern North America, Madagascar)
- Pseudophasmatidae - Rehn, 1904 (South America, Southern North America, Maritime Southeast Asia)

=== Incertae sedis; ex. Anareolatae ===
The following three families were previously placed in the "Anareolatae", but are currently (2021) considered incertae sedis.

- Diapheromeridae - Kirby, 1904 - Worldwide distribution (except the Antarctic)
- Lonchodidae - Brunner von Wattenwyl, 1893 - Worldwide, but especially southern Africa, Asia & Australia
- Phasmatidae - Gray, 1835 - Asia, Australasia, Americas (especially South), Pacific, Africa
