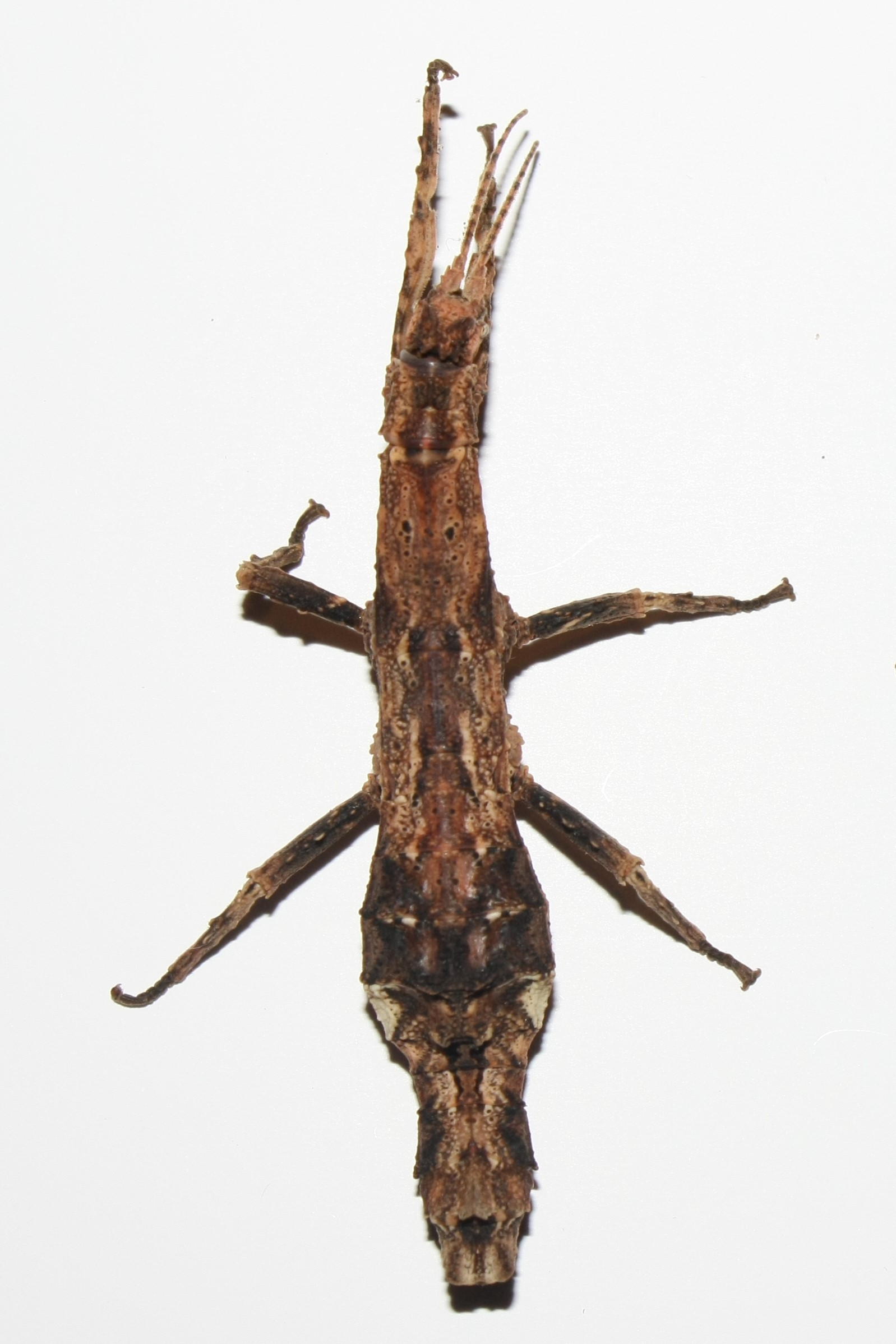
- Orestes shirakii, female

Scientific classification
- Kingdom: Animalia
- Phylum: Arthropoda
- Class: Insecta
- Order: Phasmatodea
- Superfamily: Bacilloidea
- Family: Heteropterygidae
- Subfamily: Dataminae
- Genus: Orestes
- Species: O. shirakii

Binomial name
- Orestes shirakii (Brock & Ho, 2013)

Synonyms
- Pylaemenes shirakii Brock & Ho, 2013

= Orestes shirakii =

Species of stick insect

Orestes shirakii is a species of stick insects native to Taiwan.

== Characteristics ==
Only the females of Orestes shirakii are known so far. These are very slim and can reach a length of 50 millimetres (2.0 in). They can be easily distinguished from Orestes guangxiensis by their size. The elongated mesonotum of Orestes shirakii is three times as long as the pronotum. That of Orestes guangxiensis is only 2.5 times as long as the pronotum. The third to fifth tergite of the abdomen in Orestes shirakii lack the posterior lateral tubercles and the shortened posterior edge of the eighth sternite (subgenital plate). The mesonotum is slightly expanded to the rear, the metanotum is rectangular. In the similar Orestes japonicus the mesonotum is parallel and the metanotum is square.

== Distribution area and reproduction ==
Large parts of Taiwan are named as the range of the species, where it occurs at altitudes below 1,000 metres (3,300 ft).

The females begin to lay one to three eggs a week in or on moist soil about six weeks after molting to imago. These take four to six months to hatch. The newly hatched nymphs only begin to eat after about two weeks and take up to 15 months until they are adult. When touched, both adults and nymphs play dead.

== Taxonomy ==
- - Orestes shirakii 'Taiwan'
  - - Orestes sp. 'Tây Yên Tử'
    - - Orestes japonicus 'Okinawa'
      - Orestes dittmari

Relationships between Orestes shirakii and its sister species or stocks according to Sarah Bank et al. (2021)

George Ho Wai-Chun and Paul D. Brock described the species under the basionym Pylaemenes shirakii based on one by Ho on October 2, 2009, in Taipei found adult female. This is deposited as holotype in the collection of the Hong Kong Entomological Society. The species name is dedicated to the Taiwanese entomologist Tokuichi Shiraki. As part of the description of six new species from Vietnam, Joachim Bresseel and Jérôme Constant transferred the species in 2018 into the genus Orestes. As early as 1935, Shiraki had collected specimens of the species in Taiwan wrongly identified as Datames mouhotii (today's valid name Orestes mouhotii). The publications by Hua 2000, Huang 2002 and Xu 2005 about Orestes mouhotii from Taiwan refer to Orestes shirakii. The situation is different with the specimens described from the Japanese Ryūkyū Islands. These were also assigned to Datames mouhotii by Masaya Okada (1999) and Brock (1999), by Brock & Okada (2005) as well as by Ichikawa (2015) as Pylaemenes guangxiensis (today valid name Orestes guangxiensis) and by Ho (2013) and Frank H. Hennemann et al (2016) referred to as Orestes shirakii, but belong to the closely related Orestes japonicus described by Ho in 2016.

As genetic analysis by Sarah Bank et al show, Orestes shirakii forms together with Orestes japonicus and two Vietnamese species a common clade within the monophyletic genus Orestes. The Vietnamese species are Orestes dittmari and a still undescribed species from the Tay Yen Tu nature reserve.

== Terraristic ==
The first and so far only parthenogenetic breeding stock in terrariums goes back to eggs that Bruno Kneubühler received from northern Taiwan in 2009 and whose offspring he distributed in 2010 as Pylaemenes guangxiensis 'Taiwan'. Sometimes the stock is still incorrectly called Orestes guangxiensis 'Taiwan'.

Orestes shirakii prefers a higher humidity, which can be achieved by a layer of soil covered with moist moss. Leaves of bramble or other Rosaceae are eaten, as well as cherry laurel, Gaultheria shallon (salal), hazel, oak, beech or Epipremnum species and other Araceae.
