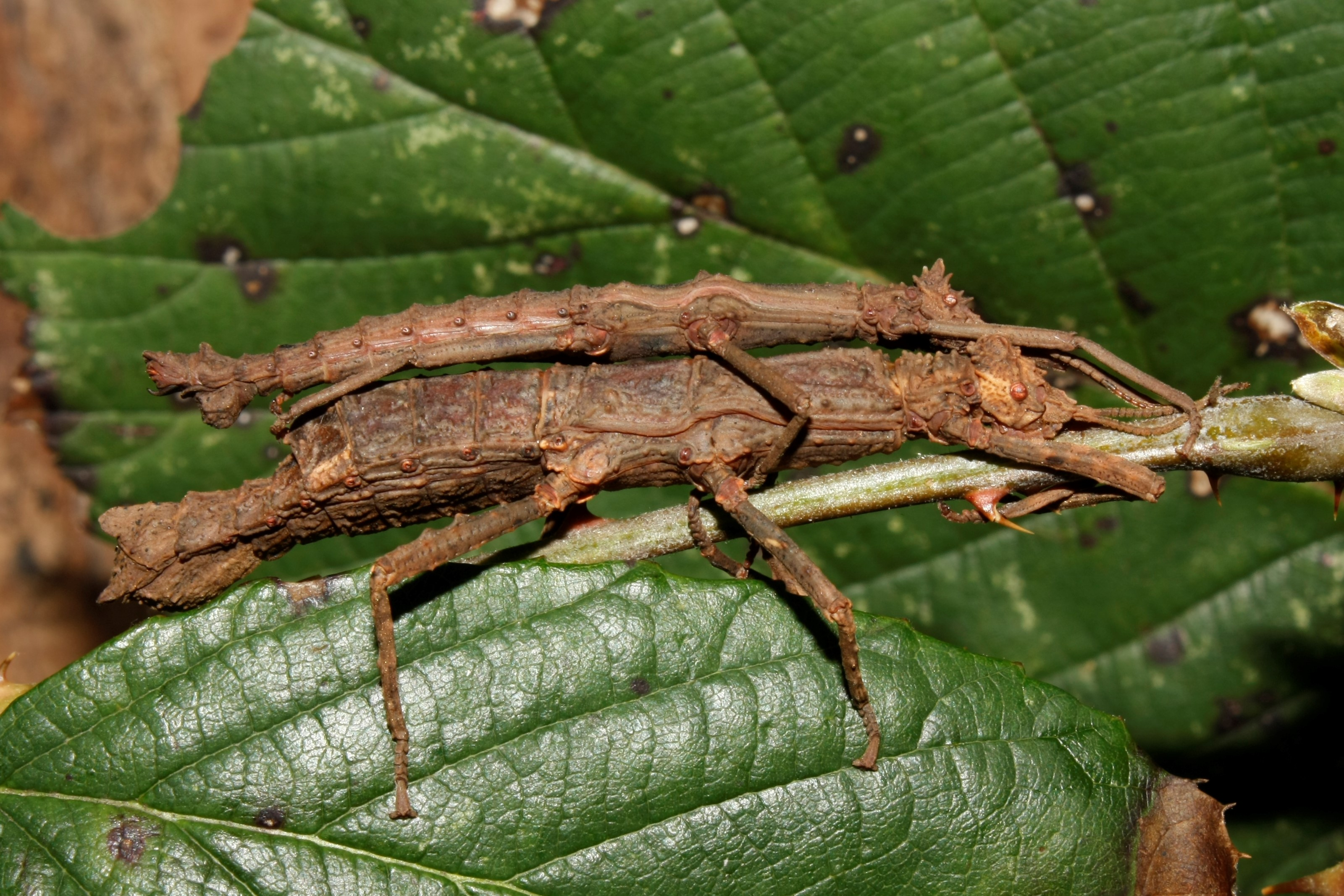
- Orestes japonicus, pair

Scientific classification
- Kingdom: Animalia
- Phylum: Arthropoda
- Class: Insecta
- Order: Phasmatodea
- Superfamily: Bacilloidea
- Family: Heteropterygidae
- Subfamily: Dataminae
- Genus: Orestes
- Species: O. japonicus

Binomial name
- Orestes japonicus (Ho, 2016)

Synonyms
- Pylaemenes japonicus Ho, 2016

= Orestes japonicus =

Species of stick insect

Orestes japonicus, a stick insect, is a representative of the genus Orestes.

== Characteristics ==
Orestes japonicus is an elongated and strong Orestes species. Males are 38 to 40 millimetres (1.5 to 1.6 in) long. They are almost monochrome, medium to dark brown in color, and when they are freshly adult, they show small dark spots at the base of the abdomen and a larger pair of spots on the metanotum that look like wing stubs. In front of and behind the eyes there are paired, blunt spines. On the tip of the forehead sit two distinct elevations that almost touch each other at the back and move away from each other towards the front. At the rear edge of the mesonotum there is a pair of particularly large tubercles. The abdomen is round in cross section. At the rear edge of the eighth abdominal segment there is a centrally located elevation.

Females grow to 44 to 49 millimetres (1.7 to 1.9 in) long and show when fresh adult or as older nymphs the pattern of black spots on vividly combined beige and brown tones, which is also typical for other females of the genus. Their mesonotum is parallel-sided, the metanotum is square. In this it differs from the females of the closely related Orestes shirakii, whose mesonotum is slightly widened to the rear, while the metanotum is rectangular.

The markings of both sexes fade with increasing age and the animals then become increasingly uniformly brown. Under certain conditions, the nymphs can be conspicuously red-brown in color.

== Distribution area ==
Orestes japonicus can be found on the Japanese Ryūkyū Islands. There the species is in Kagoshima Prefecture on Amami-Ōshima, Yakushima and Yoronjima and in Okinawa Prefecture on Miyako-jima, Irabu-jima, Ishigaki-jima, Iriomote, Yonaguni and Okinawa Hontō of the main island of the Okinawa Islands.

== Taxonomy ==
- - Orestes shirakii 'Taiwan'
  - - Orestes sp. 'Tây Yên Tử'
    - - Orestes japonicus 'Okinawa'
      - Orestes dittmari

Relationships between Orestes japonicus and its sister species or stocks according to Sarah Bank et al. (2021)

George Ho Wai-Chun described the species in 2016 under the basionym Pylaemenes japonicus on the basis of collection specimens he examined. The species name refers to their distribution area. As holotype he chose a female that had already been collected on May 8, 1982, by Masaya Okada on Yakushima, which is deposited in the Osaka Museum of Natural History. Various specimens collected between 1979 and 2012 were declared to paratypes and are in the collections of the Osaka Museum of Natural History, the Hong Kong Entomological Society and the private collection of Okada in Nagoya. As early as 1935, Tokuichi Shiraki had examined specimens from the Japanese Empire, which he called Datames mouhotii (today's name Orestes mouhotii). Ho and Paul D. Brock placed these in 2013 in a species they described as Pylaemenes shirakii (today's name: Orestes shirakii). Ho further differentiated these specimens in 2016 and only counts Shiraki's animals from Taiwan as Pylaemenes shirakii, while in 2016 he lists the specimens from the Ryūkyū Islands as Pylaemenes japonicus. Also those by Okada (1999) and those by Brock (1999) referred to as Datames mouhotii and those by Brock & Okada (2005) as well as by Ichikawa (2015) named as Pylaemenes guangxiensis (today valid name Orestes guangxiensis), as well as Orestes shirakii named by Ho himself 2013 and Frank H. Hennemann et al (2016) belong to Pylaemenes japonicus according Ho (2016).

As part of the description of six new Orestes species from Vietnam, Joachim Bresseel and Jérôme Constant placed the species 2018 in the genus Orestes.

As genetic analysis by Sarah Bank et al show, Orestes japonicus forms together with Orestes shirakii and two Vietnamese species a common clade within the monophyletic genus Orestes. The Vietnamese species are Orestes dittmari, the direct sister species of Orestes japonicus and an as yet undescribed species from Tây Yên Tử Nature Reserve in Sơn Động District.

== Terraristic ==
The first, and so far only, stock widespread in terrariums has been a sexually reproducing line, in breeding in Europe since 2013. It was initially referred to as Pylaemenes guangxiensis 'Okinawa'. Kazuhisa Kuribayashi collected the original specimens around 2010 on Okinawa. He named the specimens thus, following Brock and Okada (2005). The stock was later identified as Orestes japonicus by Bresseel and Constant in 2018.

Orestes japonicus is easy to keep and to breed. A high humidity is preferred, which can be achieved by a layer of soil. Leaves of bramble or other Rosaceae are eaten, as well as Gaultheria shallon (salal), hazel, oak, beech, as well as from Epipremnum and other Araceae.

== Gallery ==
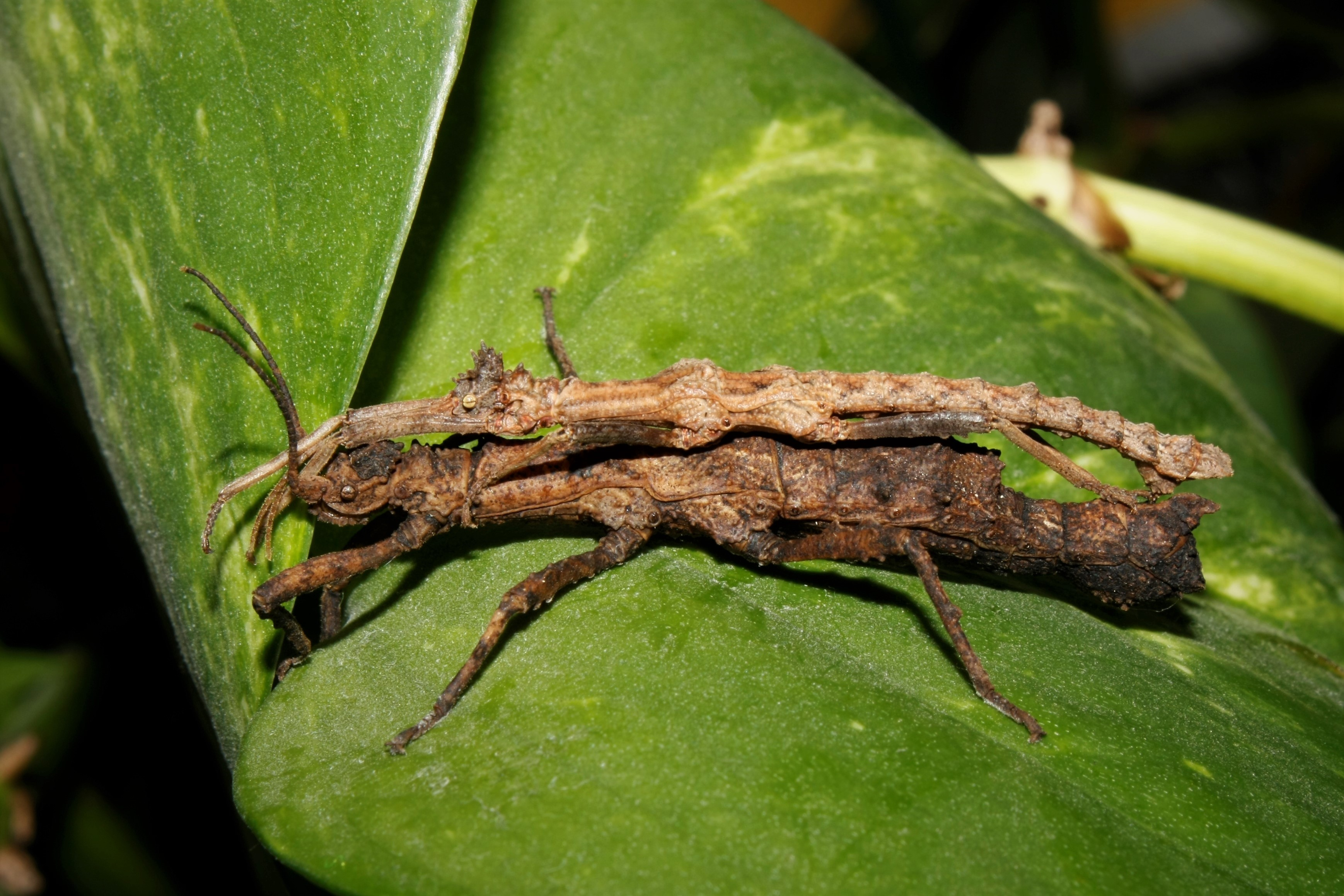
Pair of Okinawa stock

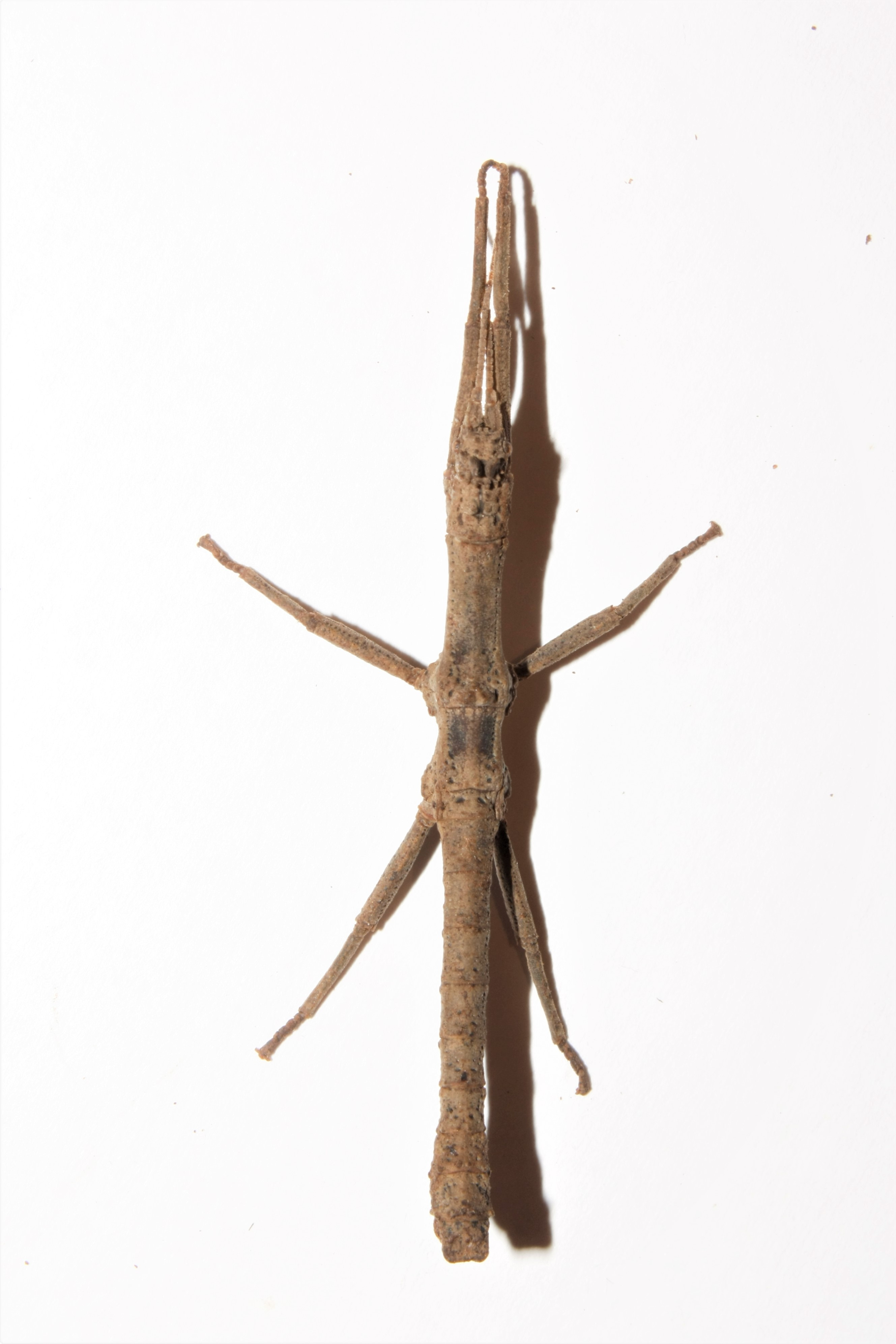
Male of Okinawa stock – dorsally

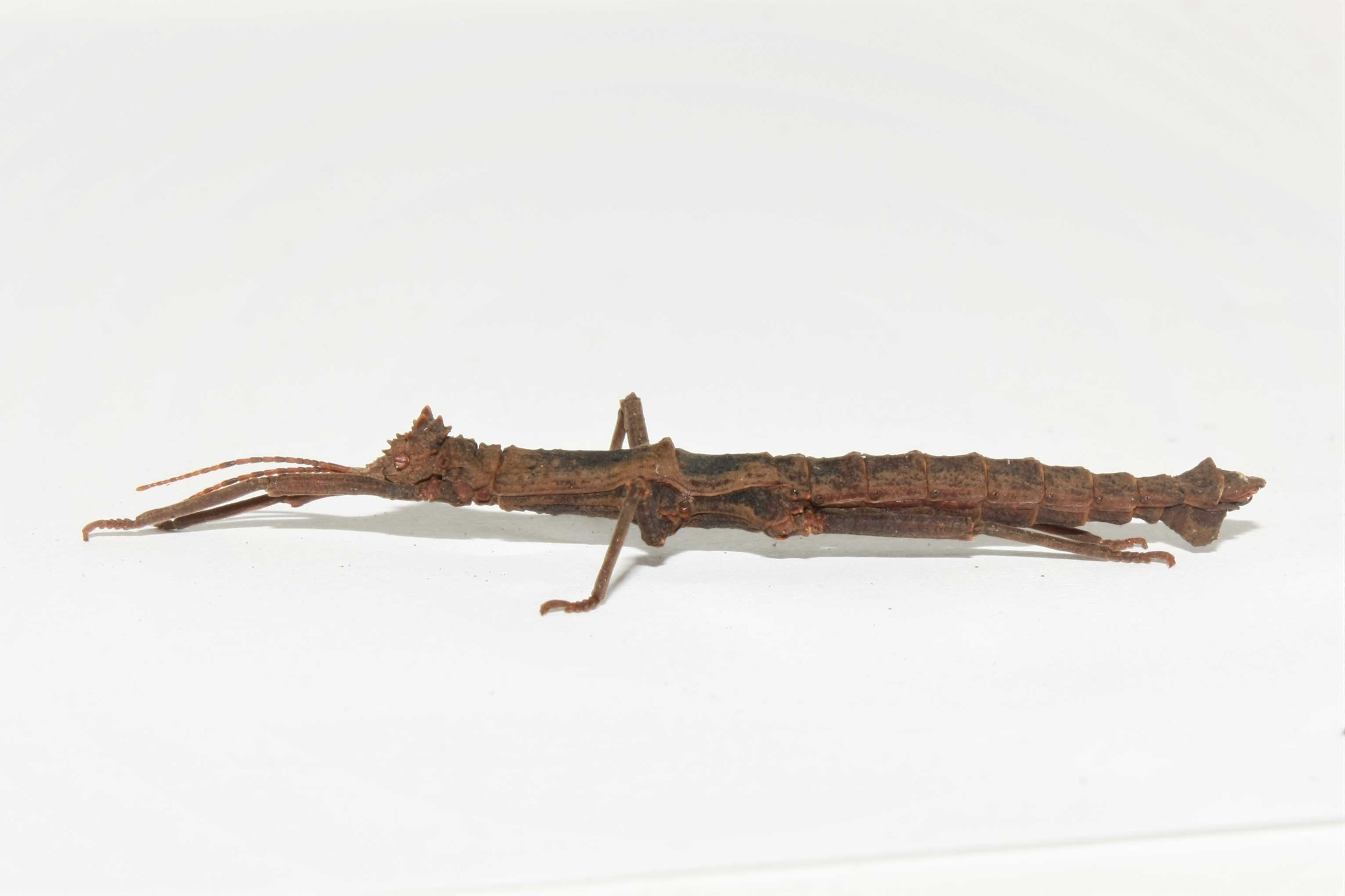
Male of Okinawa stock – laterally

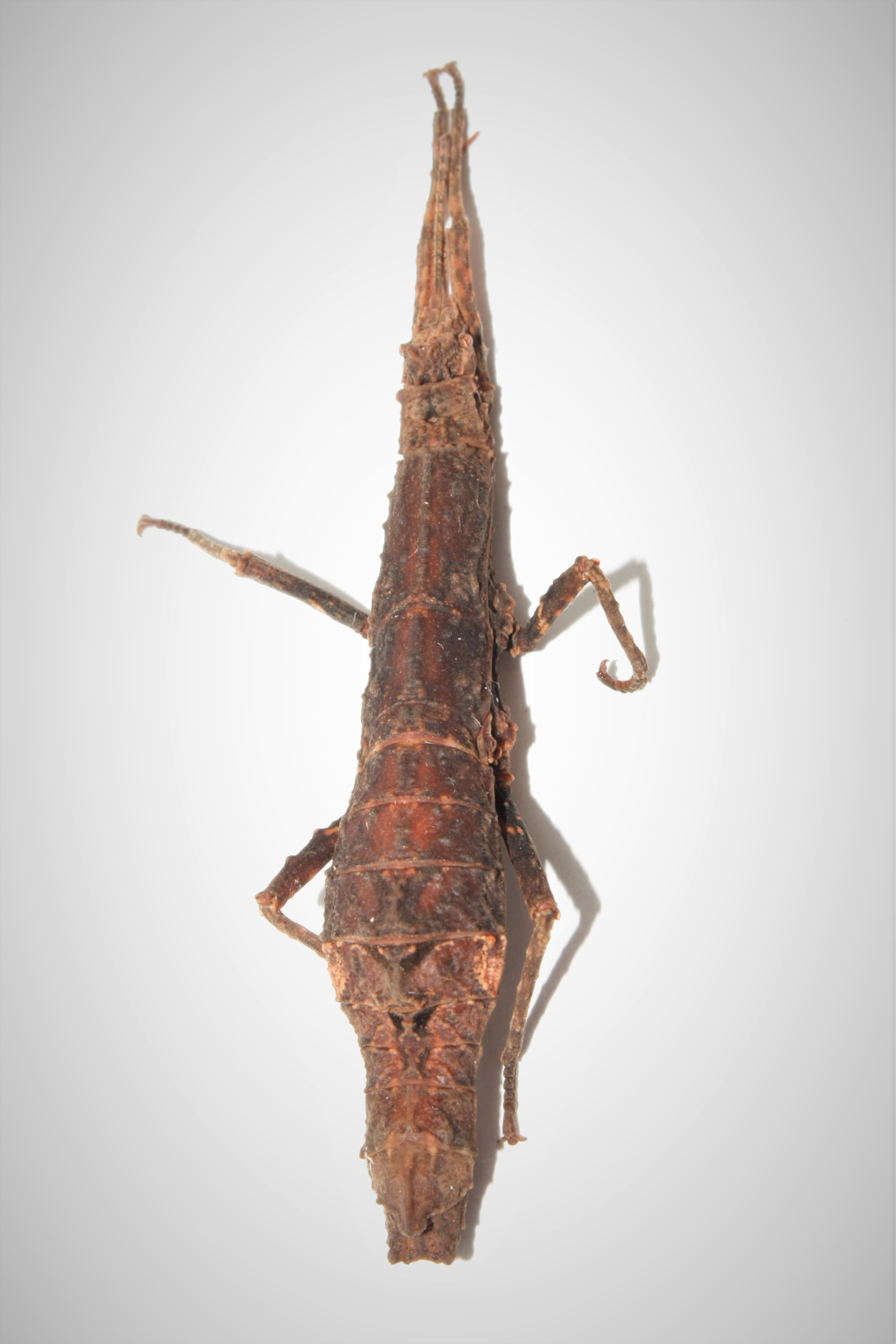
Female of Okinawa stock – dorsally

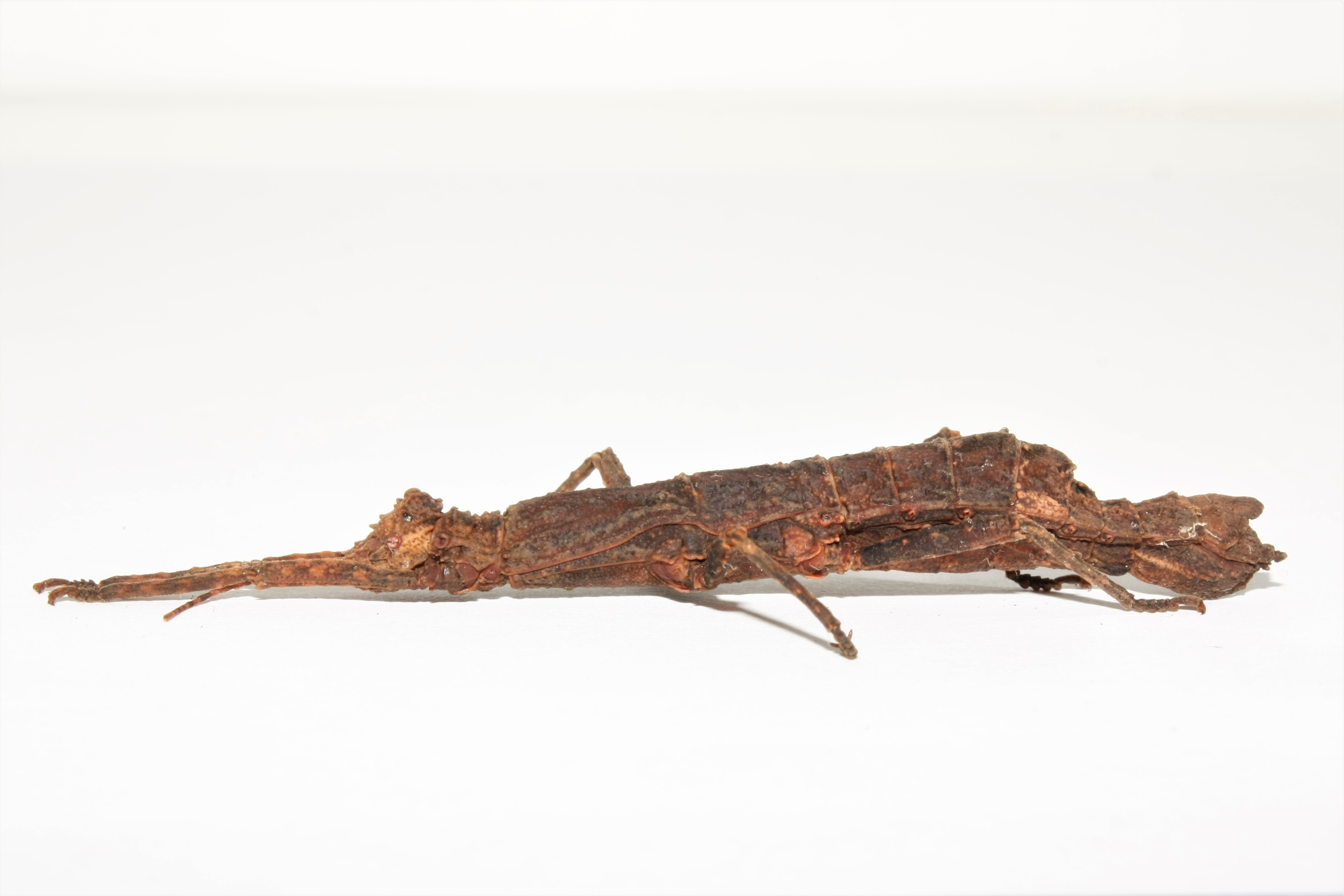
Female of Okinawa stock – laterally
