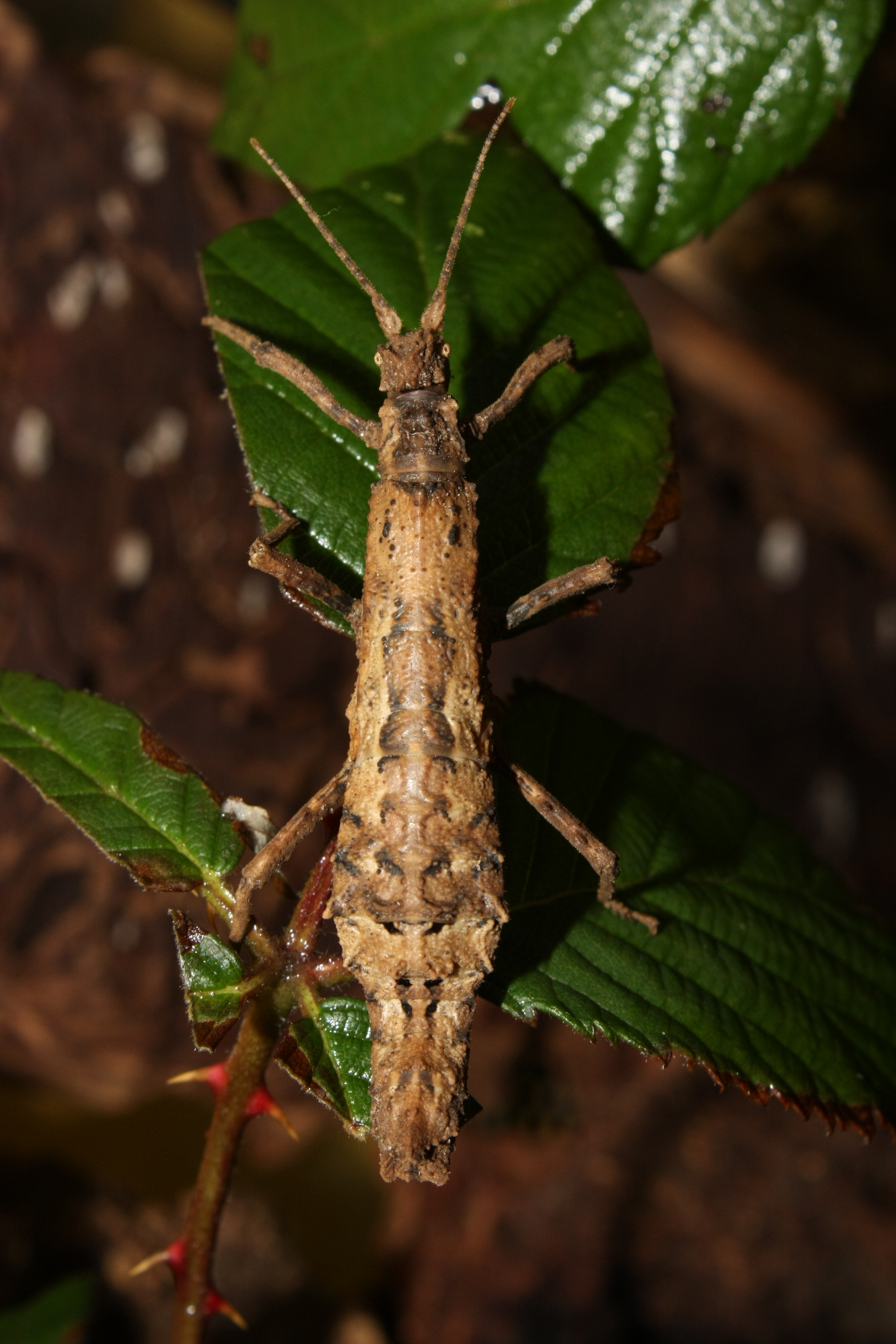
- Orestes guangxiensis, adult female

Scientific classification
- Kingdom: Animalia
- Phylum: Arthropoda
- Clade: Pancrustacea
- Class: Insecta
- Order: Phasmatodea
- Superfamily: Bacilloidea
- Family: Heteropterygidae
- Subfamily: Dataminae
- Genus: Orestes
- Species: O. guangxiensis

Binomial name
- Orestes guangxiensis (Bi & Li, 1994)

Synonyms
- Datames guangxiensis (Bi & Li, 1994); Pylaemenes guangxiensis ((Bi & Li, 1994); Pylaemenes hongkongensis Brock & Seow-Choen, 2000

= Orestes guangxiensis =

Species of stick insect

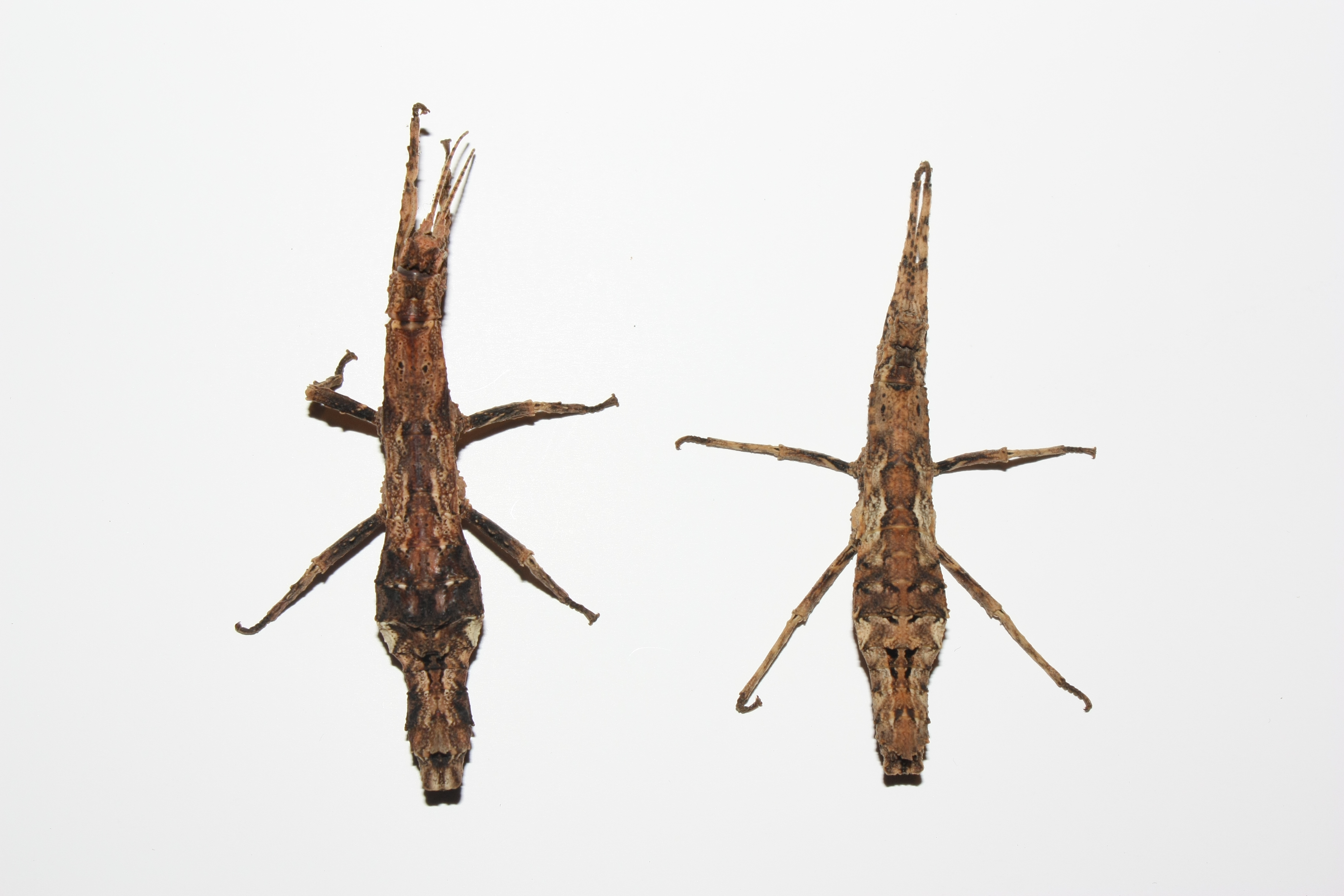
Left female of Orestes shirakii from Taiwan, right Orestes guangxiensis

Orestes guangxiensis is a representative of the genus Orestes.

== Characteristics ==
So far only females are known of Orestes guangxiensis. In 2005 Paul D. Brock and Masaya Okada mistakenly described males of this species from Japanese island Miyako-jima. George Ho Wai-Chun assigned this to Pylaemenes japonicus described by him in 2016 (today's name Orestes japonicus).

The females are 40 to 50 millimetres (1.6 to 2.0 in) long and stocky in shape. Their basic color is usually a light beige or brown, which is complemented by almost white, brown and black patterns. The body surface is covered with small, mostly black tubercles. In the middle of the otherwise flat upper side of the thorax a weak carina can be seen. The comparatively short mesonotum is 2.5 times as long as the pronotum and thus significantly shorter than in longer species such as Orestes mouhotii or Orestes shirakii. On the forehead that becomes narrower towards the top, the four elevations form two edges that converge towards the tip of the forehead, which when viewed from the front form a triangle. The abdomen becomes significantly wider up to the middle and is also strongly raised laterally up to the middle in egg-laying females. Tubercles can be found on the posterior lateral area of the third to fifth tergite of the abdomen other species is missing in the females of Orestes guangxiensis.

== Distribution area ==
The distribution area extends over the Chinese provinces Fujian, Guangdong, Hainan and the autonomous region Guangxi, as well as the Special administrative regions of China Hong Kong. The animals found in Taiwan are now included in Orestes shirakii. The population, of which males are mostly known, were identified as Orestes japonicus.

== Way of life and reproduction ==
The nocturnal insects, like all members of the genus, are able to achieve an almost perfect phytomimesis by aligning legs and antennae along the body and so hardly from a short broken branch are to be distinguished. Orestes guangxiensis is capable of parthenogenesis. So far, only females have been found at many sites. About six weeks after the moult to imago the females begin to lay one to three eggs per week. These have a length and width of about 3 millimetres (0.12 in) and a height of almost 2 millimetres (0.079 in). They are more curved on the dorsal side and have short hairs ending with barbs. The micropylar plate has three arms, one of which points towards the lid, while the other two run circularly around the egg. The eggs are laid on the ground or near the ground. Eggs are often clamped in bark or pinned to mosses. After an average of four months, the nymphs hatch, which have clear carinae along the middle and edges of the body and already have the high and pointed forehead typical of the species which also do not have a flat head in adulthood. It takes a good year for them to grow into adults. Older nymphs are often more contrasting and colorful than adult females. They are often red-brown tones.

== Taxonomy ==
- - Orestes subcylindricus
  - - Orestes guangxiensis
    - - Orestes sp. 1 'Ba Be'
      - Orestes bachmaensis

Relationships between Orestes guangxiensis and its sister species or stocks according to Sarah Bank et al. (2021)

Li Tianshan collected seven specimens of this species in the Chinese region of in 1991. In 1994 D. Bi and T. Li described the species as Datames guangxiensis on the basis of these animals. The species name refers to the place where it was found. A female was deposited at the Entomological Institute of the Chinese Academy of Sciences in Shanghai as holotype. In 1998 Frank H. Hennemann introduced the genus Datames as synonym to the genus Pylaemenes. As a result, Datames guangxiensis was assigned to the genus Pylaemenes. Paul D. Brock and Francis Seow-Choen described Pylaemenes hongkongensis from Hong Kong in 2000, which a little later turned out to be synonymous with Pylaemenes guangxiensis. Their female holotype is deposited in the Natural History Museum in London. Oliver Zompro placed the species in the genus Dares in 2004 and Dares ziegleri (valid name Orestes ziegleri) described by him and Ingo Fritzsche in 1999 as a synonym for the species he referred to as Dares guangxiensis. Brock and Okada transferred the species back to the genus Pylaemenes in 2006 and described their males from the Ryūkyū Islands. These were later assigned to Orestes japonicus. They also proved that Pylaemenes guangxiensis is not identical to Dares ziegleri, which was again validated. As part of the description of six new species from Vietnam, Joachim Bresseel and Jérôme Constant finally placed the species in the genus Orestes.

How genetic analysis of Sarah Bank et al show forms Orestes guangxiensi together with the Vietnamese species Orestes subcylindricus, Orestes bachmaensis and a still undescribed species from the Ba Bể National Park a common clade within the monophyletic genus Orestes.

== Terraristic ==
The first and so far only parthenogenetic stock in European terrariums goes back to females that were collected by Seow-Choen and Brock in Hong Kong in 1996 and which they named in 2000 as Pylaemenes hongkongensis. Another parthenogenetic breeding stock, which was introduced from the north of Taiwan in 2008, was initially referred to as Pylaemenes guangxiensis 'Taiwan'. These stock belongs to Orestes shirakii, described in 2013 as Pylaemenes shirakii and transferred to the genus Orestes in 2018. Since 2013 a stock line from Japan which reproduces sexually has been in breeding in Europe. It was initially called Pylaemenes guangxiensis 'Okinawa', having been collected on Okinawa by Kazuhisa Kuribayashi who named it that, following Brock and Okada (2005). These animals were identified by Breseell and Constant in 2018 as Orestes japonicus described in 2016 under the basionym Pylaemenes japonicus.

Orestes guangxiensis is easy to keep and breed. A high humidity is preferred, which can be achieved by a layer of soil. Leaves of bramble or other Rosaceae are eaten, as well as hazel, oak, beech, as well as from Epipremnum and other Araceae.

Orestes guangxiensis is listed by the Phasmid Study Group under PSG number 248.

== Gallery ==
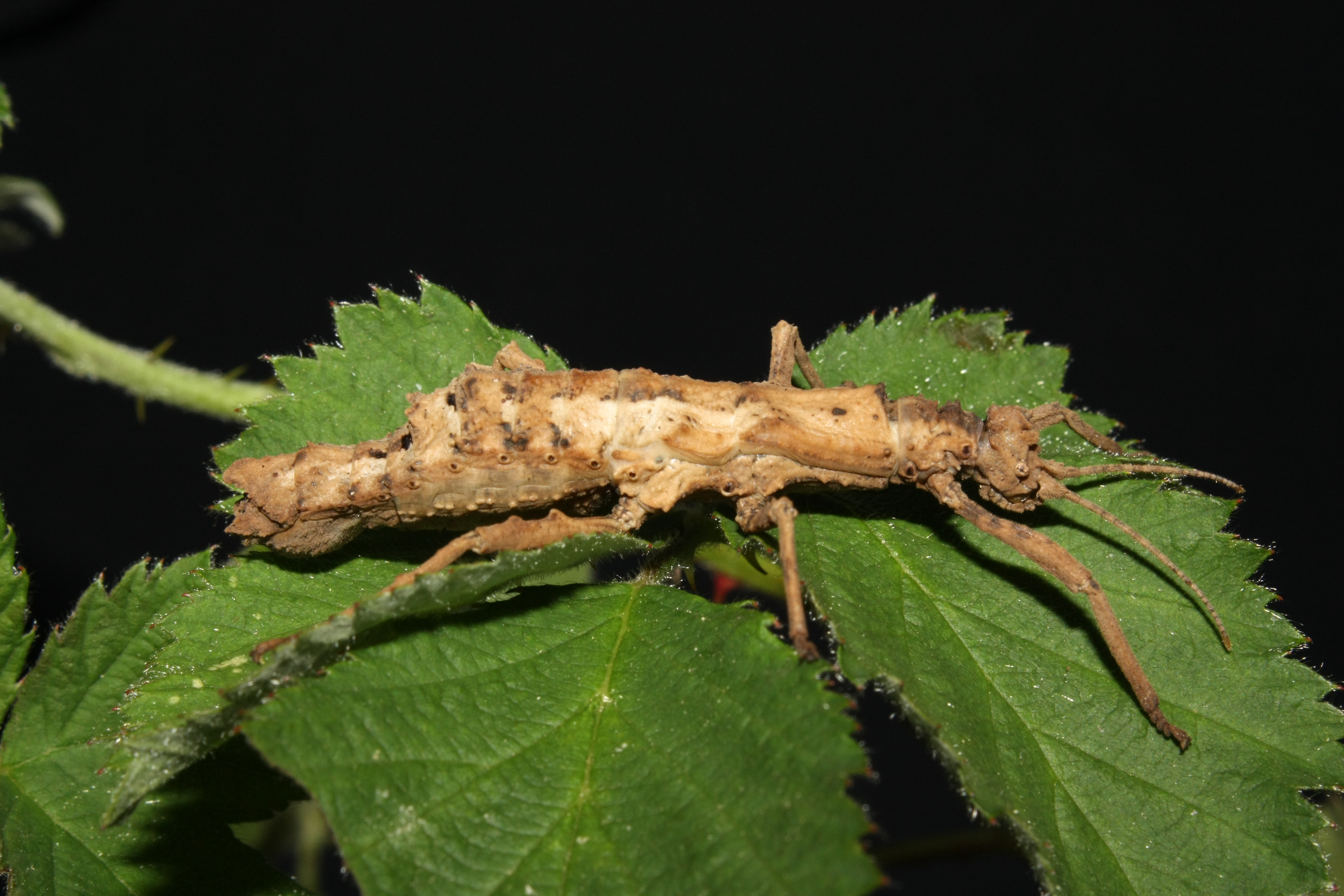
adult female

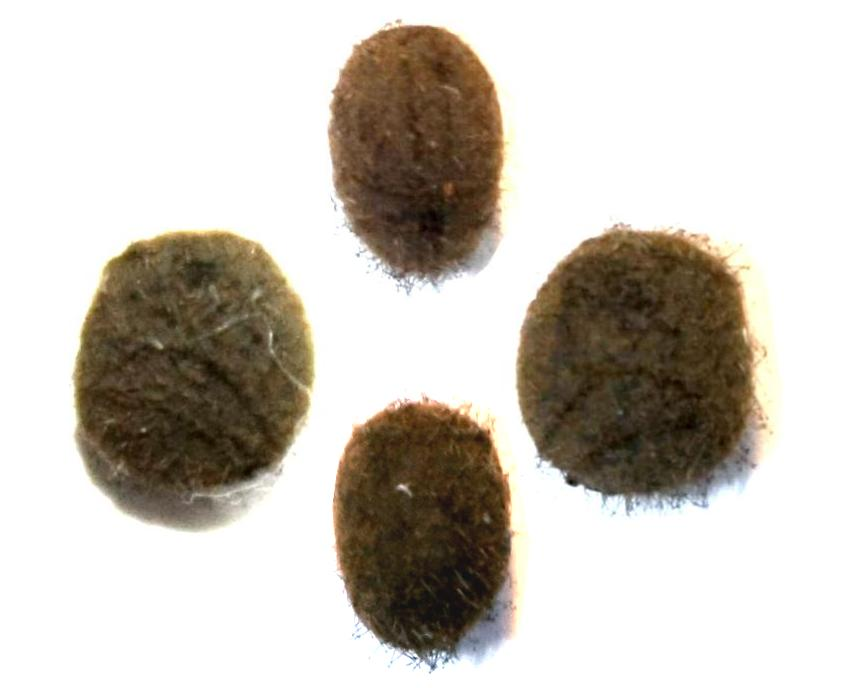
Eggs dorsal, 2 × lateral and ventral view

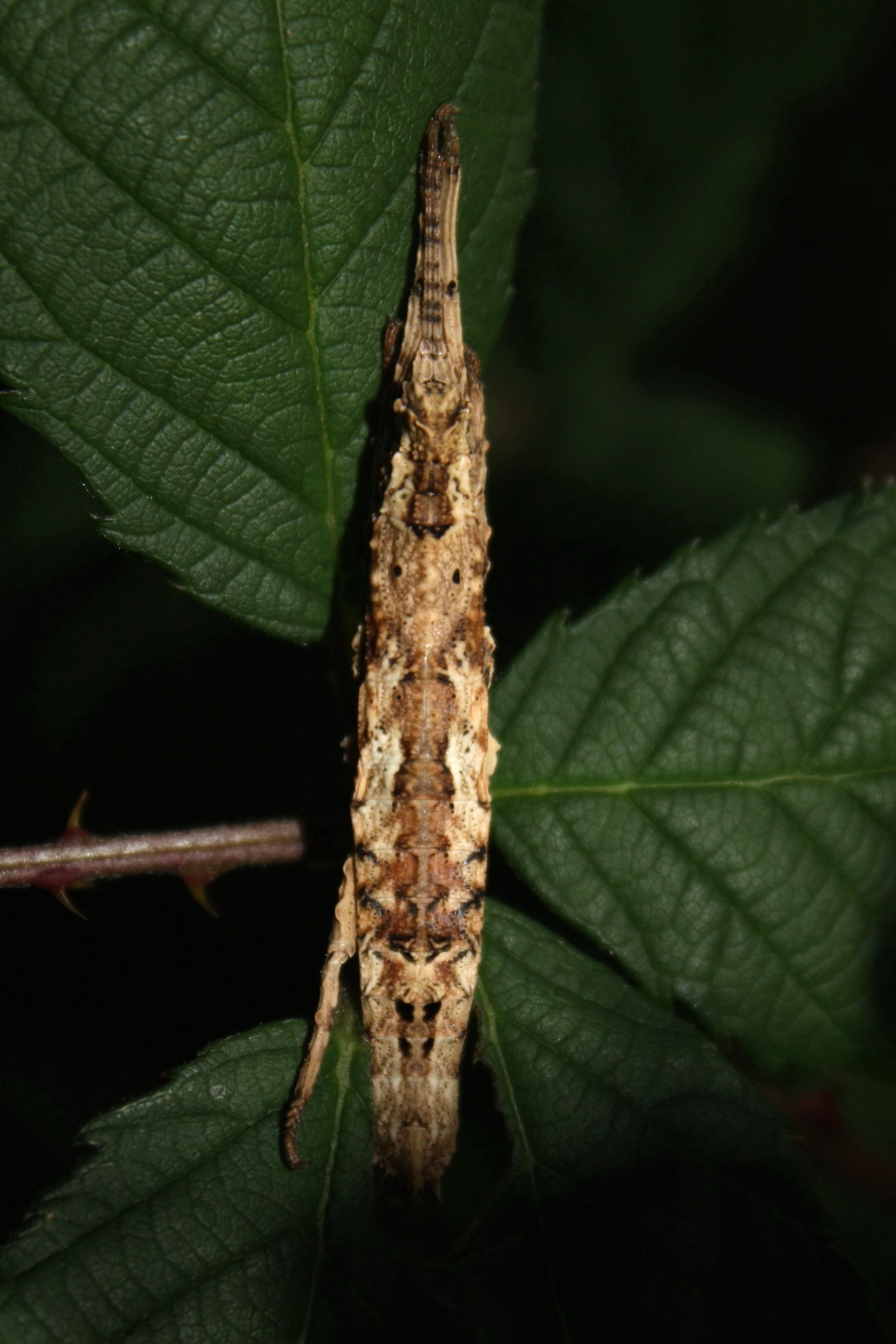
subadult female

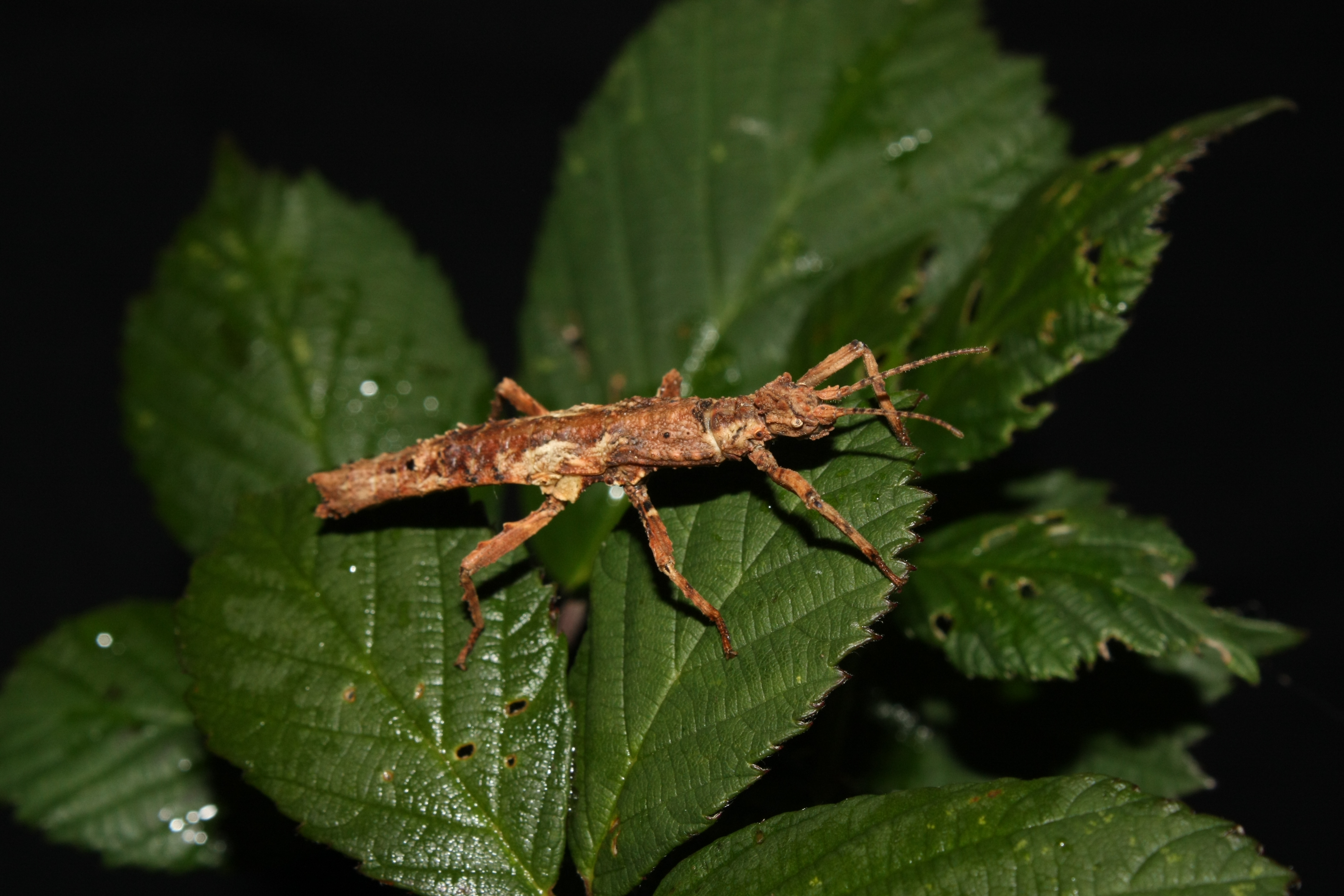
brightly colored female nymph
