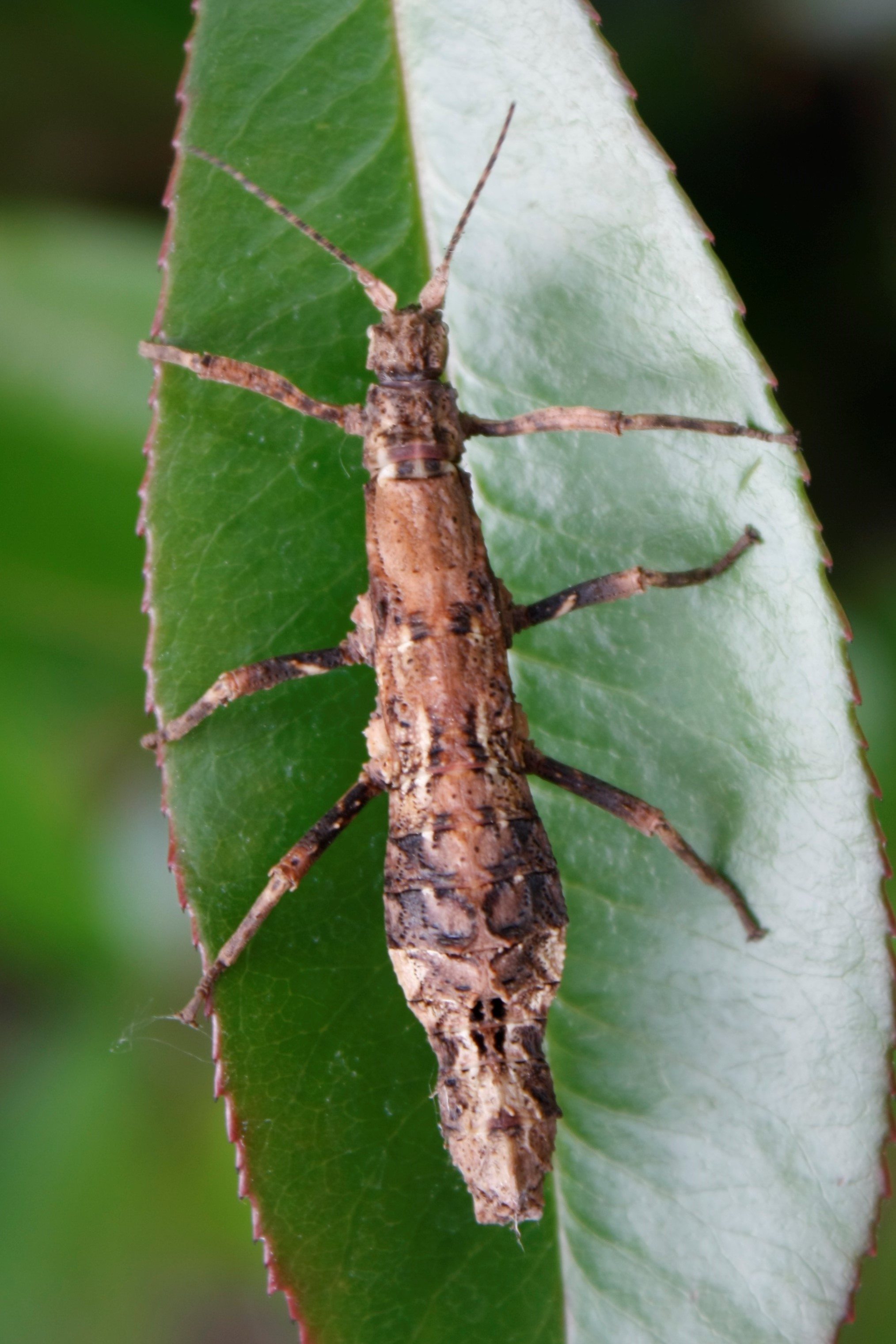
- Orestes dittmari, adult female

Scientific classification
- Kingdom: Animalia
- Phylum: Arthropoda
- Class: Insecta
- Order: Phasmatodea
- Superfamily: Bacilloidea
- Family: Heteropterygidae
- Subfamily: Dataminae
- Genus: Orestes
- Species: O. dittmari

Binomial name
- Orestes dittmari Bresseel & Constant, 2018

= Orestes dittmari =

Species of stick insect

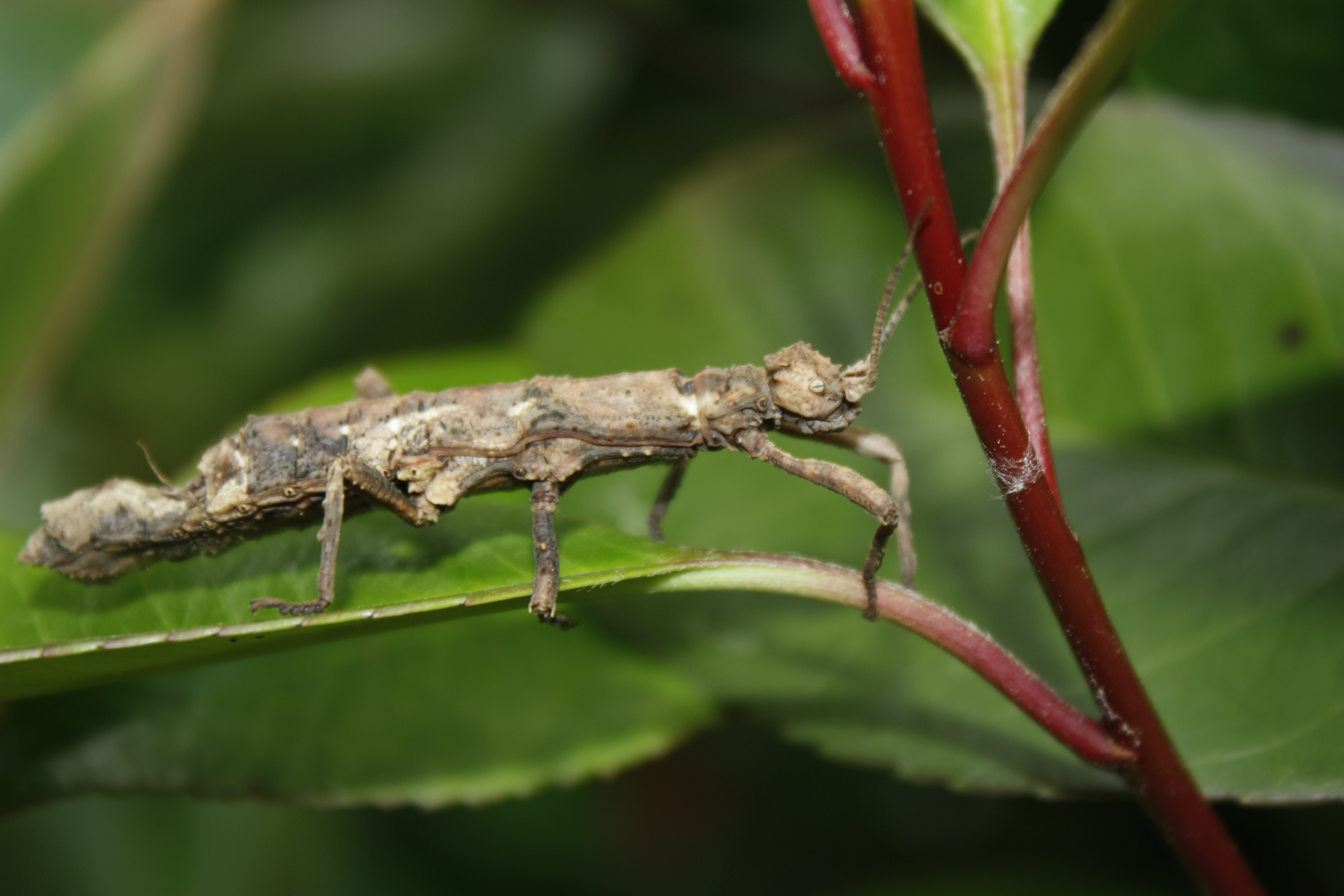
Freshly adult female of Orestes dittmari from Cát Bà

Orestes dittmari is a species of stick insects in the subfamily Dataminae (tribe Datamini).

== Characteristics ==
Males are approximately 4.3 centimetres (1.7 in) long. Like most members of the genus, they are almost monochrome, medium to dark brown in color and show a pair of elongated, dark spots on the metanotum. In front of and behind the eyes there are usually paired, clear spines that show a species-specific expression (see also Acanthotaxy of Heteropterygidae). The three pairs of occipital spines are designed as follows. The anterior supra-anantals are clearly defined as spines and are directed slightly outwards. The two pairs of anterior and posterior supraoccipital behind it are smaller, with the posterior pair being the smallest. The pair of spines behind the eyes of the supraorbital is about as long as the supra-anantal. Their spines are strongly conical and pointed. The spines of the anterior coronal located behind are strongly flattened on the sides and rounded to the tip. The central spine behind it (central coronale) is conical and slightly longer than the pair of spines behind it of the posterior coronals. This and the pair of lateral coronals to the side are designed as small conical tubercles. Behind the eye, a clear edge (postocular carina) extends backwards, where it leads to a conical tubercle. The eyes are relatively small, circular and protruding strongly hemispherical. The antennae are shorter than the fore legs and consist of 23 segments. In addition to the structures on the head, a clear expansion of the mesonotum to the rear is typical of the species.

Females are around 5 centimetres (2.0 in) long and stocky in shape. Their coloring is dominated by shades of brown. It is complemented by patterns of almost white, dark brown and black spots. These lose more and more contrast with increasing age, until the animals are almost monotonous brown. There is a low crest on the head. The supra anantals are short, conical and blunt. The anterior supraoccipital are formed as small conical humps, the posterior supraoccipital are smaller and granulate. The supraorbitals are short, compressed at the sides and rounded to the tip. They are fused with the anterior coronals, which are laterally compressed and lamellar. The centrale coronale is only present as an indistinct little granule. The posterior and lateral coronals are conical tubercles. The postocular carina is clearly formed and its tip is recognizable as a triangular tubercle. The eyes, like those of the males, are relatively small, circular and protruding hemispherically. The antennae, made up of 25 segments, are longer than the fore legs. There are small tubercles on the body surface. The abdomen is clearly expanded laterally.

== Distribution and way of life ==
The species is only known from the Vietnamese Cát Bà National Park.

The nocturnal animals, like all members of the genus, are able to achieve an almost perfect phytomimesis by aligning legs and antennae along the body and so hardly from a short broken branch are to be distinguished. The individually laid brown eggs are 3.5 millimetres (0.14 in) long, 2.9 millimetres (0.11 in) wide, 3.2 millimetres (0.13 in) high and have 0.3 millimetres (0.012 in) long hairs on the egg capsule and lid.

== Taxonomy ==
- - Orestes shirakii 'Taiwan'
  - - Orestes sp. 'Tây Yên Tử'
    - - Orestes japonicus 'Okinawa'
      - Orestes dittmari

Relationships between Orestes dittmari and its sister species or stocks according to Sarah Bank et al. (2021)

Joachim Bresseel and Jérôme Constant found a female on July 7, 2013 and a male of this species on July 13, 2013 in the bay of Hạ Long in the Cát Bà National Park. In their work on the genus Orestes, published in 2018, they described this species as well as five others. The species name is dedicated to Daniel Dittmar, a German phasmid breeder from Berlin who, among others, in particular species and stocks keeps and breeds which Bresseel and Constant brought from Southeast Asia. The male was deposited as holotype, the female and two eggs as paratypes in the Museum of Natural Sciences in Brussels.

As genetic analysis by Sarah Bank et al show, Orestes dittmari forms together with Orestes japonicus, Orestes shirakii and a still undescribed species from the 'Tây Yên Tử' nature reserve a clade within the monophyletic genus Orestes. As the sister species of Orestes dittmari, Orestes japonicus from Okinawa Islands has been identified.

== Terraristic ==
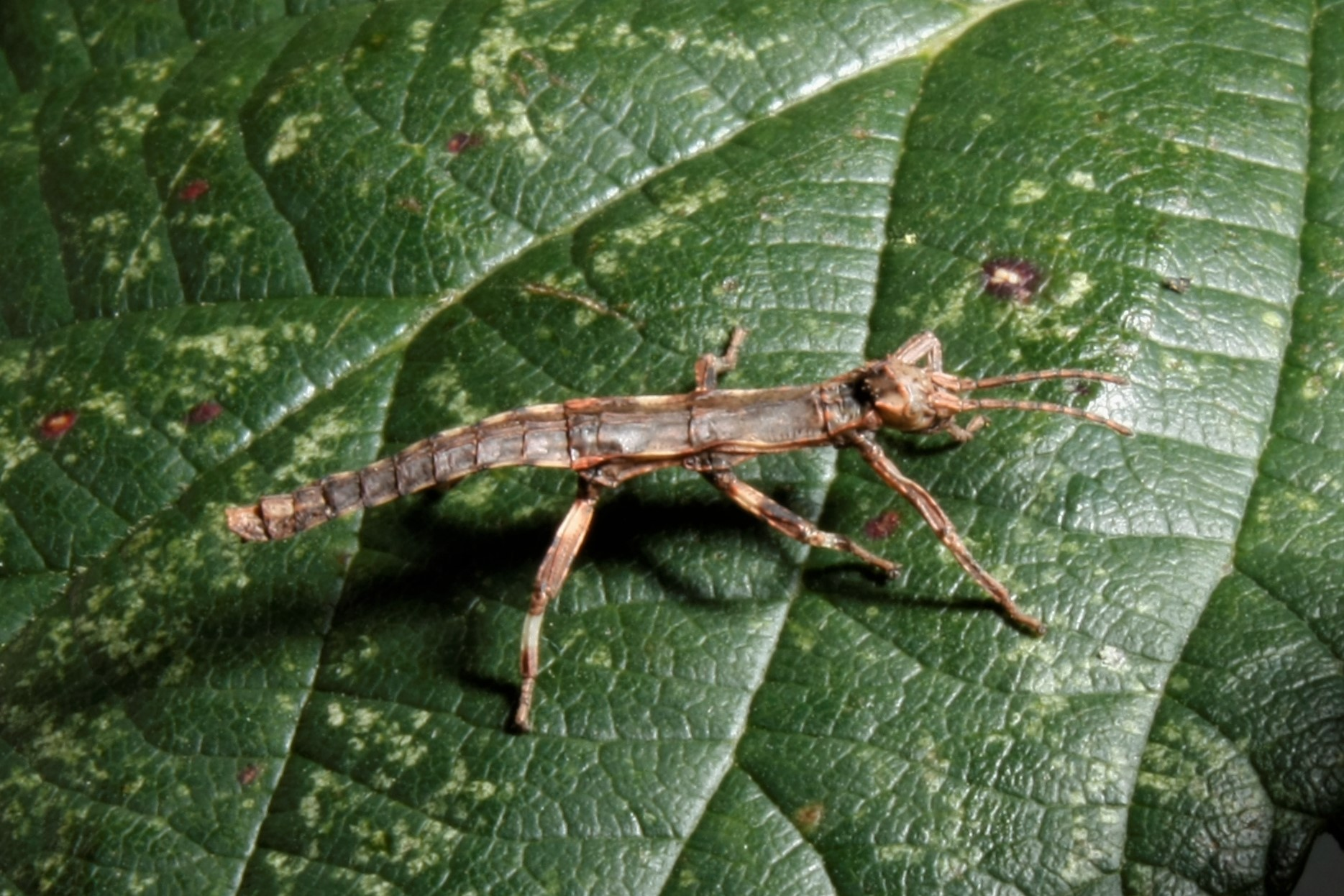
L1 nymph

The first and so far only breeding stock of this species in terrariums goes back to eggs laid by the female collected in Vietnam in 2013 by Bresseel and Constant. The resulting stock is parthenogenetic and was called Pylaemenes sp. 'Cat Ba' until its genus reassignment and species description in 2018.

The keeping and breeding of Orestes dittmari is comparatively delicate. In keeping conditions similar to those of other Orestes species, there are often losses. In particular, animals that have fallen on their backs on the ground are often unable to straighten themselves up and then partially die. Leaves of bramble or other Rosaceae are eaten.
