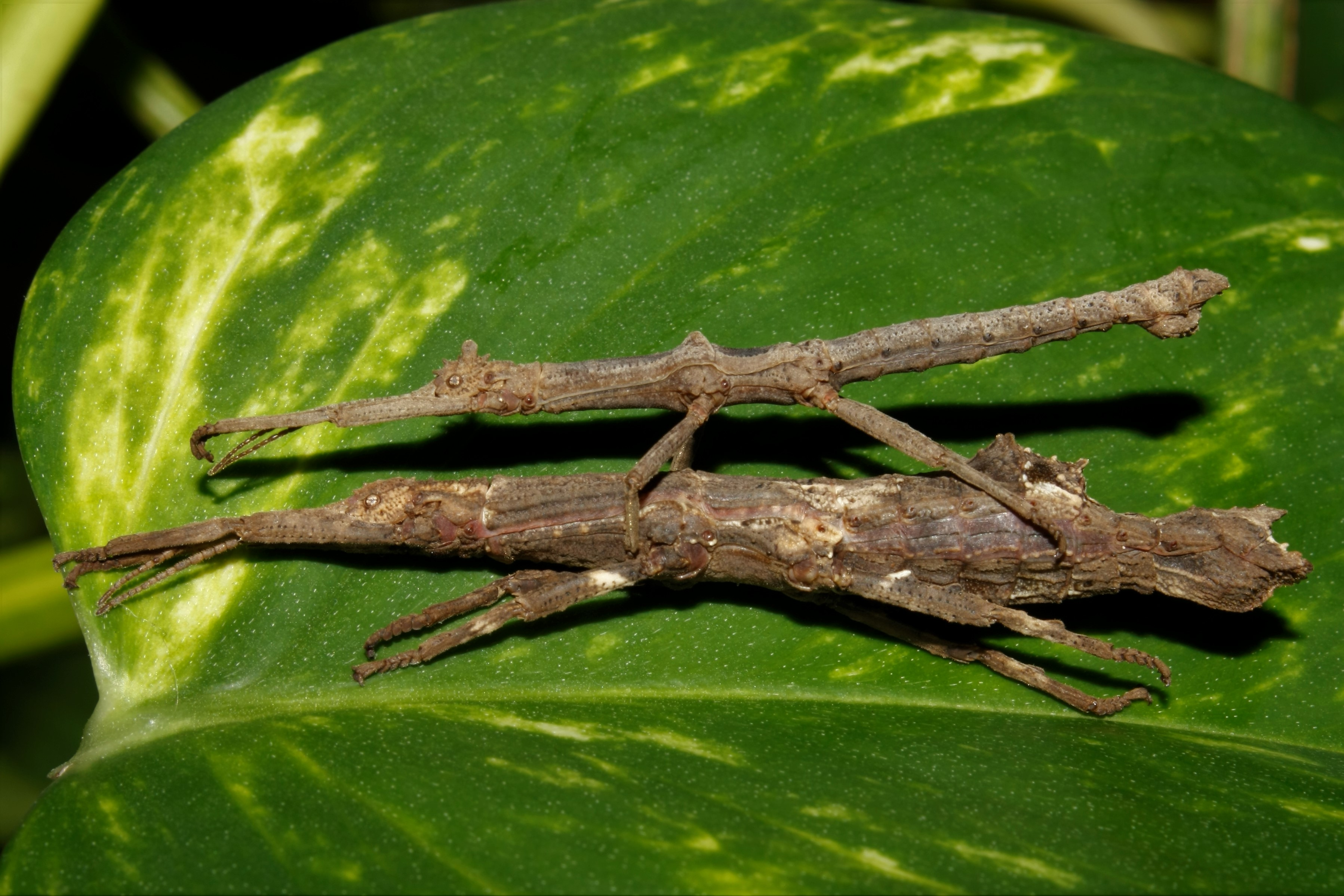
- Orestes draegeri 'Dong Nai', pair

Scientific classification
- Kingdom: Animalia
- Phylum: Arthropoda
- Clade: Pancrustacea
- Class: Insecta
- Order: Phasmatodea
- Superfamily: Bacilloidea
- Family: Heteropterygidae
- Subfamily: Dataminae
- Genus: Orestes
- Species: O. draegeri

Binomial name
- Orestes draegeri Bresseel & Constant, 2018

= Orestes draegeri =

Species of stick insect

Orestes draegeri is a species of stick insects in the subfamily Dataminae and tribe Datamini.

- - - Orestes sp. 'Andaman'
    - Orestes mouhotii 'Kirirom'
  - Orestes draegeri 'Dong Nai'
    = Orestes sp. 'Pu Mat'
    = Orestes sp. 2 'Bach Ma'
    = Orestes "mouhotii (PSG 192)

Relationships between Orestes draegeri and their sister species or stocks according to Sarah Bank et al. (2021)

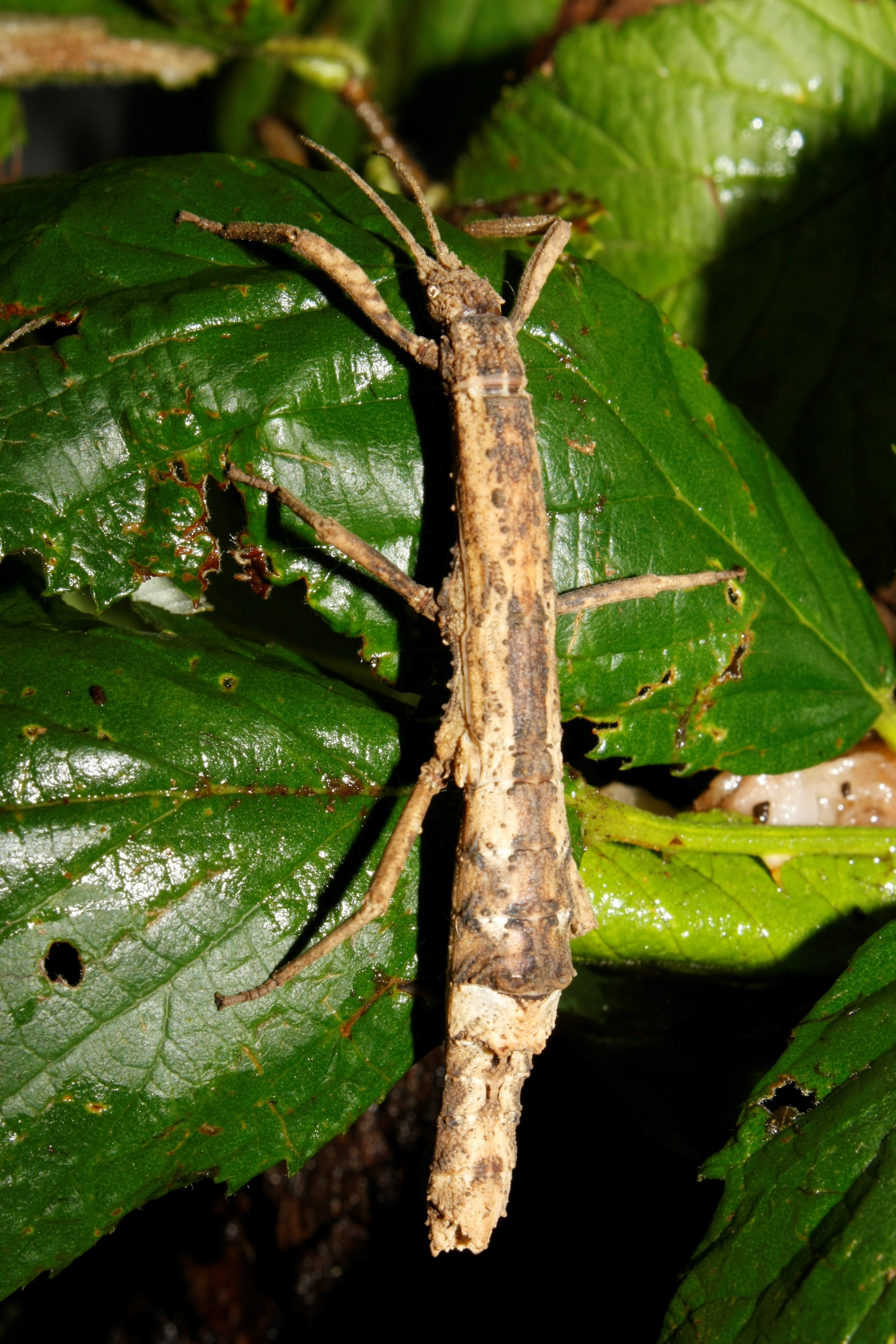
Orestes draegeri, female from the Bạch Mã National Park

== Characteristics ==
Orestes draegeri is a very slender and elongated species with relatively short legs. It is very similar in appearance to Orestes mouhotii, from which it differs in its relatively shorter legs.

Males are approximately 40.0 to 41.2 millimetres (1.57 to 1.62 in) long. In front of and behind the eyes there are mostly pairs of more or less distinct structures that are species-specific (see also acanthotaxy of Heteropterygidae). The three pairs of occipital spines are designed as follows: The anterior supra-antennals are recognizable spinose and slightly pointed outwards. The pairs of anterior and posterior supra-occipitals behind it are smaller. The vertex is significantly enlarged, blunt and laterally compressed with the anterior coronals, which creates conspicuous, ear-like horns (auricles). The paired supra-orbitals behind the eyes are recognizable bluntly spinous. Posterior and lateral coronals are recognizable as small pointed tubercles that form a crown with the tip of the postocular carina located behind the eye, a distinct edge. The eyes are relatively small, circular and protruding strongly hemispherical. The antennae are shorter than the legs and consist of 23 segments. While the structures on the head resemble those of Orestes mouhotii, these are missing in the males of Orestes draegeri distinct conical hump at posterior margin of the mesonotum which is slightly sulcate medially.

The females are approximately 45.7 to 47.1 millimetres (1.80 to 1.85 in) long. Their head is flat and shows only indistinct structures in the form of tubercles. The tibae of middle legs are compressed laterally at the top and have an indistinct tooth at the end and a clear tooth in the middle. The fourth tergite of the abdomen is indistinctly widened and almost parallel to the rear. On the back of the ninth tergite there is a clearly elongated, strongly roof-like ridge in the center. In the females of Orestes mouhotii this crest is not roof-like and elongated and not notched at the back.

== Distribution area ==
The species was found by Joachim Bresseel and Jérôme Constant in 2012 in the seasonal tropical forests in the Vietnamese provinces Lâm Đồng and Đồng Nai and here in the Dong Nai Biosphere Reserve, which includes Cát Tiên National Park (type locality). Following the investigations by Sarah Bank et al., in which Bresseel and Constant were also involved, it can also be found in the provinces Huế, Nghệ An and the northern provinces Vĩnh Phúc and Bắc Kạn. This means that their known distribution area extends almost over the whole of Vietnam.

== Taxonomy ==
From June 25 to July 6, 2012, Bresseel and Constant found representatives of the species in the biosphere reserve of Đồng Nai and on July 16, 2012 another male and four females in the Cát Tiên National Park. In their work on the genus Orestes published in 2018, they described this species as well as five others. The species name is dedicated to Holger Dräger, a German phasmid breeder who, along with other representatives of the Heteropterygidae, in particular keeps and breeds species or stocks which Bresseel and Constant brought with them from Southeast Asia. The male from Cát Tiên was deposited as holotype, two other males and twelve females, some of them were bred from the ones from Đồng Nai, were deposited as paratypes. The holotype and nine paratypes are deposited in the Museum of Natural Sciences in Brussels. The remaining five paratypes are in the Vietnam National Museum of Nature in Hanoi.

How genetic analysis by Sarah Bank et al show, forms Orestes draegeri within the genus Orestes together with Orestes mouhotii and another species from the Andamans, which is called Orestes sp. 'Andaman' and is an undescribed species, a clade of very similar species. In all of them, the males have two almost semicircular horns (auricles) on their heads, while the females have a flat head without any major elevations. Bresseel and Constant, who took over the taxonomic assignment of the species as co-authors, only referred to animals originating from the Kirirom National Park in Cambodia as Orestes mouhotii, while all the other investigated populationss identified as Orestes draegeri. Should the species from Kiriom not be identical to the holotype of Orestes mouhotii and the holotypes of their two synonyms Dares fulmeki and Orestes verruculatus, the ones from Kiriom would be another species and Orestes draegeri would be a synonym of one of the mentioned three names.

== Rearing ==
The species has been sexually bred since 2012. The breeding stock goes back to the animals collected by Bresseel and Constant in Đồng Nai, which were successfully reproduced by Rob Krijns. Up to its description it was called as Pylaemenes sp. 'Dong Nai'. It is listed by the Phasmid Study Group under PSG number 397. According to more recent studies, at least one of the stocks originally kept as Orestes mouhotii with PSG number 192 from Thailand and West Malaysia can be assigned to this species. In addition, further parthenogenetic stocks of Orestes draegeri were introduced from Vietnam by Bresseel and Constant, for example in 2015 from the Ba Bể National Park and the Melinh biodiversity station and in 2017 from the Bạch Mã National Park and from the Pu Mat National Park.

== Gallery ==
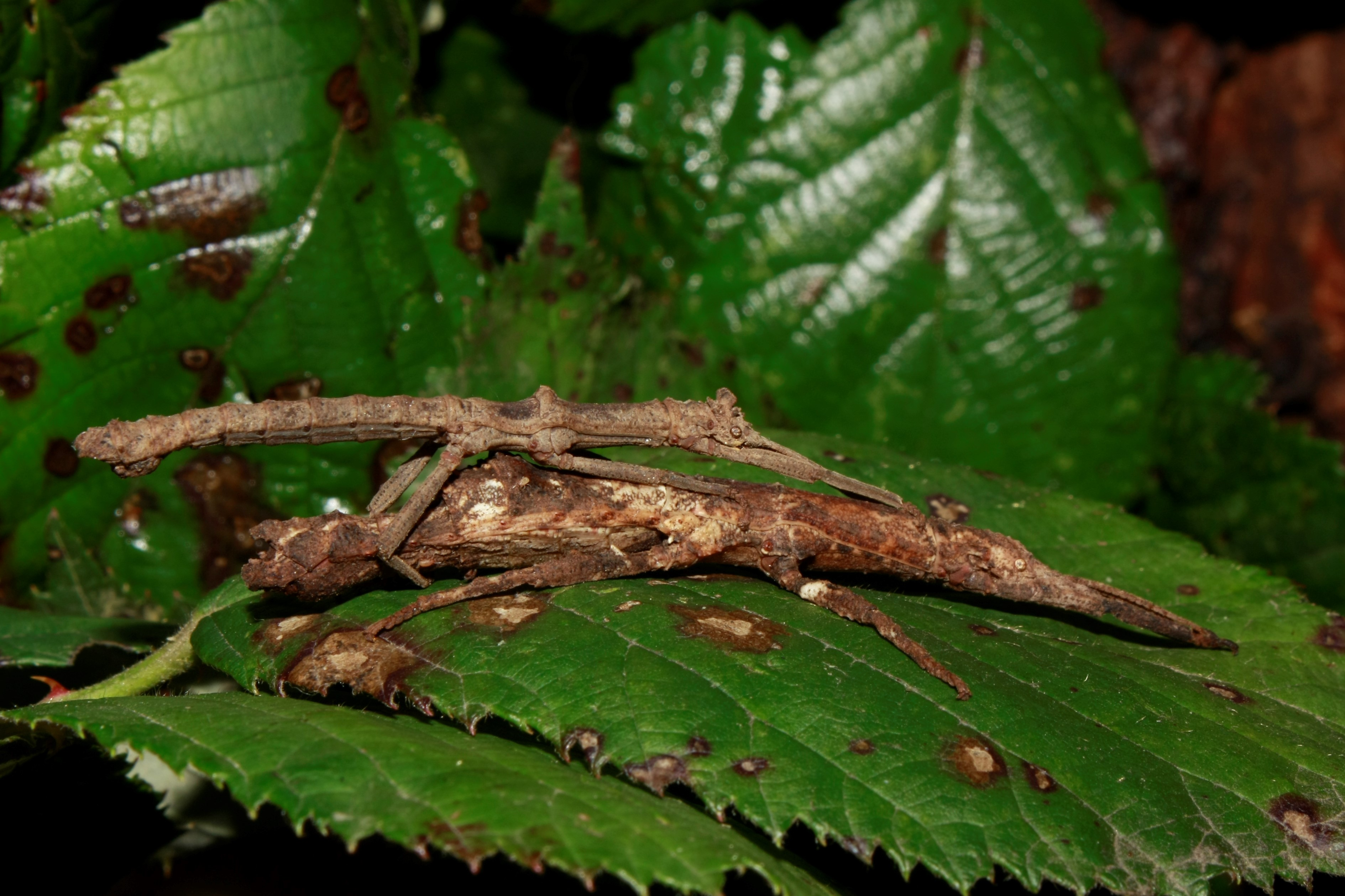
pair of the stock from Dong Nai

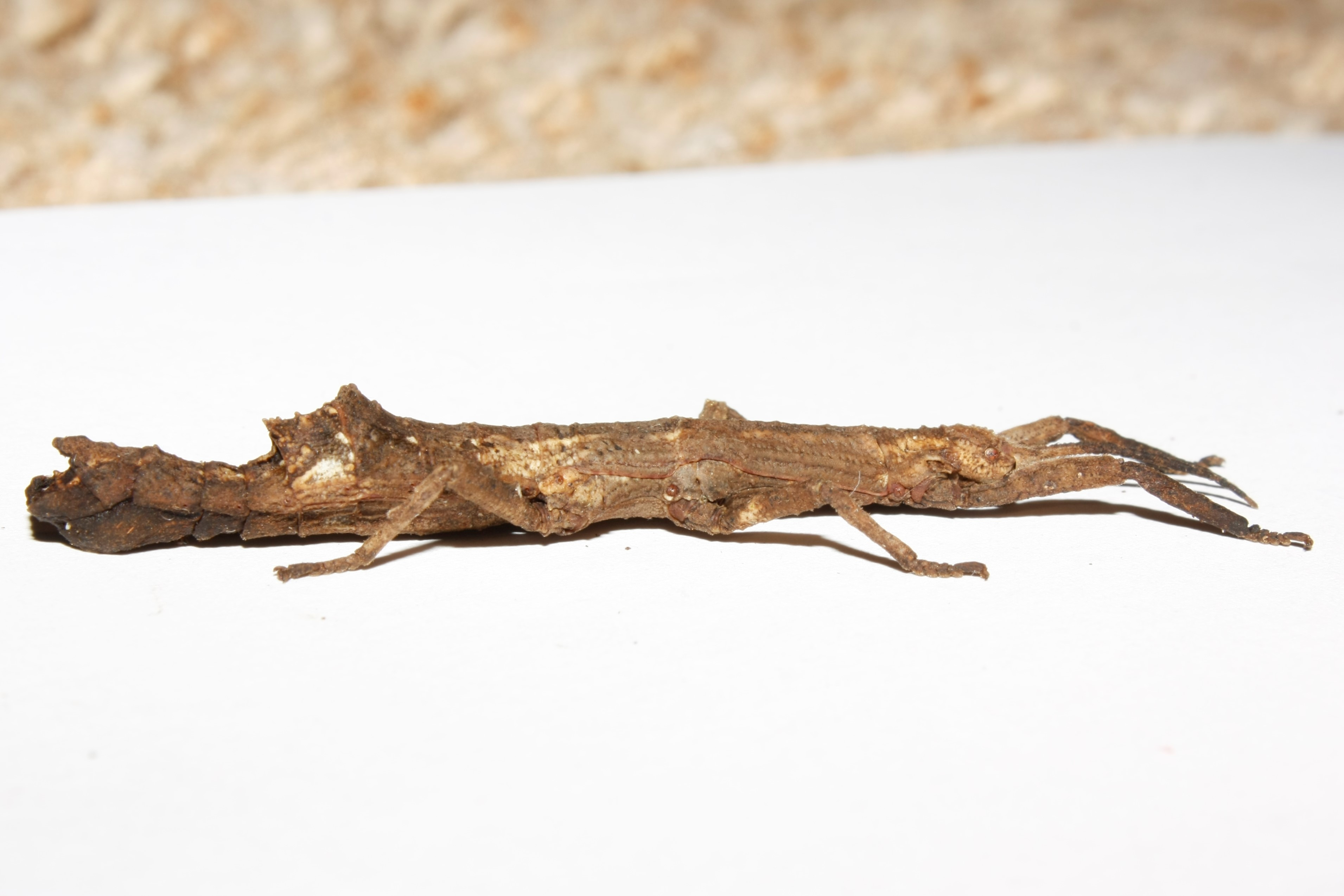
female of the stock from Dong Nai – lateral

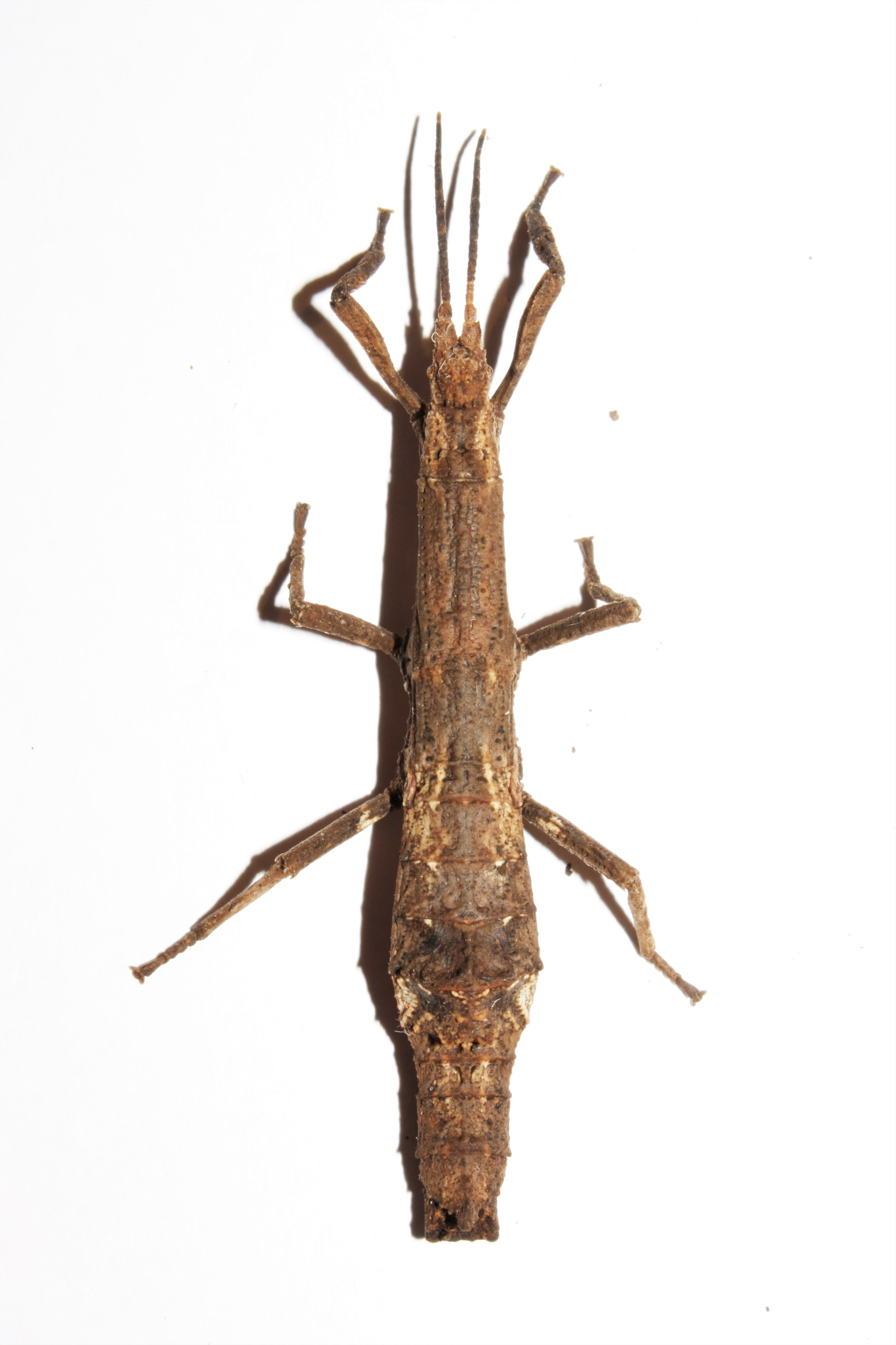
female of the stock from Dong Nai – dorsal

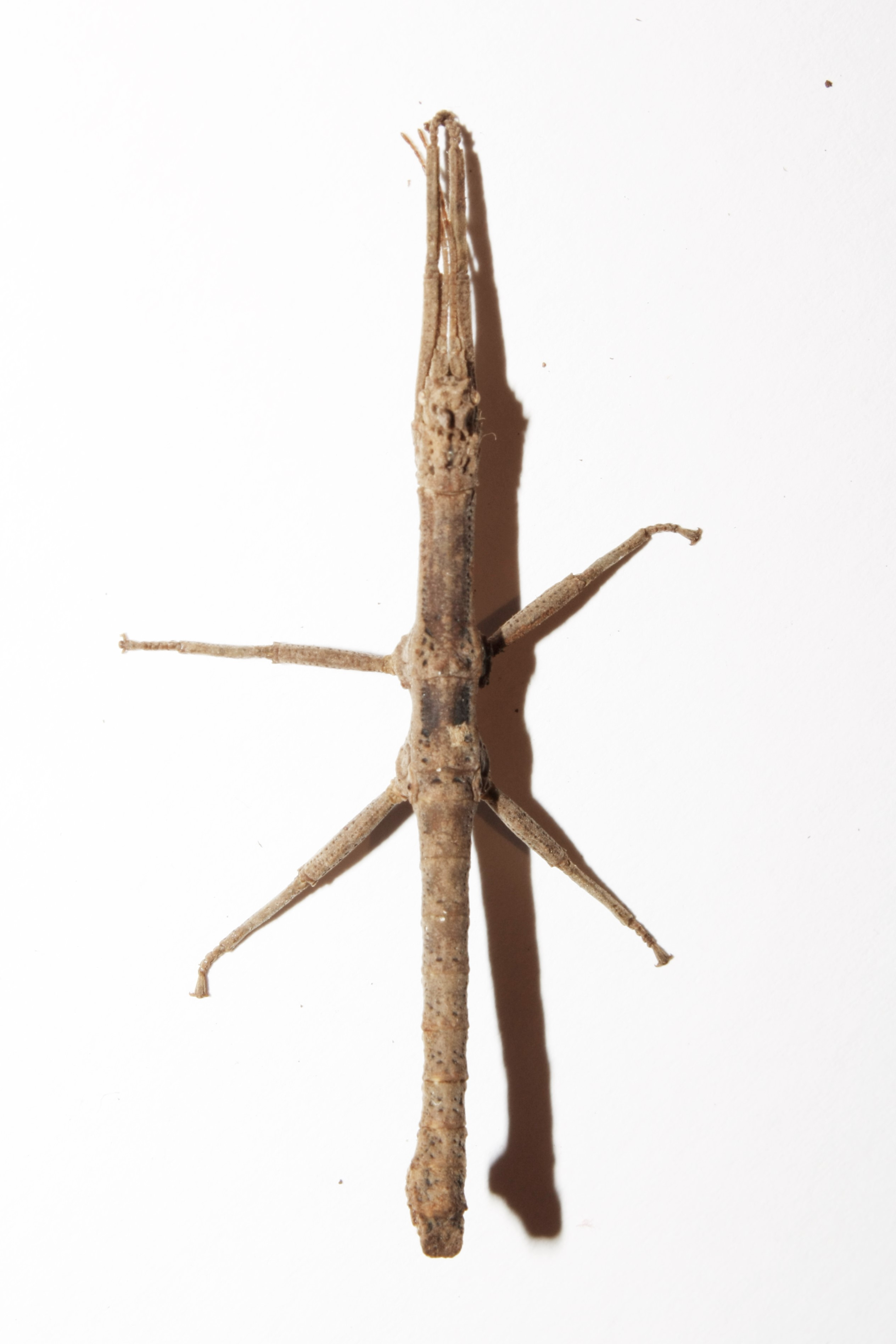
male of the stock from Dong Nai – dorsal

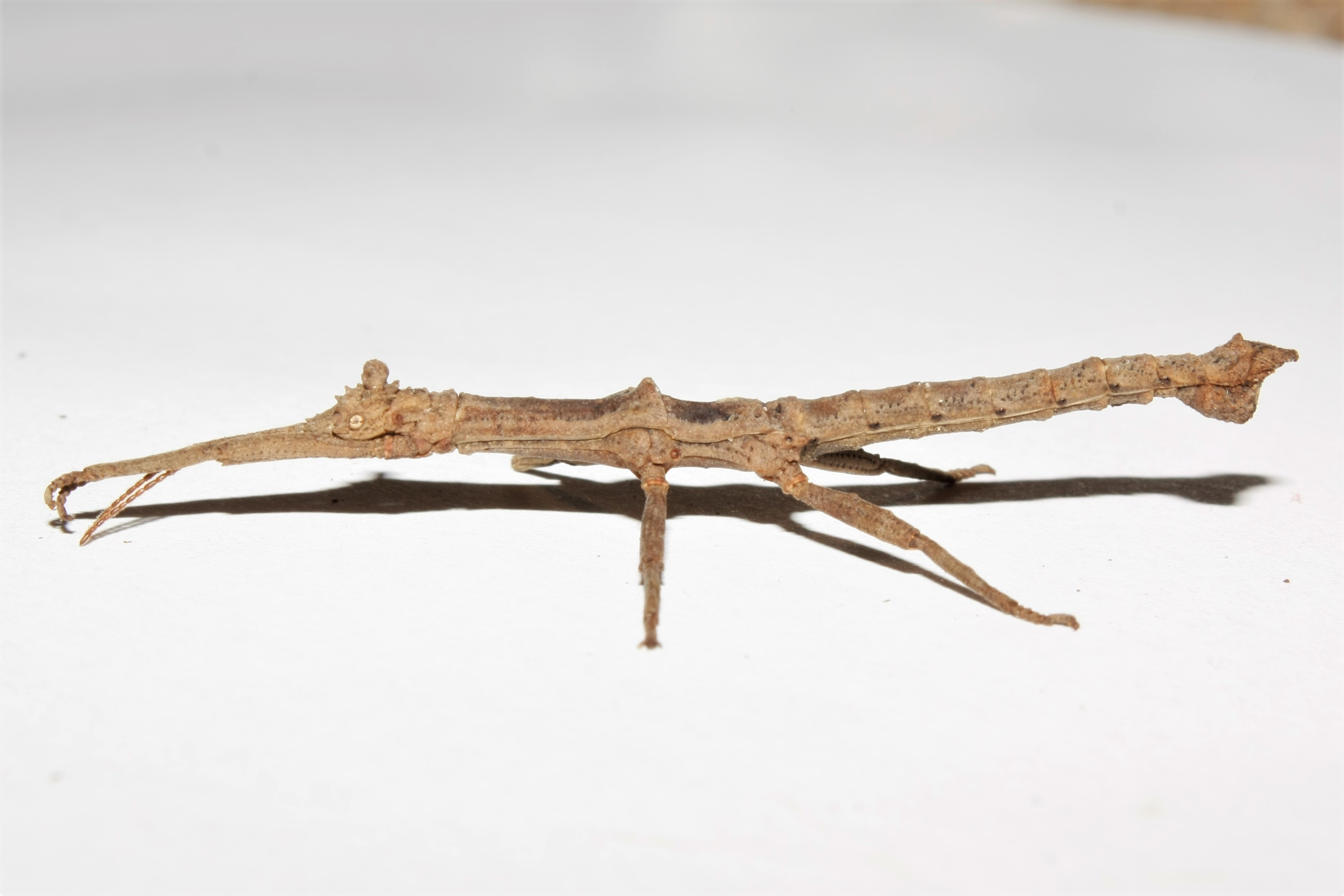
male of the stock from Dong Nai – lateral
