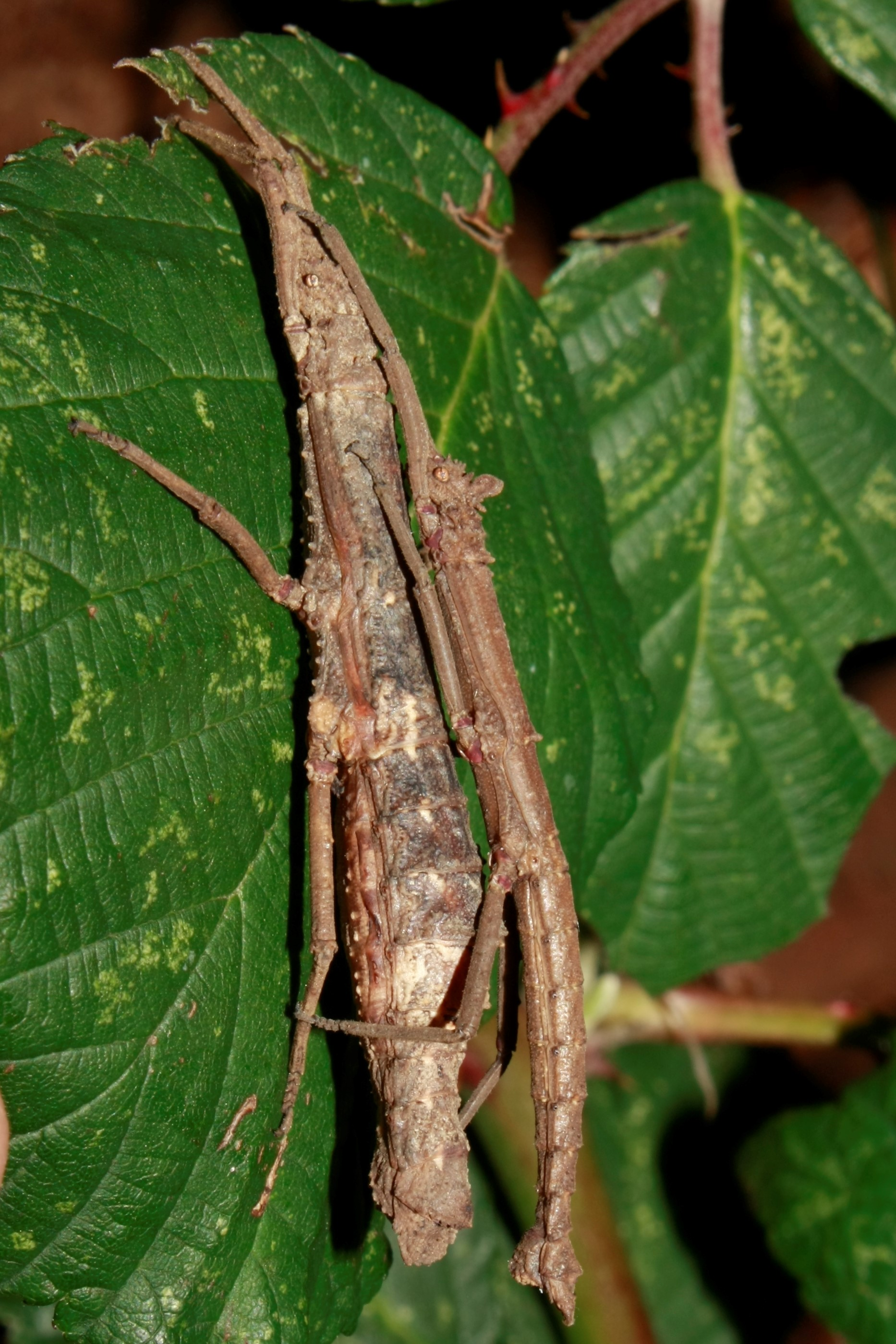
- Orestes mouhotii, pair from Kirirom

Scientific classification
- Kingdom: Animalia
- Phylum: Arthropoda
- Class: Insecta
- Order: Phasmatodea
- Superfamily: Bacilloidea
- Family: Heteropterygidae
- Subfamily: Dataminae
- Genus: Orestes
- Species: O. mouhotii

Binomial name
- Orestes mouhotii (Bates, 1865)

Synonyms
- Acanthoderus mouhotii Bates, 1865; Dares fulmeki Werner, 1934; Datames mouhotii (Bates, 1865); Orestes mouhoutii Fritzsche, 1999; Pylaemenes mouhotii Fritzsche, 2000; Orestes verrucatulus Otte & Brock, 2005; Orestes verruculatus Redtenbacher, 1906

= Orestes mouhotii =

Species of stick insect

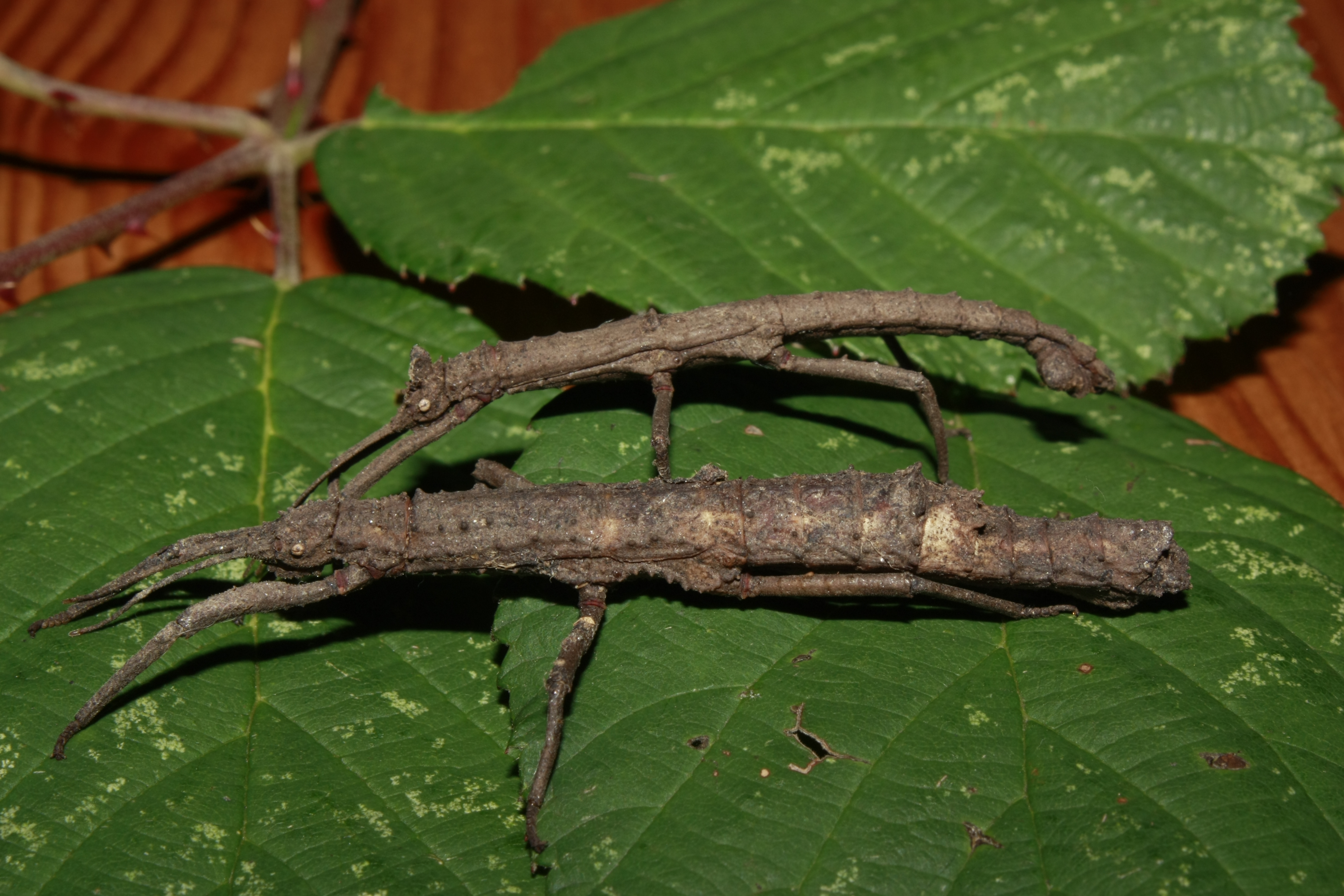
Pair of the still undescribed sister species of Orestes mouhotii, which is currently called Orestes sp. 'Andaman' found on Swaraj Island, in the Andaman Islands

Orestes mouhotii is an insect species belonging to the order of Phasmatodea. Because of its synyonym Orestes verruculatus, it is the type species of the genus Orestes. Because of its compact body shape, the species is sometimes referred to as small cigar stick insect.

== Characteristics ==
The females are 45 to 55 millimetres (1.8 to 2.2 in) long and thus longer than the maximal 40 millimetres (1.6 in) long males. Both sexes have noticeably short legs and have beige to brown patterns. The males wear semicircular horns (auricles) on their head. While they are overall thinner and are characterized by a slightly thickened end of abdomen, the more compact females have a typical thickening immediately behind the middle of the abdomen, which is especially recognizable as the height increases. Freshly adult females are very vividly drawn light and dark brown and often have light, almost white areas, especially on the sides and in the middle of the abdomen. Over the middle of the body there is usually a particularly distinct dark brown longitudinal band on the front abdomen and the metanotum, which is somewhat lighter on the mesonotum and is flanked here by black-colored tubercles. This high-contrast drawing fades with increasing age and the insects become increasingly uniformly light brown.

== Way of life and reproduction ==
During the day, the insects put their hind legs back and the middle legs stretched forward close to the body. At the same time, the fore legs and the antennae are stretched forward. In this position, the phytomimesis is so perfect that the insects can hardly be distinguished from a short, broken branch. At night they feed on food plants, which includes Curculigo species, Dioscorea species like Dioscorea glabra, Dracaena species like Dracaena fragrans and Dracaena surculosa as well as Epipremnum species.

The females begin about two months after the moult for the imago to lay the eggs one by one, about 3 millimetres (0.12 in) long, 2 millimetres (0.079 in) wide and an average of 14 milligrams. The nymphs hatch from the eggs after just two months. They need about a year to develop into an imago. The life expectancy of adult females is also another year. The species reproduces by parthenogenesis (female-only asexual reproduction), cyclically, so natural populations are generally exclusively female. Males are rare even in sexually reproducing populations and occur in a ratio of 1 to 20.

== Taxonomy ==
- - - Orestes sp. 'Andaman'
    - Orestes mouhotii 'Kirirom'
  - Orestes draegeri 'Dong Nai'
    = Orestes sp. 'Pu Mat'
    = Orestes sp. 2 'Bach Ma'
    = Orestes "mouhotii (PSG 192)

Relationships between Orestes mouhotii and their sister species or stocks according to Sarah Bank et al. (2021)

The species was described in 1865 by Henry Walter Bates as Acanthoderus mouhotii. Bates chose the species name in honor of the French Southeast Asia traveler Henri Mouhot. As holotype a subadult female from Thai Chantaboun is deposited in the University of Oxford. In 1875 Carl Stål transferred Acanthoderus mouhotii and Acanthoderus oileus to the genus Datames which he specially established for these two species. Whose type species Datames oileus, established by James Abram Garfield Rehn in 1904, was later transferred to the genus Pylaemenes and the genus Datames was synonymized with this in 1998. For Orestes mouhotii the name Pylaemenes mouhotii was partly used around the turn of the millennium (1998 to 2000)

In 1906 Josef Redtenbacher described a new species under the name Orestes verruculatus in a genus specially established for this. He also chose a subadult female as their holotype. It was collected in Bangkok and is deposited in the National Museum of Natural History, France in Paris. Orestes verruculatus, as first described species even the type species of Orestes, was synonymous with Orestes mouhotii by Oliver Zompro in 2004. In result the valid name is Orestes mouhotii and consists of the genus name of the synonymized Orestes verruculatus and the species name of first described species. The newly combined name Orestes mouhotii was first used as early as 1999 by Ingo Fritzsche and used later in the same year by Zompro and Fritzsche. Although Zompro is the first author of one of the 1999 papers, he prioritized 2004 a work published by him in 2000 as the first mention of Orestes mouhotii. But an article published in 2000 not cited in 2004 fitting as a source.

Franz Werner described in 1934 with Dares fulmeki a species which was already synonymous in 1935 by Klaus Günther with Datames oileus (today valid name Pylaemenes oileus). Paul D. Brock assigned Dares fulmeki in 1998 to Datames mouhotii and thus made this species another synonym of Orestes mouhotii in today's sense. The holotype of Dares fulmeki is an adult female from Medan (Sumatra) in the Natural History Museum Vienna.

As genetic analysis by Sarah Bank et al show, Orestes mouhotii forms within the genus Orestes together with Orestes draegeri and another undescribed species from the Andamans, called Orestes sp. 'Andaman', a clade of very similar species. In all of them, the males have two almost semicircular horns (auricles) on their head, while the females have a flat head without any major elevations. The sister species of Orestes mouhotii is therefore the species from the Andamans. Joachim Bresseel, who co-authored the taxonomic classification of the species, only refers to the animals from the Kirirom National Park in Cambodia as Orestes mouhotii. All other investigated populations are assigned to Orestes draegeri. This assignment can only be valid if the holotype of Orestes mouhotii, as well as the holotypes of the two synonyms, prove to be identical to the species originating from the Cambodian Kiriom. Otherwise the animals from Kiriom would be a different species and Orestes draegeri would be a synonym. Francis Seow-Choen takes in 2018 the view that all of him in Phuket, on Malay Peninsula and in Singapore examined animals are represantitives of Orestes mouhotii.

== Distribution area ==
The locations of the holotypes of Orestes mouhotii and that of its synonym Orestes verruculatus in southern Thailand are considered to be a secured occurrence of the species. Otherwise, depending on the interpretation of the species belonging to Cambodia, the distribution area extends over the south of Vietnam, Malay Peninsula and Singapore to Sumatra. Also in the Chinese province Yunnan the species has been found. Males are not known from the entire range and some populations are considered parthenogenetic. Only the population found by Ingo Fritzsche in the Khao Yai National Park in Thailand, as well as the population found by Jérôme Constant in the Kirirom National Park in Cambodia in 2015 are verifiably sexual. The sister species collected in May 2018 by Christoph Röhrs on the Andamans on Havelock Island, also occurs there sexually.

== Terraristic ==
Already since the late 1990 insects have been kept in the terrariums under the name Orestes mouhotii. When Ingo Fritzsche brought males and females collected in the Khao Yai National Park in Thailand between the end of 1997 and the beginning of 1998, the species was the species was briefly bred sexually before the males were lost. In 2007 Kai Schütte brought a parthenogenetic stock with him from Tapah Hills in Perak near Pahang at Malay Peninsula. After many years only these parthenogenetic stocks had been in breeding without naming the location, Jérôme Constant brought insects of both sexes from the Kiriom National Park in Cambodia in 2015, which means that since then a sexual stock with information on the origin has been in breeding again. According to the 2021 by Bank et al published genetic analysis, all other stocks, some of which were included in the analysis under the name Orestes mouhotii, are representatives of Orestes draegeri described in 2018. The species known as Orestes sp. 'Andaman' is in sexually bred.

Orestes mouhotii needs a higher humidity. For this reason the use of terrarium with small ventilation slots is recommended. A layer of earth is suitable as a substrate, which can be covered with moss on which the eggs can be laid. Leaves of hazel, oak and bramble are eaten. Orestes mouhotii is managed by the Phasmid Study Group under PSG number 192.

== Gallery ==
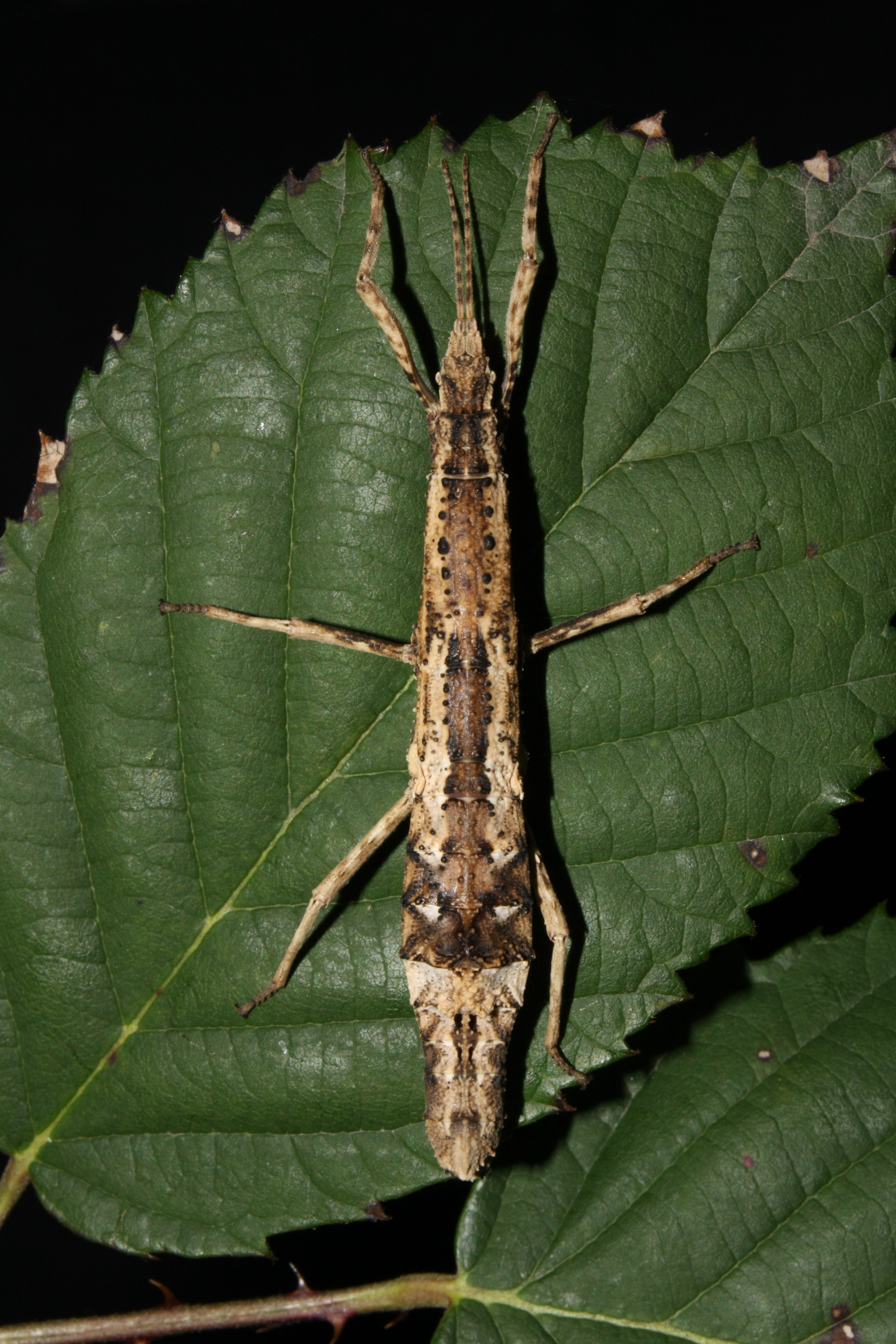
freshly adult female

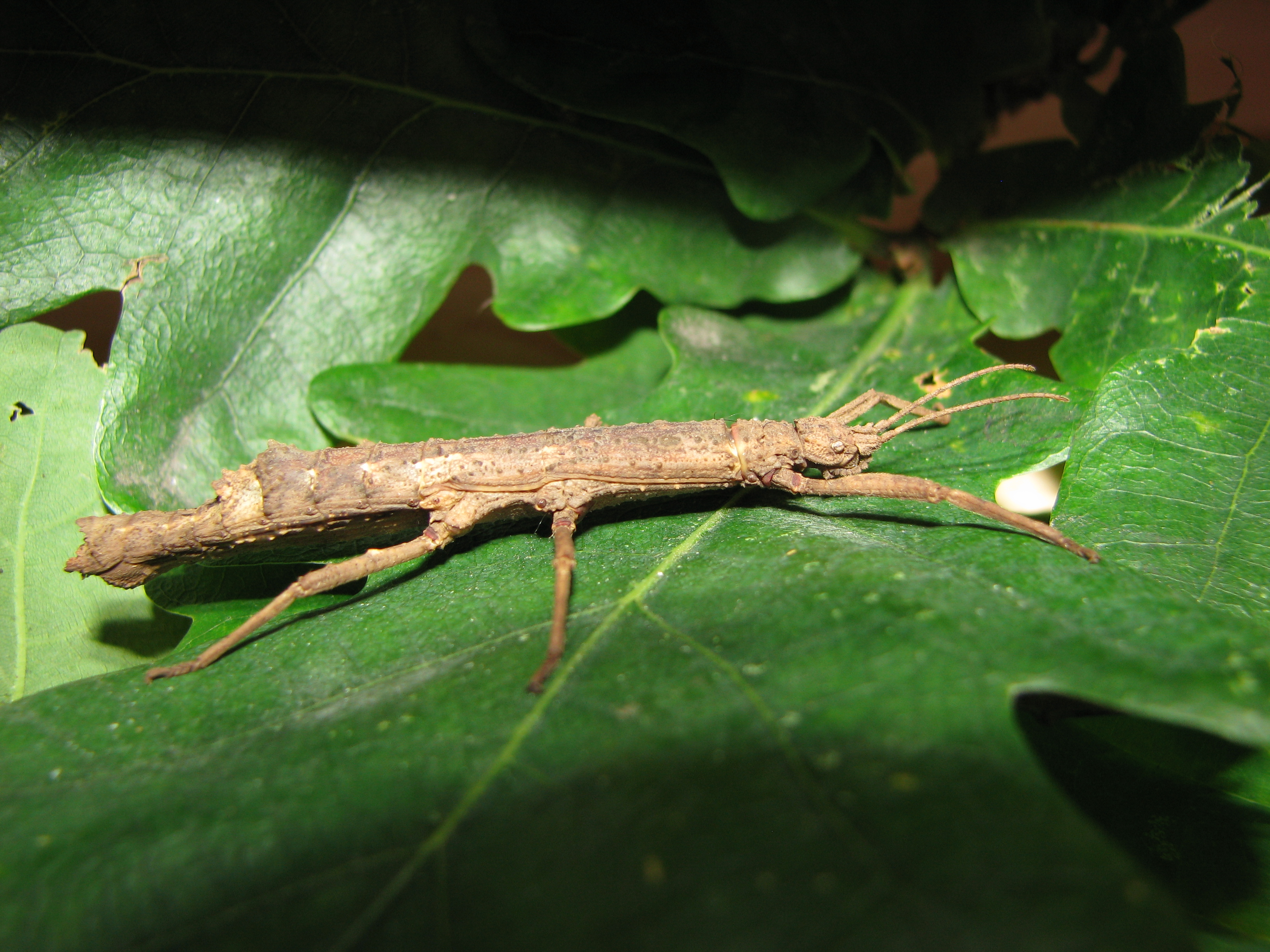
older female

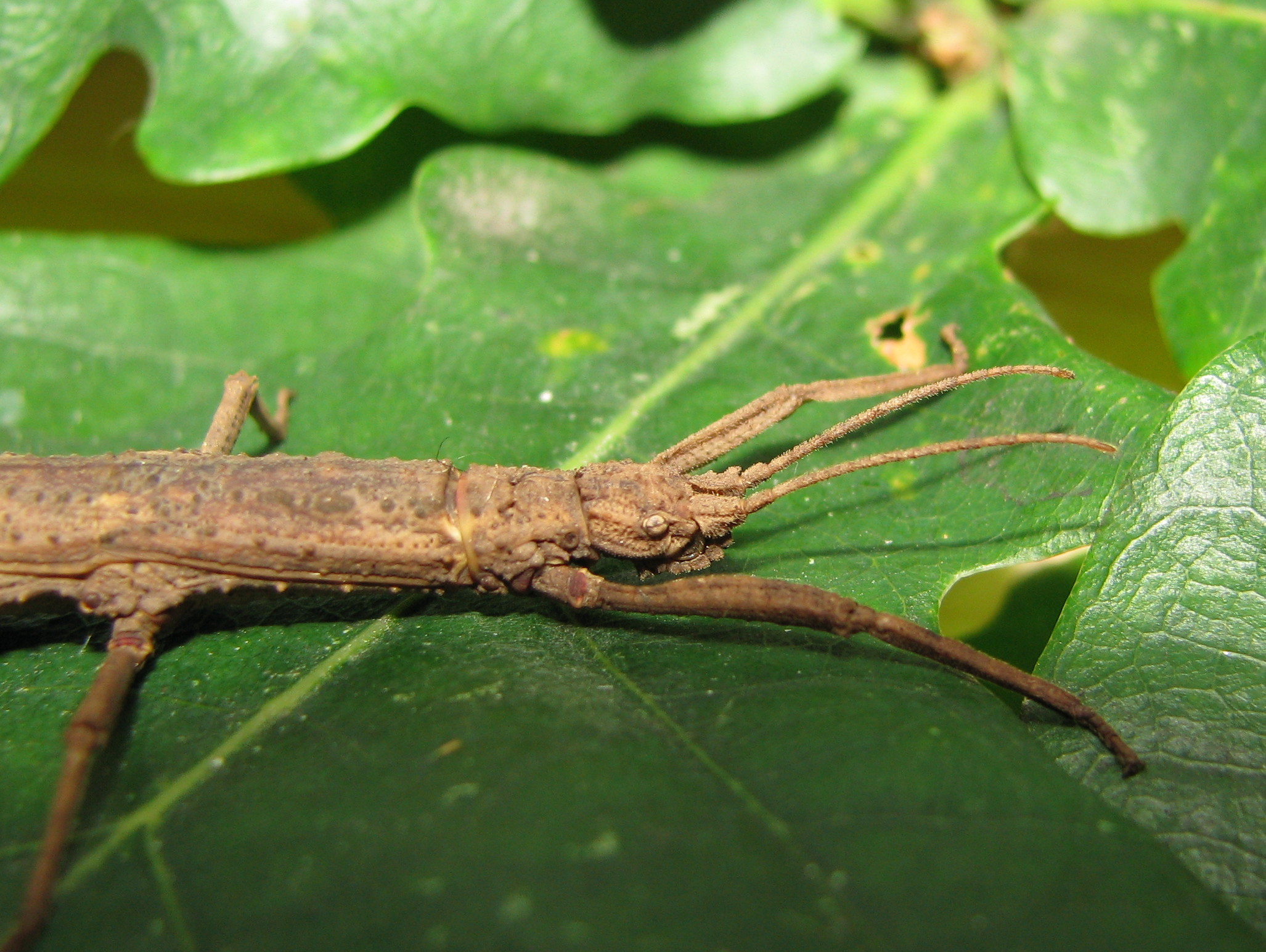
portrait of an older female

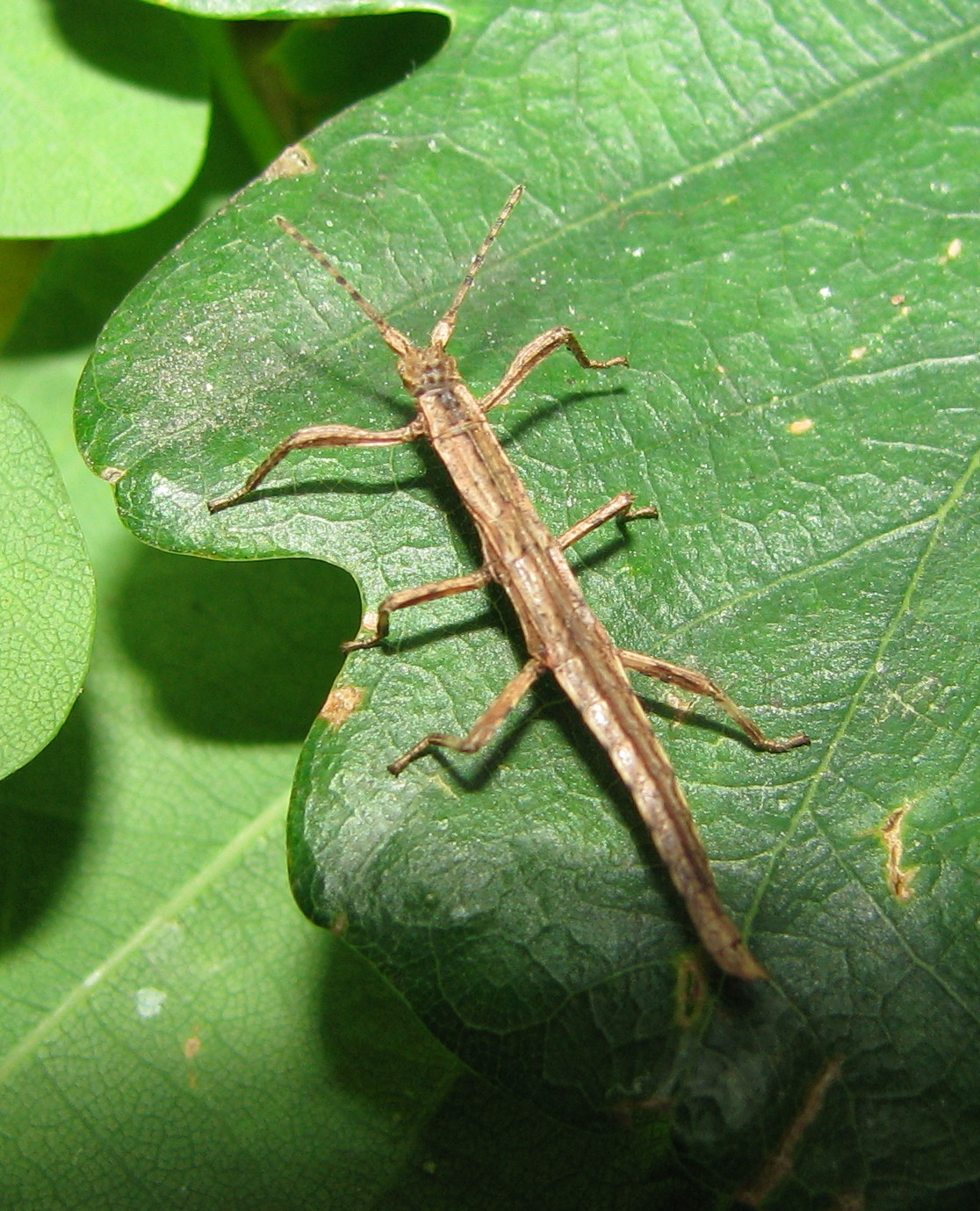
female nymph

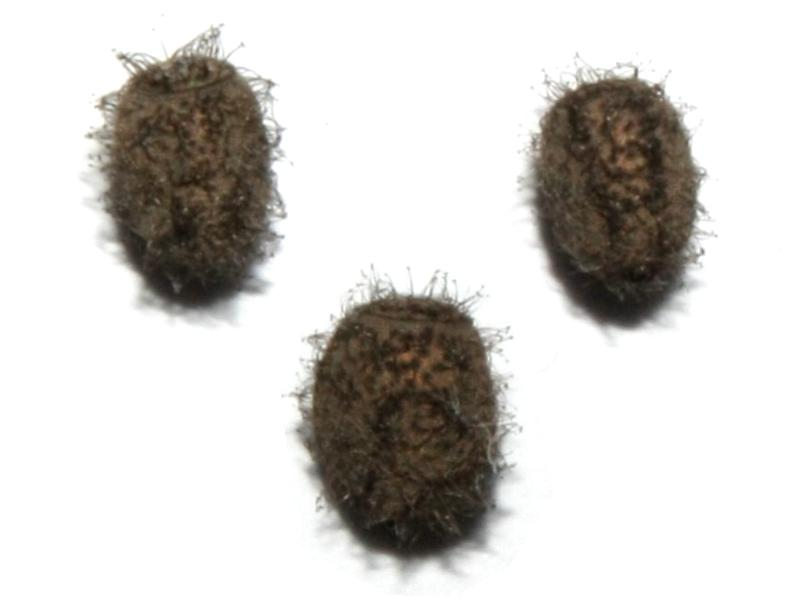
eggs in frontal, dorsal and lateral view
