= Tây Yên Tử =

- Commune
- Location in Vietnam
- Coordinates: 21°12′55″N 106°45′53″E
- Country: Vietnam
- City: Bắc Ninh

Area
  - Total: 82.06 km^{2} (31.68 sq mi)

Population (2019)
  - Total: 5,959
  - Density: 73/km^{2} (190/sq mi)
- Time zone: UTC+7 (UTC+7)

Tây Yên Tử is a commune (xã) of Bắc Ninh in north-eastern Vietnam.
