= Kirirom National Park =

National park in Cambodia

- Preah Suramarit-Kossamak Kirirom National Park
- IUCN category II (national park)
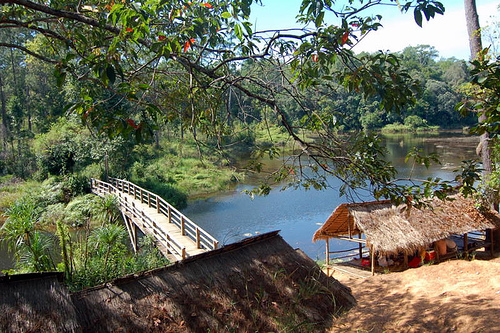
- A natural lake in Kirirom

- Location within Cambodia
- Location: Phnom Sruoch District, Kampong Speu Province, Cambodia
- Nearest city: Chbar Mon
- Coordinates: 11°18′37″N 104°03′04″E
- Area: 283.75 km^{2} (109.56 sq mi)
- Established: 1993

Kirirom National Park (Khmer: ឧទ្យានជាតិគិរីរម្យ), officially Preah Suramarit-Kossamak Kirirom National Park (Khmer: ឧទ្យានជាតិព្រះសុរាម្រិត-កុសមៈ គិរីរម្យ), is a national park in Kampong Speu Province, Cambodia. It is Cambodia's first officially designated national park, established in 1993. Kirirom means "Happiness Mountain" or "Mountain of Joy" in the Khmer language. It is located about 120 kilometres (75 mi) west of the national capital, Phnom Penh. From the city, National Road 4 passes about 24 kilometres (15 mi) from the park.

== Description ==
It is situated in the eastern part of the Cardamom Mountains on a plateau at a mean elevation of 2,200 feet (670 m). The highest peak is Phnum Chivit at an elevation of 949 metres (3,114 ft) and a topographic prominence of 797 m (2615 ft).

During the day, the temperature averages about 25 °C (77 °F), 5 to 10 °C (41 to 50 °F) at night.

== Flora and fauna ==
Due to its elevation, it is home to dense pine (Pinus merkusii) forests, unusual for Cambodia. There are also orchids and ferns.

The park is home to various animal species, some of them endangered, such as the:

- banteng
- civet
- deer
- elephant
- gaur
- gibbon
- great hornbill
- green peafowl
- leopard
- sun bear
- tiger

== Human activities ==
There are two derelict royal residences (from when Cambodia was a kingdom), which were abandoned due to Khmer Rouge guerrilla activity in the area; the Khmer Rouge were finally driven out around 1992. The Rough Guide to Cambodia notes that "the area has been entirely cleared of land mines."

The park faces the danger of deforestation and illegal logging from human encroachment.
