= Paul D. Brock =

British entomologist (born 1958)

- Born: 1958 (age 67–68)
- Known for: Taxonomy of stick insects (Phasmatodea)
- Scientific career
- Fields: Entomology
- Institutions: Natural History Museum, London
- Author abbrev. (zoology): Brock

Paul D. Brock (born 1958) is a British entomologist and a scientific associate in the Department of Life Sciences at the Natural History Museum, London. He is regarded as an expert on stick insects (order Phasmatodea).

== Early life and career ==
Brock grew up in Slough, Berkshire. At the age of ten, he kept his first stick insects. After leaving school at sixteen, he initially applied for an apprenticeship in a pest control laboratory, but instead began working as a bank clerk. In 1974, Judith Marshall, a scientific officer in the entomology department at the Natural History Museum, showed Brock a collection of stick insects that included several undescribed specimens. This encounter inspired him to study taxonomy and to prepare original species descriptions of numerous new taxa. He has described more than 30 species of stick insects, including the South African species Macynia mcgregororum, Clonaria cederbergensis, and Clonaria capemontana as well as the Vietnamese species Dajaca napolovi.

In addition, Brock has described several genera and is a co-author of more than 70 further taxa.

== Professional activities ==
From 1999 to 2001, Brock served as President of the Amateur Entomologists’ Society. Since October 2015, he has been Treasurer of the Phasmid Study Group. Since 2016, Brock has participated in a Natural History Museum project to assess the conservation status of more than 1,000 invertebrate species, alongside numerous other entomologists, including Axel Hochkirch. The project covers a wide range of taxa and regions, including millipedes and thorny grasshoppers from Madagascar, stick insects and velvet spiders from Australia, millipedes, cockroach crickets and birdwing butterflies from South Africa, mantises from India, endemic invertebrates from the Azores and Saint Helena, endemic spiders from Madeira, and endemic earthworms from New Zealand.

== Publications ==
Brock has authored or co-authored numerous books on insects, including:

- Stick Insects of Britain, Europe and the Mediterranean (1991)
- Catalogue of Type Specimens of Stick- and Leaf-Insects in the Naturhistorisches Museum Wien (1998)
- Stick and Leaf Insects of Peninsular Malaysia and Singapore (1999)
- The Amazing World of Stick and Leaf-Insects (1999)
- A Complete Guide to Breeding Stick and Leaf-Insects (2000)
- Rearing and Studying Stick and Leaf-Insects (2003)
- Phasmida Species File: Catalog of Stick and Leaf Insects of the World (2005)
- The Complete Field Guide to Stick and Leaf Insects of Australia (2009, with Jack Hasenpusch)
- A Photographic Guide to Insects of Southern Europe & the Mediterranean (2017)

His book The Amazing World of Stick and Leaf-Insects is widely regarded as a standard reference work on Phasmatodea. In 2007, Brock and Jack Hasenpusch published a major revision of Australian stick insects, describing 17 new species.

== Eponymy ==
The following stick insect taxa have been named in his honour:

- Alienobostra brocki Hausleithner, 1987
- Asceles brocki Seow-Choen, 2016
- Lamachodes brocki Ho, 2018
- Megacrania brocki Hsiung, 2002
- Planososibia brocki Seow-Choen, 2000
- Brockphasma Ho, Liu, Bresseel & Constant, 2014
