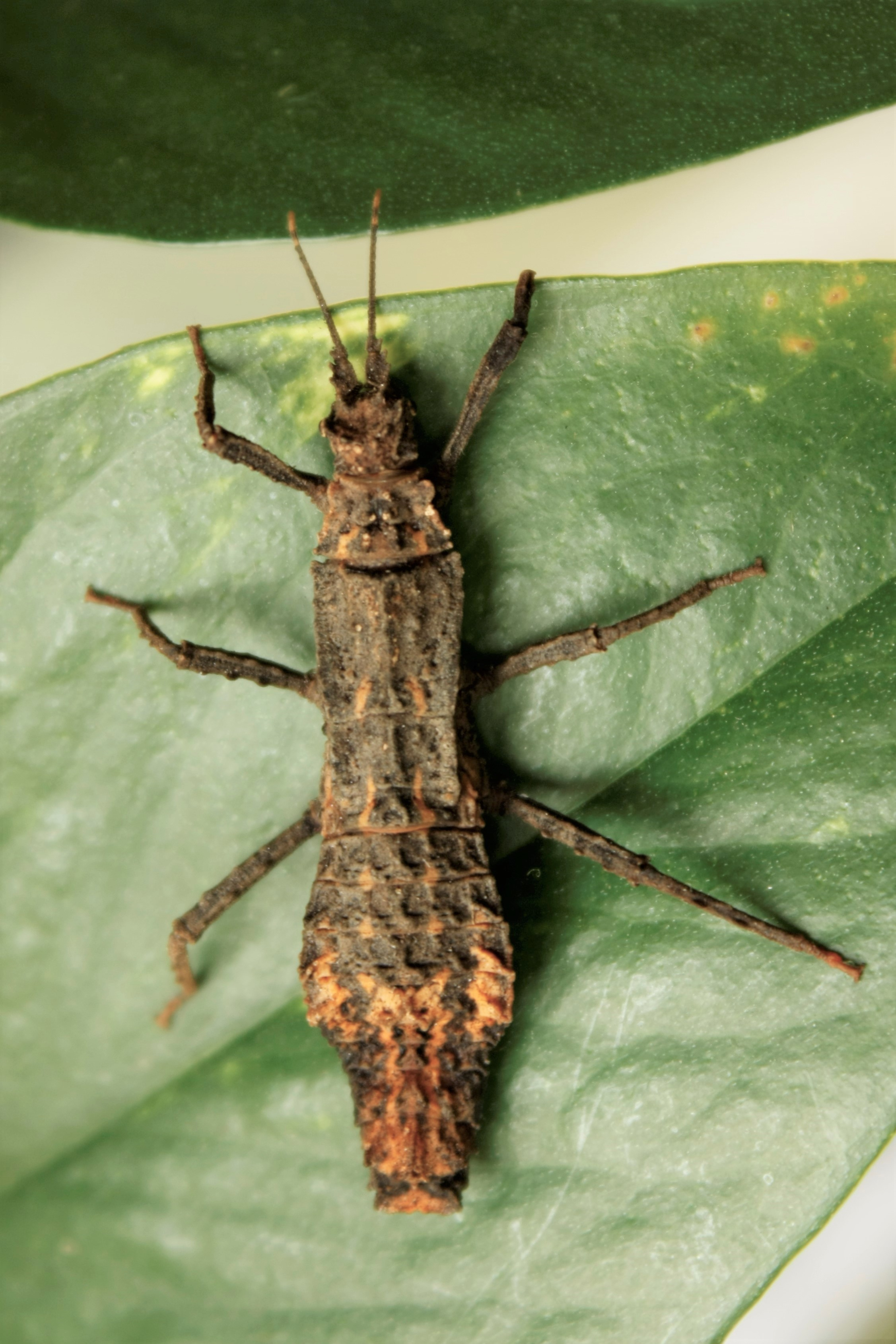
- Microrestes robustus, female

Scientific classification
- Domain: Eukaryota
- Kingdom: Animalia
- Phylum: Arthropoda
- Class: Insecta
- Order: Phasmatodea
- Family: Heteropterygidae
- Subfamily: Dataminae
- Tribe: Datamini
- Genus: Microrestes
- Species: M. robustus

Binomial name
- Microrestes robustus Bresseel & Constant, 2020

= Microrestes robustus =

Species of stick insect

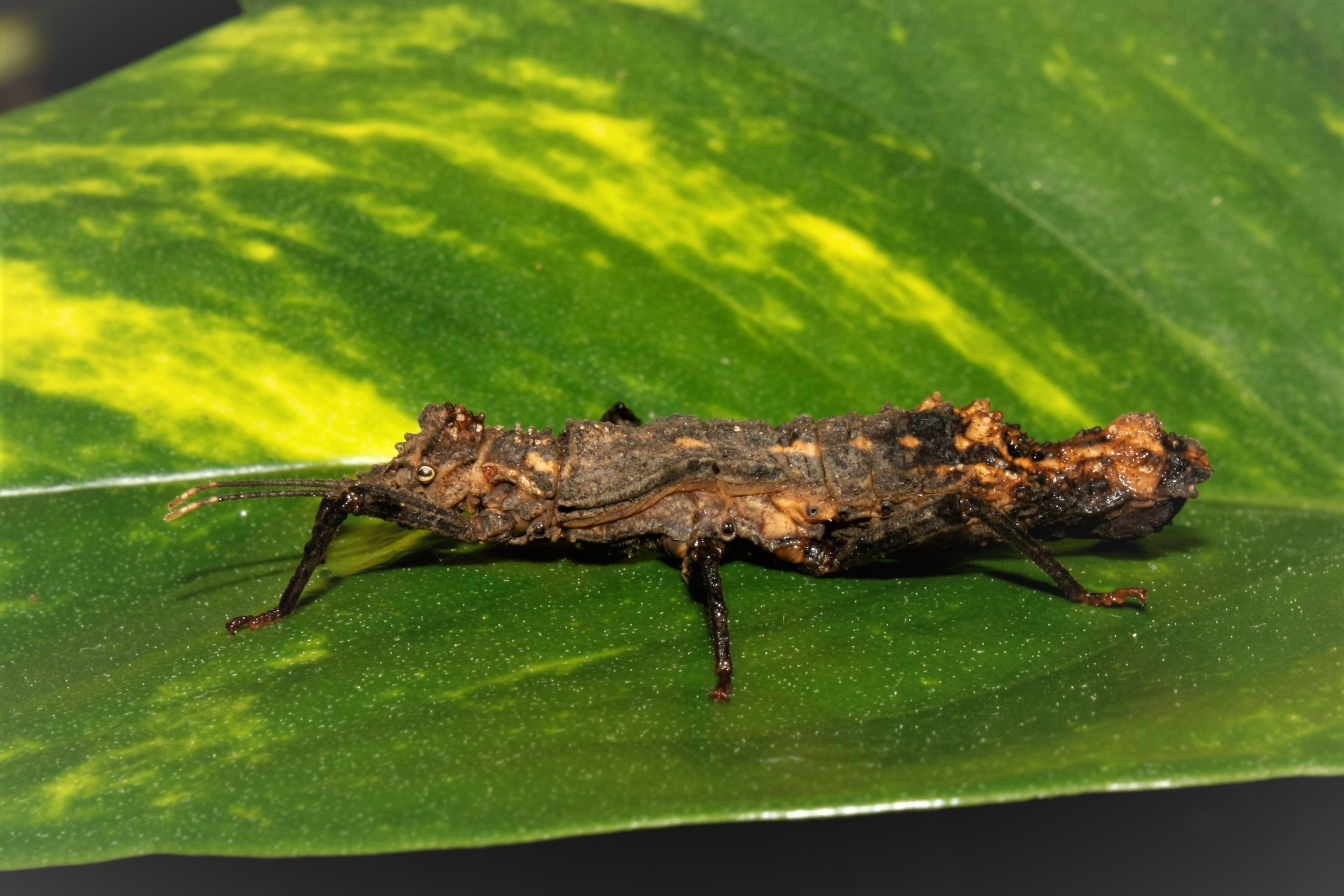
Female of a stock first named as Orestes sp. ‚Ngo Luong‘ Zuchtstamm

Microrestes robustus is a stick insect species native to northwestern Vietnam.

== Characteristics ==
Microrestes robustus can be distinguished from the only other species of the genus described so far, Microrestes trapezius, by its smaller size and less pronounced surface structure. The anterior side margins of the mesonotum are only reinforced with an indistinct hump, while in M. trapezius these are clearly spiny.

Females are about 34 millimetres (1.3 in) long and compact in habit. They show light, yellowish to orange-colored patterns on a brown ground color, which are more pronounced in the abdomen area. With age, they become uniform dark brown. On the 5.6 to 5.7 millimetres (0.22 to 0.22 in) long head, the supraantennas and the occipitals are present as small blunt spines. The vertex is raised and slightly elongated. The supraorbitals, procoronals, and anterior coronals are almost continuously fused into two wavy crests that almost touch posteriorly. The posterior and lateral coronals are reduced to rounded protuberances. The 19-segmented antennae are shorter than the legs. The 3.1 to 3.3 millimetres (0.12 to 0.13 in) long pronotum is transversely trapezoidal and widens backwards. The 6.5 to 6.7 millimetres (0.26 to 0.26 in) long mesonotum shows a longitudinal crest in the middle. Typical of the genus, it is widest at the front and narrows towards the back. The 3.4 millimetres (0.13 in) long metanotum is much broader than long and more or less parallel-sided. The ridge beginning on the mesonotum also runs on the metanotum and splits at the end. Abdominal segments two to four gradually broaden backwards, while the fifth segment is approximately parallel-sided. The sixth to tenth segments gradually decrease in width.

The males are almost 33 millimetres (1.3 in) long and are much more elongated. They are colored with less contrast. On the 4.1 millimetres (0.16 in) long head, the supraantennas and the occipitals are also small, blunt spines. The vertex is raised and slightly elongated. The supraorbitals, the procoronals, and the anterior coronals present as small, blunt spines. The supraorbitals are slightly flattened laterally and are larger than the pro- and anterior coronals. The posterior coronals are about the same size as the anterior coronals. The lateral coronals are only indistinct and recognizable as tiny elevations. The antennae, consisting of 18 segments, are shorter than the front legs. The 2.4 millimetres (0.094 in) long pronotum, the 5.6 millimetres (0.22 in) long mesonotum and the 2.8 millimetres (0.11 in) long metanotum are similar in shape to those of the females, only significantly narrower. The abdomen is thinnest in the middle and is nowhere as wide as the metanotum.

The eggs are 3.1 millimetres (0.12 in) long, 2.8 millimetres (0.11 in) wide and 3.1 millimetres (0.12 in) high. They are almost spherical and black in color with tiny brown round spots.

== Distribution area and discovery ==
The previously known distribution area of Microrestes robustus is in the Vietnamese Hòa Bình, where the first female was collected in 1934, then not yet identified. Another female was collected in the same province in July 2016 in the Ngổ Luông Nature Reserve on the forest floor in the tropical evergreen rainforest. It was found on a narrow path running through a large, enclosed area of Araceae.

== Taxonomy ==
Joachim Bresseel and Jérôme Constant described the species 2020 as a type species of the also newly described genus Microrestes. The species name robustus means "firm, solid or robust" in Latin and refers to the general shape of this species. A female collected by the authors in the Ngổ Luông Nature Reserve between 25 and 30 July 2016 was deposited as a holotype of Microrestes robustus in the Museum of Natural Sciences in Brussels. Five paratypes go back to offspring of this animal. This is a male bred by Rob Krijns and two males and two females each bred by Daniel Dittmar. One pair of the latter is deposited in the Vietnamese National Museum for Nature in Hanoi, all others in the Museum of Natural Sciences in Brussels. In addition, Bresseel and Constant elevated a female from the Muséum national d'histoire naturelle in Paris, collected by A. De Cooman in 1934, to the status of a paratype.

== In captivity ==
A breeding stock that was successfully kept until 2020 went back to the female collected by Bresseel and Constant in July 2016. Up to the description of the species it was named Orestes sp. 'Ngo Luong' or as Dataminae sp. 'Ngo Luong'. The nymphs of both sexes that hatched from the eggs of the originally collected female were successfully raised by Krijns and Dittmar with various food plants such as Epipremnum and Arum, which belong to Araceae. But can also be fed with Hazel and Firethorn. Since 2020, no more nymphs have hatched from the laid eggs, so the species is no longer being bred.
