= Hainanphasma =

Scientific classification
- Kingdom: Animalia
- Phylum: Arthropoda
- Class: Insecta
- Order: Phasmatodea
- Superfamily: Bacilloidea
- Family: Heteropterygidae
- Subfamily: Dataminae
- Tribe: Datamini
- Genus: Hainanphasma; Ho, 2013

Type species
- Hainanphasma cristatum Ho, 2013

Species
- Hainanphasma cristatum; Hainanphasma diaoluoshanensis; Hainanphasma longiacutum; Hainanphasma longidentatum

Genus of stick insects

Hainanphasma is a genus of medium-sized, slender Phasmatodea species native to the Chinese island Hainan.

== Characteristics ==
The genus Hainanphasma is closely related to Orestes and Pylaemenes. The species are elongated and cylindrical and have slimmer and thinner antennae than other Datamini. Females reach a length of 42 to 52 millimetres (1.7 to 2.0 in), the previously known males reaches lengths of 35 to 42 millimetres (1.4 to 1.7 in). The punctulate occipital crest, which is extended backwards and is seen in both sexes, is considered typical of the genus. The posterior dorsal edges of the middle and hind femurs shows three distinct fin-like lamellae, the two posterior being larger than the anterior. Males have a distinct hump on the fourth and fifth segments of the abdomen. The eggs of this genus are distinctive and unique within the subfamily, somewhat resembling those of Planispectrum. The capsule is dark brown, almost oval, punctulate and covered with small elevated brownish spots. The micropylar plate is distinctly convex, laterally dilated and the posterior arms enclose the capsule but are not connected to each others. The rim of the micropylar plate is greatly elevated. The operculum is oval and punctulate. Medial it is conical and has elevated brownish spots.

== Distribution area ==
The range of the genus is the Chinese island of Hainan, where one species has been found in Jianfengling, Yinggeling, Wuzhishan, Huishan and Shangxi, the other one in Diaoluoshan. There they are widely distributed in most remaining primary forests areas.

== Taxonomy ==
George Ho Wai-Chun described the genus and its first two species in 2013 together with three species of other genera. The genus name refers to the locality of the two species. Hainanphasma cristatum (originally named as Hainanphasma cristata) was defined as type species, from which a total of 12 females, 11 males and 15 eggs were examined. All specimens are stored as type material. The female chosen as the holotype can be found in the collection of the Museum of Biology of Sun Yat-sen University in Guangdong, where five eggs, one female and three males paratypes are preserved. The remaining paratypes are deposited in the Shanghai Entomological Museum, in the collection of the Hong Kong Entomological Society, and in Ho's private collection. Most of these specimens were collected by Ho and found between June 2008 and July 2011. From Hainanphasma diaoluoshanensis only the female holotype collected by Ho on July 6, 2011 is known, which is also deposited in the collection of the Museum of Biology of the Sun Yat-sen University in Guangdong.

Valid species are:

- Hainanphasma cristatum Ho, 2013
- Hainanphasma diaoluoshanensis Ho, 2013
- Hainanphasma longiacutum Liu, Gu & Wang, 2025
- Hainanphasma longidentatum Liu, Gu & Wang, 2025
