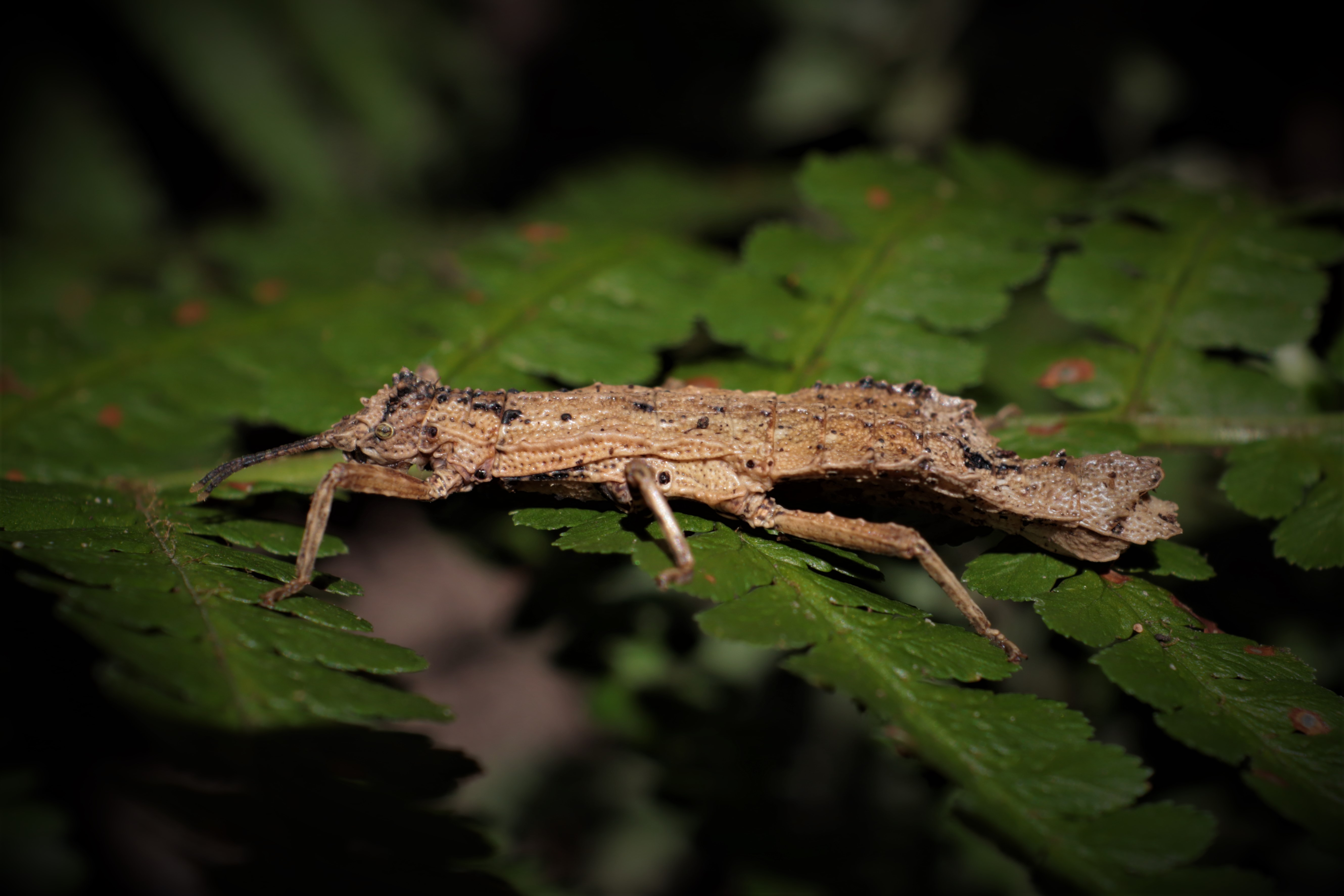
- Planispectrum hongkongense, female from the Tai Tam stock

Scientific classification
- Kingdom: Animalia
- Phylum: Arthropoda
- Class: Insecta
- Order: Phasmatodea
- Superfamily: Bacilloidea
- Family: Heteropterygidae
- Subfamily: Dataminae
- Tribe: Datamini
- Genus: Planispectrum; Rehn, J.A.G. & Rehn, J.W.H., 1939

Type species
- Planispectrum cochinchinensis (Redtenbacher, 1906)

Species
- List: Planispectrum bakiensis; Planispectrum bengalense; Planispectrum cochinchinensis; Planispectrum hainanensis; Planispectrum hongkongense; Planispectrum javanense; Planispectrum pusillus

Synonyms
- Platymorpha Redtenbacher, 1906; Platyphasma Uvarov, 1940

= Planispectrum =

Genus of stick insects

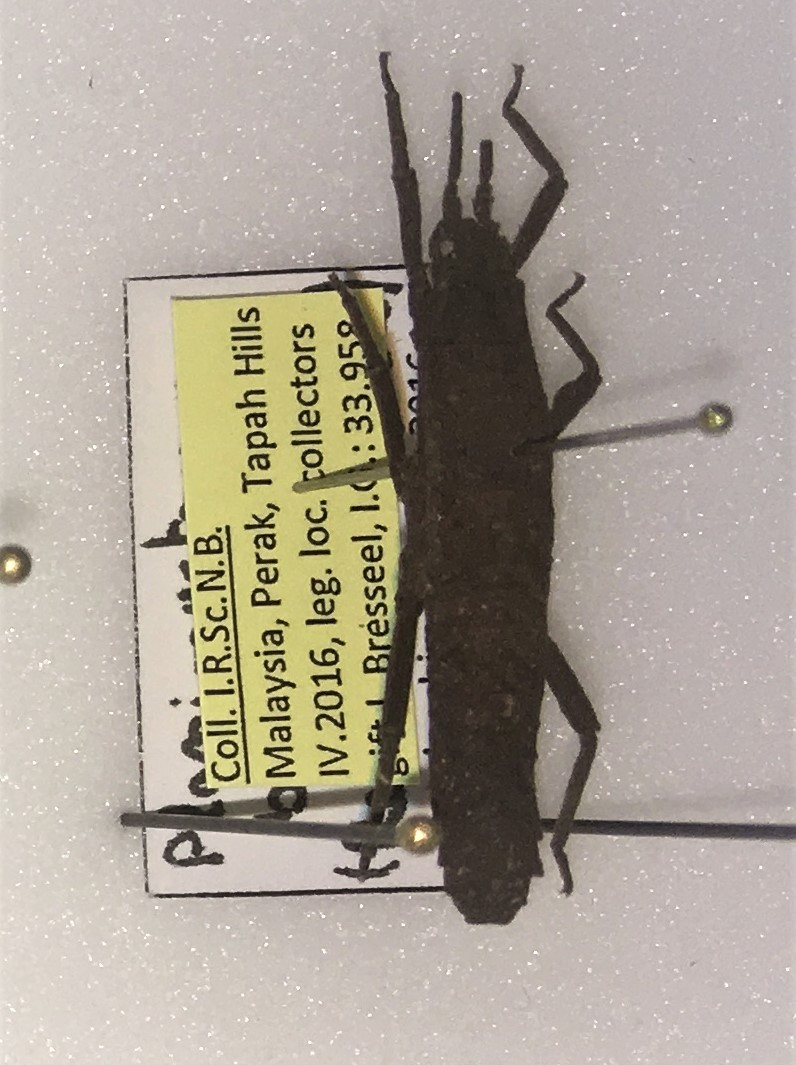
Planispectrum bengalense, female

The genus Planispectrum combines very small and compact species from Southeast Asia.

== Characteristics ==
Planispectrum is the smallest genus of the Dataminae. The males of the previously known species reach lengths of 18.5 to 26.4 millimetres (0.73 to 1.04 in), the females are 23.6 to 30.9 millimetres (0.93 to 1.22 in) long. In addition to the small size, the flat body and the very short antennae, which are hardly longer than the femura of the forelegs, are characteristic of the genus. In all species the antennae are shorter than the legs as a whole. The first antenna segment (scapus) is always toothed. Tubercles or teeth can be seen on the top of the head. The pronotum is trapezoidally widened posteriorly. The Metanotum is square. The margins of thorax and abdomen may be serrated. The meta pleura have no spines. The abdominal segments are very short and wide. The ventrally located subgenital plate of the female is blunt and no longer than the dorsaly located operculum. The same is swollen and rounded. It shows a rounded lip at the end. The legs are very short and have no teeth or thorns.

== Distribution area, way of life and reproduction ==
The distribution area of the genus extends from South China and Hong Kong over Vietnam, Malay Peninsula, Singapore, Sumatra and Borneo to Java. The representatives of the genus are extremely difficult to find and live close to the ground, where they usually hide under leaves lying on the ground. Only after heavy rain do they climb into the bushes to avoid the water.

== Taxonomy ==
- Datamini
  - - Epidares
    - Dares
  - - Planispectrum
    - - Pylaemenes species from Borneo
      - - Pylaemenes pui
        - - Pylaemenes coronatus
          - Orestes

Relationships of the genus Planispectrum within the Dataminae genera examined by genetic analysis so far

As early as 1906, Josef Redtenbacher described the first two species of the species listed today in Planispectrum in a genus specially established for this with Platymorpha cochinchinensis and Platymorpha bengalensis. Since Platymorpha is a genus of the leaf beetles (Chrysomelidae) already described in 1888, James Abram Garfield Rehn and his son John William Holman Rehn described the genus in 1939 new as Planispectrum. In relation to Phasmatodea, Platymorpha is therefore a senior synonym to Planispectrum. As type species they set Planispectrum cochinchinensis. Also the Russian entomologist Boris Uvarov noticed the synonymy of Platymorpha. Unaware of the renaming by Rehn and Rehn, he renamed the genus to Platyphasma in 1940. This name is therefore a junior synonym for the older name Planispectrum. A species also described by Redtenbacher in 1906 as Datames pusillus was transferred to the genus Planispectrum by Oliver Zompro in 2004. Zompro also described three other species. Two of them based on relatively freshly collected material and the third (Planispectrum javanense) after examining the type material of Planispectrum bengalensis based on a paralectotype. The last species to be described was Planispectrum hainanensis in 2008, initially in the genus Pylaemenes. It was transferred to Planispectrum by George Ho Wai-Chun in 2013.

Valid species are:

- Planispectrum bakiensis Zompro, 1998
- Planispectrum bengalense (Redtenbacher, 1906)
- Planispectrum cochinchinensis (Redtenbacher, 1906)
- Planispectrum hainanensis (Chen & He, 2008)
- Planispectrum hongkongense Zompro, 2004
- Planispectrum javanense Zompro, 2004
- Planispectrum pusillus (Redtenbacher, 1906)

In their work on the radiation and relationships within the Heteropterygidae, which was mainly based on genetic analysis and was published in 2021, Sarah Bank et al also examined a species of this genus with Planispectrum bengalensis. In the subfamily Dataminae, the genus forms a sister group with a clade formed by the genera Pylaemenes and Orestes.

== In captivity ==
Since 2020, a parthenogenetic stock of Planispectrum hongkongense has been in culture as the first representative of the genus in the terrariums of European enthusiasts. This traces back to a female collected in the Southern District of Hong Kong on November 20, 2019. The stock is referred to as Planispectrum hongkongense 'Tai Tam' after its exact location and is considered easy to keep and breed.
