= Woodlarkia =

Scientific classification
- Kingdom: Animalia
- Phylum: Arthropoda
- Class: Insecta
- Order: Phasmatodea
- Family: Heteropterygidae
- Subfamily: Dataminae
- Tribe: Datamini
- Genus: Woodlarkia; Günther, 1932
- Species: W. scorpionides

Binomial name
- Woodlarkia scorpionides (Montrouzier, 1855)

Synonyms
- Karabidion scorpionides Montrouzier, 1855; Eurycantha scorpionides (Montrouzier, 1855); Pylaemenes scorpionides (Montrouzier, 1855)

Genus of stick insects

Woodlarkia is a monotypic genus of stick insects native to Woodlark Island, containing Woodlarkia scorpionides as the only described species. Its systematic position is controversial, as Woodlark Island lies far outside the distribution area of the other representatives of the subfamily Dataminae, and neither illustrations nor type material of the species exist.

== Description ==
The narrow, roof-shaped, otherwise cylindrical, reddish-colored males are about 34 millimetres (1.3 in) long. Their antennae are almost as long as their body. They have two spines on the head and four on the pronotum. The mesonotum has five spines on each side and a forked spine on the upper side at the posterior edge. The metanotum has a transverse row of five spines. The fifth tergite of the abdomen has a single spine at the anterior edge. The femurs are lightly spined and not thickened.

The stocky females are similar in body shape to those of the genus Eurycantha, but only reach 50 millimetres (2.0 in) in length. They have a gray to reddish ground color with a brown longitudinal line. Their antennae are shorter. The head and pronotum also have two and four spines, respectively, like in males. The mesonotum bears four spines laterally and three flat, two-pointed spines. The metanotum has six spines above and two below. The five anterior abdominal tergites each have three, while the seventh and eighth each have only one centrally located spine. The femurs are lightly spined.

== Taxonomy ==
The species was described in 1855 by Xavier Montrouzier under the basionym Karabidion scorpionides. In the short species description, it is placed in the newly described genus Karabidion together with Karabidion horridum (now again Eurycantha horrida), Karabidion micracanthum (now Eurycantha micracantha), and Karabidion australe (now Dryococelus australis), also described by him in this work. This is now considered a synonym of Eurycantha. As early as 1859, John Obadiah Westwood transferred all species to the genus Eurycantha. In 1906, Josef Redtenbacher tentatively placed Eurycantha scorpionides in the genus Pylaemenes. In 1932, Klaus Günther described the genus Woodlarkia specifically for this species. Günther placed it in the Therameninae (today a synonym of Obriminae). At the same time, he considers classification with other taxa to be likely, for example, in the relationship with the genus Neopromachus, which is native to New Guinea, among other places. James Abram Garfield Rehn and his son John William Holman Rehn also mentioned in 1939 that the species could not be assigned due to missing material. To complete their work, they assigned it to the Datamini, which they established as a tribe within the Obriminae in their work. Since then, the systematic position of the species has been discussed several times but has not changed. Since all syntypes of this species are lost, a comparison with the type material is not possible. Due to the original classification in the genus Karabidion or Eurycantha, whose representatives are large and robust species and are characterized, among other things, by an ovipositor, the classification of the species in the otherwise small Datamini, which lacks an ovipositor, is considered unlikely. Furthermore, the named location of the species, Woodlark Island, lies east of New Guinea and thus far outside the usual distribution area of the Datamini. Classification in the related tribe Eurycanthini is considered more likely.
