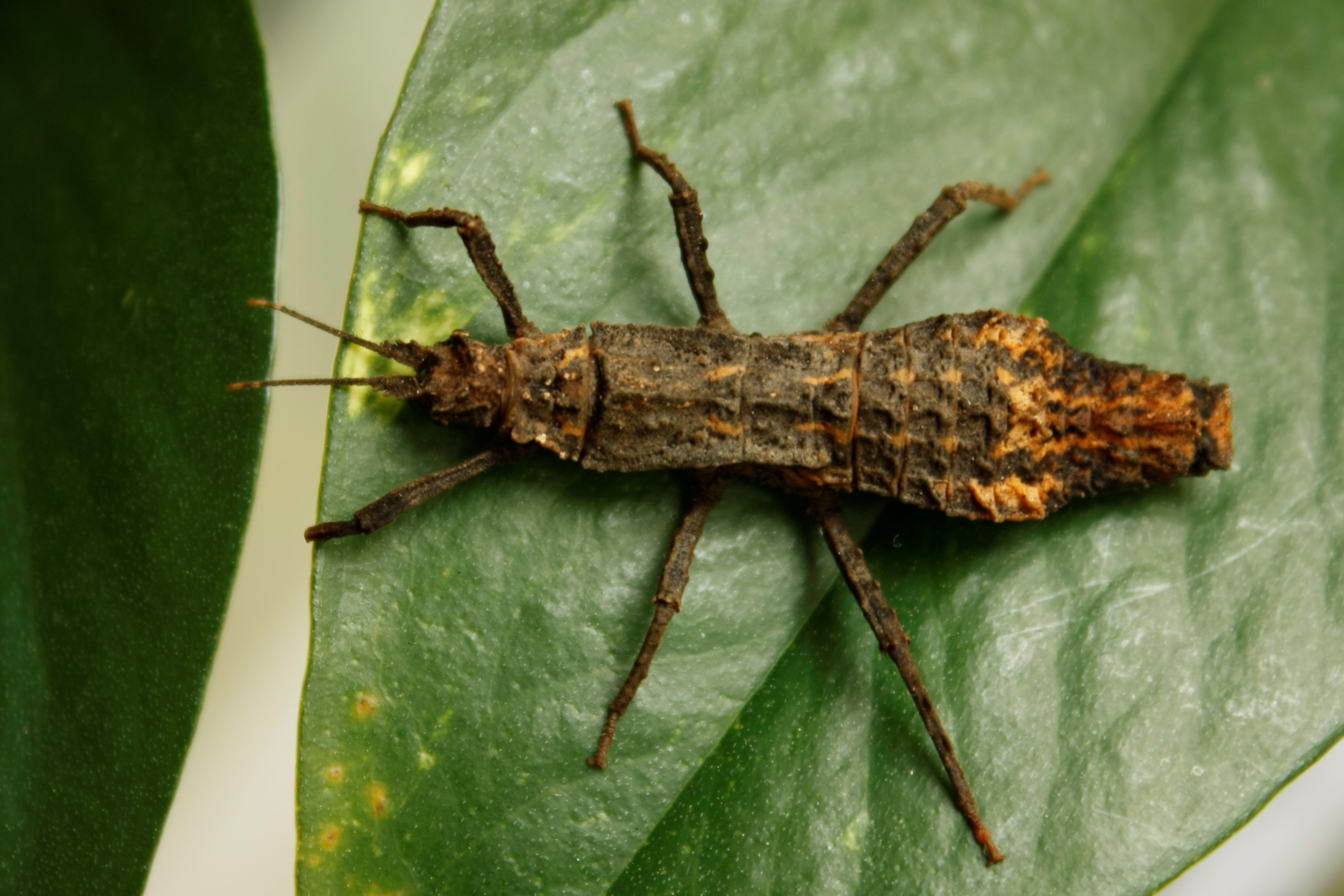
- Microrestes robustus, female

Scientific classification
- Kingdom: Animalia
- Phylum: Arthropoda
- Class: Insecta
- Order: Phasmatodea
- Superfamily: Bacilloidea
- Family: Heteropterygidae
- Subfamily: Dataminae
- Tribe: Datamini
- Genus: Microrestes; Bresseel & Constant, 2020

Type species
- Microrestes robustus Bresseel & Constant, 2020

Species
- Microrestes robustus; Microrestes trapezius
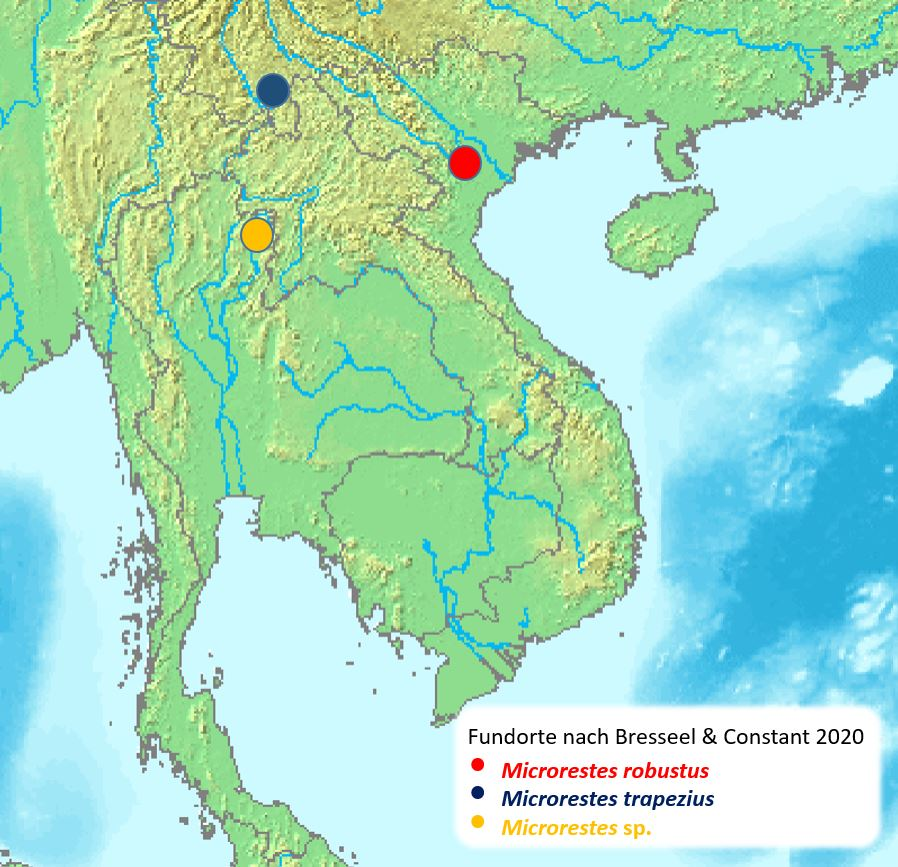
- Range of genus Microrestes

= Microrestes =

Genus of stick insects

The genus Microrestes combines relatively small and squat Phasmatodea species from continental Southeast Asia and South China.

== Characteristics ==
The representatives of the genus Microrestes remain particularly compared to their closest relatives, the representatives of the genera Orestes and Pylaemenes, relatively small. Females stay smaller than 4 cm, males smaller than 3.5 cm. A feature of the genus is the shape of the first two antenna segments, each of which has two teeth on the outer margin. In the larger basal segment (scapus) these are much more pronounced than in the second segment (pedicellus). The typical appearance is mainly due to the shape of the Pro- and Mesonotum. While the pronotum widens in a trapezoidal shape posteriorly, as in Pylaemenes, the mesonotum tapers in a trapezoidal shape posteriorly. The Metanotum is slightly wider at the back than at the front, unlike in Orestes species, which do not have a trapezoidal meso- and metanotum. The meso- and metanotum have thickened side margins in Microrestes and a pronounced edge along the middle. The number and arrangement of the sensory areas on the sternum, which has so far only been examined for the type species Microrestes robustus, is a specialty. While all the other Dataminae here have a pair of sensory fields on the prosternum and one on the profurcasternum behind it, with Microrestes (robustus) there are three fields on the prosternum. Since the field is also available on the profurcasternum, they are the only Heteropterygidae with four sensory fields. The anal segment of the abdomen of the female is more or less rectangular in plan view and not clearly tapered posteriorly. As with Orestes, it is flattened dorsally and has two different, tubercular, sloping edges. The eggs of the two species described so far are a good 3 mm long, 2.6 to 2.8 mm wide and about 3 mm high. In contrast to that of Orestes eggs, their surface is smooth and hairless. The three arms of the micropylar plate are very long. The two sides merge on the ventral side and the middle one reaches the lid on the dorsal side.

== Distribution area ==
The previously known origins of the Microrestes species are around the north of Laos in the neighboring countries. Microrestes trapezius was found in 2015 in the rainforest of Xishuangbanna in the Chinese border region to Laos and Myanmar at an altitude of 500 to 800 m. Microrestes robustus was collected in July 2016 in the Ngổ Luông Nature Reserve of the Vietnamese Hòa Bình Province east of Laos. In the Thai Nan Province, K. Jiaranaisakul also found the male of a third species in July 2016 in the Doi Phu Kha National Park, which he photographed in detail.

== Taxonomy ==
The name Microrestes is a Portmanteau and as such a combination of the Greek “Micro” (Ancient Greek: μικρός mikrós = 'small') and “orestes”, the name of one other Dataminae genus. It refers to the small size of the species and their close relationship to the genus Orestes. Joachim Bresseel & Jérôme Constant described the genus in 2020 on the basis of the newly described species Microrestes robustus, which was established as a type species. They also transferred a species described in 2016 as Pylaemenes trapezius by George Ho Wai-Chun to this genus. Valid species are therefore:

- Microrestes robustus Bresseel & Constant, 2020
- Microrestes trapezius (Ho, 2016)

A female they collected in the Ngổ Luông nature reserve in July 2016 was deposited as holotype of Microrestes robustus in the Museum of Natural Sciences in Brussels. Further paratypes from the offspring of this species by Rob Krijns and Daniel Dittmar are deposited both there and in the Vietnam National Museum of Nature in Hanoi. Farther, Bresseel and Constant raised a female from the Muséum national d'histoire naturelle in Paris collected as early as 1934 to the status of a paratype.

In addition to the two species described, Bresseel and Constant also mention and show the third Microrestes representative found and photographed by Jiaranaisakul in Thailand. This species, previously only known from the pictures of a male that were also published, was not described due to the lack of a specimen copy.
