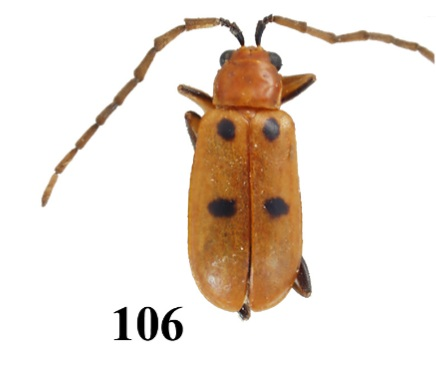

Scientific classification
- Kingdom: Animalia
- Phylum: Arthropoda
- Clade: Pancrustacea
- Class: Insecta
- Order: Coleoptera
- Suborder: Polyphaga
- Infraorder: Cucujiformia
- Family: Chrysomelidae
- Genus: Platymorpha
- Species: P. variegata

Binomial name
- Platymorpha variegata Jacoby, 1888

= Platymorpha variegata =

Species of beetle

Platymorpha variegata is a species of beetle of the family Chrysomelidae. It is found in Mexico.
