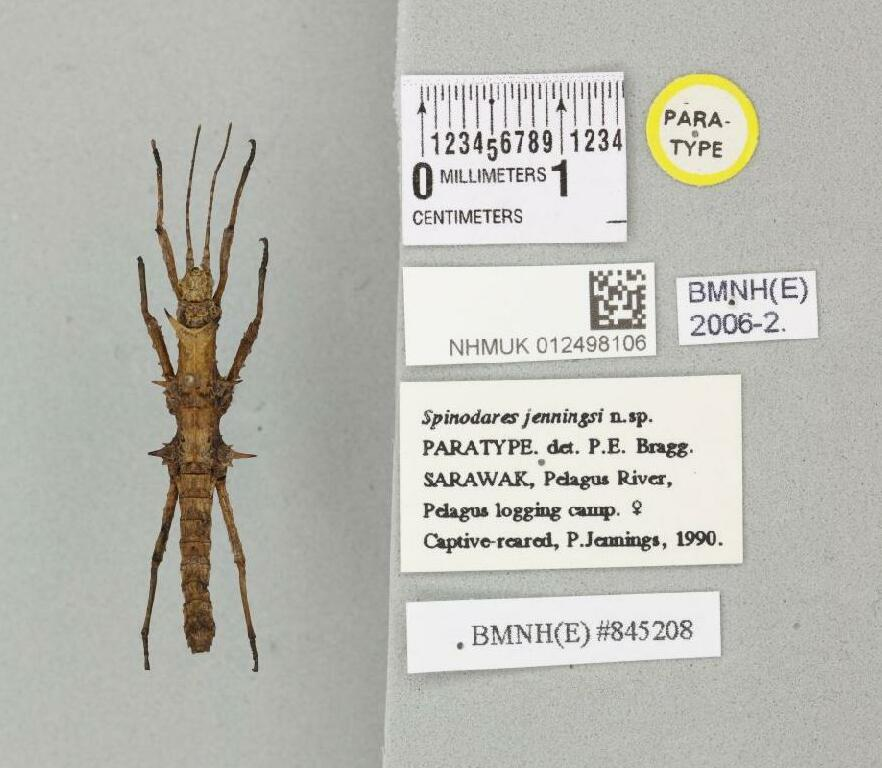
- Spinodares jenningsi, female paratype

Scientific classification
- Domain: Eukaryota
- Kingdom: Animalia
- Phylum: Arthropoda
- Class: Insecta
- Order: Phasmatodea
- Family: Heteropterygidae
- Tribe: Datamini
- Genus: Spinodares; Bragg, 1998
- Species: S. jenningsi

Binomial name
- Spinodares jenningsi Bragg, 1998

= Spinodares =

Genus of stick insects

Spinodares is a monotypic stick insect genus endemic to Borneo, containing Spinodares jenningsi as the only valid species.

== Description ==
The females reach 42.5 to 46 millimetres (1.67 to 1.81 in) in length. The body and legs are colored medium to dark brown. Lighter shades of brown are mainly found in raised areas of the body. In the Pelagus River specimens, an orange-brown line is described running along the 8.5 millimetres (0.33 in) long meso-, the metanotum, the median segment, which together are about 6.5 millimetres (0.26 in) long, and the anterior half of the abdomen. This line was not observed in the females from Mulu. The body is almost parallel-sided, narrowing slightly only in the posterior half of the abdomen. A central ridge (carina) runs across the mesotum, metanotum and abdomen. Near it, the otherwise wrinkled and warty upper surface of the body is relatively smooth. The underside of the body is slightly bumpy in places. On the almost square, 3.5 millimetres (0.14 in) long head are large anterior occipital. The 17.5 millimetres (0.69 in) long antennae consist of 25 segments. The mesonotum is three times longer than the pronotum and almost rectangular. A rising area at the front edge leads to two extremely large spines at the front. They point forward and their tips are almost level with the concave anterior edge of the pronotum. There are two supraoxal spines on the mesopleura, one small, mediolateral, and one very large above. There are two tubercles at its base. Two pairs of large tubercles are on the posterior edge of the mesonotum, surrounded laterally by three to four smaller ones. The metapleura bear a very large supraoxal spine between two very small ones. The median segment is almost indistinguishable from metanotum. There the longitudinal crest branches into a pair of large, posterior tubercles. In the case of abdominal segments two to four and six and seven, the longitudinal crest divides in front of their posterior edge in order to unite again at the edge itself and form a triangular structure there. On the fifth segment, this structure is greatly enlarged, forming a three-lobed area. At the posterior edge of the eighth segment, the longitudinal crest forms a small triangular pyramid.

The only male documented to date measures 324 millimetres (12.8 in). A lighter line along the middle of the body on an otherwise brown coloration was also described in this male. The head is 3.5 times as long as it is wide. The supratennals are formed as spines. On the back of the head is a crown consisting of three coronal spines on both sides. The anterior coronals are the smallest and point forward, the middle ones are prominent and thick, while the posterior ones are long and pointed. On the pronotum there are short spikes in front behind the anterior edge, more in the middle and a third pair just before the rear edge. Two large triangular spines are present on the mesonotum in front, the tips of which are connected by a concave bulge. The light midline is elevated and extends from the mesonotum through the metanoum to far into the abdomen. On the mesonotum, this divides backwards and is surrounded by a triangular area. On the metanotum it is indistinctly forked backwards. On the second to fourth abdominal segments it is bifurcated forwards and backwards, with the anterior bifurcation becoming increasingly indistinct from segment to segment. The rear furcation is sharply raised on the fifth segment and progressively round rather than triangular on the sixth through ninth.

The eggs are dark brown, cuboid and unique among the Datamini due to the three concave dents on both lateral sides. With a height of 2.2 millimetres (0.087 in) and a width of 1.6 millimetres (0.063 in), they are 3.7 millimetres (0.15 in) long and twice as long as they are wide. The surface is covered with numerous hairs, most numerous in the pole and lid area, while very few are found on the lateral surfaces. The lid is oval.

== Distribution area ==
Spinodares jenningsi is documented from several localities scattered across Borneo. For example, females were found in a logging camp on the Pelagus River and near the Batang Baleh River. Both rivers flow into the Rajang River and are located in the central part of the Malaysian state of Sarawak. Further females have been found in Mulu in northern Sarawak. A male was collected at Bukit Raya at an altitude of about 1,400 metres (4,600 ft) in the Schwaner mountain range in the north of the Indonesian province Central Kalimantan.

== Taxonomy ==
Philip Edward Bragg described the genus Spinodares together with its only species Spinodares jenningsi in 1998. The genus name is a combination of the name of the similar genus Dares and "Spino" cause of the large spines by which this genus differs from Dares. The holotype of Spinodares jenningsi is a female found in a logging camp on the River Pelagus and deposited at the Natural History Museum in London. It was collected on August 8, 1990, along with two other females and one female nymph. All specimens survived a few weeks in the UK. One female survived at Paul Jennings for about one year and laid eggs during this time, from which nymphs hatched, which were fed with bramble leaves. Some of them could be reared to the subadult instar. The originally collected specimens, as well as eight nymphs from Jennings offspring and some eggs laid by the holotype are deposited as paratypes in the Natural History Museum, the Oxford University Museum of Natural History, the Naturalis Biodiversity Center in Leiden and in Jennings' private collection. The species name was chosen in honor of Paul Jennings. In 2004, Oliver Zompro described the previously unknown male based on a specimen from the Zoological Museum in Hamburg that had originally been stored in alcohol. It was collected by H. Winkler between July 18 and 23, 1924 on Bgatla Raja (today Bukit Raya), the highest mountain in the Schwaner mountain range.
