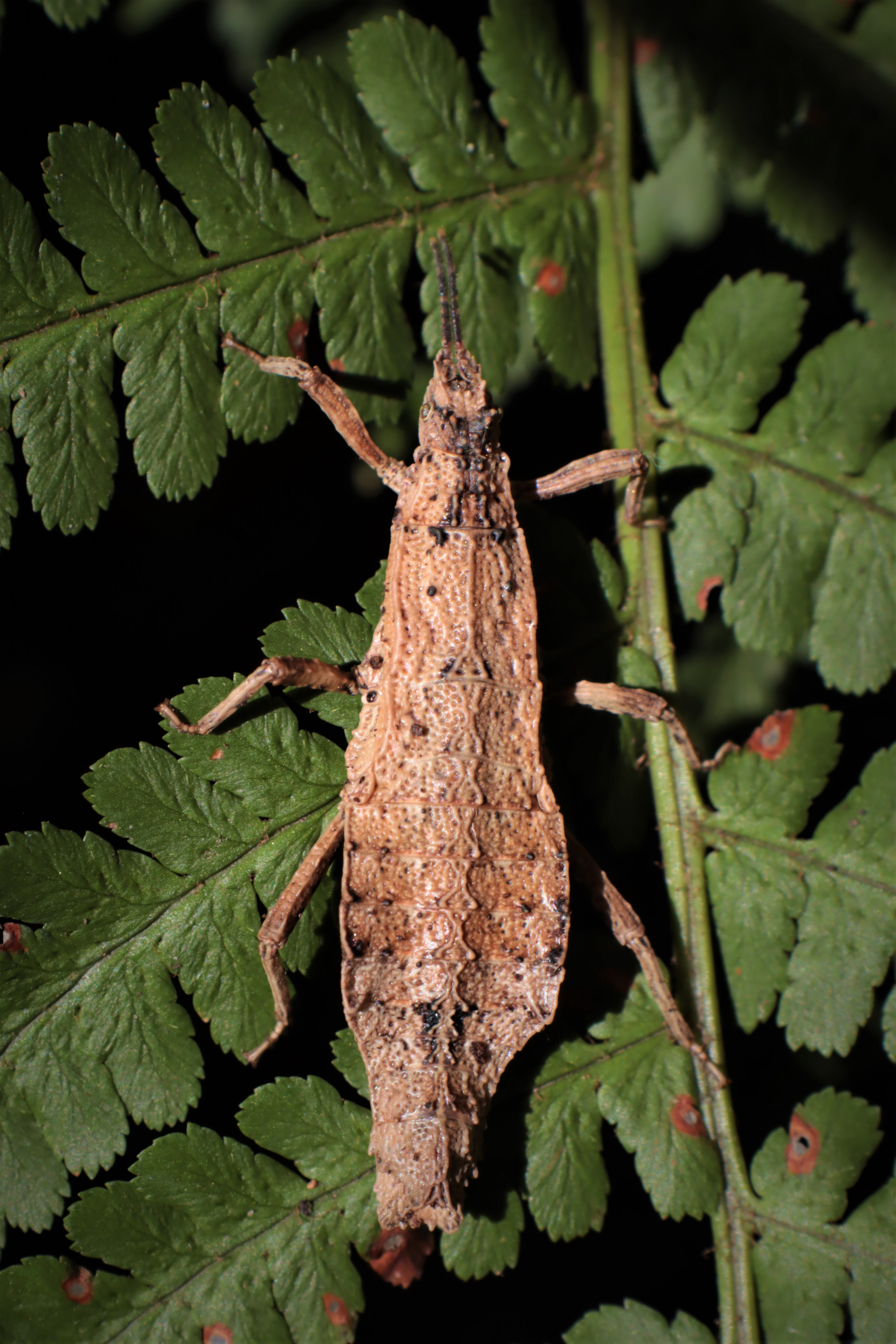
- Planispectrum hongkongense, female of stock from Tai Tam

Scientific classification
- Domain: Eukaryota
- Kingdom: Animalia
- Phylum: Arthropoda
- Class: Insecta
- Order: Phasmatodea
- Family: Heteropterygidae
- Subfamily: Dataminae
- Tribe: Datamini
- Genus: Planispectrum
- Species: P. hongkongense

Binomial name
- Planispectrum hongkongense Zompro, 2004

= Planispectrum hongkongense =

Species of stick insect

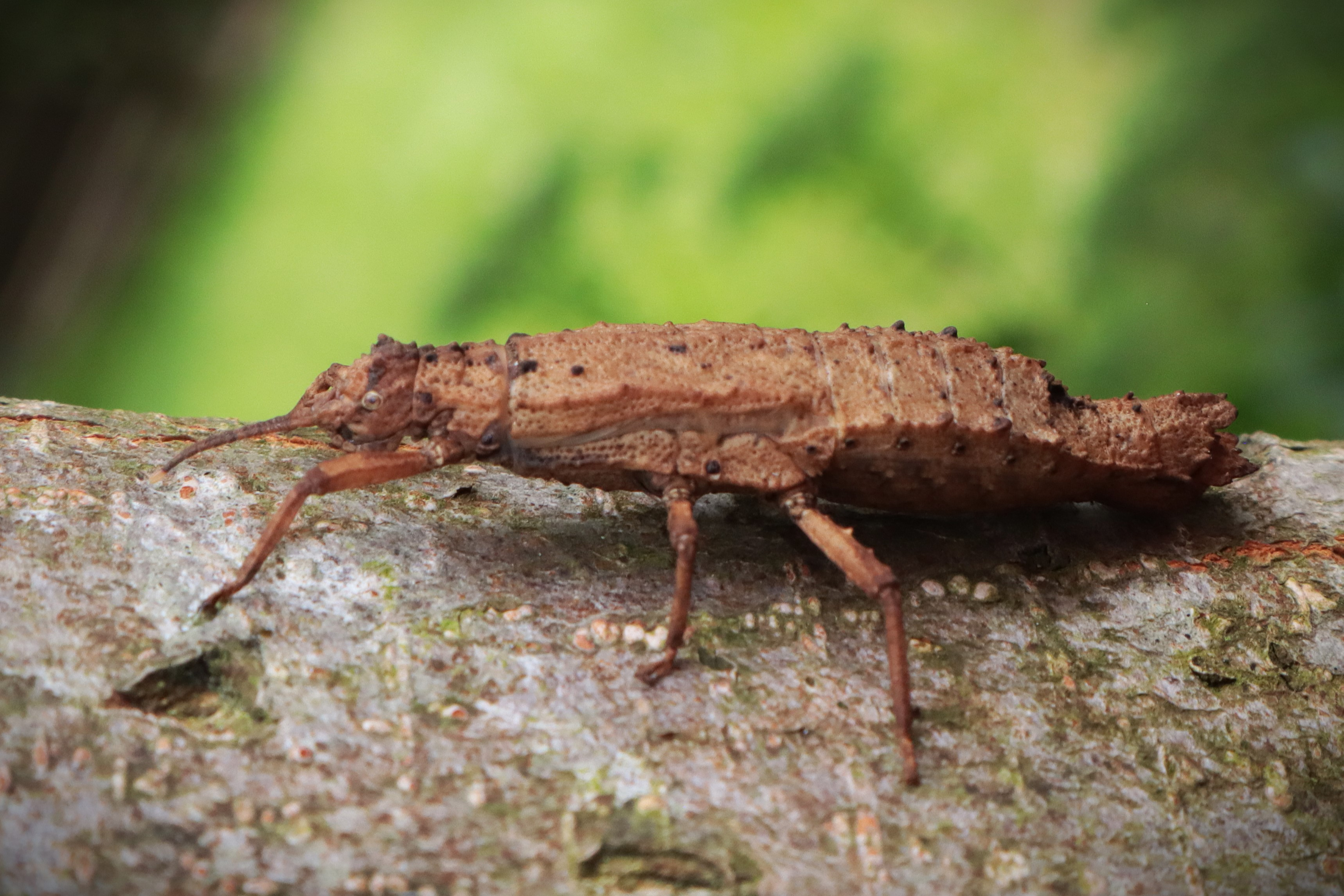
Lateral view of a female of the breeding stock from Tai Tam

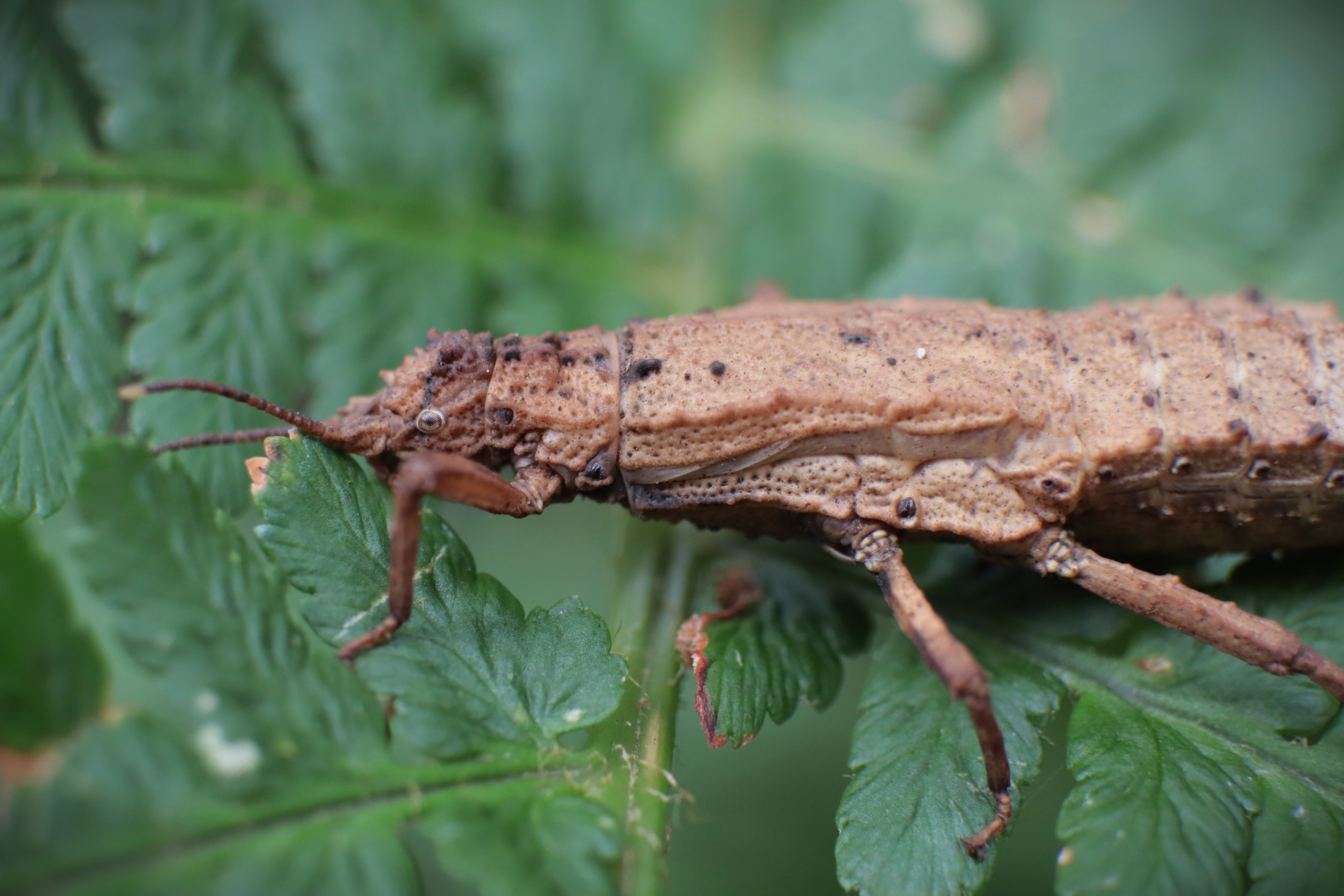
Portrait of a female of the breeding stock from Tai Tam

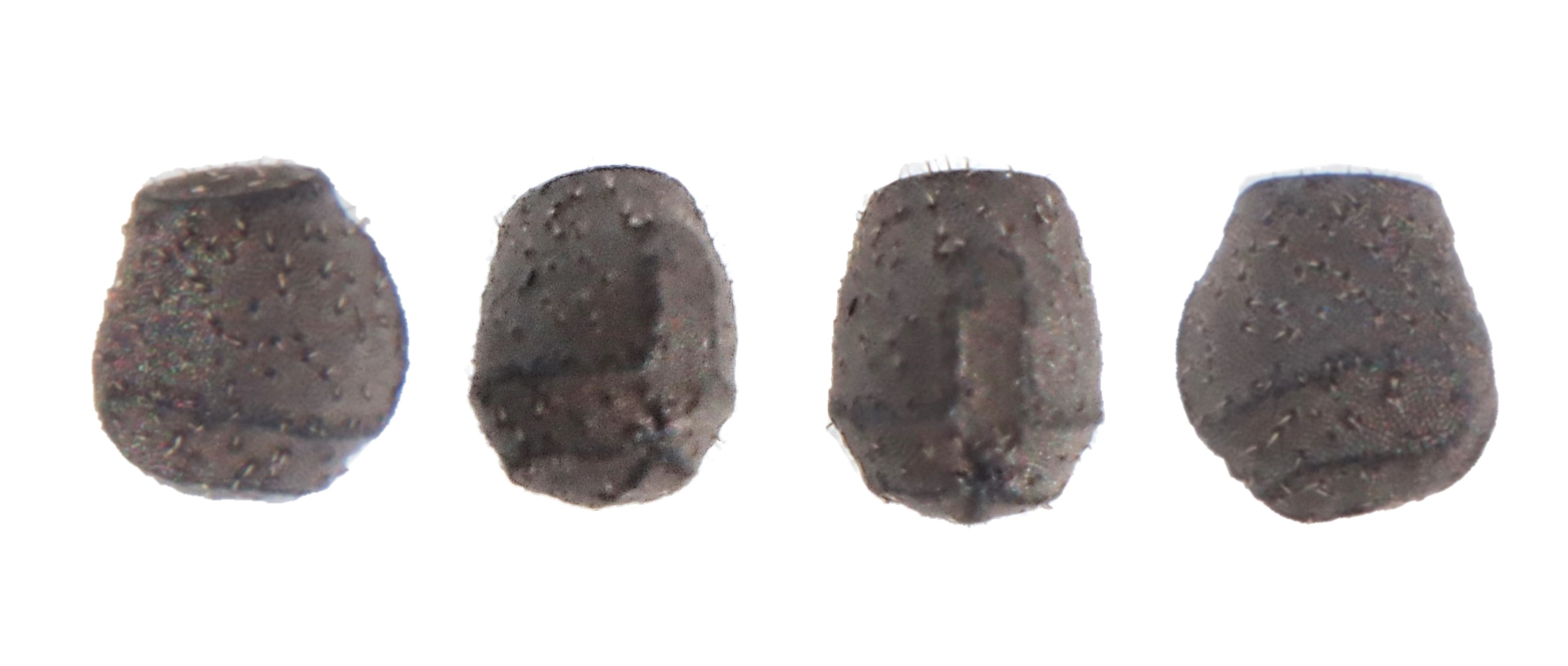
Eggs in lateral, semidorsal, dorsal and lateraler view

Planispectrum hongkongense is a Phasmatodea species native to Hong Kong, of which only females are known so far.

== Characteristics ==
With length about 30 millimetres (1.2 in), the females of Planispectrum hongkongense are among the larger representatives of the genus. Due to the laterally flattened abdomen, which is significantly wider than the thorax, the species is considered easy to identify. It can be distinguished from the closely related Planispectrum hainanense by the hairless legs, which have their middle and hind femurs only slightly widened fin-like lamellae on the front and rear area. The ones from P. hainanense are clearly fin-like there and with short brownish setae at the legs. The anal segment of P. honkongense is slightly emarginate, that of P. hainanensis is strongly emarginate. The 3.7 millimetres (0.15 in) long head is significantly longer than wide. The supra antennals located there are pointed and connected to the interorbitals by a raised crest. The three pre occipitals become larger towards the rear. The posterior occipitals are prominent. The lateral coronals are clearly visible. The antennae consist of about 20 segments, some of which are indistinctly separated from one another. Of the 30 millimetres (1.2 in) total length, the pronotum accounts for 2.7 millimetres (0.11 in), the mesonotum 5.8 millimetres (0.23 in), the metanotum 2.8 millimetres (0.11 in) and the median segment 1.8 millimetres (0.071 in). The first to fourth abdominal segments increasingly wide. The fourth segment is the widest. The fifth segment has the width of the third. The sixth to tenth segments increasingly narrow.

== Taxonomy and distribution area ==
Oliver Zompro described Planispectrum hongkongense in 2004 together with two other Planispectrum species using a female and an egg taken from this. The female, which like the egg is in the collection of the Natural History Museum of Geneva, was declared the holotype. It was collected on December 2, 1988 by B. Hauser at an altitude of 180 to 380 metres (590 to 1,250 ft) and is from the Tai Mo Shan Country Park. The species name refers to where the specimen was found. In addition to the holotype, another female is mentioned, which was photographed in the collection of the University of Hong Kong without location information. George Ho Wai-Chun examined further eleven females and nine eggs. These were mostly collected by himself between 2006 and 2013 in Southern District (in Aberdeen and Violet Hill) and Tai Po District (in Ma Wo, Tai Po Kau and Ng Tung Chai), Sha Tin District (in Shing Mun), Sai Kung District (in Tsiu Hang) and Islands District (at Tai Tung Shan on Lantau Island).

== In captivity ==
A parthenogenetic stock of Planispectrum hongkongense has been in breeding in Europe since 2020. it goes back to a female that the Czech Luděk Šulda in the Tai Tam Country Park of Hong Kong took away on November 20, 2019, while he was looking for ants. Arriving in the Czech Republic, he tried to identify the species. After it was initially thought to be a representative of the genus Orestes because of a bad photo, Pavel Potocký identified it in April 2020 using better pictures as a representative of another genus, after which Šulda sent the adult female Potocký. When the female died in July 2020, she had laid about 30 eggs, from which about 25 nymphs hatched, most of which were passed on to different breeders. Using adult females of the first offspring generation, Potocký determined the species 2021 and named the breeding line after the origin as Planispectrum hongkongense 'Tai Tam '.

Planispectrum hongkongense is easy to keep and to breed. The nymphs grow very slowly and, like the imagos too, they feed on leaves of bramble or other Rosaceae.
