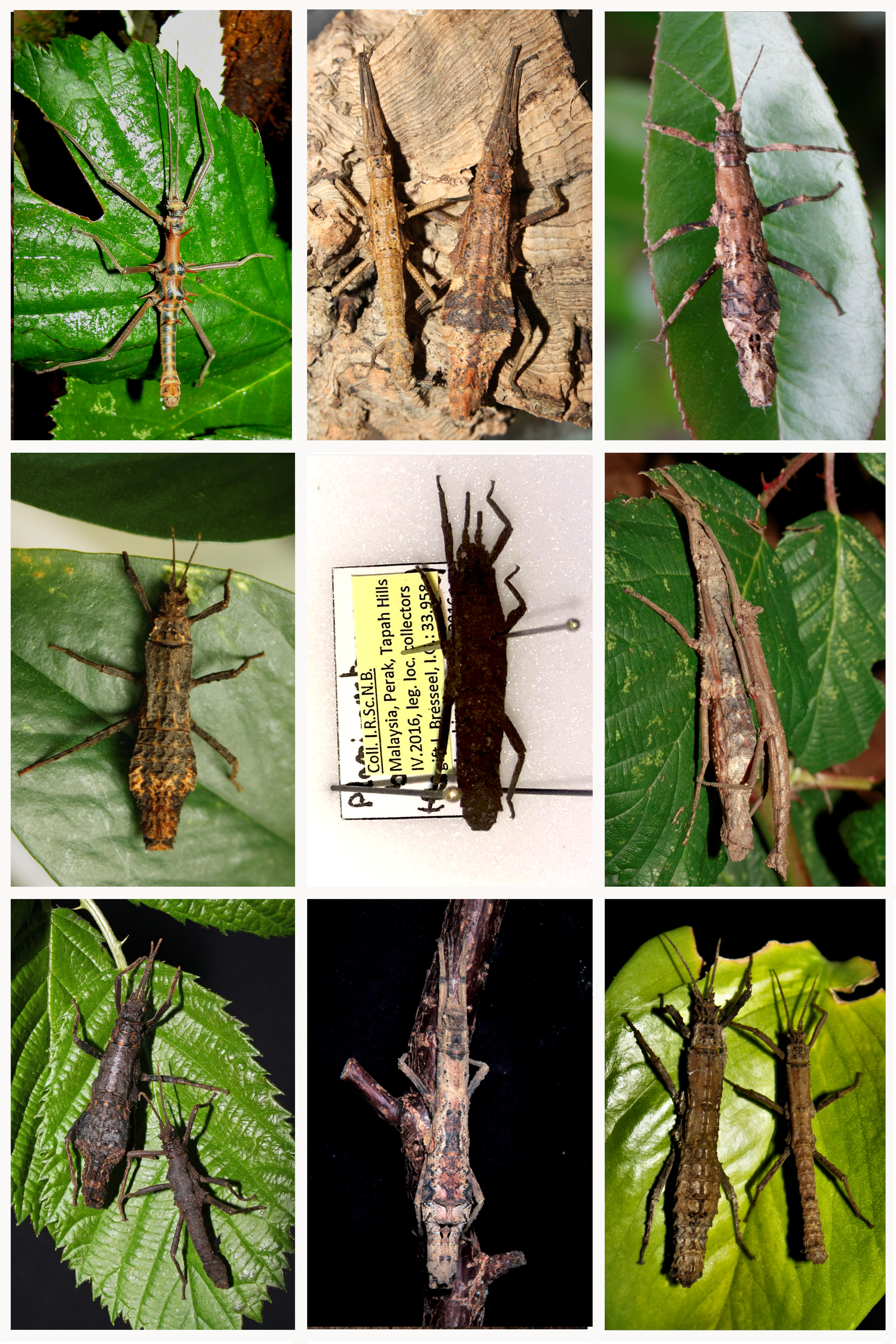
- Different species of Datamini

Scientific classification
- Kingdom: Animalia
- Phylum: Arthropoda
- Clade: Pancrustacea
- Class: Insecta
- Order: Phasmatodea
- Family: Heteropterygidae
- Subfamily: Dataminae; Rehn, J.A.G. & Rehn, J.W.H., 1939
- Tribe: Datamini; Rehn, J.A.G. & Rehn, J.W.H., 1939

Genera
- List: Dares; Epidares; Hainanphasma; Microrestes; Orestes; Planispectrum; Pylaemenes; Spinodares; Woodlarkia
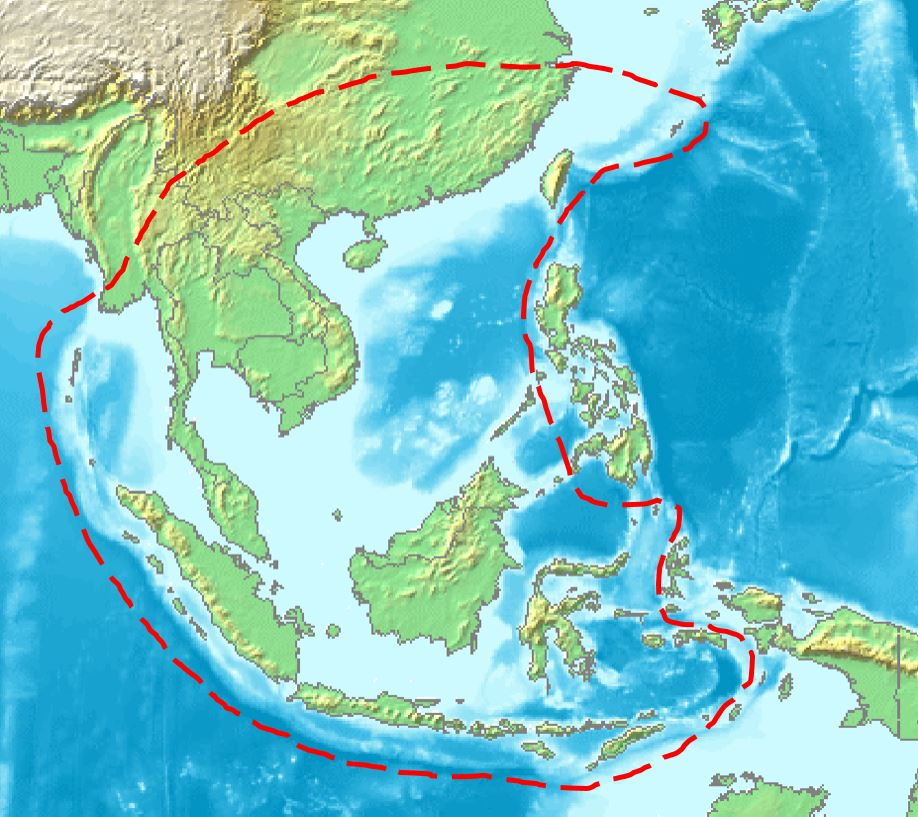
- Range of the Datamini

= Datamini =

Datamini Temporal range: 45–0 Ma Eocene to present

Tribe of stick insects

Datamini is the only tribe within the subfamily of the Dataminae from the order of the Phasmatodea. The representatives of this subfamily are on average not as large as those of the other two subfamilies belonging to the family of Heteropterygidae.

== Description ==
Datamini species remain relatively small for phasmids. In females, the body length varies between 2.5 and 6 cm, depending on the species. The males remain somewhat smaller with a body length of less than 2 to a maximum of 5 cm. The presence of sensory areas, which is considered to be the autapomorphic characteristic of the Heteropterygidae, is fully developed in the Dataminae. With them there is a pair of these sensory fields on the Prosternum and a third in the middle behind it on the so-called (Pro-) Furcasternit. All species are wingless in both sexes. The females lack the secondary ovipositor typically developed in the other subfamilies at the end of the abdomen. Their abdomen ends bluntly. In adult females, the abdomen is widened and significantly increased towards the middle due to egg production. Males have a cylindrical central abdomen area, which is thinnest here. Pointed spines can be found in many species, especially in the males. Alternatively, the body can be covered by wart-like tubercles. The latter is more common in females. Most species are monochrome beige, brown or black-brown in color or patterned in these colors.

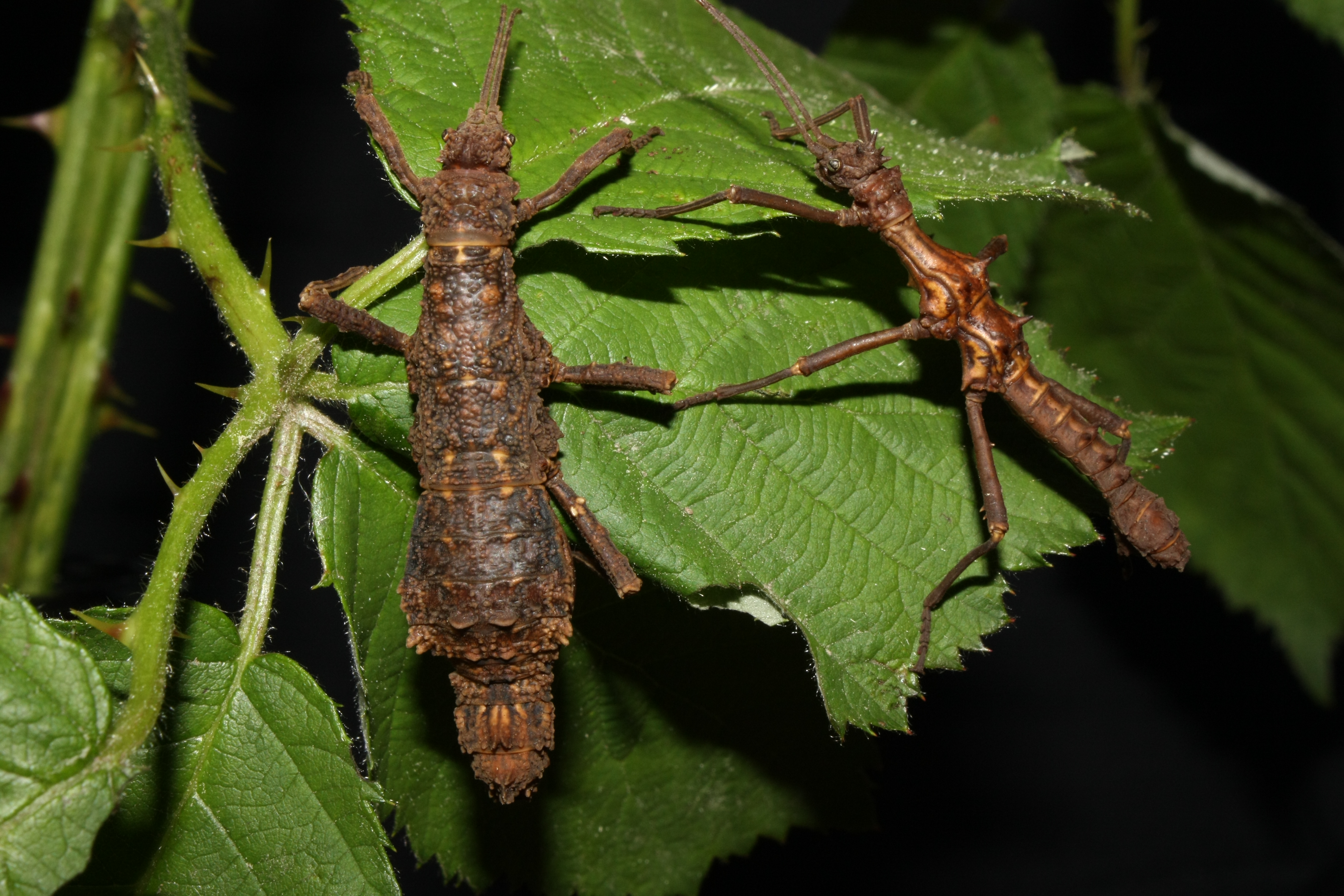
Dares validispinus, pair

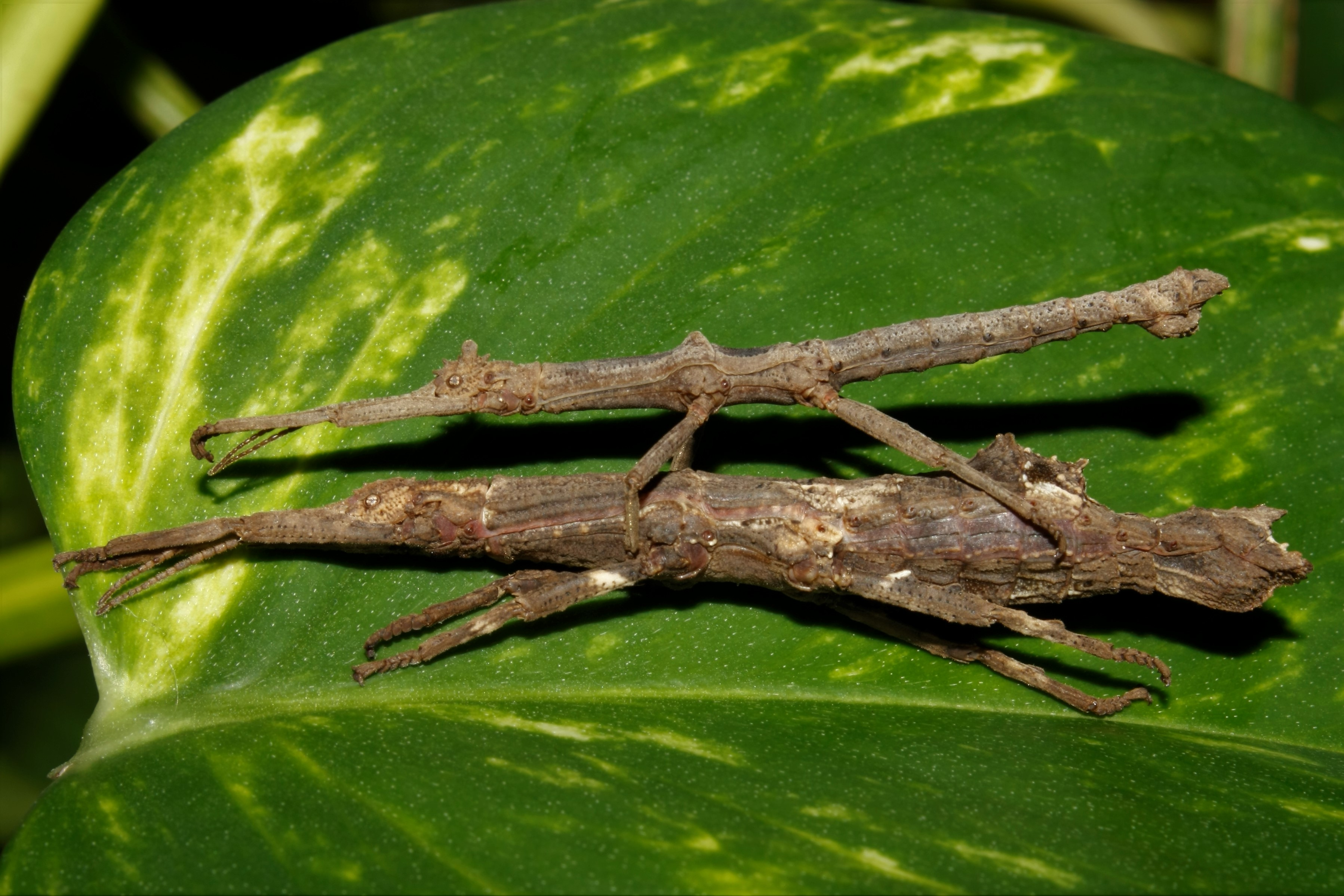
Orestes draegeri, pair

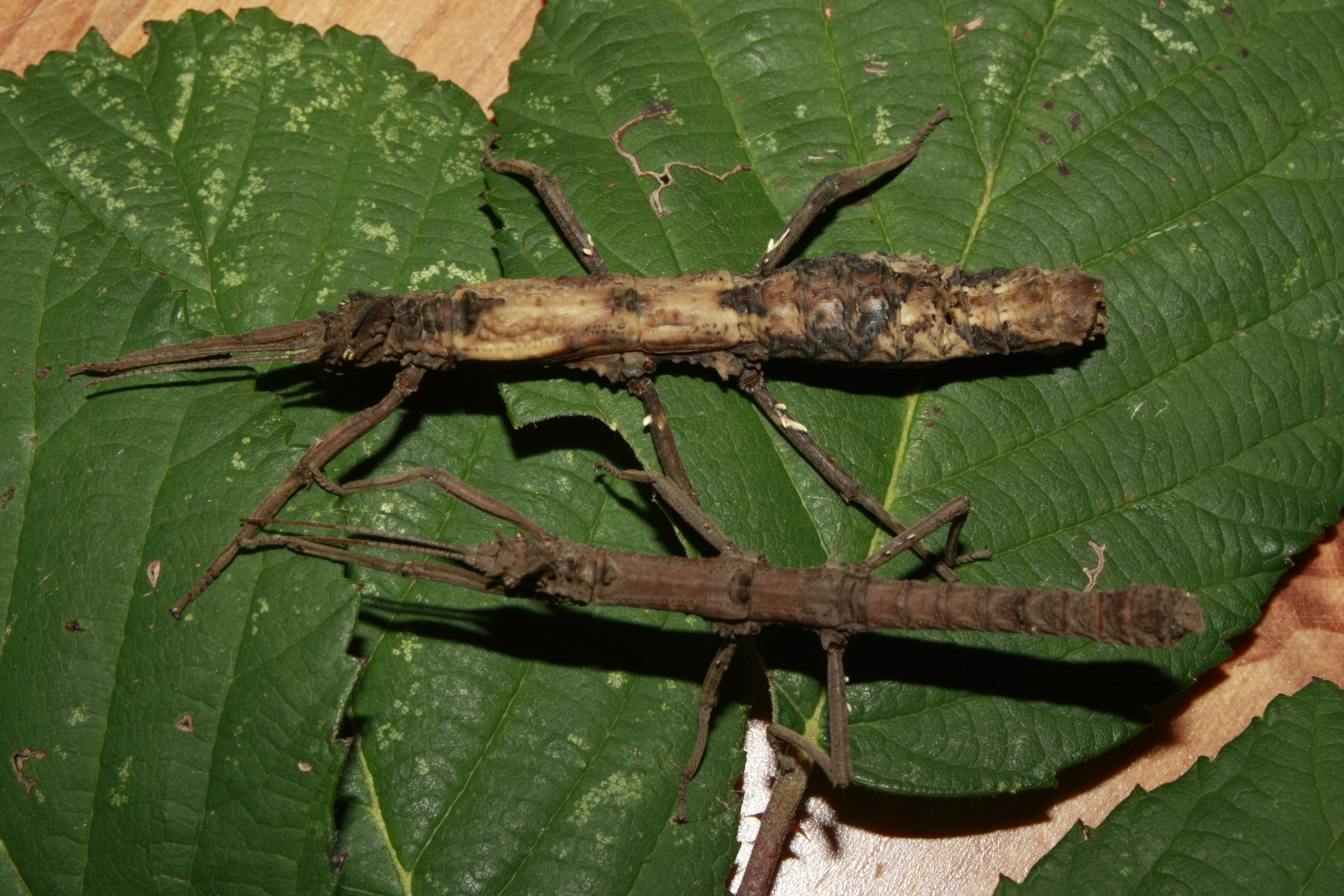
Pylaemenes mitratus 'Kota Bharu', pair

== Distribution and way of life ==
The range area of the Dataminae covers large parts of Southeast Asia. It extends in the north over the eastern Myanmar, includes Thailand, Laos, Cambodia, Vietnam and in South China the provinces Yúnnán, Guizhou, Hunan, Jiangxi and Zhejiang partially, as well as Hainan, Guangdong, Fujian and the Special Administrative Regions Hong Kong and Macau, as well as the autonomous region Guangxi. To the east it includes the Okinawa Islands and Taiwan, then somewhat following the Huxley line so that Palawan is included, but not the Calamian Islands. The Dataminae are also represented on the Moluccas islands Buru and Seram and all Lesser and Greater Sunda Islands. In the west they can be found on the entire Malay Peninsula and the Andamans.

The way of life of the nocturnal animals, like the defense strategy, is geared towards mimetic. The animals often move slowly or not at all when touched for a long time. During the day, the phasmids usually hide in the leaves and at the foot of plants. To eat, they often only climb a few centimeters on the food plants. The females usually lay only a few, but relatively large eggs on or in the ground. With Epidares and some Orestes species it was observed that they prepare a hollow in the ground with the front legs, then the abdomen quickly over the front body let it fold, squeezing out an egg. This is catapulted forward, caught with the antennas and rolled over them into the trough, where it is then covered with earth by using the forelegs. It takes between two and six months for hatching. The nymphs always grow very slowly. Adults can live between one and five years.

== Taxonomy ==
=== Systematic background ===
The names of the subfamily and tribe go back to the genus Datames established by Carl Stål in 1875, which he named after the Persian officials and general Datames. James Abram Garfield Rehn established in 1904 with Datames oileus described by John Obadiah Westwood in 1859, the earliest described species in the genus at that time as type species. In 1939, J.A.G. Rehn and his son John William Holman Rehn divided the genera that had previously been part of the subfamily Obriminae into the tribes Obrimini and Datamini. Klaus Günther transferred these two tribes to the subfamily Heteropteryginae in 1953. In 1998 it turned out that the type species Datames oileus of the genus Pylaemenes is to be assigned. So the genus Datames synonymized, while the name for the tribes was retained. Oliver Zompro raised the subfamily Heteropteryginae in 2004 to the rank of a family and the tribe Datamini to the rank of a subfamily.

=== Inner systematics ===
- Datamini
  - - Epidares
    - Dares
  - - Planispectrum
    - - - Pylaemenes sp. 'Kubah'
        - - Pylaemenes sepilokensis 'Sepilok'
          - Pylaemenes sepilokensis 'Tawau'
      - - Pylaemenes pui
        - - Pylaemenes coronatus
          - Orestes

Relationships of the examined Dataminae species by Sarah Bank et al. (2021)

In their work on the spread of the Heteropterygidae, published in 2021 and based mainly on genetic analysis Sarah Bank et al., showed among other things, the relationships within the family. In the Dataminae all examined genera except for Pylaemenes were confirmed as monophyletic groups. The investigated Pylaemenes species can be found in the immediate vicinity of each other in the cladogram, but do not form a common clade.
The species of Subfamily Dataminae, which at the same time all belong to their only tribe Datamini, are divided into the following genera:

- Dares Stål, 1875
- Epidares Redtenbacher, 1906
- Hainanphasma Ho, 2013
- Microrestes Bresseel & Constant, 2020
- Orestes Redtenbacher, 1906
- Planispectrum Rehn, J. A. G. & Rehn, J. W. H., 1939
- Pylaemenes Stål, 1875
- Spinodares Bragg, 1998

Klaus Günther described with Woodlarkia in 1932 another genus within the later subfamily Dataminae. Its only representative, Woodlarkia scorpionides, was described by Xavier Montrouzier in 1855 as Karabidion scorpionides. As early as 1859 the species was transferred to the genus Eurycantha by Westwood. Josef Redtenbacher transferred them to the genus Pylaemenes in 1906. Since all syntypes of these from the island Woodlark are missing, a comparison with the type material is not possible. Due to the original assignment and the location east of the island New Guinea lying very far outside the rest of the distribution area of the subfamily, it is assumed that the species cannot be assigned to the Datamini.

=== Genera with species ===
Image	Genus	Species
	Dares Stål, 1875	Dares breitensteini (Redtenbacher, 1906); Dares kinabaluensis Bragg, 1998; Dares mjobergi Bragg, 1998; Dares multispinosus Bragg, 1998; Dares murudensis Bragg, 1998; Dares navangensis Bragg, 1998; Dares philippinensis Bragg, 1998; Dares planissimus Bragg, 1998; Dares ulula (Westwood, 1859); Dares validispinus Stål, 1875; Dares verrucosus Redtenbacher, 1906
	Epidares Redtenbacher, 1906	Epidares nolimetangere (de Haan, 1842)
	Hainanphasma Ho, 2013	Hainanphasma cristata Ho, 2013; Hainanphasma diaoluoshanensis Ho, 2013; Hainanphasma longiacutum Liu, Gu & Wang, 2025; Hainanphasma longidentatum Liu, Gu & Wang, 2025
	Orestes Redtenbacher, 1906	Orestes bachmaensis Bresseel & Constant, 2018; Orestes botot Bresseel & Constant, 2018; Orestes diabolicus Bresseel & Constant, 2018; Orestes dittmari Bresseel & Constant, 2018; Orestes draegeri Bresseel & Constant, 2018; Orestes guangxiensis (Bi & Li, 1994); Orestes japonicus (Ho, 2016); Orestes krijnsi Bresseel & Constant, 2018; Orestes mouhotii (Bates, 1865); Orestes shirakii (Ho & Brock, 2013); Orestes subcylindricus (Redtenbacher, 1906); Orestes ziegleri (Zompro & Fritzsche, 1999)
	Planispectrum Rehn, J.A.G. & Rehn, J.W.H., 1939	Planispectrum bakiensis Zompro, 1998; Planispectrum bengalense (Redtenbacher, 1906); Planispectrum cochinchinensis (Redtenbacher, 1906); Planispectrum hainanensis (Chen & He, 2008); Planispectrum hongkongense Zompro, 2004; Planispectrum javanense Zompro, 2004; Planispectrum pusillus (Redtenbacher, 1906)
	Pylaemenes Stål, 1875	Pylaemenes abramovi Ho, 2018; Pylaemenes borneensis (Bragg, 1998); Pylaemenes coronatus (de Haan, 1842); Pylaemenes elenamikhailorum Seow-Choen, 2016; Pylaemenes enganoensis Seow-Choen, 2020; Pylaemenes gravidus Bates, 1865); Pylaemenes gulinqingensis Gao & Xie, 2022; Pylaemenes konchurangensis Ho, 2018; Pylaemenes konkakinhensis Ho, 2018; Pylaemenes longispinus Seow-Choen, 2018; Pylaemenes mitratus Redtenbacher, 1906); Pylaemenes moluccanus (Redtenbacher, 1906); Pylaemenes muluensis (Bragg, 1998); Pylaemenes nullispinus Seow-Choen, 2020; Pylaemenes oileus (Westwood, 1859); Pylaemenes otys (Westwood, 1859); Pylaemenes pleurospinosus Hennemann & Le Tirant, 2021; Pylaemenes pui Ho, 2013; Pylaemenes scrupeus Bresseel & Jiaranaisakul, 2021; Pylaemenes sepilokensis (Bragg, 1998); Pylaemenes spiniventris (Bates, 1865); Pylaemenes waterstradti (Bragg, 1998)
	Spinodares Bragg, 1998	Spinodares jenningsi Bragg, 1998
	Woodlarkia Günther, 1932	Woodlarkia scorpionides (Montrouzier, 1855)
