= Platymorpha =

Scientific classification
- Kingdom: Animalia
- Phylum: Arthropoda
- Clade: Pancrustacea
- Class: Insecta
- Order: Coleoptera
- Suborder: Polyphaga
- Infraorder: Cucujiformia
- Family: Chrysomelidae
- Tribe: Luperini
- Subtribe: Diabroticina
- Genus: Platymorpha; Jacoby, 1888

Genus of leaf beetles

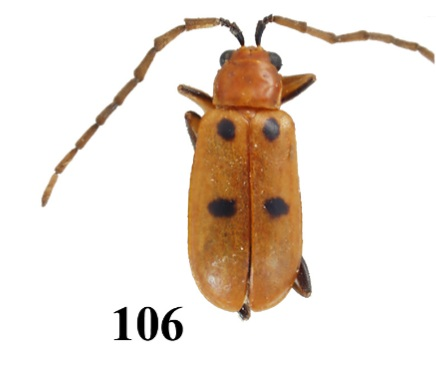
Platymorpha variegata

Platymorpha is a genus of beetles belonging to the family Chrysomelidae.

== Species ==
- Platymorpha centromaculata (Jacoby, 1888)
- Platymorpha homoia Blake, 1966
- Platymorpha variegata Jacoby, 1888
