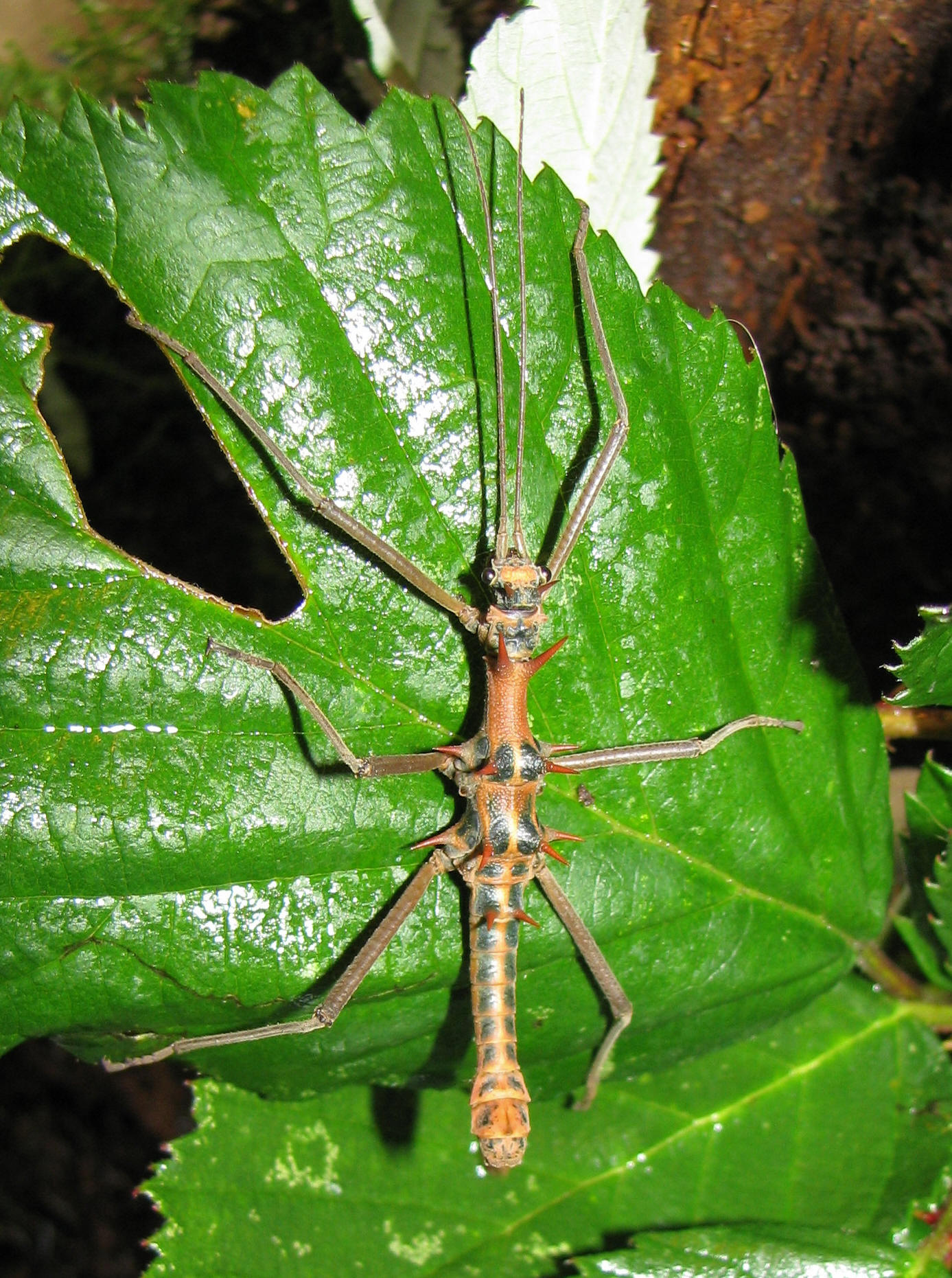
- Male

Scientific classification
- Kingdom: Animalia
- Phylum: Arthropoda
- Class: Insecta
- Order: Phasmatodea
- Family: Heteropterygidae
- Tribe: Datamini
- Genus: Epidares; Redtenbacher, 1906
- Species: E. nolimetangere

Binomial name
- Epidares nolimetangere (de Haan, 1842)

= Epidares =

Species of stick insect

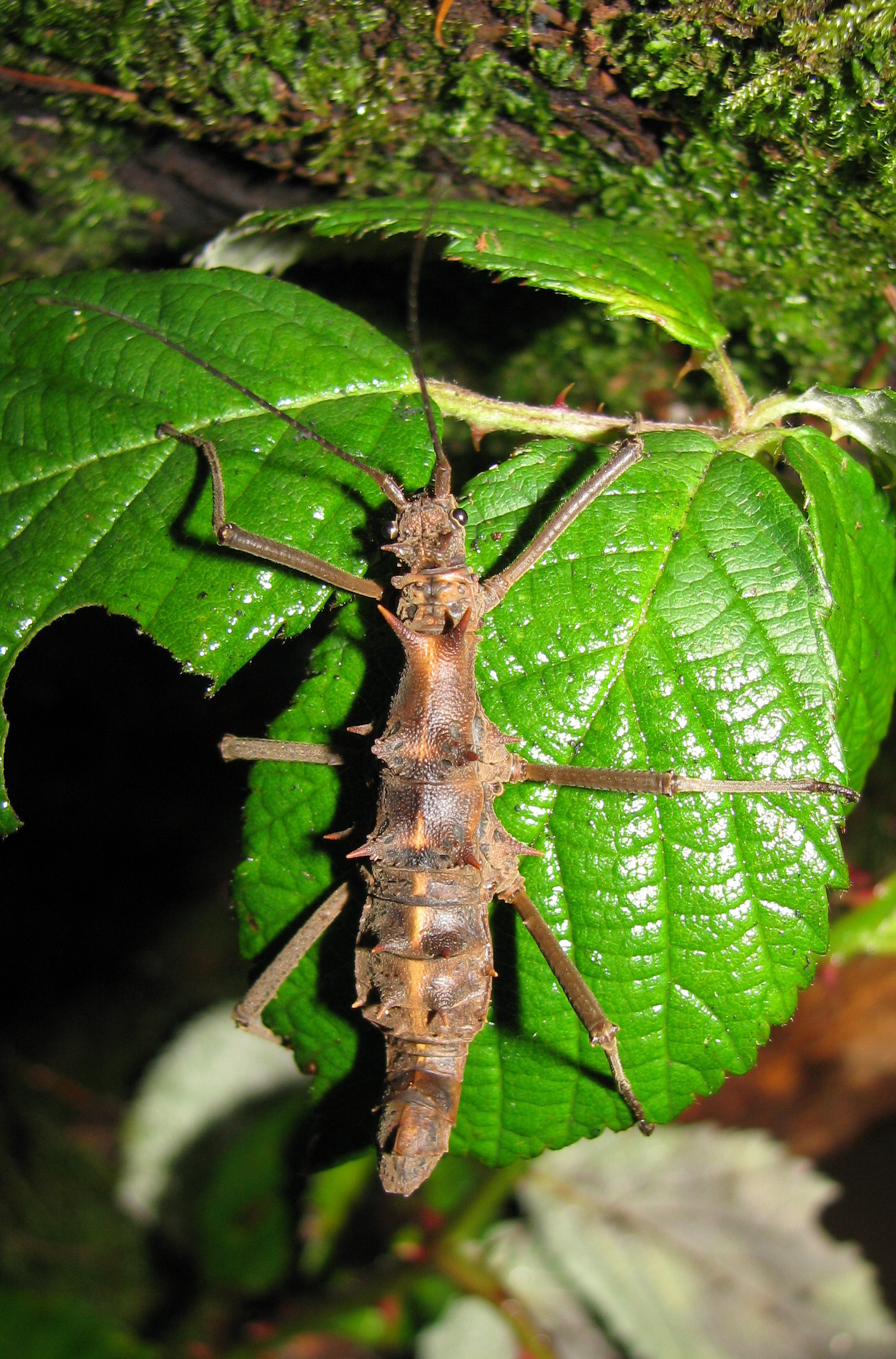
female

Epidares nolimetangere, the touch-me-not stick insect, is an insect species from the order of the Phasmatodea and the only representative of the genus Epidares. The species name nolimetangere (originally: noli-me-tangere) comes from Latin and means "don't touch me". It refers to the prickly appearance of the animals.

== Characteristics ==
Epidares nolimetangere is one of the smaller representatives of the Phasmatodea. The males are about 35 to 43 mm long, the females reach a length of about 45 to 48 mm and have shorter spines than the males. The insects, wingless in both sexes, have a pair of spines on the head and on the anterior margin of the mesonotum and a ring of four spines on the posterior margin of the meso- and metathorax. On the entire abdomen of the males there is only one pair of spines, which can be found on the second abdominal segment. In addition to this, the females also have a pair of spines on the third abdominal segment, which is supplemented by smaller, mostly lateral spines. The females are monochrome dark brown except for a light central stripe. The abdomen of egg-laying females is thickened in the middle. The males show dark areas on the back from the posterior mesothorax, especially in the areas around the spines and on the abdomen. There are other spots on the pronotum and between the lateral and dorsal spines of the meso- and metathorax, the spines themselves being light-colored. On the abdomen, the dark areas flow together to form two parallel longitudinal stripes. These spots can be small or significantly larger or flow together. Their color can be brown to dark green or metallic green. The basic color of the males varies from a light brown on the legs to a bright red, especially on the head, thorax and the top of the abdomen, depending on where they were found. Other location variants are also simply colored light brown between the green spots. Depending on the source, the animals with a more red base color and smaller spots are referred to as a red color form, those with larger, more metallic green spots as a green color form. Ian Abercrombie found another color form, clearly distinguishable from these forms, the males of which he describes as golden. Also Francis Seow-Choen refers to the Bako occurring color form as golden. He calls a second one that occurs in the area around Kuching dark or blue.

== Distribution area, way of life and reproduction ==
Epidares nolimetangere comes from Borneo. There it can be found very frequently in the northwest, more precisely in the Malay state Sarawak and here it reaches the highest observed population density of phasmatodea living on Borneo.

The insects live on low shrub vegetation of the tropical rainforest. As food plants are known, Rosaceae like the Molucca bramble (Rubus moluccanus), Melastomataceae like Clidemia hirta, Vitaceae like Leea indica, Acanthaceae as Strobilanthes alternata and Bonnetiaceae as Ploiarium alternifolium. The females lay one to three eggs about 3.5 to 3.9 mm long, 2.9 to 3.1 mm wide and an average of 6.8 mg each week for a period of up to twenty months. These are covered with barbed hairs. They are placed individually in a hollow dug with the legs. The abdomen is bent forward over the back and the then released egg is rolled over the parallel held antennae into the hollow. This is covered again after the eggs have been laid. After three to six months, the seven to twelve millimeter long nymphs hatch from the eggs. Males are after about eight months, females after about ten months adult. After another three to four weeks, the females begin to lay eggs.

== Taxonomy ==
Wilhem de Haan originally described this species as Phasma (Acanthoderus) noli-me-tangere. Josef Redtenbacher established the subgenus Epidares within the genus Dares for this species. Due to the clear differences between the only species Dares (Epidares) nolimetangere and the rest of the members of the genus Dares, Epidares has been classified as a genus and was identified as such in 1977 by James Chester Bradley and Bella S. Galil addressed. A female lectotype and a male paralectotype are deposited in the Naturalis Biodiversity Center in Leiden. The genus is monotypic. Seow-Choen shows a male on the cover of his book in 2016 and a female on page 389, both of which are bright red all over their body. Only the femura are bright green. Morphologically they resemble Epidares nolimetangere and are addressed as such in the captions. These animals are not discussed further by the author and still have to be examined taxonomically.

== Terraristic ==
The first breeding stocks were imported in 1988 from Mount Serapi as green form by Philip Edward Bragg and in 1989 from Mount Matang as red form by Patrick van der Stigchel. By mixing the two stocks, insects are bred that can no longer be clearly assigned to the red or green form. Other tribes also collected in Sarawak have been imported from Kubah, Semenggoh and Bako. In the ones from Bako there are often males, which lack the pair of spines on the abdomen. Occasionally there are also males with only one spine sting instead of the usual pair. The Belgian phasmid breeders Kim D'Hulster and Hans Lamal brought another stock into breeding in 2012, which they collected in Damai near Mount Santubong. Animals of this stock called Epidares nolimetangere 'Santubong' are characterized by the fact that their spines on the margin of meso- and metathorax are Y-shaped, i.e. designed as double spines. From Santubong other finds with this peculiarity are known, which also show the above-mentioned, bright red animals, which were pictured by Seow-Choen in 2016. The remaining breeding stocks, if they are passed on unmixed, are also given with their origin. So that in addition to the stock from Santubong also the stocks Epidares nolimetangere 'Mt. Serapi', Epidares nolimetangere 'Matang' (also called "red Matangs"), Epidares nolimetangere 'Kubah', Epidares nolimetangere 'Semenggoh' and Epidares nolimetangere 'Bako'. Three of these stocks were included in the genetic analysis by Sarah Bank et al. and were found to be conspecific. The species is listed by the Phasmid Study Group under the PSG number 99.

Epdares nolimetangere needs a relative humidity of at least 80%, as can be achieved in a glass terrarium with small ventilation slots. In contrast to insufficient humidity, waterlogging is well tolerated. In addition to leaves of oak and hazel, the various Rosaceae such as bramble, raspberries, strawberries and firethorn are eaten. A layer of earth is suitable as a substrate covered with some moss, which should always be kept moist. The eggs can be left on or in the ground.

== Gallery ==
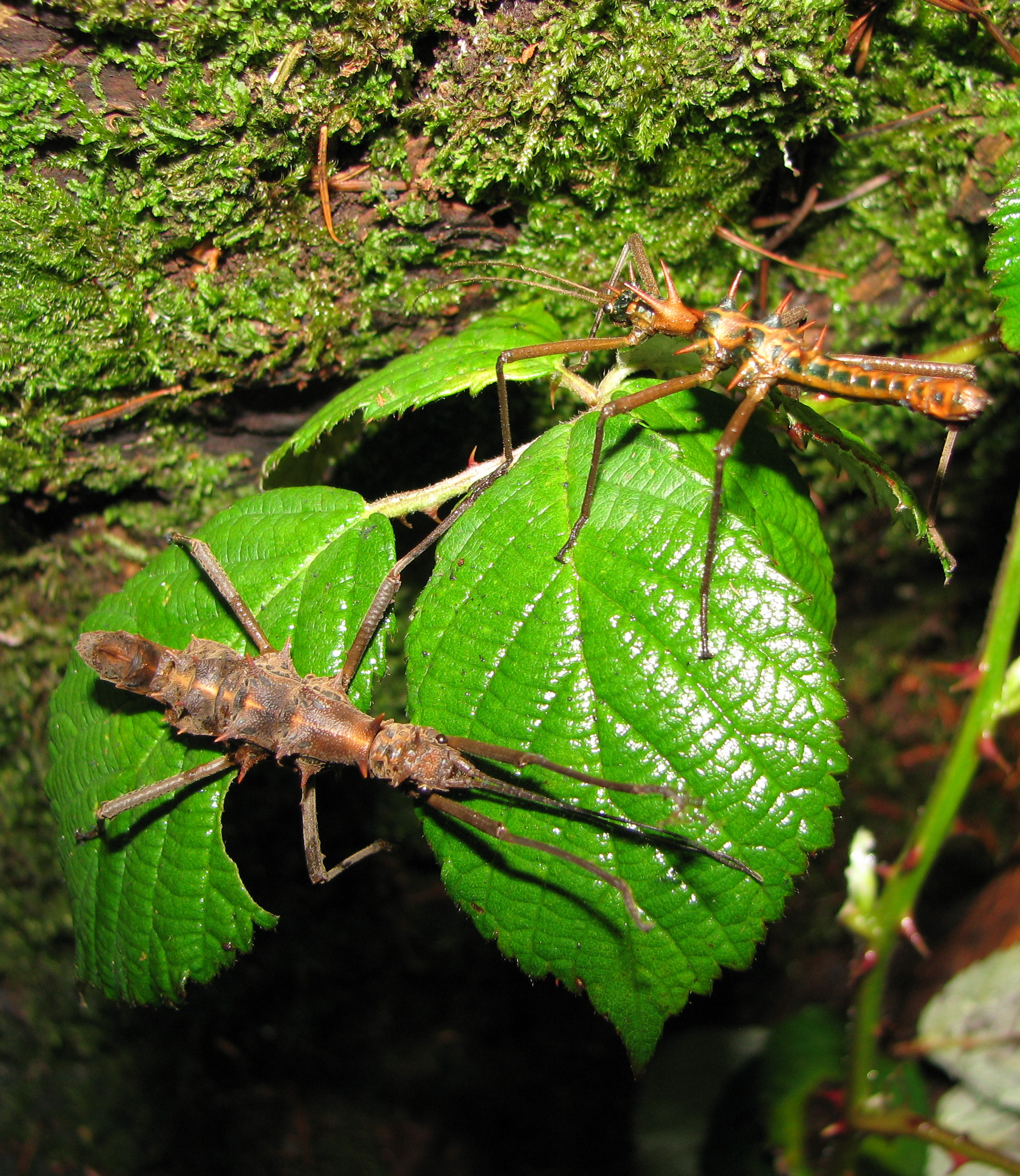
Pair

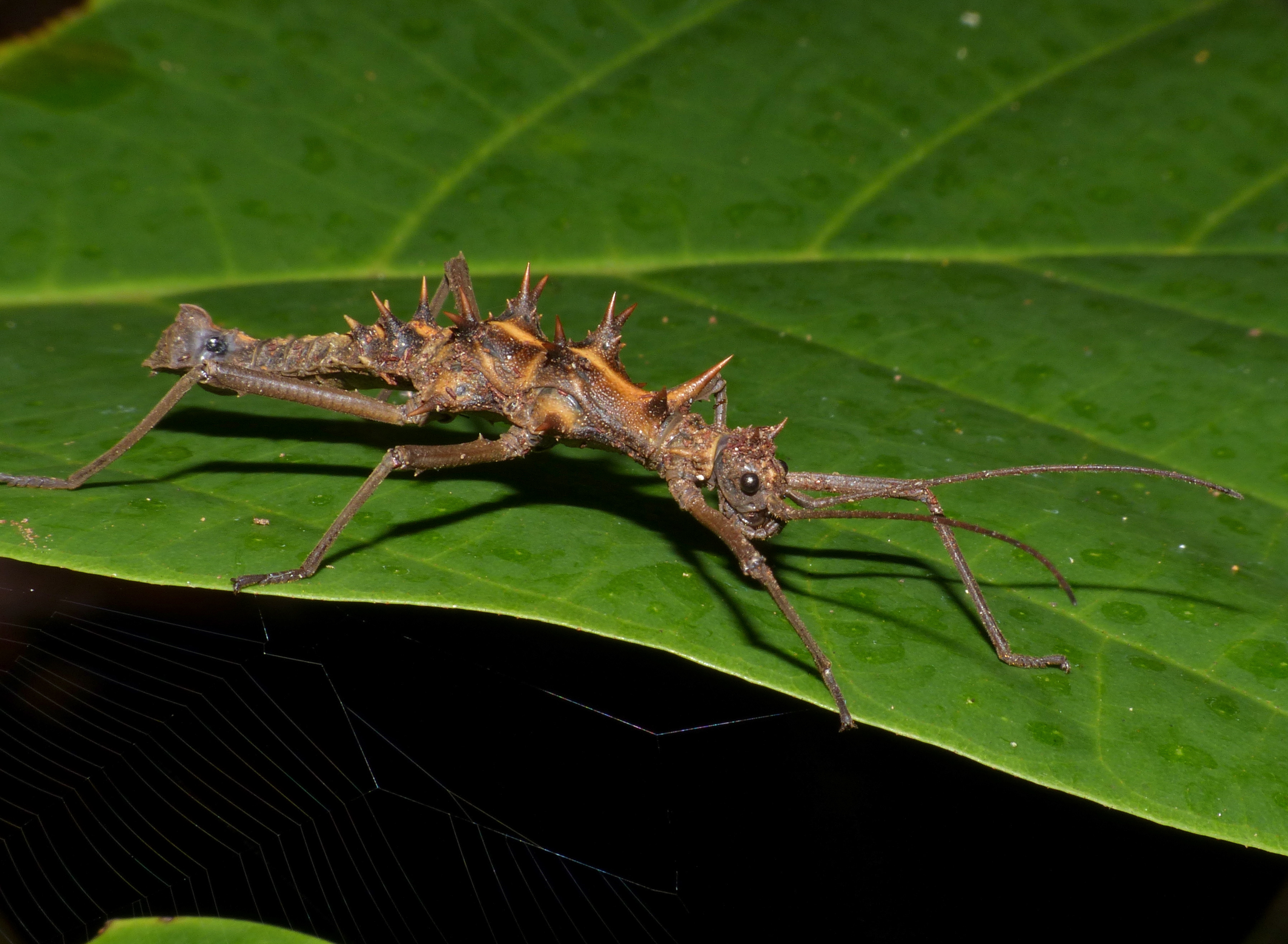
Female with double spines from Santubong

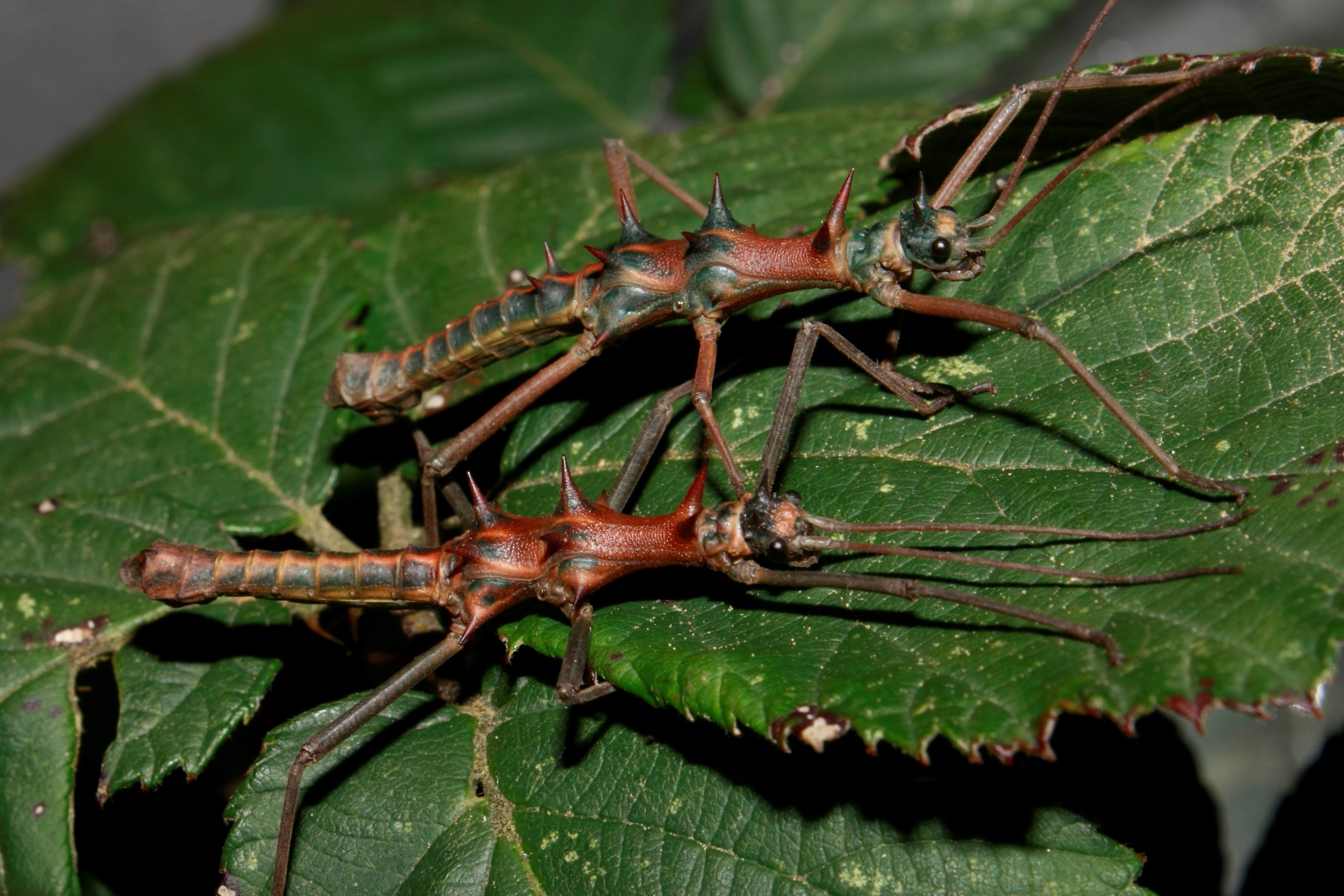
Males from Bako stock, the one in front lacks the spines on the abdomen

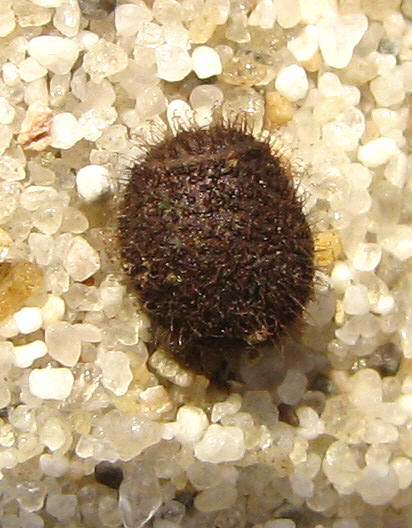
Egg
