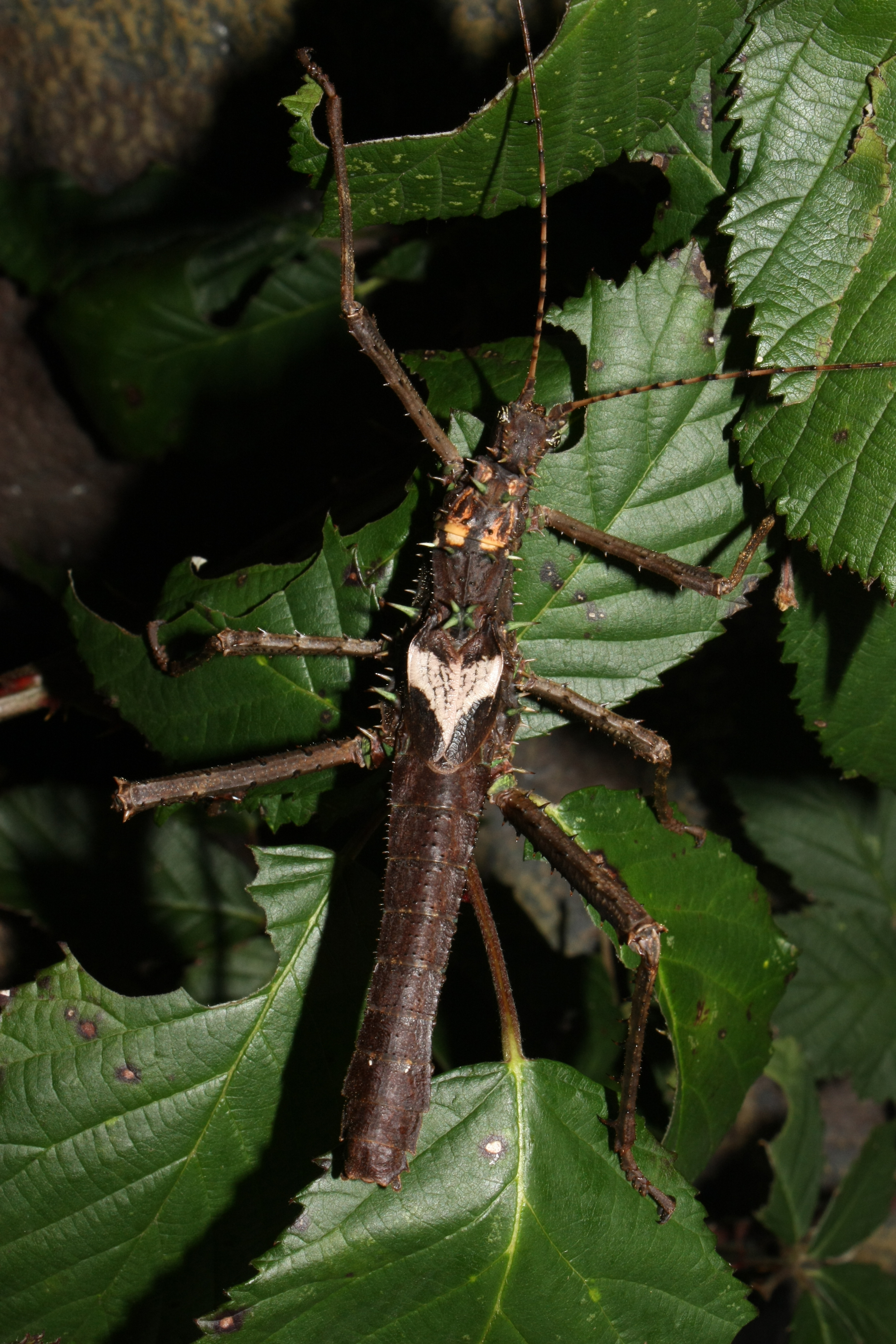
- Haaniella echinata, male

Scientific classification
- Kingdom: Animalia
- Phylum: Arthropoda
- Class: Insecta
- Order: Phasmatodea
- Family: Heteropterygidae
- Subfamily: Heteropteryginae
- Tribe: Heteropterygini
- Genus: Haaniella
- Species: H. echinata

Binomial name
- Haaniella echinata (Redtenbacher, 1906)

= Haaniella echinata =

Species of stick insect

Haaniella echinata is a stick insect species that is native to the entire north of Borneo. After Haaniella scabra, it is the representative of the genus Haaniella that inhabits the highest biotopes on Borneo.

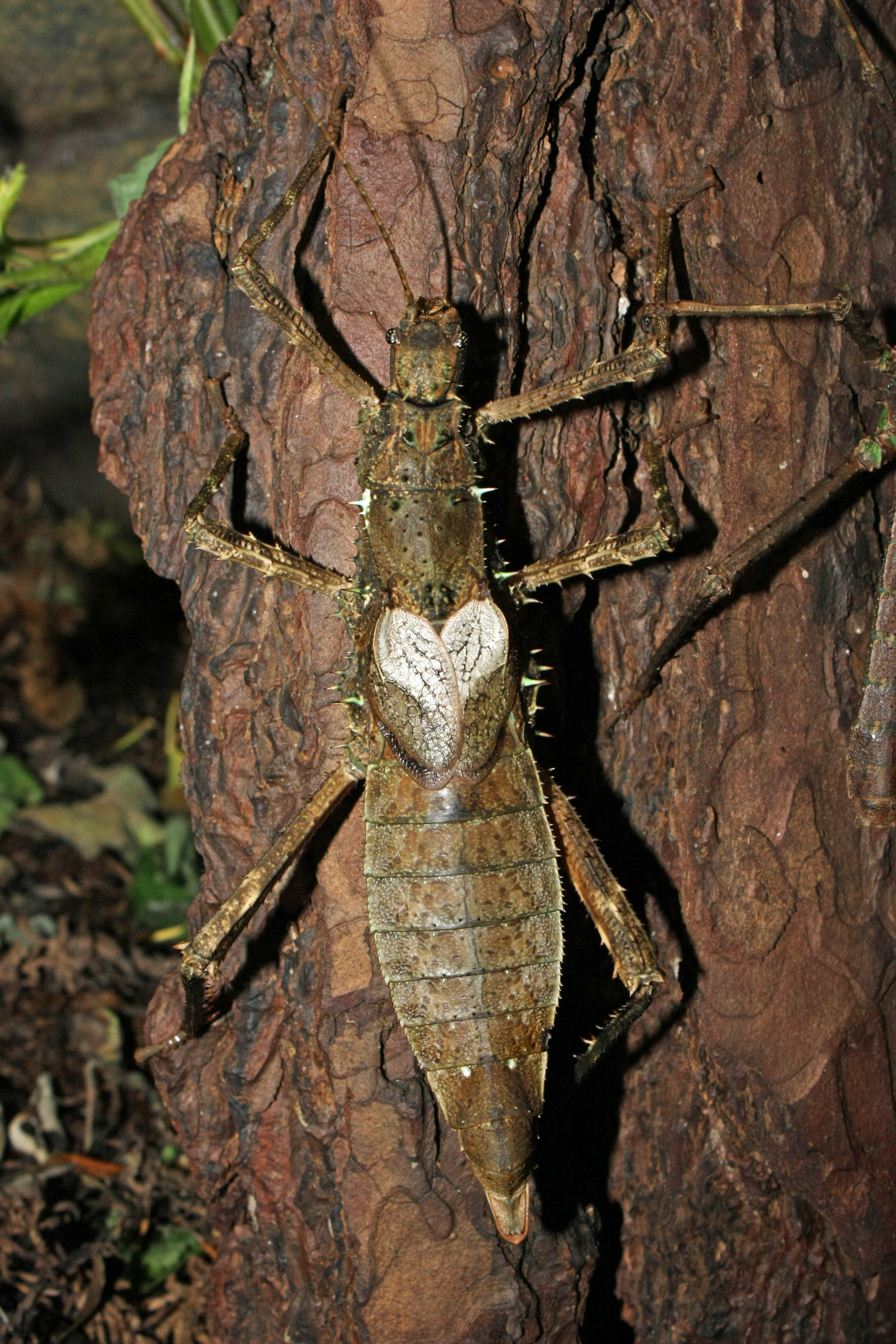
Female

== Description ==
Like all members of this genus, both sexes of Haaniella echinata also have many sharp spines on the head. In this species, too, both pairs of wings are shortened, with the forewings, which are developed as tegmina, completely covering the hindwings, which have been converted into stridulation organs. The characteristics that make this species unmistakable include the bright turquoise-blue interarticular membranes on the coxae and between the first sternites of the abdomen, which can already be found in the newly hatched nymph. They form a clear contrast to the underside of the hind coxae and the femurs of the hind legs, which is often clearly colored red, especially in the nymphs. In adults, these areas are usually only colored reddish brown or orange. In adult males, the turquoise blue sometimes gives way to turquoise green.

The females reach a body length of 9 to 13.5 centimetres (3.5 to 5.3 in). They are thus hardly smaller than the largest Haaniella species, Haaniella grayii. The abdomen ends with the spine-like ovipositor typical of the subfamily Heteropteryginae. The ventral part of this ovipositor called subgenital plate or operculum, is usually somewhat longer in Haaniella echinata females than the dorsal part, which is called supraanal plate or epiproct. At the end of the epiproct there are four, often indistinct teeth. The operculum is keeled in the middle and rounded at the tip. The coloring of the females is usually dominated by a dark brown base color. Light brown animals are rarer. The larger spines are greenish in color. In many dark brown females, the area around the transition from the pro- to the mesonotum is somewhat lighter and also often has a slightly greenish tinge. There are also females that have light speckled spots on their legs or their entire body.

Males are significantly smaller than females, measuring 7 to 9.5 centimetres (2.8 to 3.7 in) in length. Dark brown tones usually dominate in them too. In addition to the turquoise-green areas already mentioned, the membranes of the joints of the front and middle coxae and the larger spines are usually striking dark green. Many males have two light brown areas running parallel to the body axis, which can extend across the entire pronotum to the front mesonotum and are lightest at the transition between these two thoracic segments.

The forewings of both sexes are usually characterized by very variable white patterns. These can be heart-shaped, wide or narrow "V"-shaped, "M"-shaped or other shapes. Dark brown females also have no wing markings, just as completely speckled females can only have this marking on their wings.

== Occurrence ==
The distribution area of Haaniella echinata includes not only Brunei but also almost the entire Malaysian part of Borneo. Locations of this species have been documented throughout Sabah and, starting from the north, in two thirds of Sarawak. In addition to tropical rainforests in the lowlands, it also inhabits regions up to an altitude of 800 metres (2,600 ft), for example around Mount Kinabalu.

== Behavior and reproduction ==
The species is nocturnal and similar to other members of the genus living on Borneo. Its defensive behaviour also consists of spreading out its raised, spined hind legs and closing them when touched by an attacker. The eggs, which are up to 12 millimetres (0.47 in) long and about 8 millimetres (0.31 in) wide, are laid at night. The eggs, which weigh 250 to 300 mg, are deposited in the ground using the ovipositor. In addition to dark brown, bristly eggs with a flat lid (operculum), there are also lighter, barely hairy eggs with a lid that rises slightly conically towards the middle. In the latter, the diagonally cross-shaped micropylar plate, in the lower angle of which the micropyle is located, is easier to see. The nymphs hatch after 6 to 12 months. With a body length of 37 millimetres (1.5 in) and their compact build, they are among the largest and heaviest insect hatchlings. On the underside they already show the colorful markings already described. On the upper side they are initially brown except for a white spot on each of the hind legs and an abdominal segment with a white border on the outside. In older nymphs these white spots disappear and the animals increasingly take on the coloring of the imagines. They need 10 to 12 months to become adults.

== Taxonomy ==
In 1906, Josef Redtenbacher described the species as Heteropteryx echinata, without using the genus name Haaniella, which had already been introduced by William Forsell Kirby in 1904. Redtenbacher shows drawings of a male and a female. The specific name "echinata" was chosen in reference to the spiny body surface (ancient Greek echínos (ἐχῖνος) for sea urchin (Echinoidea)). James Abram Garfield Rehn first referred to the species in 1938 with the name Haaniella echinata, which is still used today.

A number of syntypes are deposited in the Natural History Museum, Vienna (originally from the collection of Redtenbacher), in the Zoological Museum (Saint Petersburg) and in the Natural History Museum, Berlin, of which a male deposited in Vienna was designated as the lectotype in 2005. Redtenbacher mentioned also specimens from the collection of Malcolm Burr.

In 2016 Frank H. Hennemann et al. proposed a division of the genus Haaniella into three species groups. Haaniella echinata, Haaniella saussurei and Haaniella scabra from Borneo were assigned to the Echinata species group. This classification could not be confirmed by a study published in 2021 by Sarah Bank et al. In this study, four mitochondrial genes and three genes from the cell nucleus were examined to clarify the phylogeny of the Heteropterygidae. The results showed that Haaniella echinata forms a common clade with Haaniella scabra, which also includes Haaniella grayii and Haaniella dehaanii. The latter is the direct sister species of Haaniella echninata. Haaniella saussurei does not belong to this clade and occupies a special position within the genus. When examining morphologically slightly different animals collected at different locations, it turned out that these are representatives of at least two species that still need to be examined or described in more detail.

== Terraristic ==
After Allan Harmann first imported some animals for terraristic from Sabah in 1979, further imports followed from Sabah in 1984 and 1993, from Brunei in 1993 and 1994 and from Sarawak in 1996. The Phasmid Study Group lists Haaniella echinata under the PSG number 26.

To keep this species, medium to large terrariums with suitable hiding places and a substrate suitable for laying eggs that is always slightly moist are necessary. While relatively high humidity is necessary, temperatures of 20 to 25 °C (68 to 77 °F) are sufficient for successful keeping. The range of food plants is large. In addition to leaves from Rosaceae, such as those of bramble, raspberries and Crataegus species, they bees also eat leaves from oaks, ivy, hazels, rhododendrons and other plants. Haaniella echinata is considered to be the species within the genus that achieves the best hatching results.

== Gallery ==
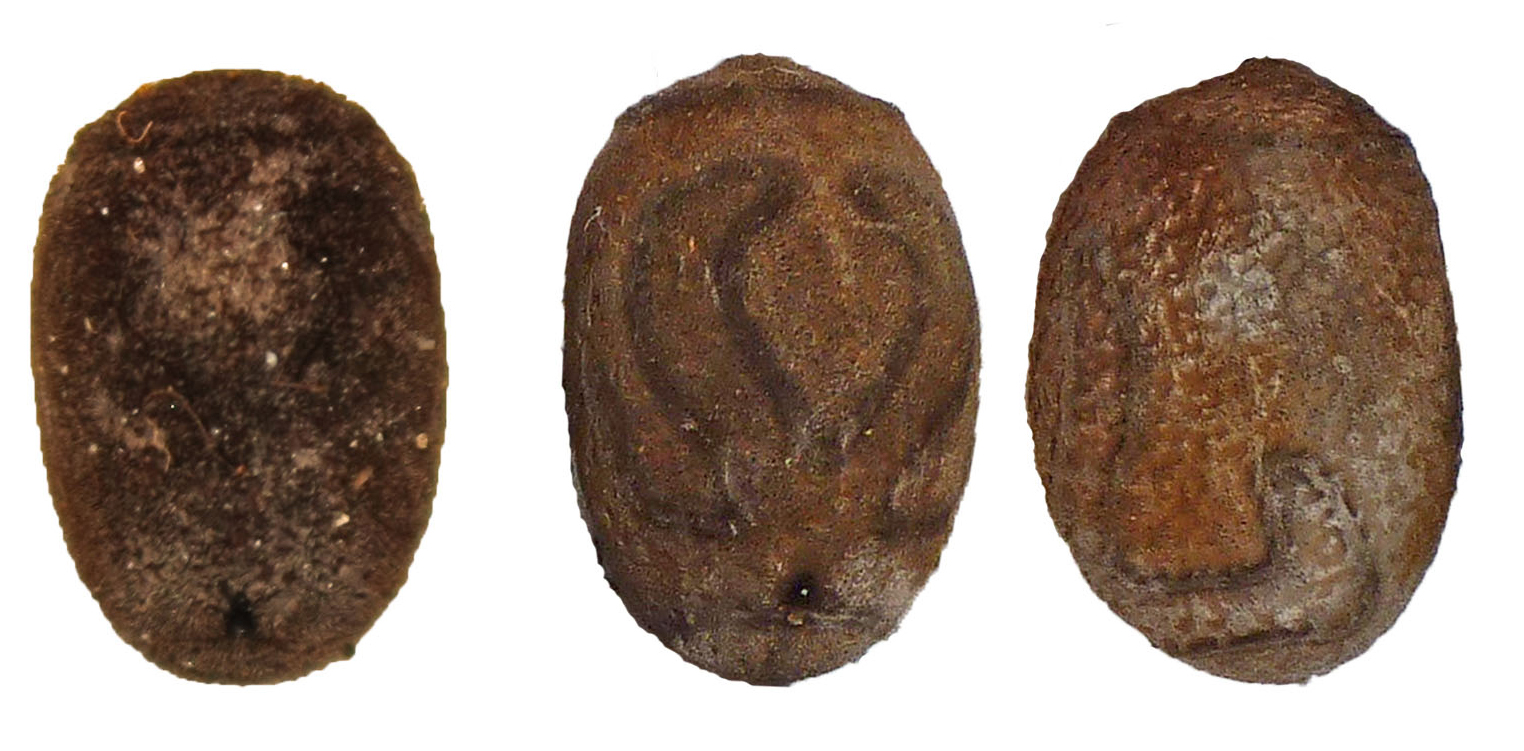
Left: dorsal view of an egg, middle and right: dorsal and lateral view of less hairy eggs

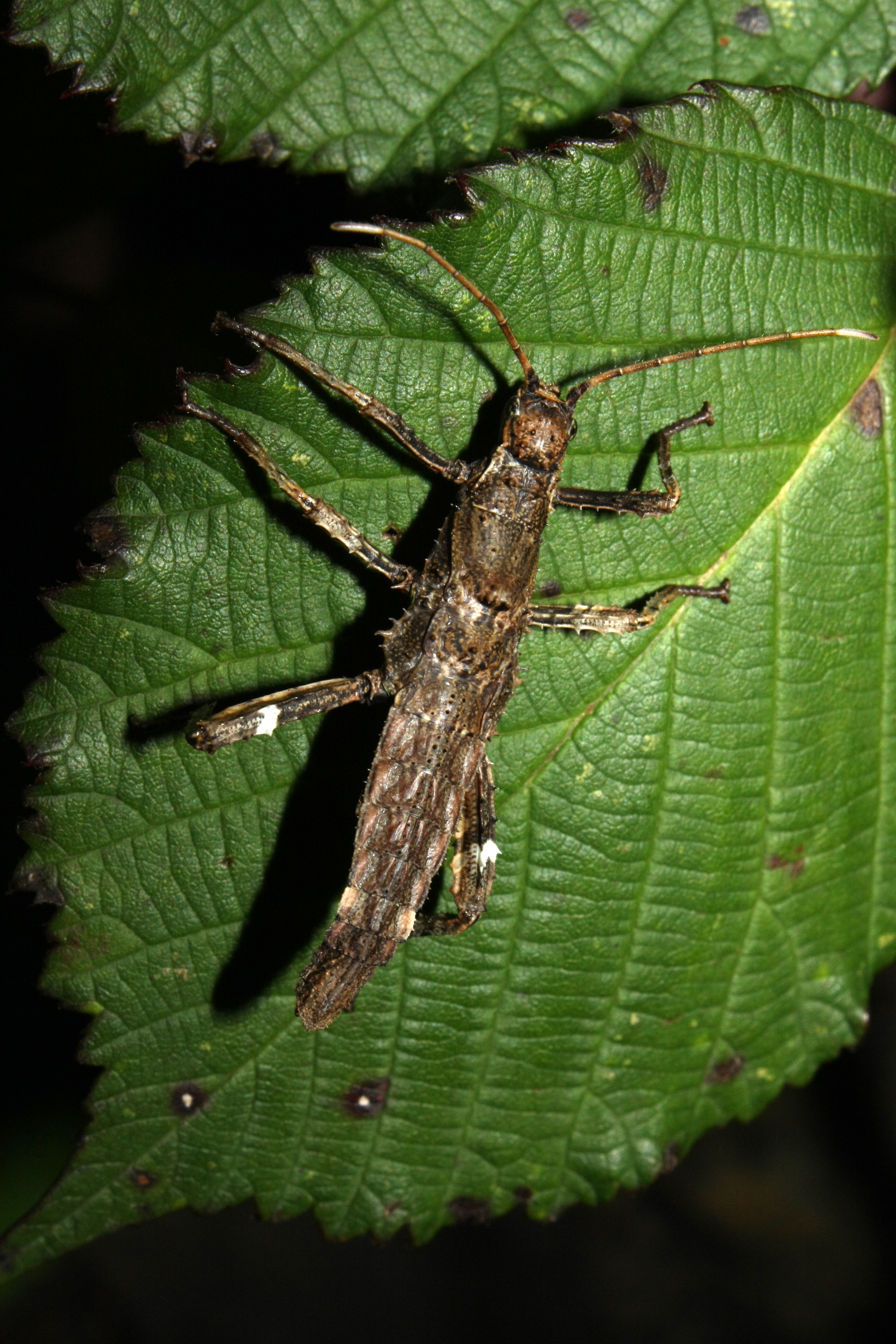
Newly hatched nymph

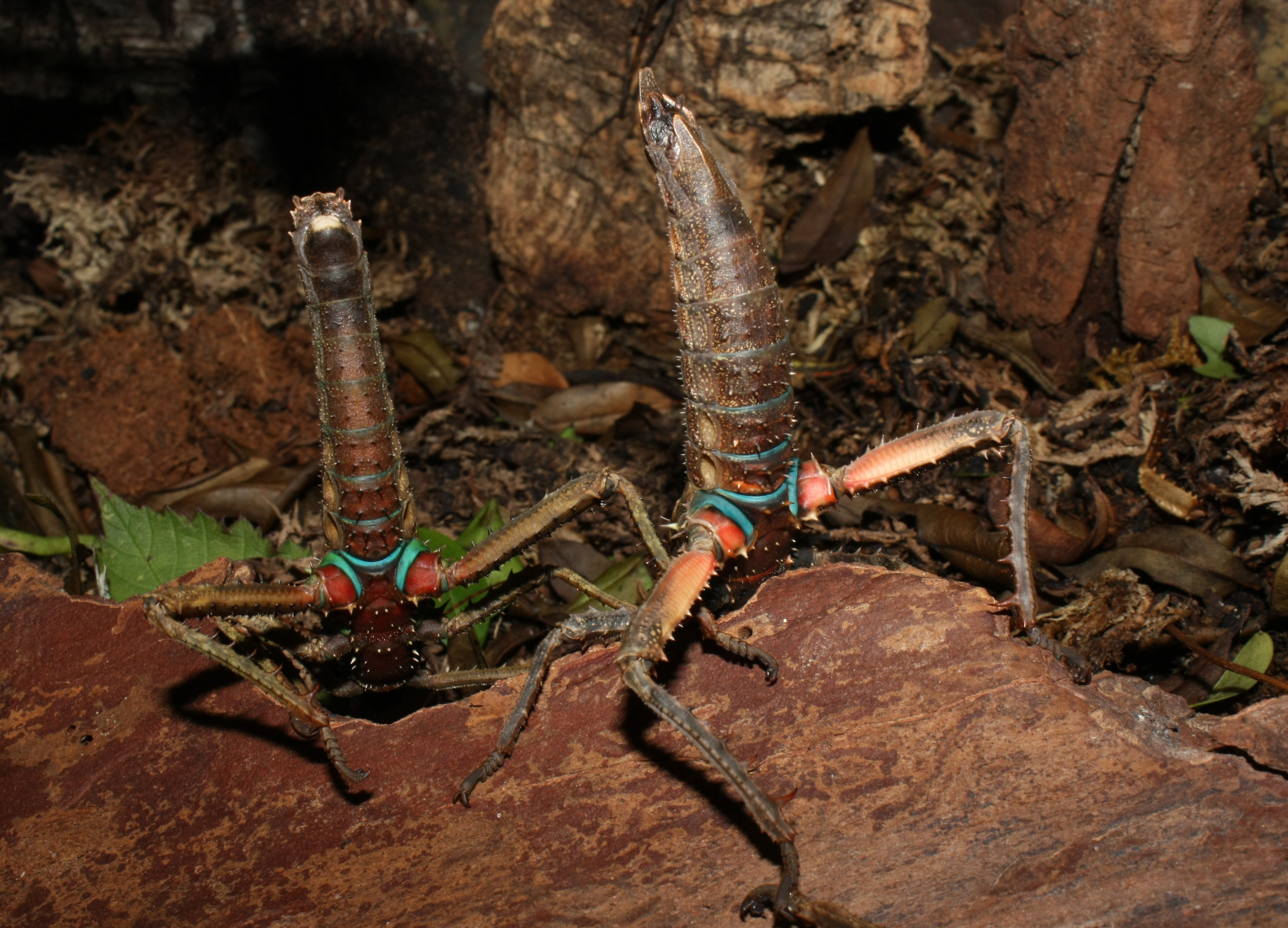
Underside of a subadult male and female nymph

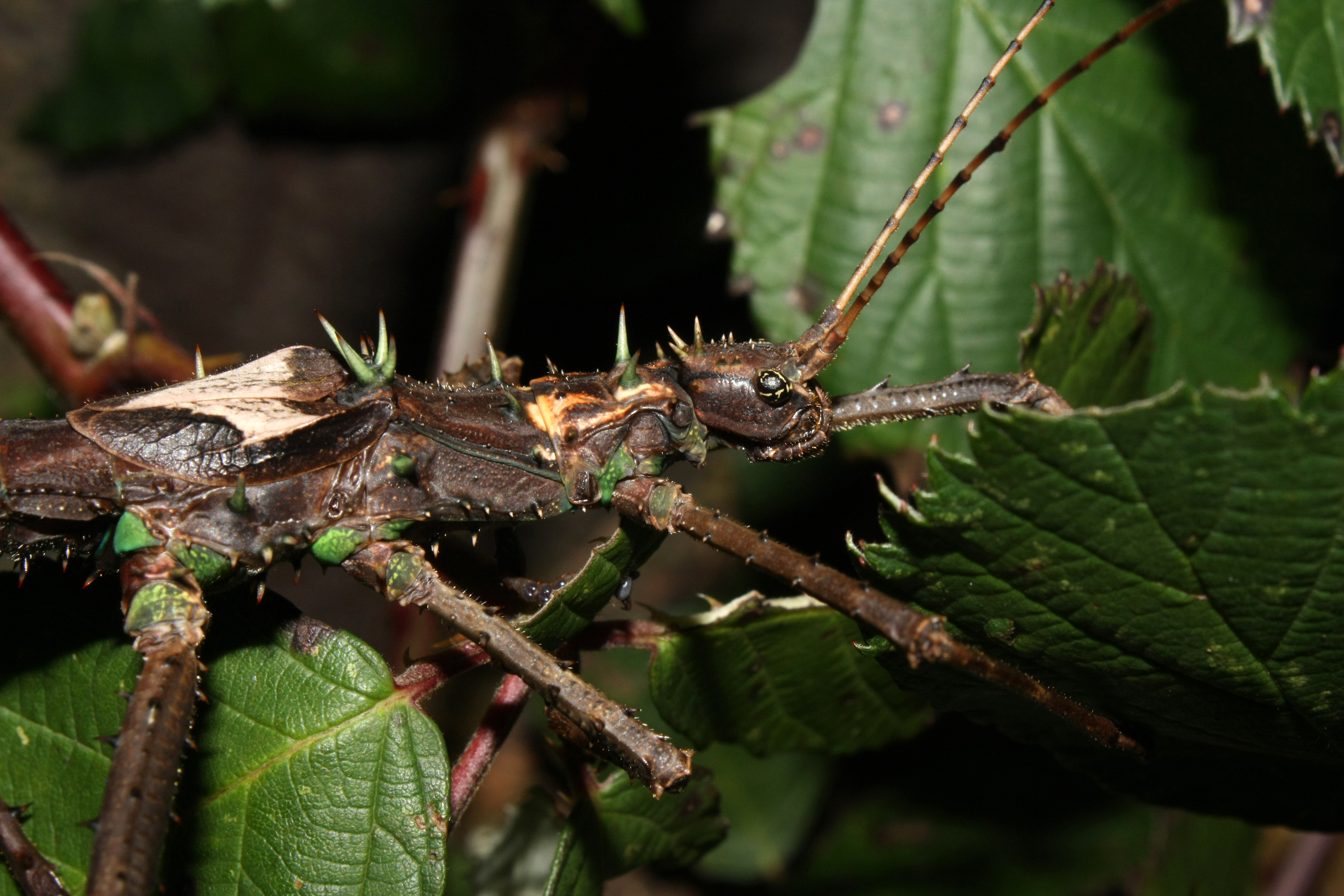
Portrait of a male
