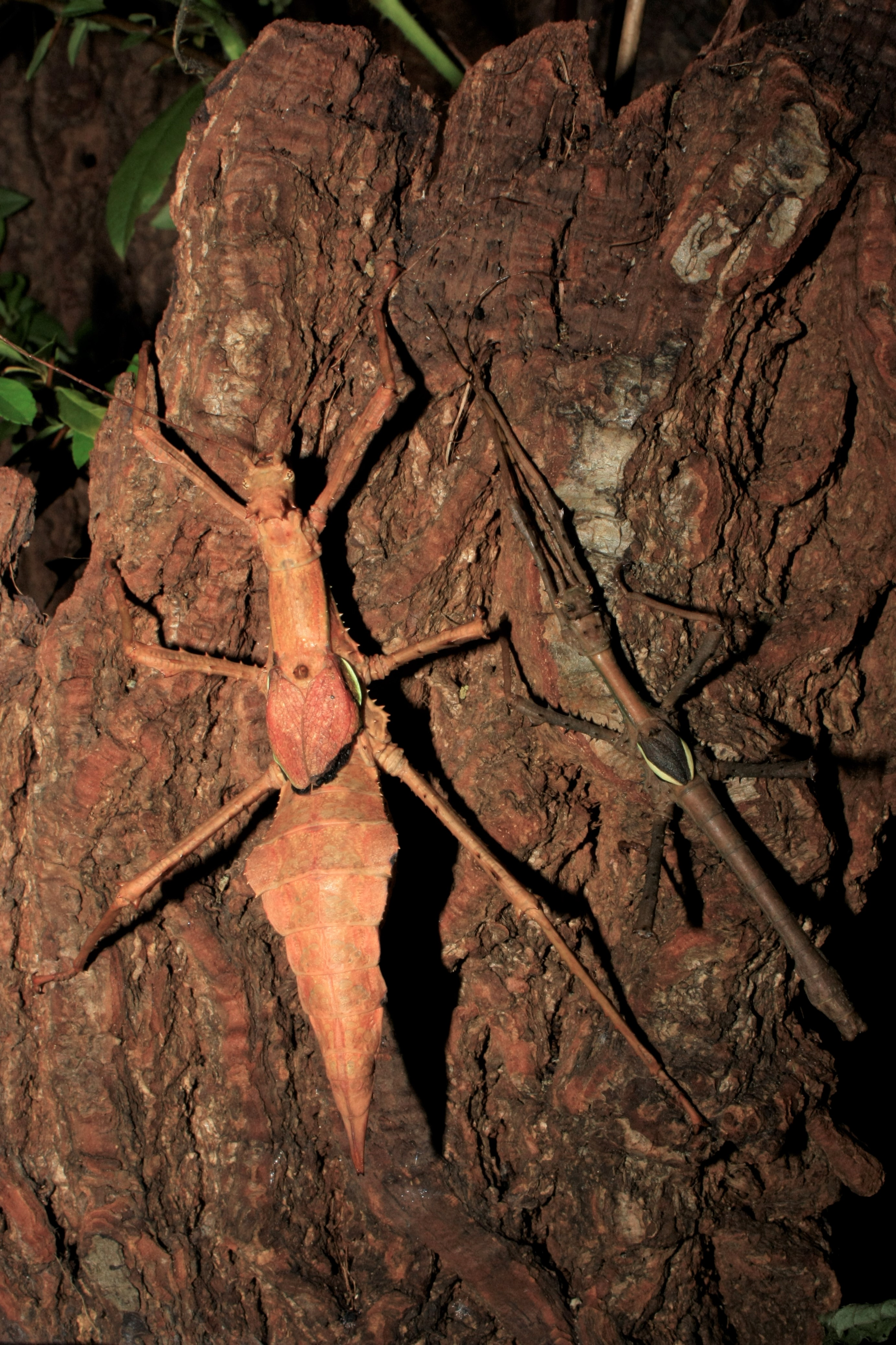
- Haaniella gintingi, pair from Sibayak breeding stock

Scientific classification
- Kingdom: Animalia
- Phylum: Arthropoda
- Clade: Pancrustacea
- Class: Insecta
- Order: Phasmatodea
- Family: Heteropterygidae
- Subfamily: Heteropteryginae
- Tribe: Heteropterygini
- Genus: Haaniella
- Species: H. gintingi

Binomial name
- Haaniella gintingi Hennenmann, Conle, Brock & Seow-Choen, 2016

= Haaniella gintingi =

Species of stick insect

Haaniella gintingi, also known as Ginting's Haaniella, is a species of stick insect found in Sumatra. It is a typical representative of the subfamily Heteropteryginae.

== Description ==
Haaniella gintingi is a medium-sized, very slender Haaniella species with few spines. The females, which are 84 to 105 millimetres (3.3 to 4.1 in) long, vary greatly in color and markings. Their basic color ranges from beige to light to dark brown and can appear somewhat orange or pink. A fine dull green stripe runs along the lateral margins of the mesonotum. In addition to darker triangles, which occur primarily in the nocturnal coloration, large, completely white areas can also appear on patterns, for example on the entire pro- and mesonotum and the anterior and posterior segments of the abdomen. Occasionally there is a narrow, dark longitudinal stripe, which can run down the center of the upper body to the end of the abdomen. While on the upper side of the thorax and abdomen, except for two posterio-median mesonotal spines between the base of the forewings, there are hardly any spines worth mentioning, there are clear spines on the mostly light to medium brown legs and on the head. On the underside of the body there are a few small thorns at regular intervals. On the femurs of the legs, in addition to spines, there is also an enlarged and triangular tooth. On the head, the anterior coronals are particularly striking, forming greatly enlarged, comb-like, swollen, mostly tridentate structures. On the posterior margin of the head there are two strong lateral coronals, which are slightly smaller than the posterior coronals (see also acanthotaxy of Heteropterygini). The forewings, which are designed as tegmina, reach up to a good half of the second abdominal segment, are brownish on top and are sometimes patterned. Their front outer edges are edged in a thinning line of apple green. The underside of the tegmina is red. The hind wings (alae) are translucent dark gray with black veins to completely black. All abdominal tergites are smooth above. From the second to the fourth tergite they become progressively broader, the fourth being the broadest and having almost semicircular curved margins. The segments five to seven are significantly narrower and have only slightly rounded side edges. The abdomen ends in a secondary ovipositor. Its ventral subgenital plate ends bluntly. The dorsal part of the ovipositor, which is called the supraanal plate or epiproct, is significantly longer than the ventral part and ends in a two-pronged tip.

The 61 to 70 millimetres (2.4 to 2.8 in) long males are always very uniformly colored. The body and legs are ocher brown with a slight greenish tinge. Only the mesosternum and the mesonotum are clearly brighter. The latter shows the olive-green stripes along the edges, which can also be found in the females. Mesothorax and abdomen are very thin and slender. The metathorax is the widest and thickest part of the body. The arrangement of the spines on the head, the legs, the mesonotal spines and the spines on the underside of the body correspond to those of the females, but are more pronounced and pointed. They are dark green at their base and more black towards the tips. The very short tegmina are uniformly dark brown with a bright apple-green front edge.

== Distribution area and discovery ==
The species inhabits tropical rainforests in northwestern Sumatra. The first specimen a female was collected in the early 1970s in the Indonesian province of Atjeh in Ketambe by H. D. Rijksen at an altitude of about 350 metres (1,150 ft) and deposited in the then National Museum of Natural History in Leiden (today Naturalis Biodiversity Center). Other specimens were later found in the province Sumatra Utara. First of them were collected in November 2010 near the Mount Sibayak at an altitude of 1,400 to 1,600 metres (4,600 to 5,200 ft) by Jimmy Gideon Ginting.

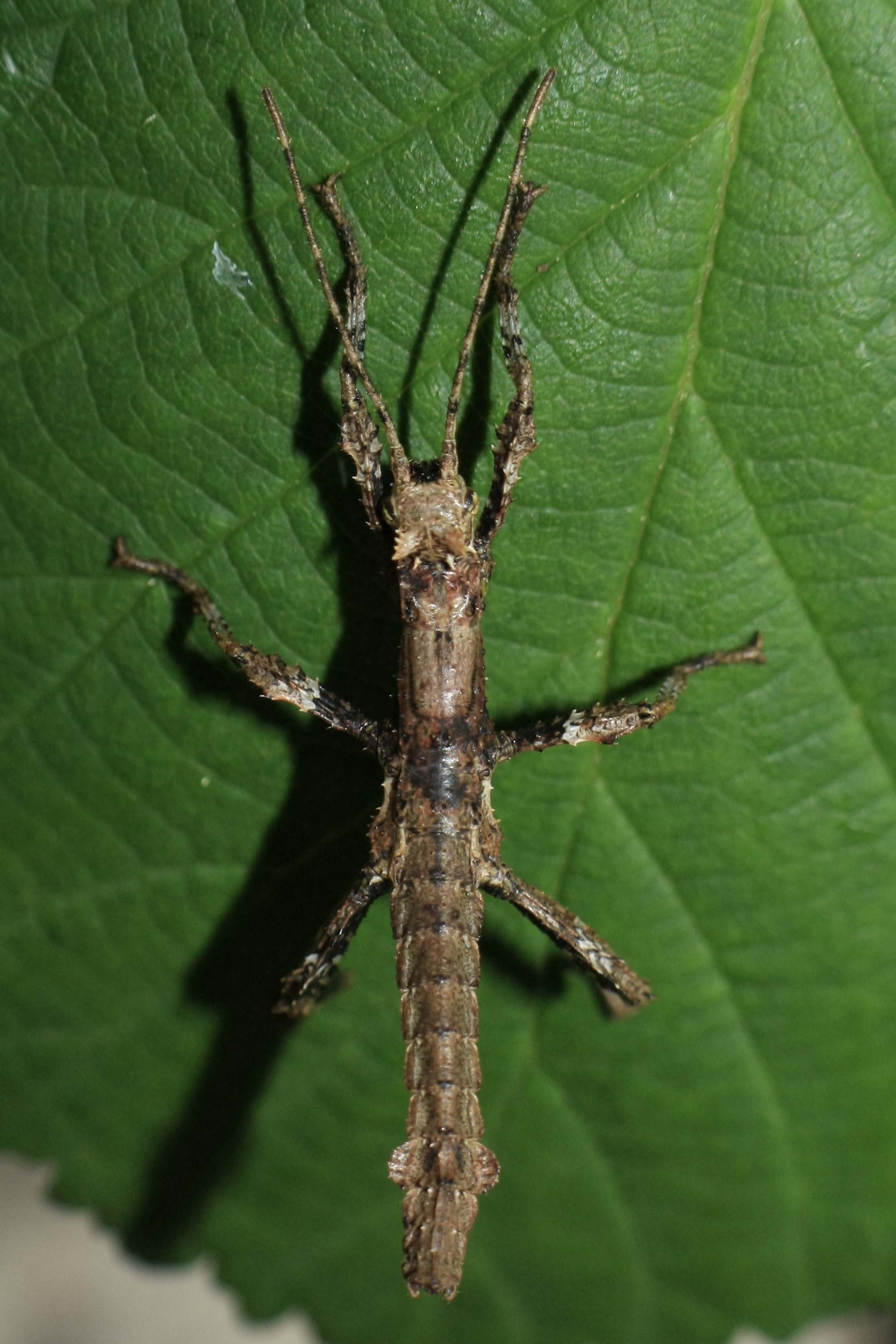
Male L1 nymph

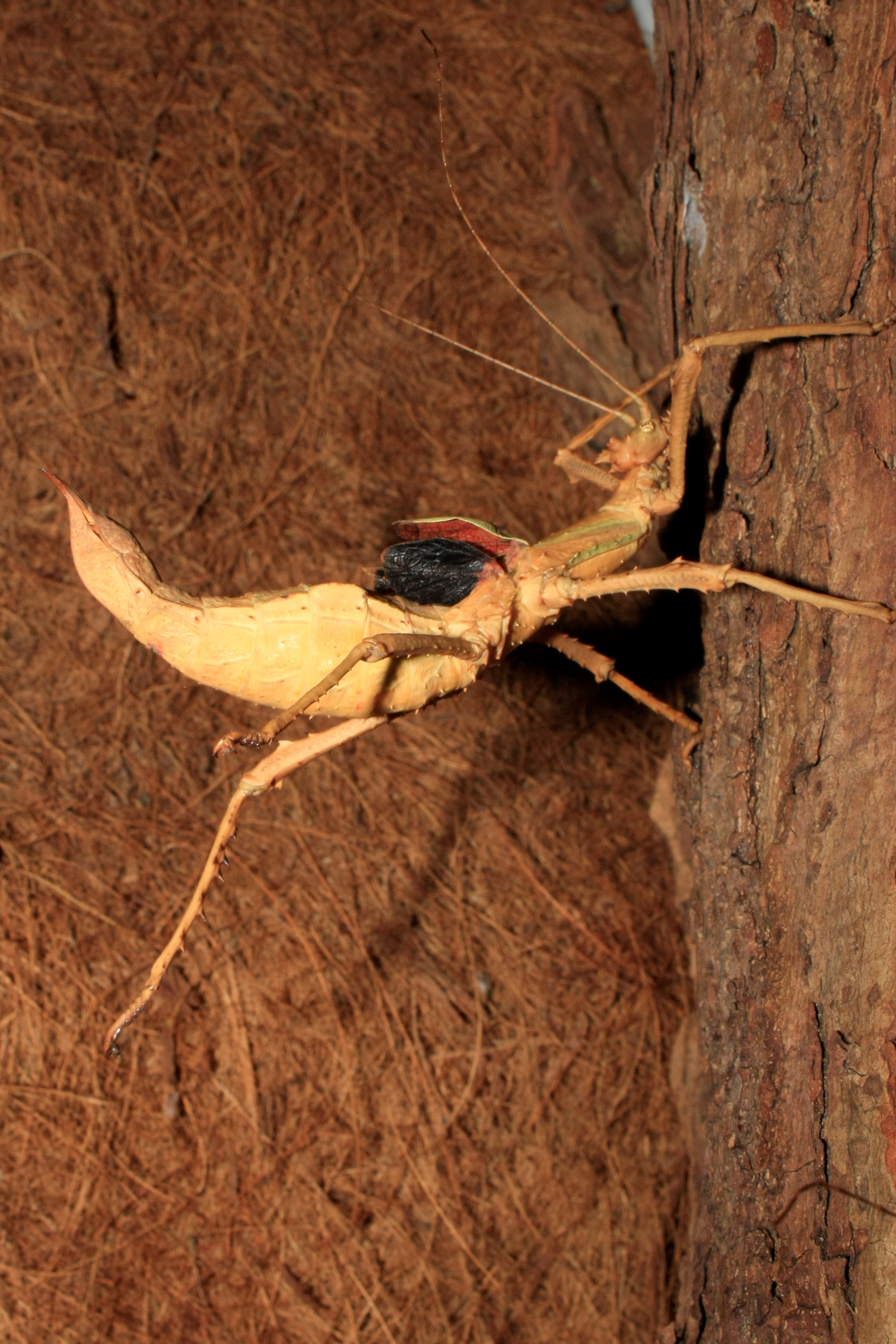
Threatening female

== Reproduction and behavior ==
Eggs are dull gray with black-rimmed micropylar plate. They are 6.2 to 7.7 millimetres (0.24 to 0.30 in) long, 3.8 to 4.5 millimetres (0.15 to 0.18 in) wide, 4.1 to 5.0 millimetres (0.16 to 0.20 in) high. The four arms of the X-shaped micropylar plate are short, and the two lower ones diverge almost horizontally. The micropyle is at the bottom between these arms. The lid (operculum) is slightly raised conically. It takes six to twelve months for the nymphs to hatch. Males and females can be distinguished immediately after hatching by the number of lateral lobes on the abdomen. While males have only a pair on the eighth segment, females have two smaller pairs of lobes on the sixth and seventh segments. Males are adult after about five months, females after seven to eight months. Females can live up to one year and lay up to 15 eggs per month. Males are a little more short-lived.

In the case of disturbance, the abdomen is set up in an arched manner or even pushed under the front body. This behavior can already be observed in older nymphs. More frequently than other members of the family, the species sprays a clear defense secretion from the defense glands in the prothorax, the smell of which is easily perceptible. Adult animals show the threatening behavior typical of short-winged species of this genus. In addition to the raising of the abdomen and hind legs, the defensive stridulation by using the wings is particularly noticeable in the females, since not only the dark gray to black colored hind wings are visible, but also the red underside of the fore wings. During the day the animals hide like most other representatives of the genus and only come out of their hiding places at night to eat and lay their eggs. A physiological color change can sometimes be observed, with the females in particular showing darker markings at night. The specimens were found in nature on trees of the genus Ficus and on Rubus moluccanus, a species widespread in Southeast Asia. However, feeding on these plants was not observed.

== Taxonomy ==
Frank H. Hennemann et al. described the species in 2016 using previously collected animals and their offspring. The specific name was given in honor of Jimmy Gideon Ginting, who collected this species in 2010. The adult female specimen collected in the early 1970s in north-west Sumatra by H. D. Rijksen was chosen as the holotype. It can still be found in the Naturalis Biodiversity Center in Leiden, where it was originally deposited. In addition to four paratypes that are in the Museum of Natural Sciences in Brussels, a larger number of paratypess of both sexes are deposited in the private collections of three of the four authors. The paratypes in the Hennemann and Oskar V. Conle collections are all derived from the animals collected at the Mount Sibayayk. The ones in the collection of Francis Seow-Choen were found in 2013 at the edge of the Sibolangit botanical garden in Brestagi and in 2014 on a roadside to Danau Toba. Both localities are in the province of Sumatra Utara.

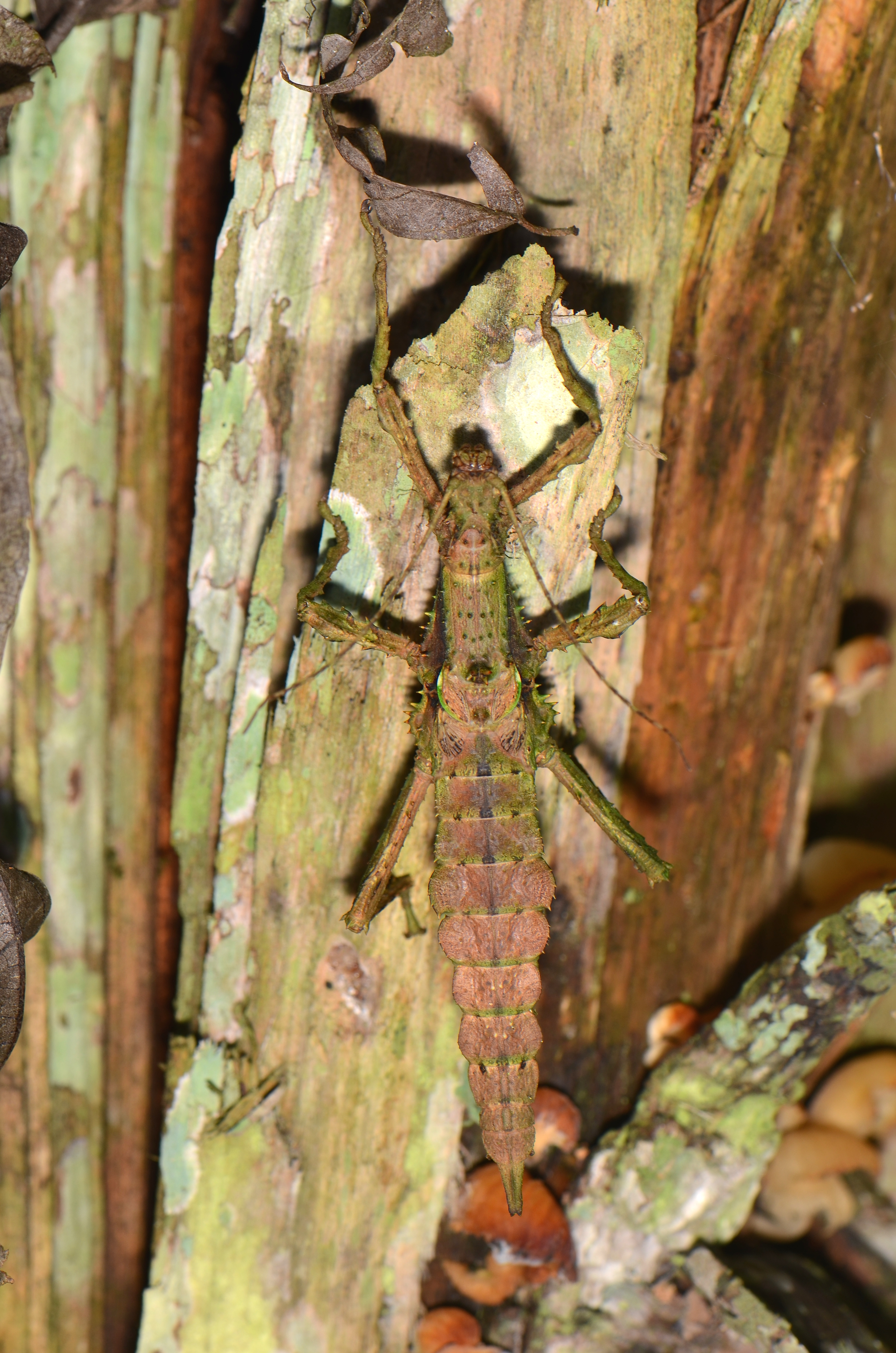
Subadult female nymph of the very similar species Haaniella azlini

Hennemann et al. divided the genus into different groups according to morphological characteristics and placed Haaniella gintingi together with almost all non-Bornean species in the "muelleri" species group. This assignment could not be confirmed, at least with regard to Haaniella erringtoniae. Sarah Bank et al. included both species in their molecular genetic studies. Of the species examined, Haaniella gorochovi, which is not assigned to this group, is more closely related to Haaniella gintingi than Haaniella erringtoniae.

In 2018, Francis Seow-Choen described Haaniella azlini, a species that closely resembles Haaniella gintingi in morphology, size and coloration and, like its holotype, comes from Atjeh Province. In the introductory of the description, Seow-Choen also names Haaniella azlini as a subspecies, although the text is explicitly identified as a species description. This species differs primarily in having four to five posterio-median mesonotal spines between the bases of the fore wings, while Haaniella gintingi has only two, although the holotype of Haaniella gintingi also has a crown four to five mesonotal spines.

== In terraristics ==
Eggs from the animals collected by Ginting reached Bruno Kneubühler in Switzerland in 2011. He was able to bring these to hatch and successfully breed the species. Since 2012, animals and eggs have been passed on to other breeders. The initially undescribed species was named Haaniella sp. 'Sibayak' according to their location.

Like all members of the genus, the species require relatively high humidity. A slightly moist substrate on the ground is necessary for laying eggs. In addition to bramble leaves or those of other Rosaceae as well as of hazel and oak are eaten. In addition, hiding places should be available, for example in the form of pieces of bark.

== Gallery ==
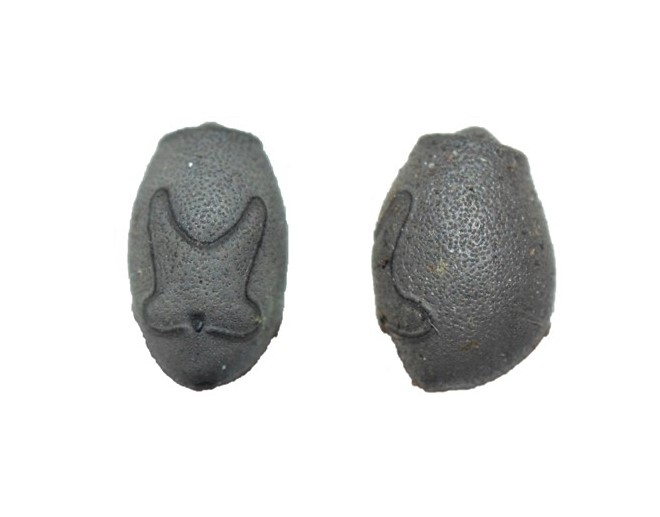
Eggs from dorsal dorsal and lateral

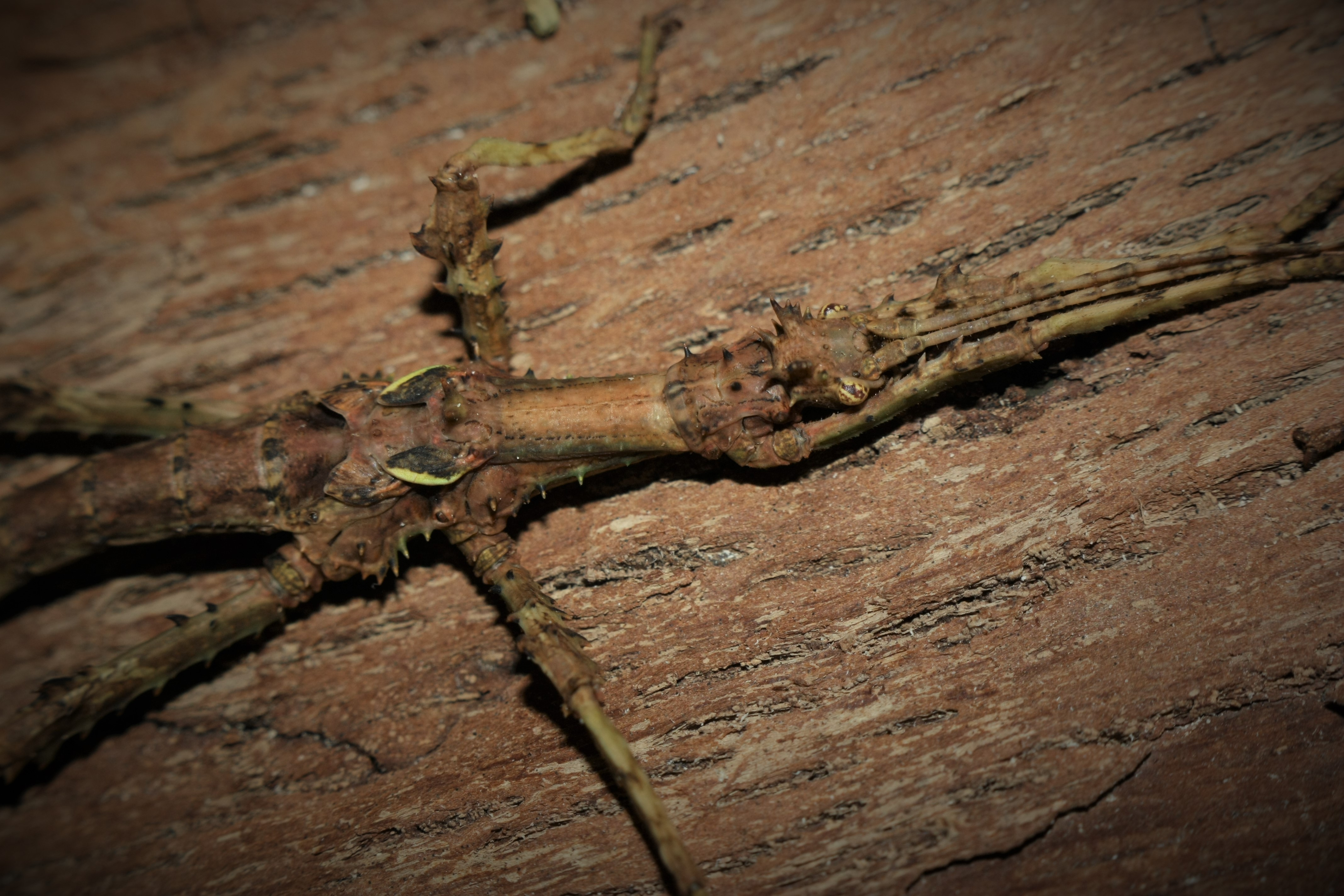
Subadult male nymph

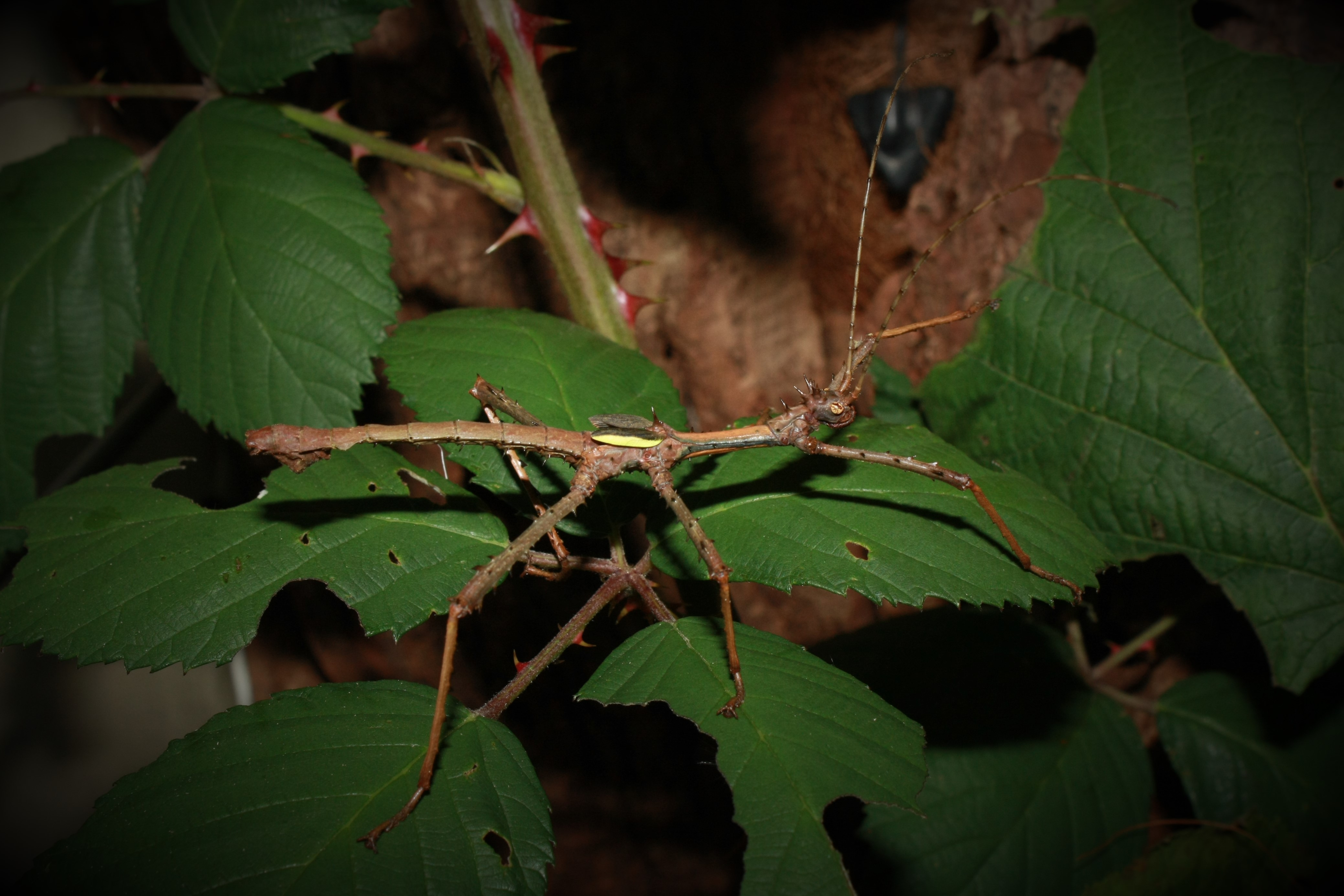
Adult male

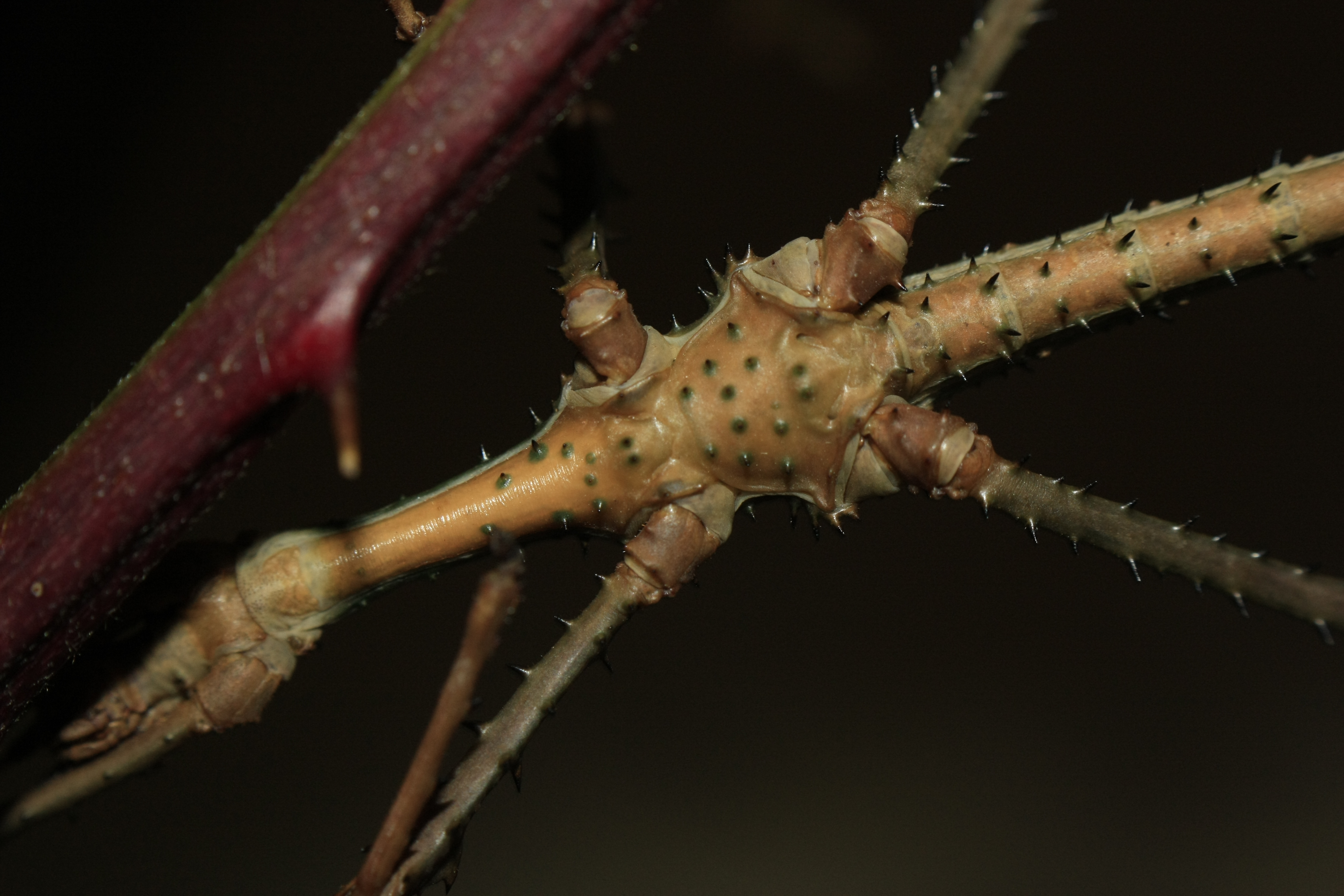
Male from below

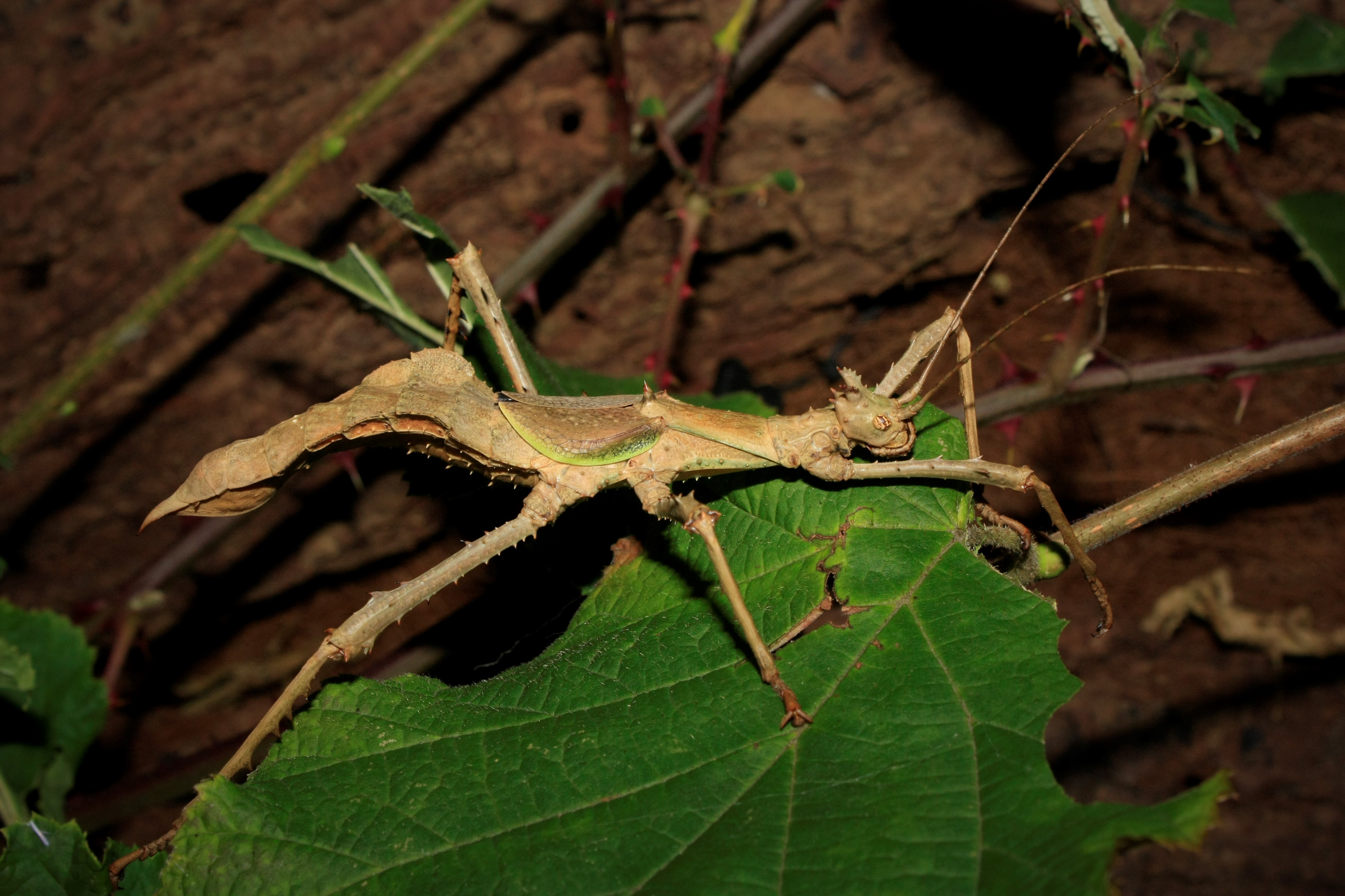
Frech adult female es Weibchen with an arched abdomen

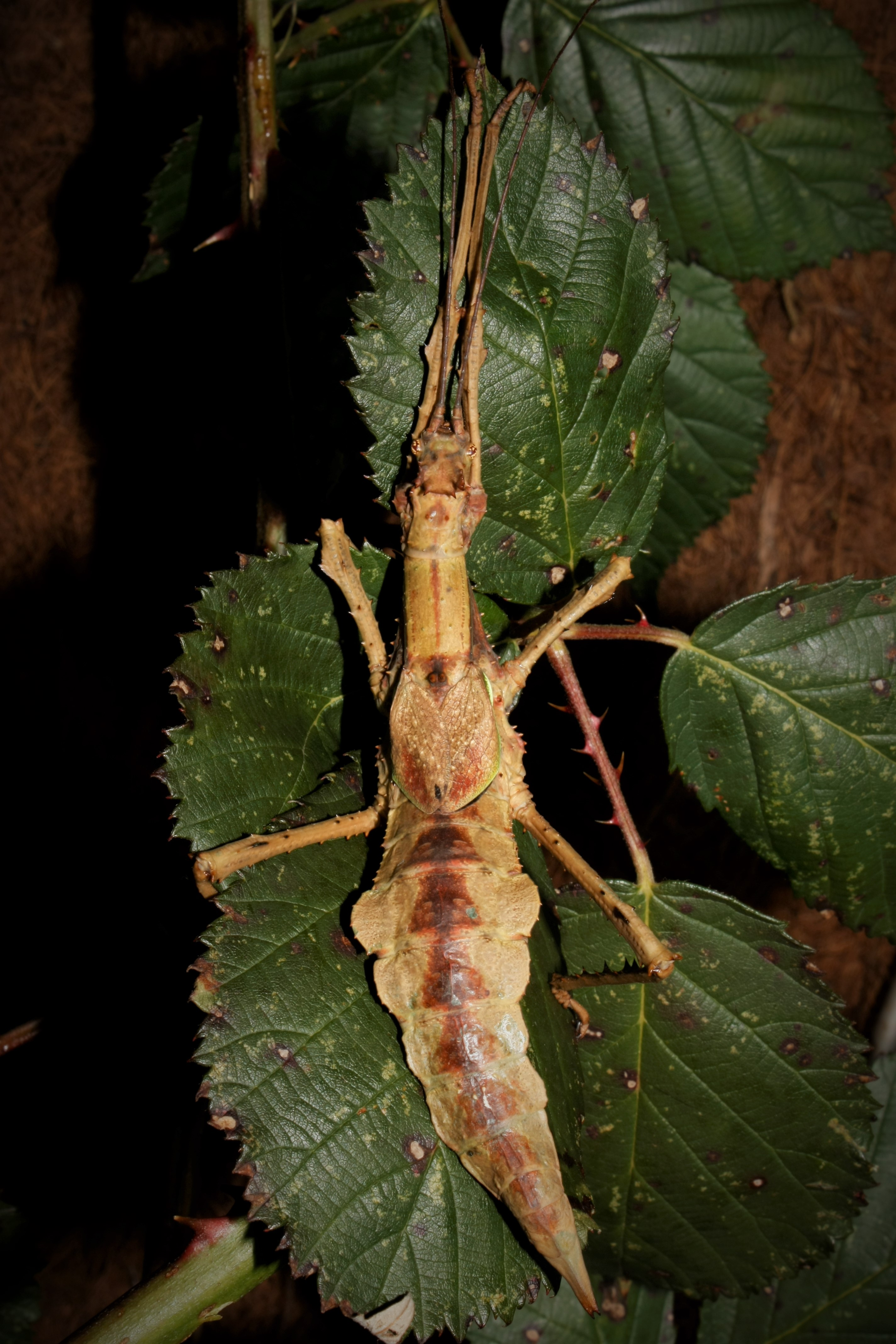
Adult female with darker night color
