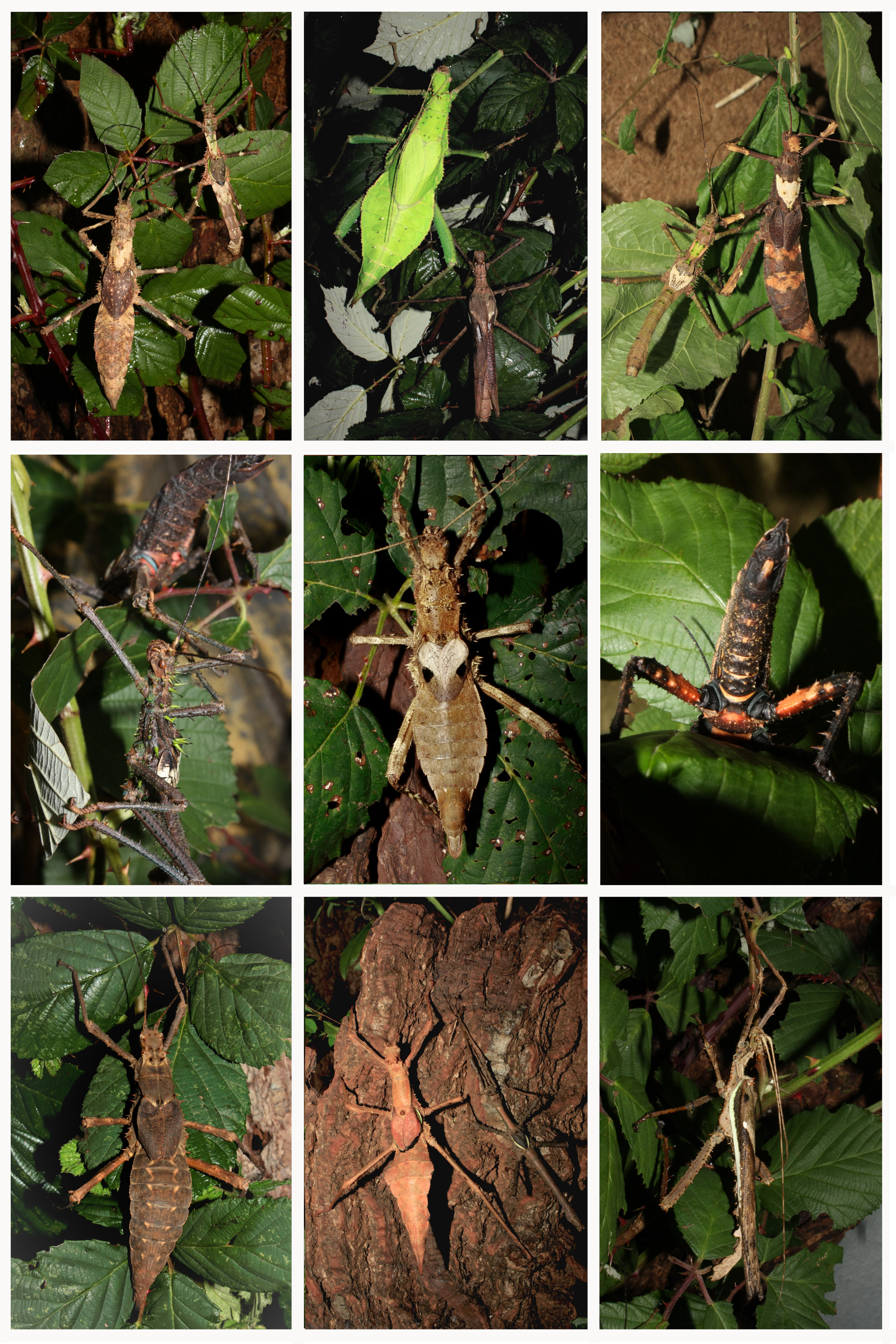
- Different species of Heteropterygini

Scientific classification
- Domain: Eukaryota
- Kingdom: Animalia
- Phylum: Arthropoda
- Class: Insecta
- Order: Phasmatodea
- Family: Heteropterygidae
- Subfamily: Heteropteryginae; Kirby, 1896
- Tribe: Heteropterygini; Kirby, 1896

Genera
- Haaniella; Heteropteryx
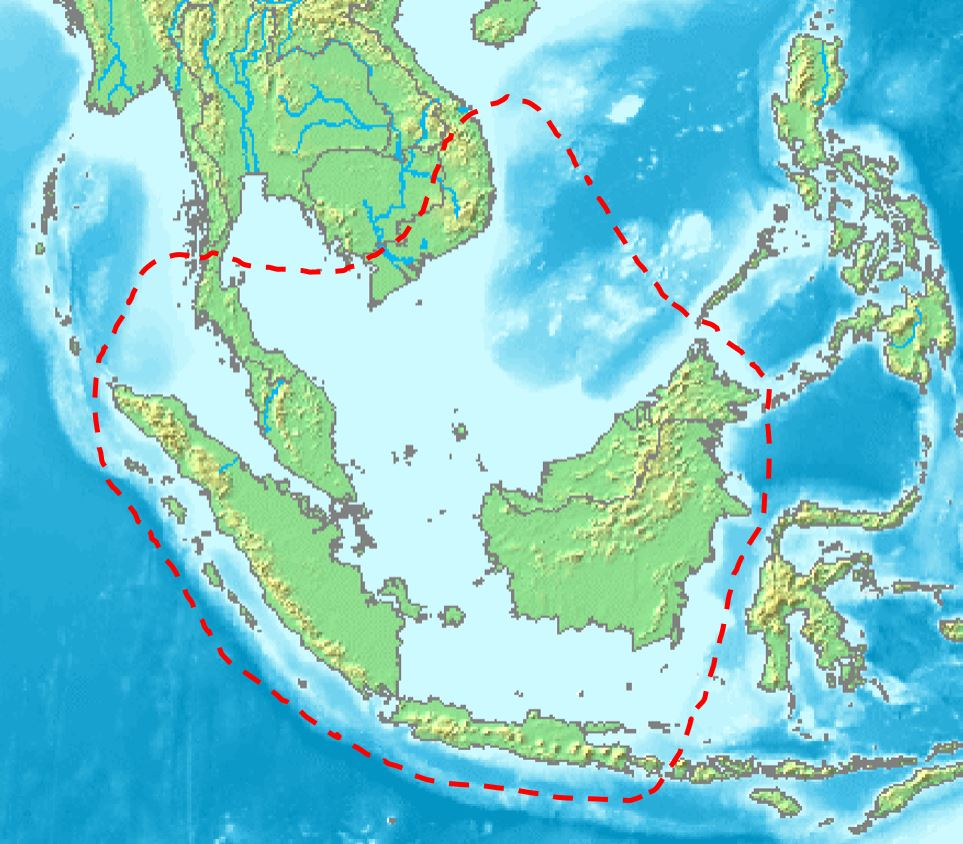
- Range of Heteropterygini

= Heteropterygini =

Heteropterygini Temporal range: 35–0 Ma Eocene to present

Tribe of stick insects

Heteropterygini is the only tribe within the subfamily of the Heteropteryginae (family Heteropterygidae; order Phasmatodea). With 19 representatives described, this subfamily includes the fewest species of the three subfamilies, but includes the largest and most striking species of the family.

== Characteristics ==
=== Size and weight ===
The representatives of the Heteropterygini are usually relatively large and heavy. Males become 2.5 to 13 cm long, females reach body lengths between 4.5 and 17 cm, with the larger species being clearly in the majority. Only the females of Haaniella parva, Haaniella kerincia and Haaniella scabra remain smaller than 8.5 cm. The males of these species are at least 2.5 to 4.0 cm and a maximum of 3.7 to 5.7 cm long. The 14 to 17 cm long females of the Heteropteryx dilatata are not only the heaviest phasmids with 30 to 70 g, but are among the heaviest insects at all.

=== Morphology ===
A characteristic of this tribe are the wings that are transformed into stridulation organs in females of all species. The short forewings, here developed as tegmina, cover the equally short hind wings and are primarily used to generate sound (defense stridulation). The wings of the males are also shortened in most species and converted into stridulation organs too. The defensive stridulation is supplemented by the lifting of the abdomen and the clapping of the thorny hind legs. When perceiving tactile stimuli the tibiae are struck like a jackknife against the femura, which aims to pinch the opponent.

In adult females, the abdomen is widened towards the middle and significantly increased due to the large numbers of eggs produced. Their abdomen ends in a pointed secondary ovipositor that surrounds the actual ovipositor. This is ventral formed from the eighth abdominal sternite, which is named subgenital plate, or also called operculum. Dorsal (anatomy)ly the ovipositor consists of the eleventh tergum called the supraanal plate or Epiproct. The smaller males have a central abdomen area that is round in cross-section, which is the thinnest here in contrast to the females. The thickened end of the abdomen is formed ventrally by the subgenital plate and dorsally by the eighth, ninth and tenth tergum, latter known as anal segment.

=== Acanthotaxy ===
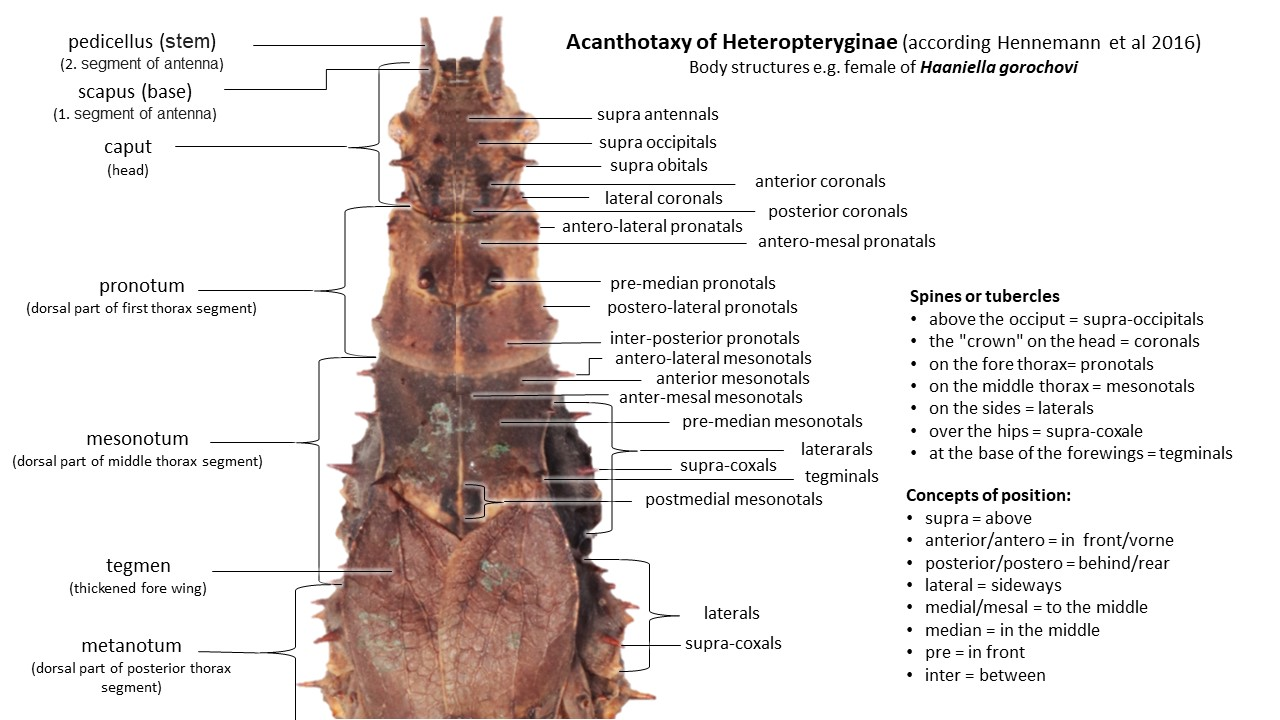
Acanthotaxy of Haaniella gorochovi, ♀

The body is covered with numerous, often pointed spines, but also tubercles. Their arrangement is typical for the subfamily. Their characteristics are very different and so species-specific that they are used to identify and delimit species. This method, known as acanthotaxy, was developed in 1939 by James Abram Garfield Rehn and his son John William Holman Rehn for the Obriminae, in 1998 and 2001 by Philip Edward Bragg for the Dataminae modified and adapted in 2016 by Frank H. Hennemann et al. for the Heteropteryginae. The respective structures are named according to their location. The spines, which are located on the conically shaped apex of the head, which is typical for Heteropteryginae, act like a crown and are therefore called coronals (Corona Latin for wreath or crown). The ones above the base of the antennae are called supraantenals, those on the occiput are called supraoccipital. Spines on the pro-, meso- and metanotum are referred to as pronotals, mesonatals and metanotals, respectively. Spines on the meso- and metapleura are generally referred to as laterals and the individual spines above their coxae are referred to as supracoxals.

== Distribution area ==
The distribution area of the Heteropteryginae extends from the south of Vietnam over the Thailand part of the Malay Peninsula and includes Borneo, Sumatra and Java the Greater Sunda Islands except Sulawesi. Of the Lesser Sunda Islands only Bali is inhabited. The eastern limit of distribution thus corresponds to the southern course of the Huxley Line, without including Palawan in the north.

== Reproduction and life cycle ==
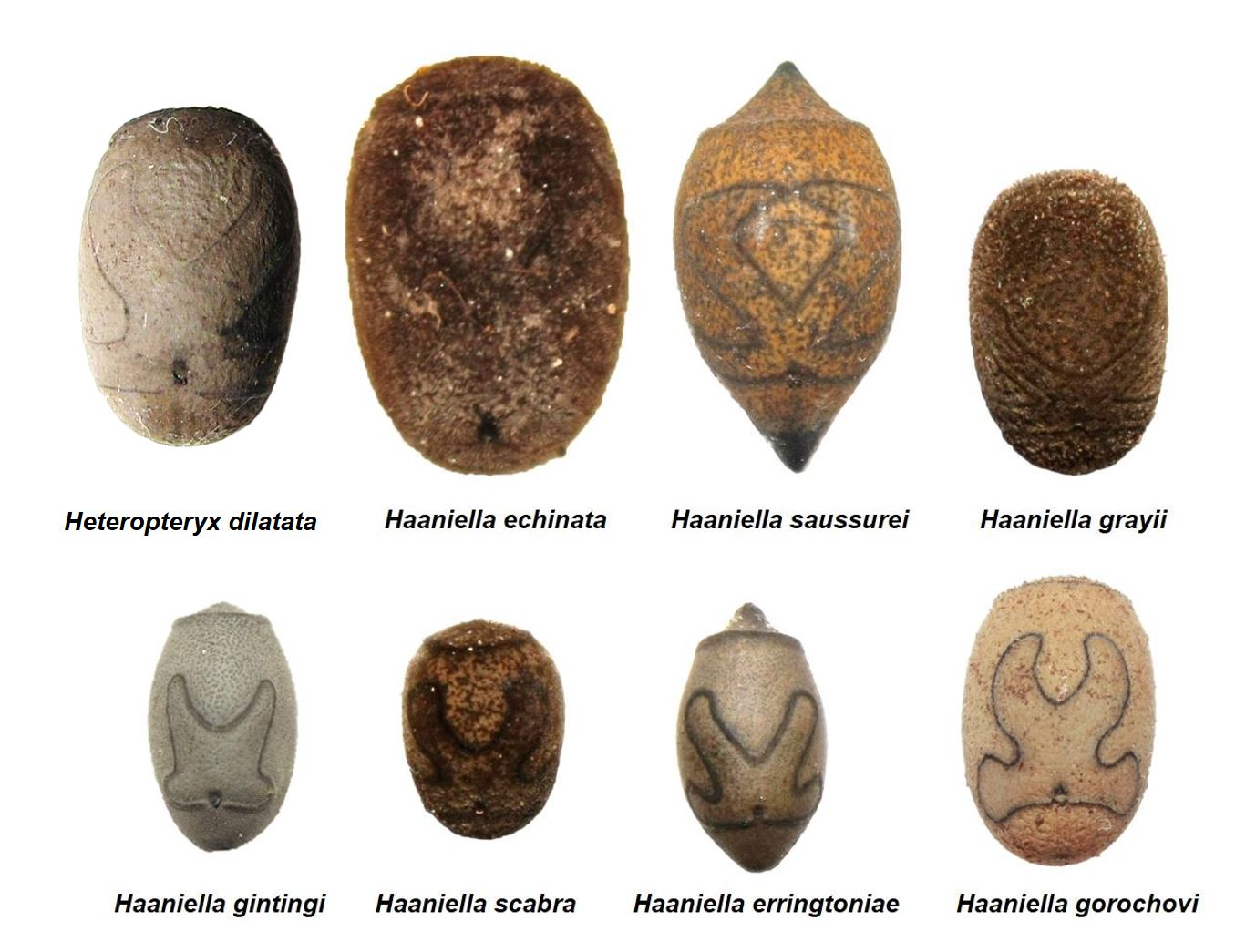
Eggs of eight Heteropteryginae species

The adult females usually lay their relatively large eggs individually, several centimeters deep in the ground using the ovipositor. The eggs, between 6 and 12 mm long and 4.5 to 7 mm wide, are considered to be the heaviest insect eggs. Their shape is typically egg-shaped with either a blunt or a pointed lower pole. It looks similar with the lid (operculum). It is circular and can be raised flat or slightly pointed in the middle. The micropyle is located between the two lower arms of a four-armed micropylar plate. These four arms are aligned in an x-shape, whereby the lower arms are usually shorter and lie next to each other at a larger angle or even in a line. In some species the arms are extended at the ends, in others around the point of intersection. Depending on the species, it takes 6 to 12 months until the nymphs hatching. It takes usually a similar period of time until they are adult. In addition to species with an average life expectancy, there are species that reach an age that is astonishing for phasmids at up to five years.

== Taxonomy ==
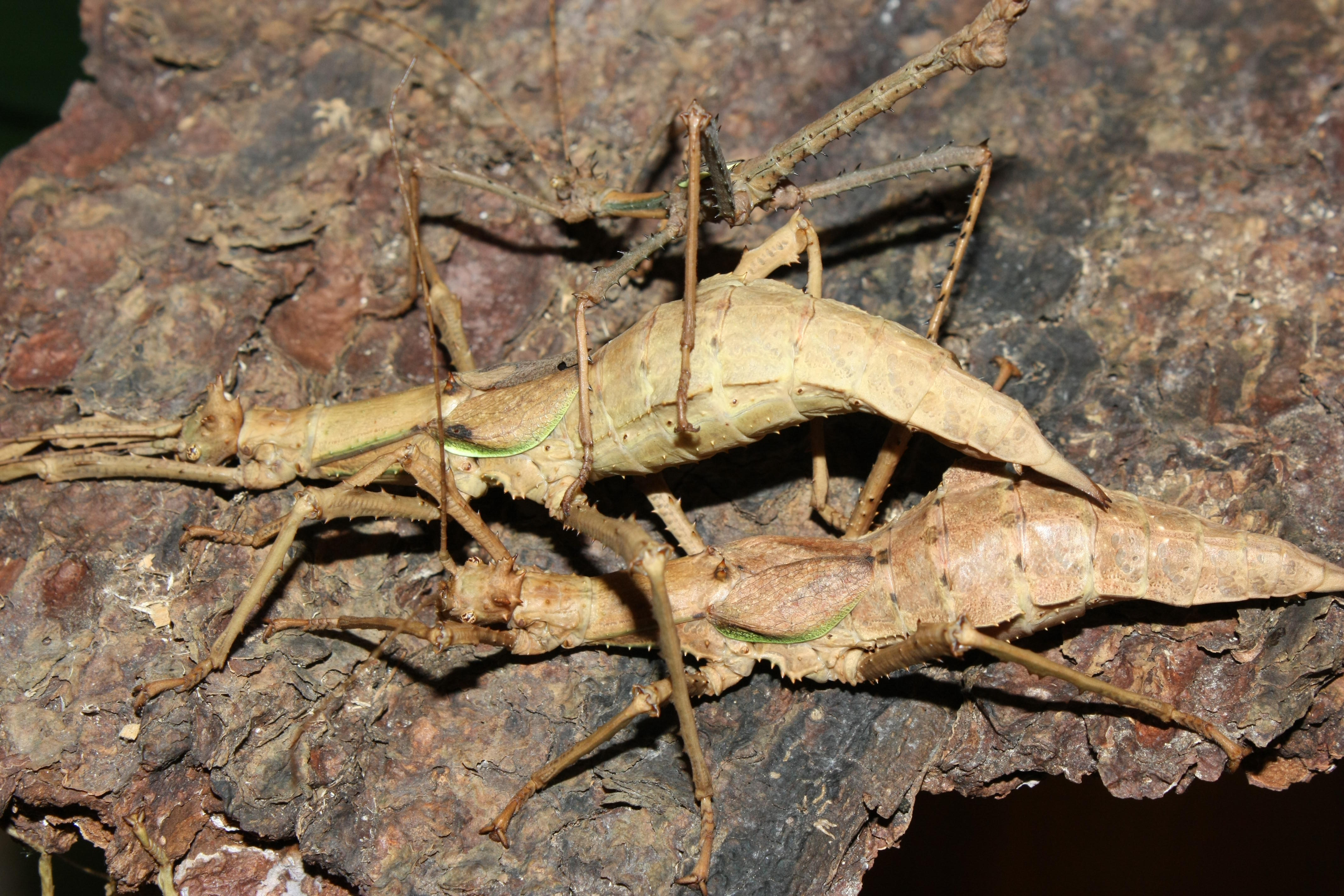
Haaniella gintingi, ♀♀ & ♂

- - Haaniella saussurei
  - - - - Haaniella gorochovi
        - Haaniella gintingi
      - - Haaniella erringtoniae
        - - Heteropteryx sp. 'Khao Lak'
          - Heteropteryx dilatata
            = Heteropteryx dilatata 'Kuala Boh'
    - - - Haaniella scabra
        - Haaniella grayii
      - - Haaniella dehaanii
        - - - Haaniella echinata 'Similajau'
            - Haaniella echinata 'Mulu'
          - Haaniella echinata 'Brunei'
            = Haaniella echinata 'Tenom'
            = Haaniella echinata 'Kiansom'
            = Haaniella echinata 'Luyang'

Relationships of the examined Heteropteryginae species by Sarah Bank et al. (2021)

William Forsell Kirby established the subfamily Heteropteryginae within the family Bacillidae for the genus Heteropteryx in 1896. In 1904 he closed all genera of the then known today's Heteropterygidae, as well as the genus Parectatosoma into this subfamily. Josef Redtenbacher introduced the genera in 1906 Heteropteryx, Leocrates (today synonym to Heteropteryx) and again Parectatosoma, as well as the newly established Anisacantha in the tribe Heteropterygini. Klaus Günther transferred the two tribes Obrimini and Datamini to the subfamily Heteropteryginae in 1953. He placed their previous Southeast Asian genera Heteropteryx and Leocrates in the Heteroperygini. For the Malagasy genera Parectatosoma and Anisacantha he established the Anisacanthini. In 2004 Oliver Zompro raised the subfamily Heteropteryginae to the rank a family. Of the four included tribes, three were placed in the rank of subfamilies of the Heteropterygidae, while the Malagasy species were transferred to the newly established family Anisacanthidae. For the subfamily Heteropteryginae, the Heteropterygini were established as the only tribe. Zompro dividesd the Heteropterygini in three genera. Since the study of this group by Hennemann et al. in 2016 it is only divided into two genera by the synonymization of the genus Miniopteryx discriebed by Zompro. In the first genetic analysis for clarification of the phylogeny of a phasmid family were described by Sarah Bank et al. in sum seven mitochondrial genes and gene from the cell nucleus examined to clarify relationship within this family as well as their phylogenetic classification in other phasmid groups. The result showed that the representatives of the Heteropterigini form a common clade, but the genus Heteropteryx is phylogenetically placed in the middle of several lines of species currently listed in Haaniella. Following this, either Haaniella would have to be split up into several genera or withdrawn in favor of the previously described genus Heteropteryx. The latter appears more likely due to the lack of larger autapomorphic differences.

Valid species are:

- Haaniella Kirby, 1904

(syn. = Heteropteryx Redtenbacher, 1906)
(syn. = Miniopteryx Zompro, 2004)
- Haaniella aculeata Hennemann, Conle, Brock & Seow-Choen, 2016
- Haaniella azlini Seow-Choen, 2018
- Haaniella dehaanii (Westwood, 1859)
- Haaniella echinata (Redtenbacher, 1906)
- Haaniella erringtoniae (Redtenbacher, 1906)
- Haaniella gintingi Hennemann, Conle, Brock & Seow-Choen, 2016
- Haaniella glaber (Redtenbacher, 1906)
- Haaniella gorochovi Hennemann, Conle, Brock & Seow-Choen, 2016
- Haaniella grayii (Westwood, 1859)
- Haaniella jacobsoni Günther, 1944
- Haaniella kerincia Hennemann, Conle, Brock & Seow-Choen, 2016
- Haaniella macroptera Hennemann, Conle, Brock & Seow-Choen, 2016
- Haaniella mecheli (Redtenbacher, 1906)
- Haaniella muelleri (de Haan, 1842)
- Haaniella parva Günther, 1944
- Haaniella rosenbergii (Kaup, 1871)
- Haaniella saussurei Kirby, 1904
- Haaniella scabra (Redtenbacher, 1906)

- Heteropteryx Gray, G. R., 1835

(syn. = Leocrates Stål, 1875)
- Heteropteryx dilatata (Parkinson, 1798)
