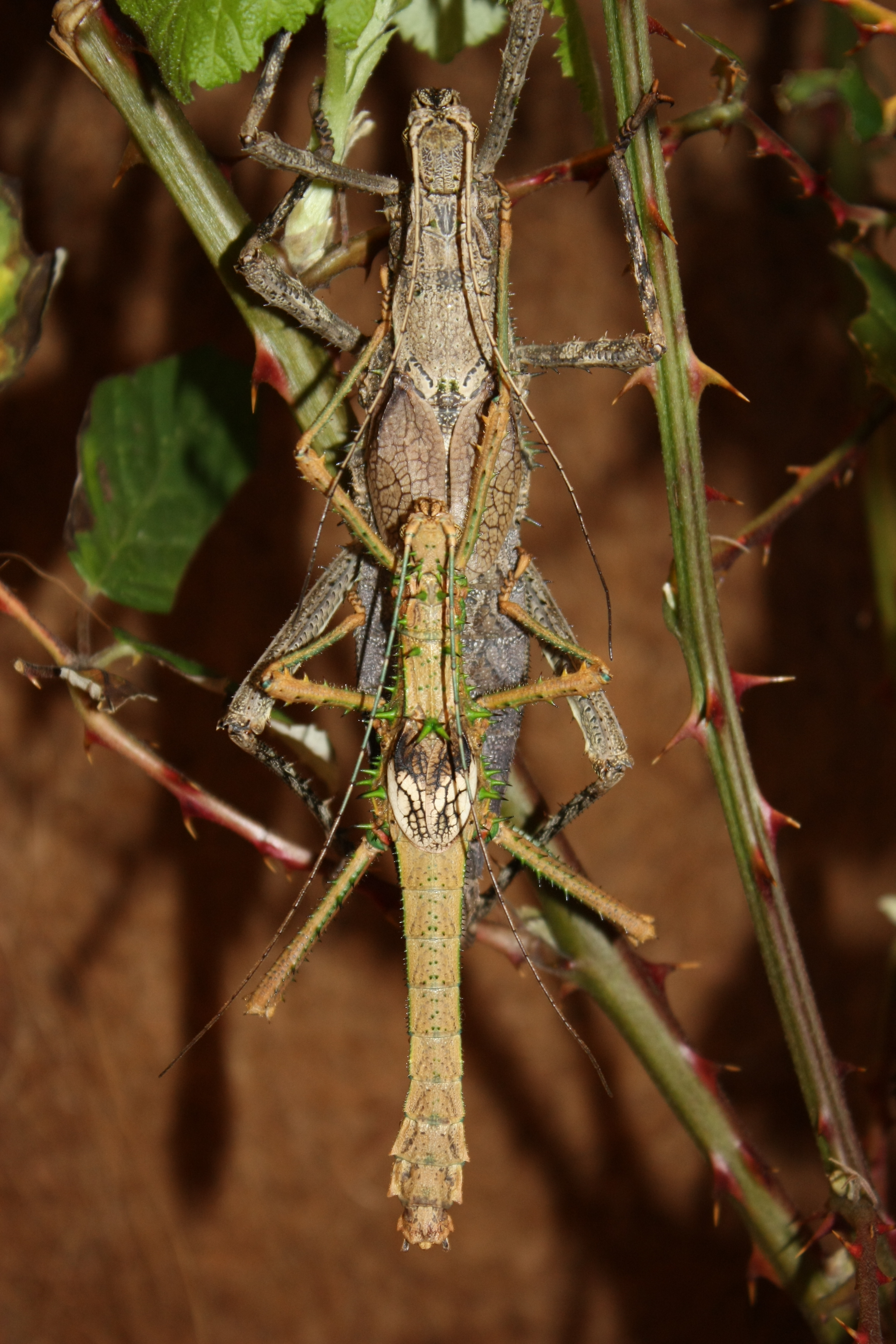
- Haaniella saussurei, pair

Scientific classification
- Domain: Eukaryota
- Kingdom: Animalia
- Phylum: Arthropoda
- Class: Insecta
- Order: Phasmatodea
- Family: Heteropterygidae
- Subfamily: Heteropteryginae
- Tribe: Heteropterygini
- Genus: Haaniella
- Species: H. saussurei

Binomial name
- Haaniella saussurei Kirby, 1904

Synonyms
- Haaniella echidna Rehn, J. W. H., 1938; Heteropteryx grayi Saussure, 1869; Heteropteryx saussurei Redtenbacher, 1906

= Haaniella saussurei =

Species of stick insect

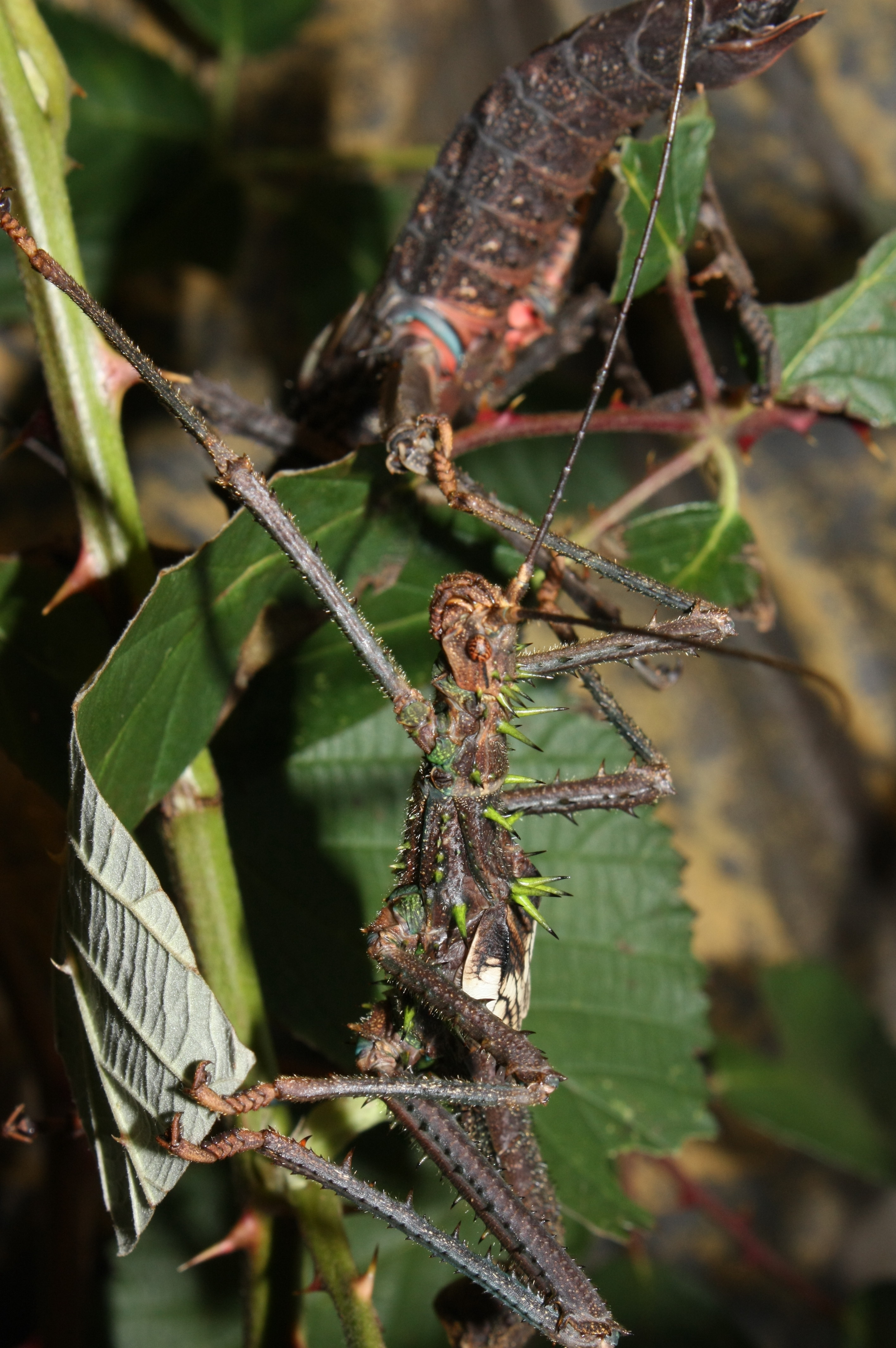
Portrait of a male and underside of abdomen of a subadult female nymph in background

Haaniella saussurei is a species of stick insect native to Borneo and a typical representative of the subfamily Heteropteryginae. The occasionally used common name Saussure's Haaniella refers to the species name.

== Description ==
As is typical for most of the species of the genus Haaniella, both sexes of Haaniella saussurei have many sharp thorns on the body and legs and very short wings. The front wings, which are designed as tegmina, completely cover the short hind wings (alae). The latter are transformed into stridulation organs and are used to ward off enemies. The females are often patterned in contrasting light and dark brown, but can also only be dark. With increasing age, the contrast in the patterned females decreases and the animals become darker. Egg-laying females have a conspicuously plump abdomen, the end of which is formed by a spike-like laying apparatus that surrounds the actual ovipositor. The dorsal end segment of this ovipositor is formed by the eleventh tergum. This structure, known as the supraanal plate, is characterized by four fine teeth at the end in the females of Haaniella saussurei. Older juvenile stages have strong pink colored membranes in the area of the hind and middle coxae and partly also on the membranes of the abdominal segments. The hind and mid-coxae themselves are light to steel blue. This striking coloring serves as a warning, as the animals defend themselves with their thorny hind legs. The hind legs are extended in the air together with the abdomen and fold when touched, so that they pinch an attacker. Females are significantly larger than males at 127 to 132 millimetres (5.0 to 5.2 in). These are much slimmer, much more spiny on the back and only about 82 to 92 millimetres (3.2 to 3.6 in) long. They are usually dark brown immediately after the imaginal molt, but then often become very light. Their fore wings are dark brown at the base and almost white on the lateral edges. The middle and rear portions are also white with dark brown veining. The spines and synovial membranes are often striking green. Both in the coloring of the body and the wings, they are very similar to the males of Haaniella grayii, although these usually show even more intense shades of green. However, while Haaniella grayii has a pair of long spines on the mesonotum in addition to the characteristic four spines at the end in front and in the middle, Haaniella saussurei lacks the pair of spines in the middle of the mesonotum. In adult males, not only the green spines are conspicuous, but also the green, sometimes turquoise-green joint areas, especially on the hind coxae, which are particularly prominent there due to the red thigh ring.

== Distribution and reproduction ==
The distribution area of Haaniella saussurei is limited to the coastal areas in the west of Borneo. Here the species was found in the southwest of the Malaysian state of Sarawak. Females lay lemon-shaped, hairless eggs in the ground. These are 9 to 12 millimetres (0.35 to 0.47 in) long, 7 millimetres (0.28 in) high and about6 millimetres (0.24 in) wide.

== Taxonomy ==
In 1869, Henri de Saussure assigned a female he had studied to the Heteropteryx grayii (now Haaniella grayii) described ten years earlier by John Obadiah Westwood, but points out some differences. In 1904, William Forsell Kirby described the genus Haaniella in which he created a separate species for the female studied by Saussure, which he named Haaniella saussurei in honor of Saussure. The female deposited in the Natural History Museum of Geneva is thus the holotype of the species, as well as the hololectotype described by Saussure of its first synonym Heteropteryx grayi Saussure, 1869. Also, among the five types of Haaniella grayi classified as "Westwood's types", of the four specimens deposited at the Oxford University Museum of Natural History, only the female lectotype is actually a representative of Haaniella grayii, while the female and two male paralectotypes are Haaniella saussurei. In 1906, Josef Redtenbacher took the view that the animals belonged to the genus Heteropteryx and designated them accordingly. As with many other species, he added "nov. spec.", which, according to today's understanding, is an indication of a new description and has led to another synonym. What was meant was probably the new combination of genus and species names (common today: comb. nov.). In 1938, John W. H. Rehn assigned the female described by Kirby as Haaniella saussurei to Haaniella echinata and thus synonymousized Haaniella saussurei. At the same time he described the species Haaniella echidna using a male from the collection of Morgan Hebard deposited at the Academy of Natural Sciences of Drexel University in Philadelphia. This was placed by Klaus Günther in 1944 as a subspecies of Haaniella echinata. He also considered the species described by Kirby to be a subspecies and named it Haaniella echinata saussurei. He does not name Kirby as the author of the subspecies, but Redtenbacher. Philip E. Bragg recognized Haaniella saussurei as an independent valid species again in 1992 and also transferred Haaniella echidna, which Daniel Otte had raised again to species status in 1978, as a synonym for this.

Frank H. Hennemann et al. divided the genus into three species groups in 2016. Haaniella saussurei has been assigned to the "echinata" species group along with Haaniella echinata and Haaniella scabra. This assignment could not be confirmed by a molecular genetic study from 2021. Sarah Bank et al. included, among others, at least five species from Borneo in their study and showed that Haaniella saussurei has a special position within the genus, while the other species from Borneo are relatively closely related.

== In terraristics ==
Haaniella saussurei first appeared in terraristics in the second half of the 1990s. The breeding stocks go back to specimens collected by Philip E. Bragg and Ian Abercrombie in 1994 in Sarawak, more precisely in Tarum near Debak. The species was assigned PSG number 177 by the Phasmid Study Group.

Medium-sized terrariums are required to keep Haaniella saussurei. In these, a substrate that is suitable for laying eggs and is always slightly moist should cover the terrarium floor by 5 to 10 centimetres (2.0 to 3.9 in). The humidity and temperature in the terrarium should be rather high in order to do justice to the tropical origin of the animals. It eats leaves of Rosaceae such as bramble and also of ivy, oak, eucalyptus and Salal.

== Gallery ==
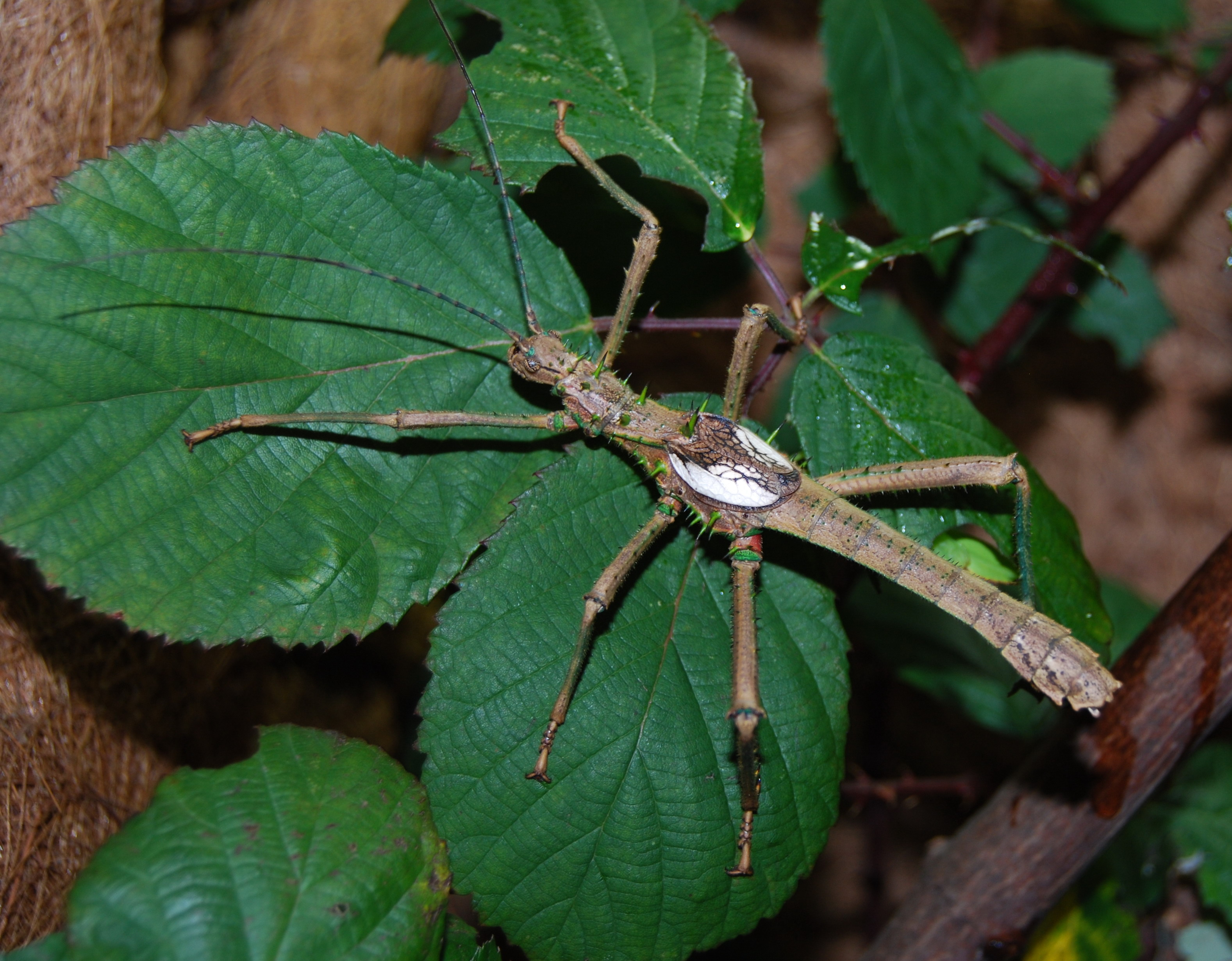
Male

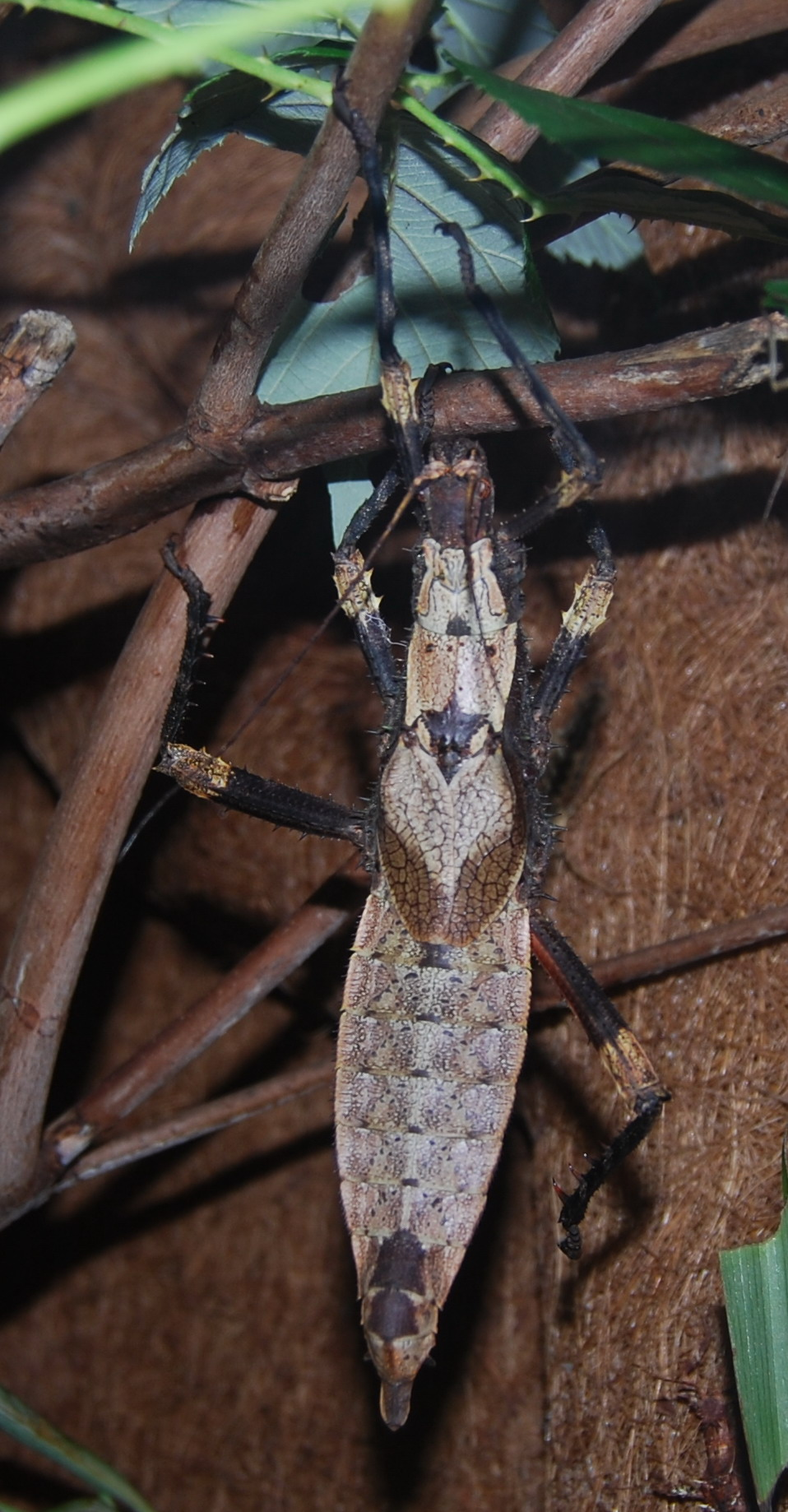
contrasting drawn female

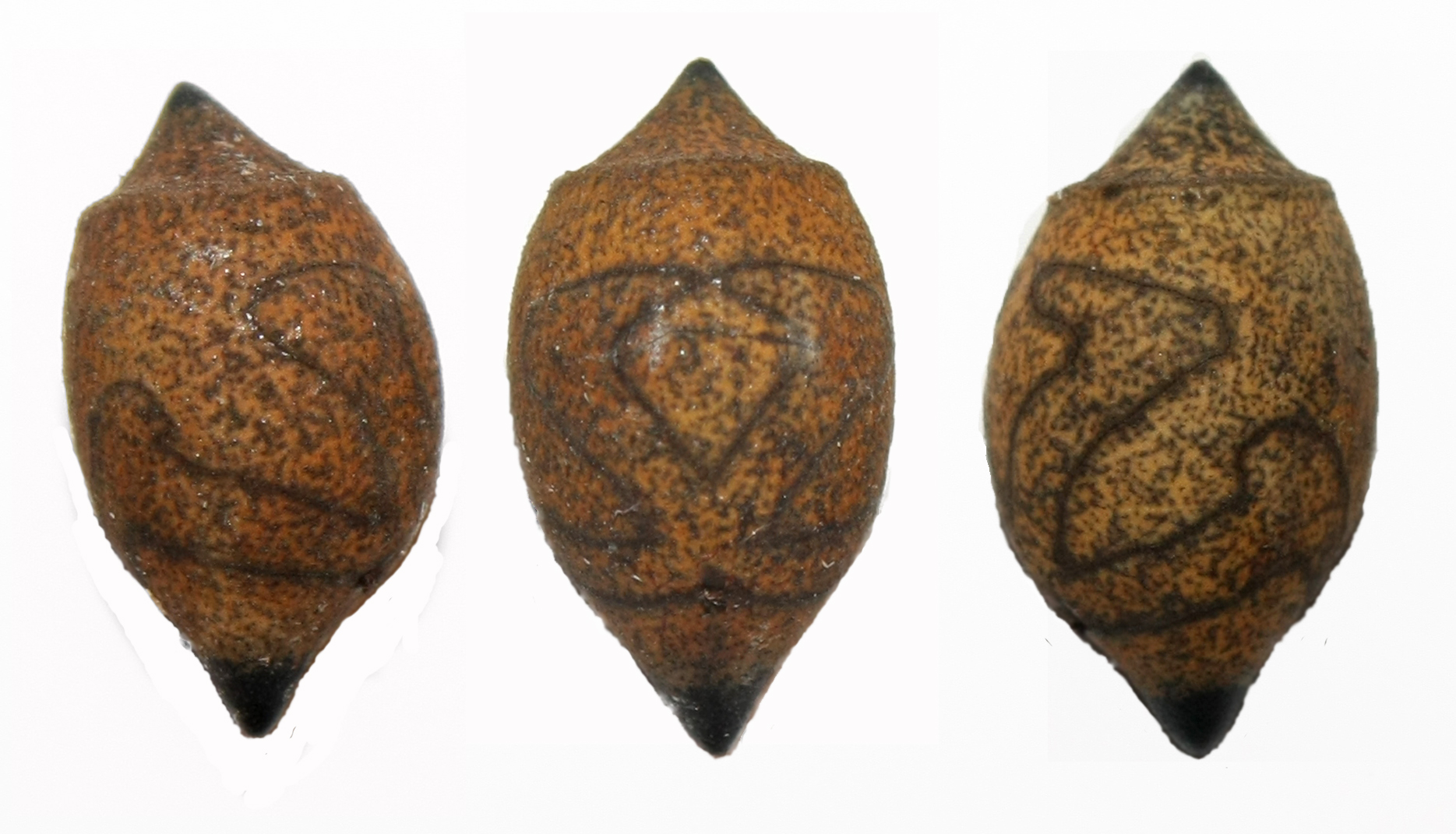
Eggs

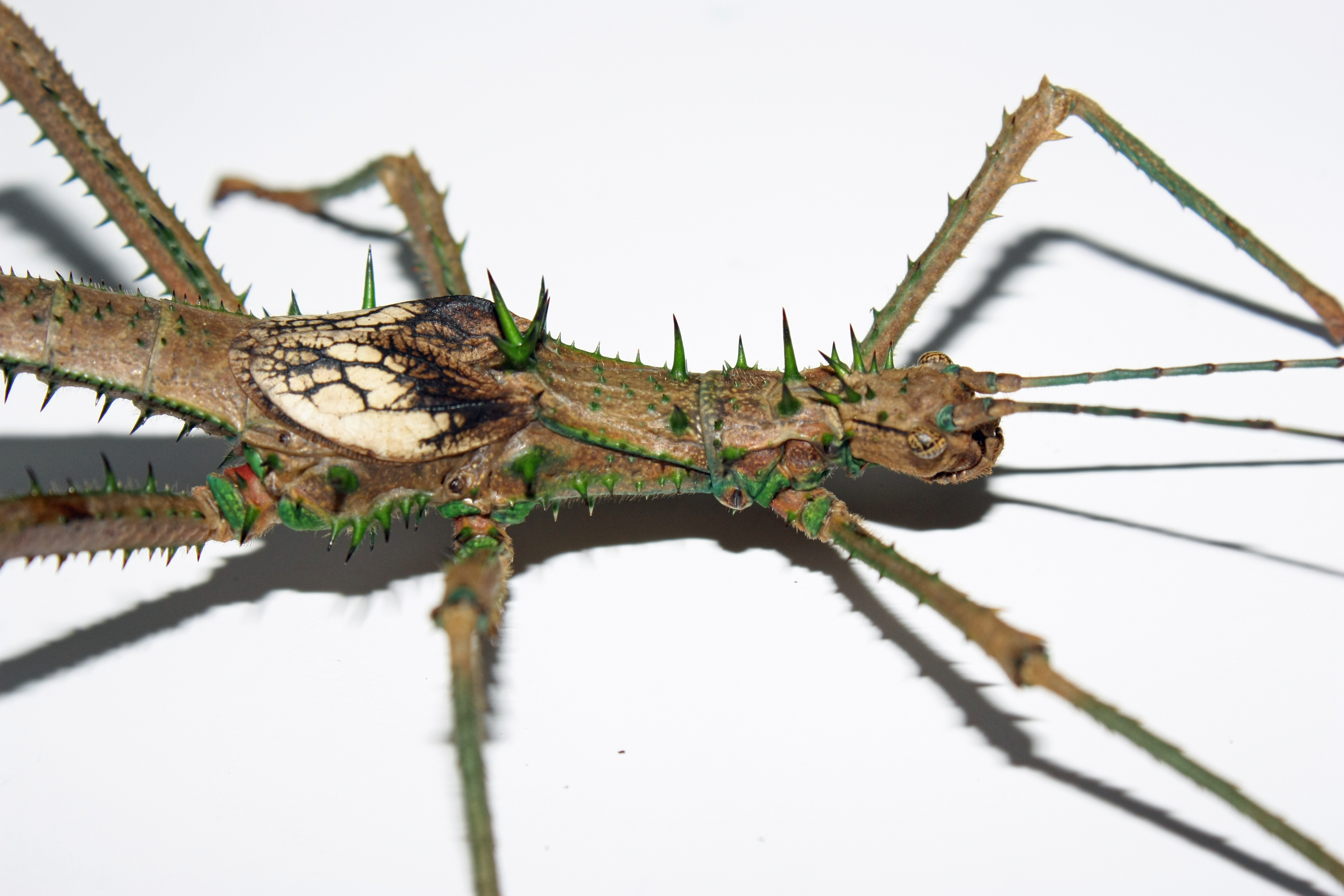
Arrangement of the thoracic spines in a male
