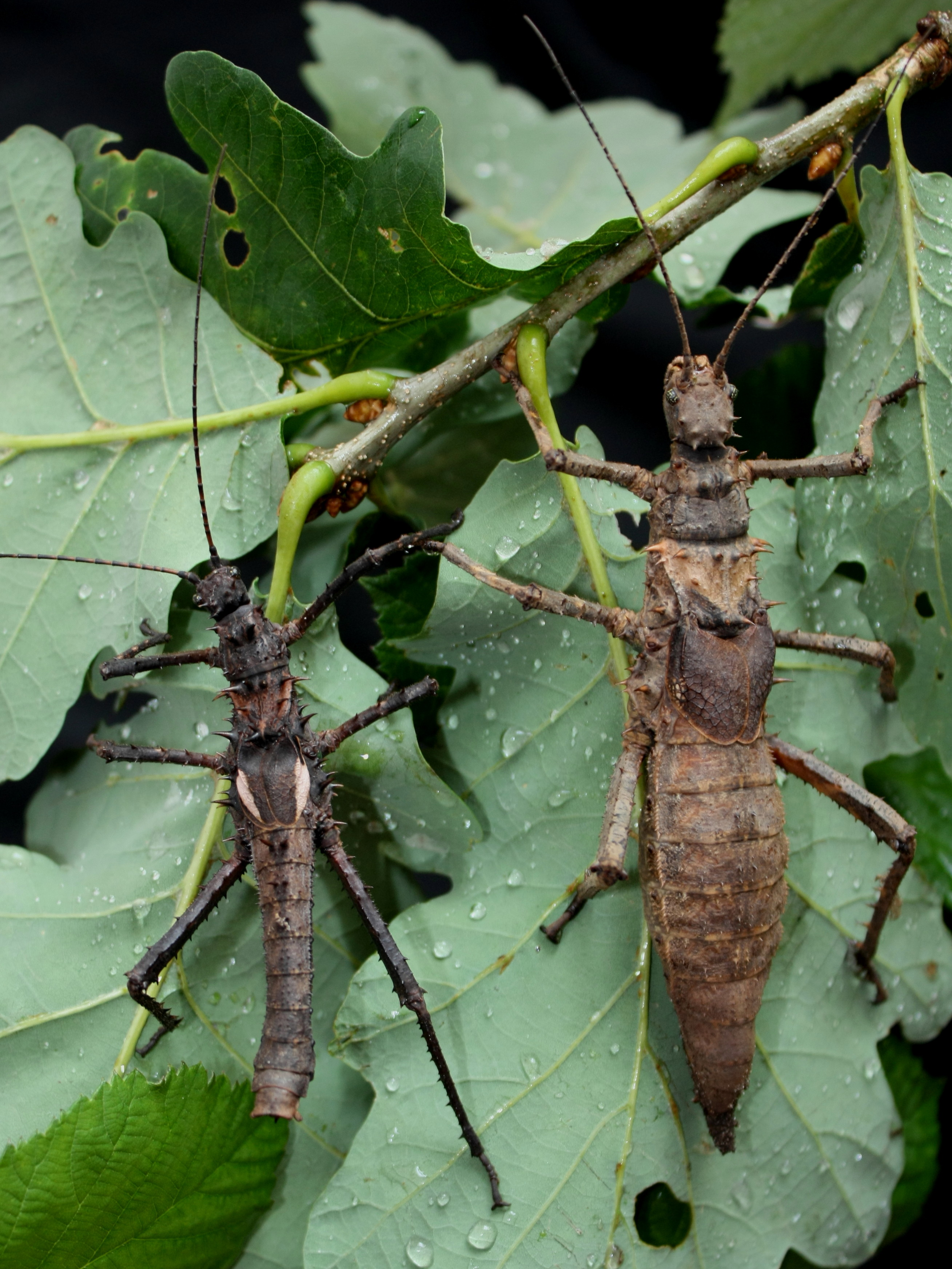
- Haaniella dehaanii, pair

Scientific classification
- Kingdom: Animalia
- Phylum: Arthropoda
- Class: Insecta
- Order: Phasmatodea
- Family: Heteropterygidae
- Subfamily: Heteropteryginae
- Tribe: Heteropterygini
- Genus: Haaniella
- Species: H. dehaanii

Binomial name
- Haaniella dehaanii (Westwood, 1859)

Synonyms
- Heteropteryx dehaanii Westwood, 1859; Heteropteryx dehaani Redtenbacher, 1906; Heteropteryx dipsacus Redtenbacher, 1906

= Haaniella dehaanii =

Species of stick insect

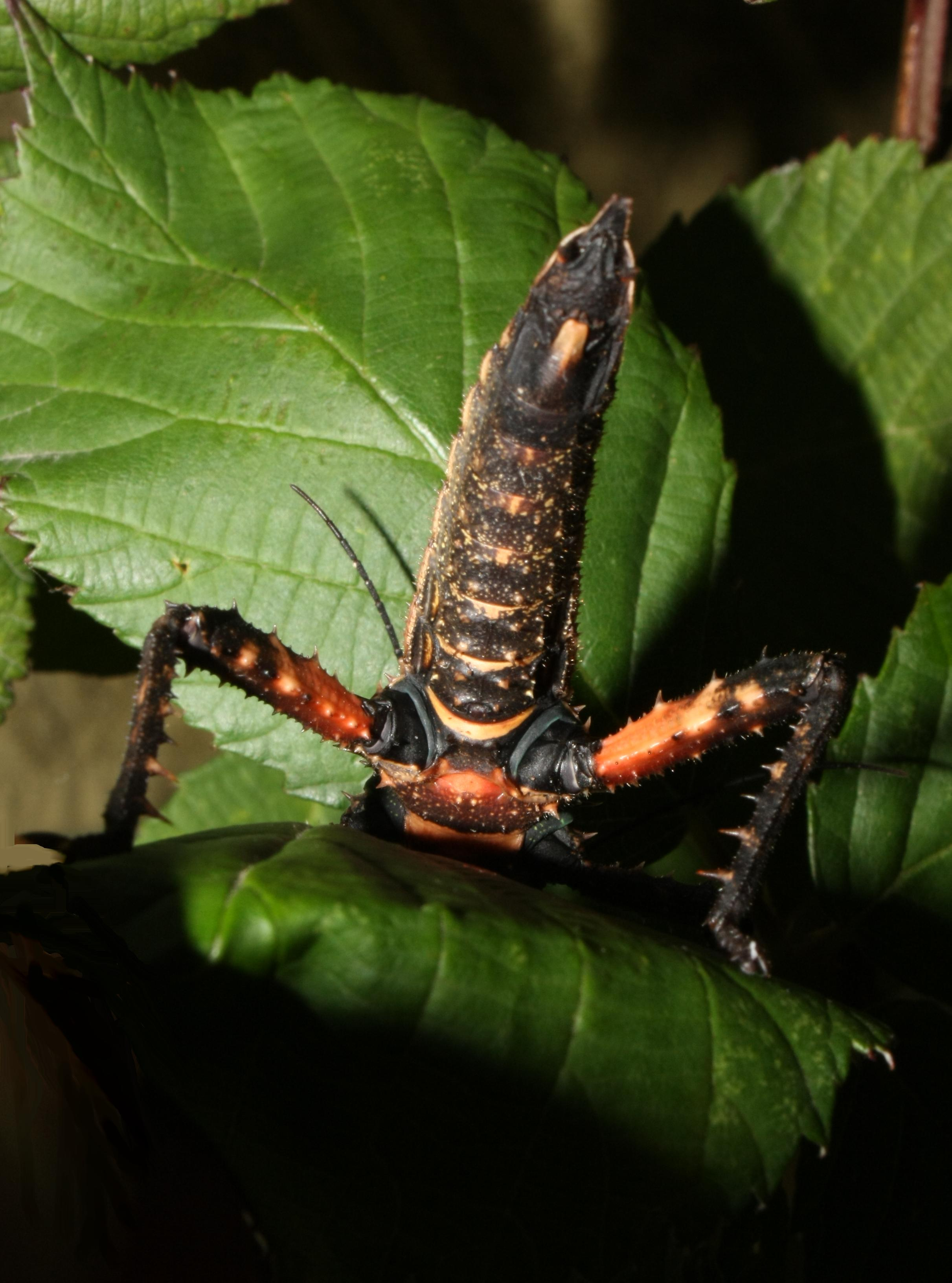
Underside of the abdomen of a female nymph

Haaniella dehaanii is a stick insect species. It is a typical representative of the subfamily Heteropteryginae. The occasionally used common name De Haan's haaniella refers to the species name.

== Description ==
Both sexes, like all species of this genus, have many pointed spines on their bodies and legs. The shortened tegmina has developed front wings completely cover the just as shortened hind wings. Females are dark brown in color and very compact in shape. The abdomen of egg-laying specimens in particular bulge in shape. The abdomen ends in a spike-like secondary ovipositor. Characteristic is a triangular or oval area in front of the wings, which is white to beige in the otherwise black-brown female nymph and only light brown to beige in the adult, then-brown females. In contrast to the top, the bottom is very vividly drawn. Female nymphs in particular have bright orange areas on the undersides of the femura, the meso- and metathorax, the intermediate membranes of the abdominal segments and other smaller orange areas on the sternites of the abdomen itself. Females are larger than males, being 90 to 110 millimetres (3.5 to 4.3 in) long. The males are much slimmer, very prickly and only about 65 to 75 millimetres (2.6 to 3.0 in) long. They are mostly dark brown in color and thus more closely resemble the nymphs in their coloration. With them, the front edge of the tegmina is often drawn lightly, which results in two short, light lines at the lateral edge of the wings.

== Distribution area and lifestyle ==
The species is native to Sarawak on Borneo, where it occurs on Mount Serapi, a few kilometers west of Kuching.

The nocturnal animals hide in the leaves of the forest floor during the day. At night they climb up the food plants in order to feed on them, often eating the leaves directly on the leaf base. In case of danger, the species shows the defensive behavior typical of all members of the subfamily Heteropteryginae, including stridulation with wings and flapping with the spiny hind legs.

== Reproduction ==
About eight weeks after the insects have molted to become adults, the females begin to lay eggs. The barrel-shaped to spherical, brown eggs are sunk a few centimeters deep into the ground with theovipositor at night. They are 7 millimetres (0.28 in) long and 5.5 to 5.9 millimetres (0.22 to 0.23 in) wide. As with most Haaniella species, they are provided with fine and short hairs so that they appear to have a velvety surface. The cruciform micropylar plate is difficult to see because of the hairs. The micropyle is located in the lower angle of the cross formed from diagonal arms. It can take a whole year for the nymphs to hatch. It takes another nine months for them to grow into imago. After that, the animals can live for up to two years, with the productivity of the females gradually decreasing.

== Taxonomy ==
In 1859 John Obadiah Westwood described the species as Heteropteryx dehaanii, using the specific name in honor of the Dutch zoologist Wilhem de Haan has chosen. After the species was first transferred to the new genus Haaniella by William Forsell Kirby in 1904, Klaus Günther placed it in 1944 as a subspecies of the somewhat lighter colored and larger species Haaniella grayii. This assignment was canceled in 1992 by Philip Edward Bragg and the species has been considered valid since then. A species described by Josef Redtenbacher as Heteropteryx dipsacus in 1906 was also classified by Günther as a subspecies of Haaniella grayi. Bragg was able to prove in 1998 that the specimens described under this name are Haaniella dehaanii, whereby Heteropteryx dipsacus was recognized as a synonym of the same.

An adult female is deposited in the Natural History Museum, London as holotype.

== In terraristics ==
Haniella dehaanii has been in breeding since 1990/91 and is listed under PSG number 126 by the Phasmid Study Group.

In addition to temperatures of 20 to 27 °C (68 to 81 °F), the animals primarily need high humidity and therefore prefer glass terrariums with little ventilation. The floor should be covered 5 to 10 centimetres (2.0 to 3.9 in) high with a slightly damp substrate to allow the eggs to be laid. Leaves of bramble, other Rosaceae, as well as those of oak, hazel and ivy are eaten. Hiding places in the form of pieces of bark or others should be available.

== Gallery ==
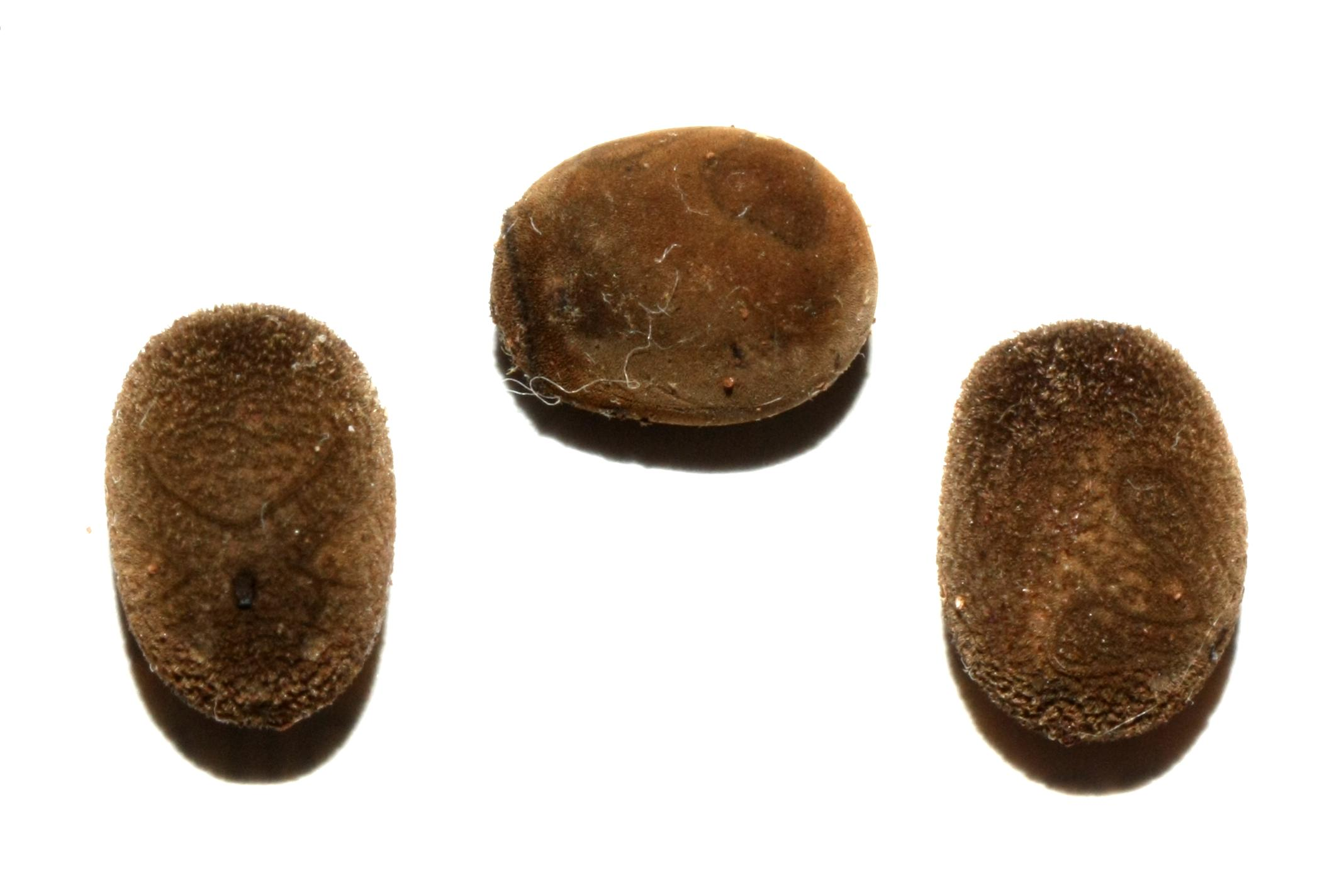
Eggs

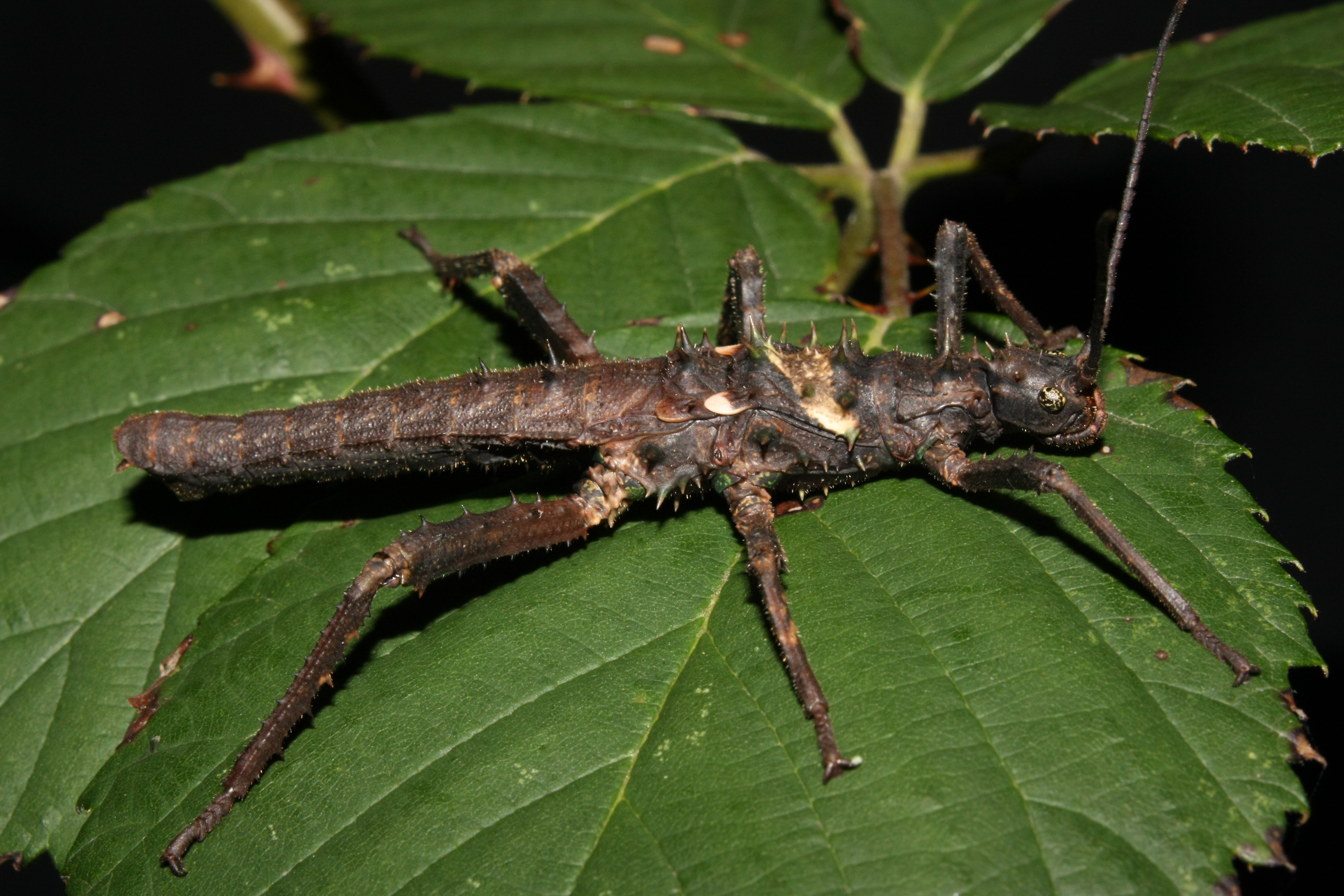
male nymph

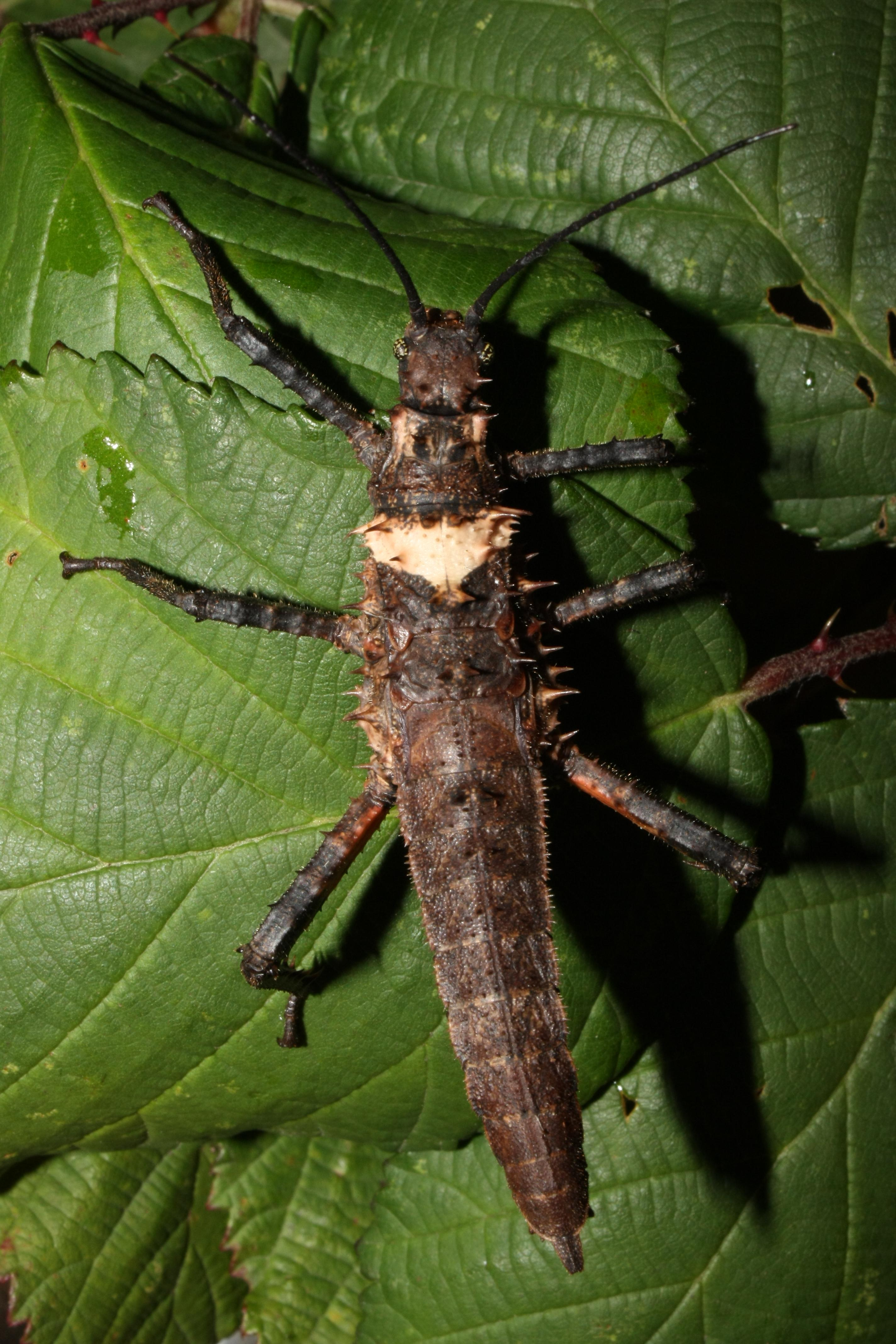
female nymph

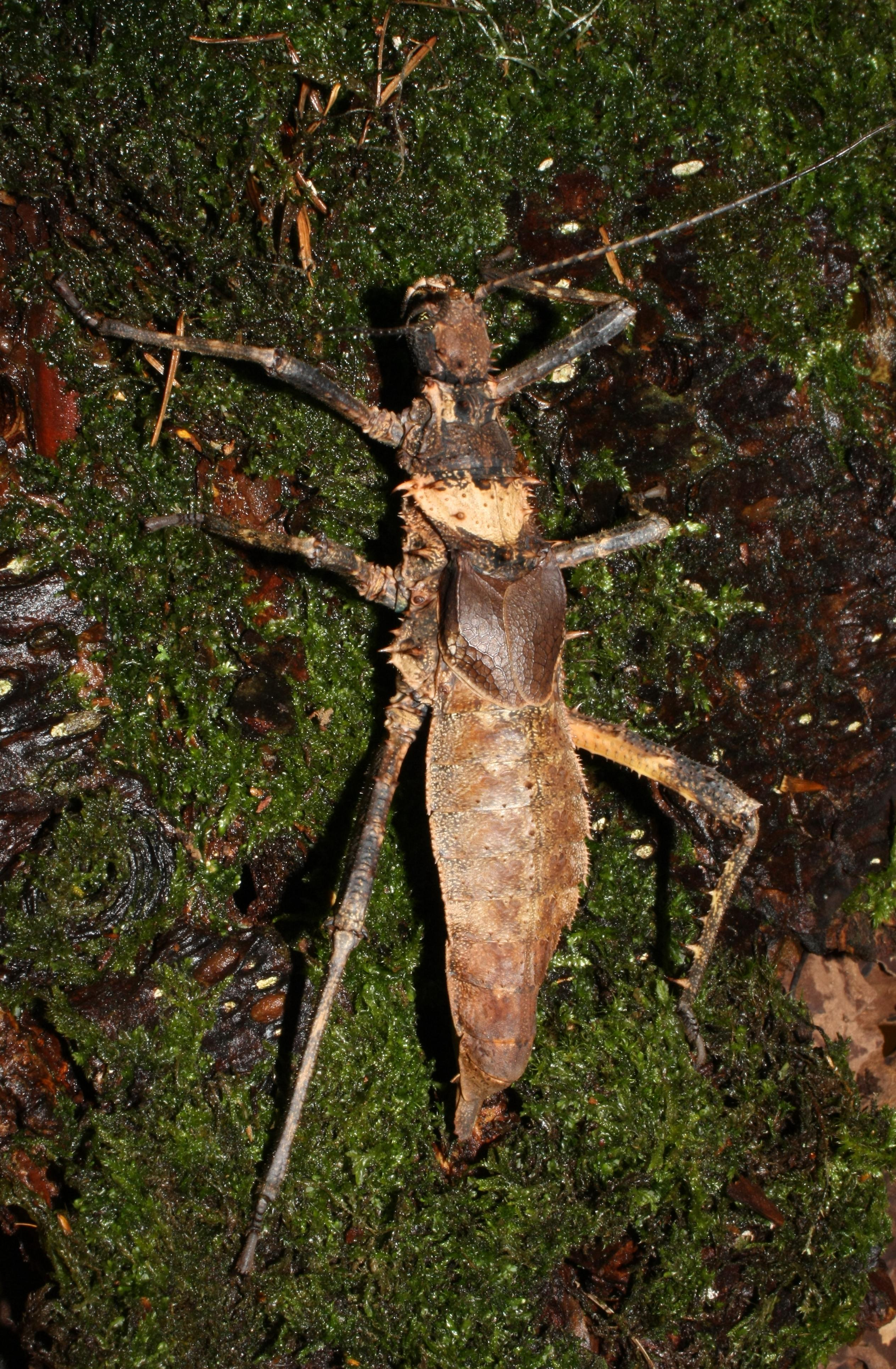
fresh adult female
