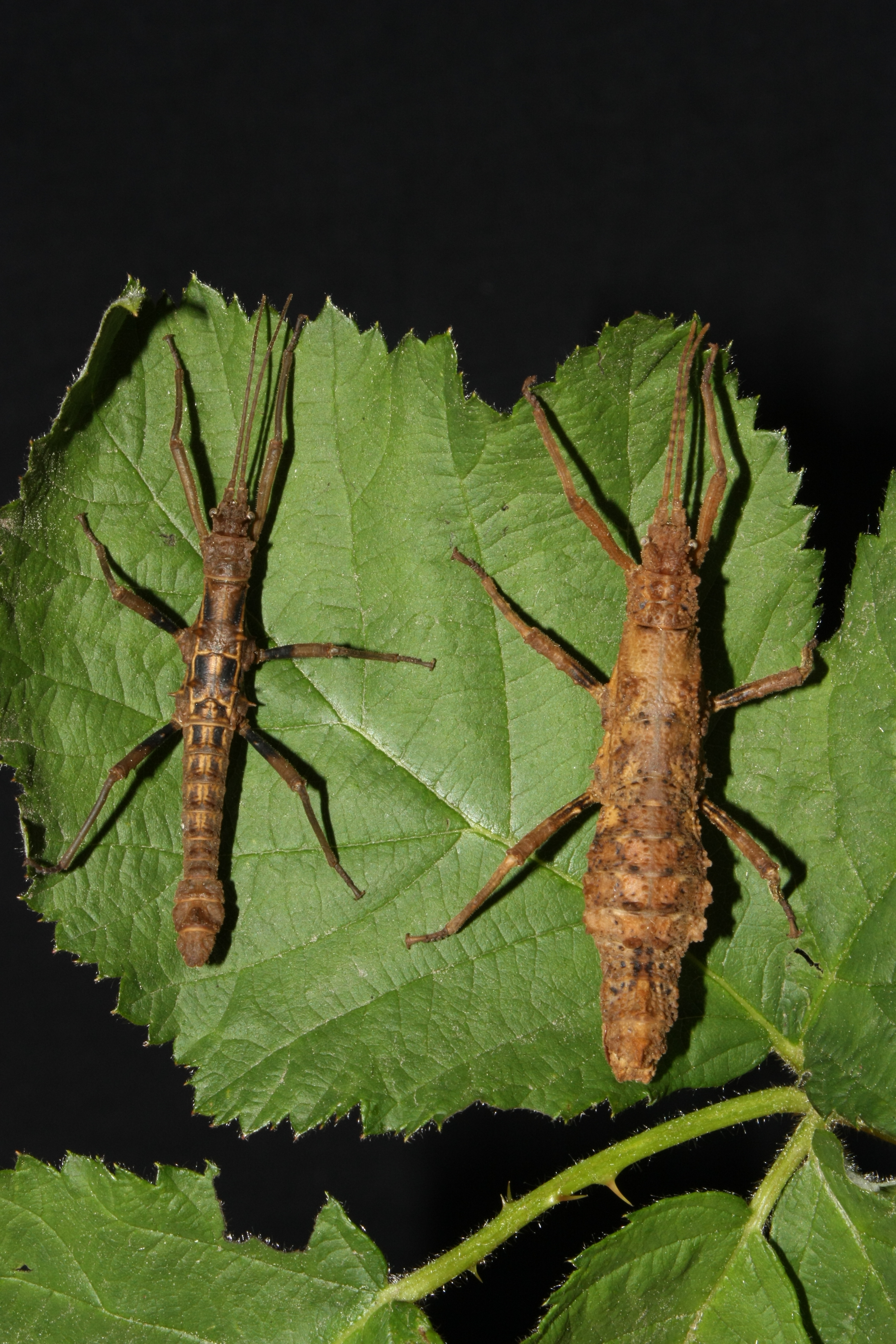
- Dares verrucosus, pair

Scientific classification
- Domain: Eukaryota
- Kingdom: Animalia
- Phylum: Arthropoda
- Class: Insecta
- Order: Phasmatodea
- Family: Heteropterygidae
- Subfamily: Dataminae
- Tribe: Datamini
- Genus: Dares
- Species: D. verrucosus

Binomial name
- Dares verrucosus Redtenbacher, 1906

Subspecies
- Dares verrucosus verrucosus; Dares verrucosus tawauensis

= Dares verrucosus =

Species of stick insect

Dares verrucosus is a species of stick insects. Like most other members of the genus Dares, the species is native to Borneo, more precisely in the north of the island.

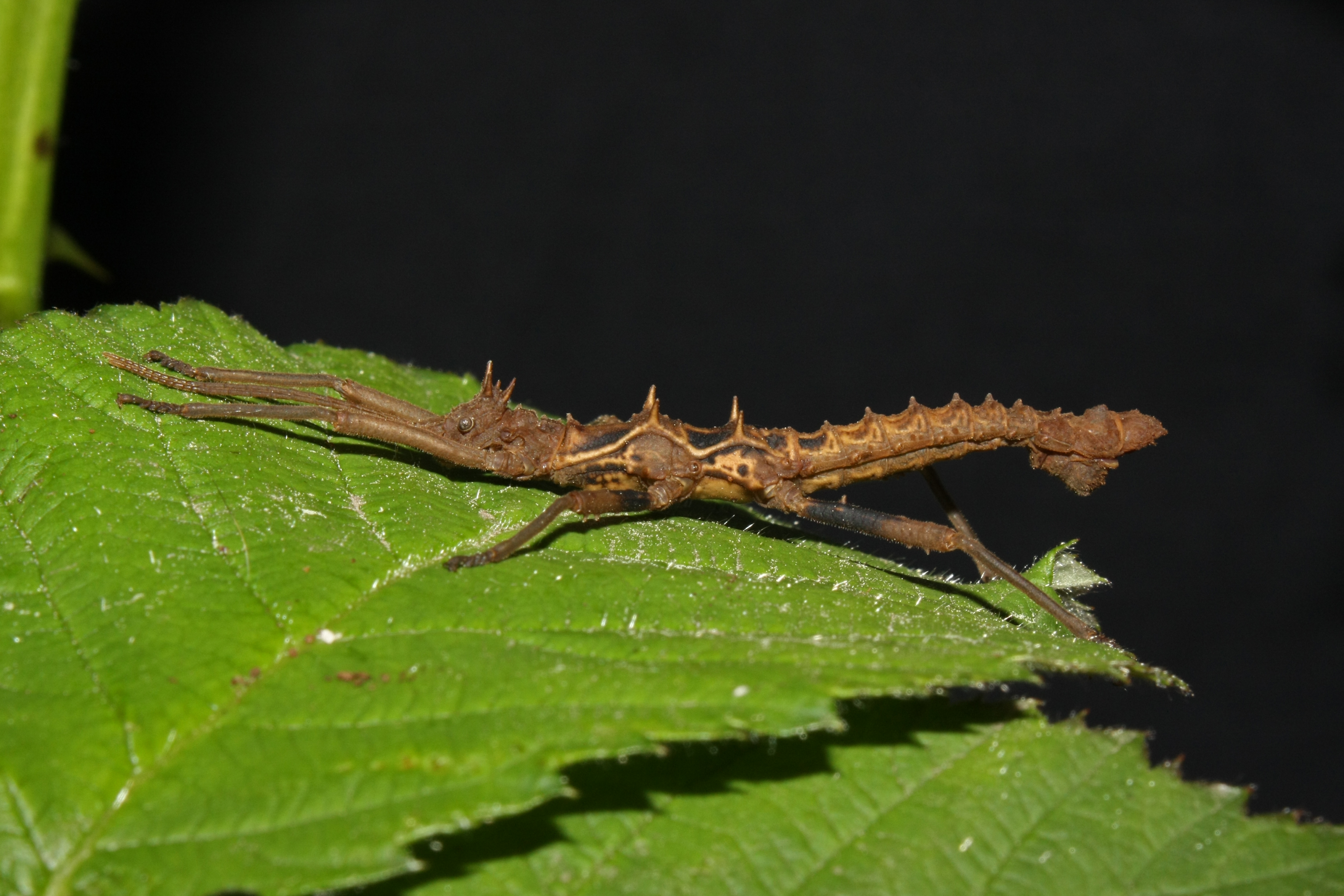
Male from the side

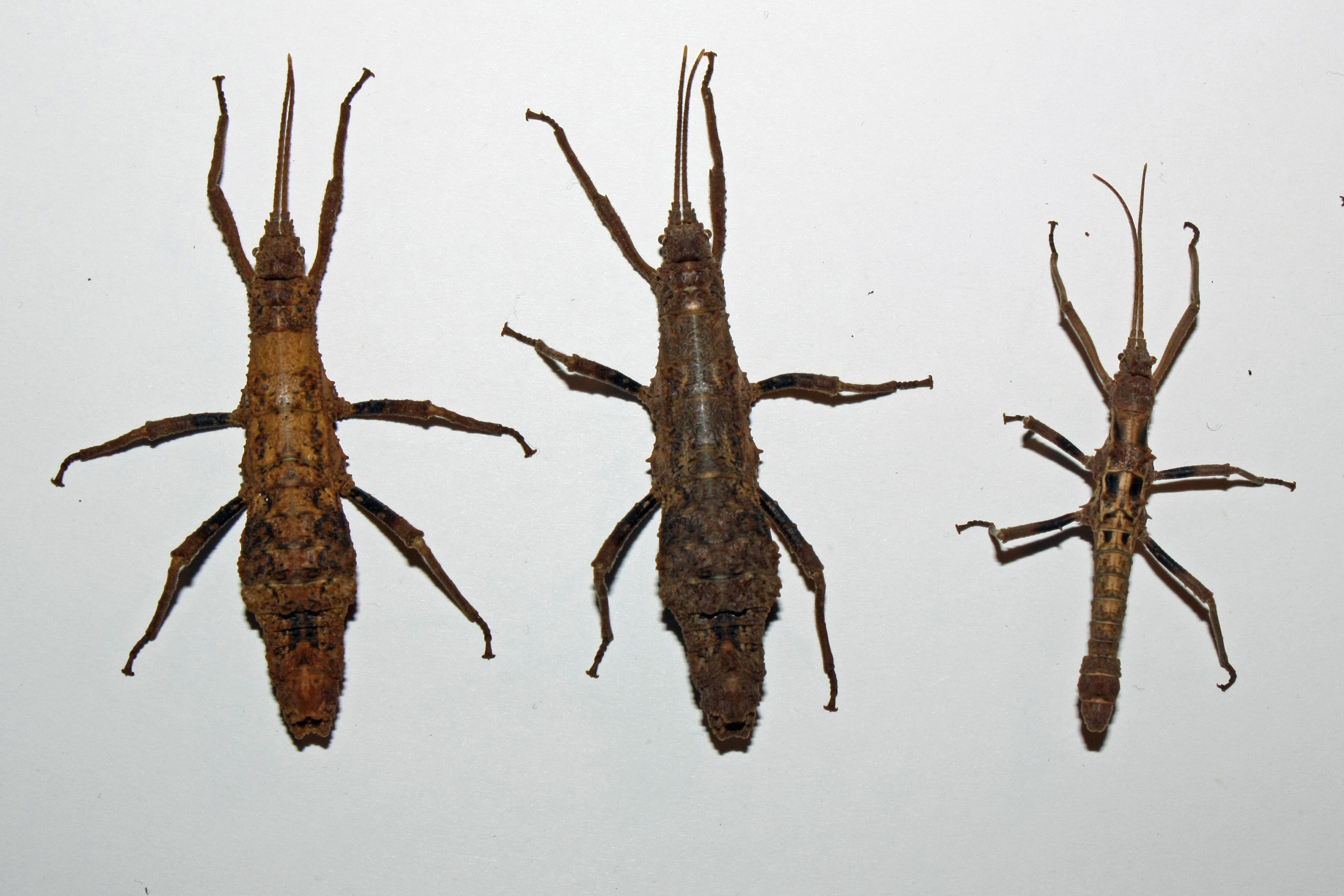
Two different colored females and one male

== Characteristics ==
Both sexes have the typical habitus for the genus. For the 41 to 46 millimetres (1.6 to 1.8 in) long females this means that they have no spines and that the body surface is occupied by many tubercles. The coloring is mostly dominated by a rather light brown, more rarely by a darker shade of brown. Lighter and darker, blurred spots complement the coloring. The underside is colored light brown to beige. The antennae consist of 25 segments. Their basal segment (scapus) is flat and has one or two teeth on the outside. The abdomen is widest in the middle and increases in height in adult, egg-laying females, which makes the animals look very plump, especially from the side. The males remain smaller than the females at 32 to 38 millimetres (1.3 to 1.5 in) in length. They are usually light brown, more rarely medium brown. On the upper side of the thorax, more precisely on the meso- and metanotum, there are usually two almost black longitudinal stripes interrupted by spines and segment boundaries to form spots, which also extend to the first segments of the abdomen are sufficient. They are flanked by particularly light, almost beige areas on the edge of the meso- and metanotum and in their center. In the case of darker specimens, the light area in the middle may be missing. Half of the middle and hind femura are colored black. The males have four spines on their heads. At the front edge of the mesonotum and in the rear area of the meso- and metanotum there are three further pairs of spines. To the side of the spines on the meso- and metanotum there is a further small spine on the pleura. All of the spines on the thorax are in their arrangement identical to those of Dares ulula, but remain much shorter than its ones. On the entire upper side of the abdomen, from the second segment onwards, there are paired, spine-like lobes. The antennae of the males consist of only 23 segments.

== Distribution area and way of life ==
Dares verrucosus is native to the Malay state of Sabah in the north of the island of Borneo. Most of the secured origins are in the east of Sabah.

The nocturnal way of life and the defense behavior corresponds to that of the other Dares species. In this species, too, the defense strategy consists of an almost perfect phytomimesis, which is possible due to its color and body shape. When touched, the animals drop to the ground. They stay there for a while and playing dead. The females lay one to three eggs a week on the ground. These are almost spherical, 3.5 to 3.8 millimetres (0.14 to 0.15 in) in size and speckled from dark gray to dark brown. There are 0.3 mm long, creamy white, curved hairs on the surface. The lid (operculum) has a diameter of 2.3 to 2.4 millimetres (0.091 to 0.094 in). The micropylar plate has three arms, one of which points towards the lid (operculum). The other two run circularly around the egg. After three to five months the nymphs hatch. Often in older nymphs there are a few light, almost white spots at the base of the abdomen, as is typical for many other Dares nymphs. It takes a good year for them to grow into imagos. Adult animals can live to be several years old. Kim D'Hulster reports of a female who lived five years after hatching.

== Taxonomy ==
The first scientific description of the species took place in 1906 by Josef Redtenbacher. The specific epithet verrucosus chosen by him means "warty". Klaus Günther introduced the species in 1935 as synonym to Dares ulula. Burghard Hausleithner identified the specimens he examined in 1991 as Dares validispinus, which Günther had also synonymous with Dares ulula. In 1998 Philip Edward Bragg validated Dares verrucosus again and found in the specimens examined by Hausleithner that only the females belong to Dares validispinus, while the males are representatives of Dares verrucosus. Bragg also describes a great similarity in particular of the females with the somewhat larger Dares breitensteini living in the more central part of Borneo and does not rule out that both belong to one species. Recent genetic studies do not confirm this, but place Dares verrucosus in the vicinity of Dares philippinensis and Dares murudensis. From the four females and one subadult male deposited as paralectotypes in the Natural History Museum, Vienna, Bragg selected the male as lectotype.

Francis Seow-Choen described with Dares verrucosus tawauensis a second subspecies which was found in Tawau. A difference to the nominate subspecies is in particular the lack of the paired, spine-like lobes on the upper side of the abdomen of the males. The female holotype and a male paratype are deposited at the Forestry Research Center in Sepilok. Another male paratype can be found at the Lee Kong Chian Natural History Museum at the National University of Singapore.

== Terraristic ==
Dares verrucosus is the second Dares species that was introduced into European terrariums. The then unidentified species was first imported in 1984 by Jonathan Cocking. The first specimens came from the Sepilok Rainforest Reserve west of Sandakan. Further imports from the same area followed.

The species is easy to keep and breed. A higher humidity is preferred, which can be achieved by a layer of soil covered with moist moss. The leaves of bramble and many other Rosaceae are eaten, as well as those of most of the Betulaceae and of Grossulariaceae.

From the Phasmid Study Group Dares verrucosus is listed under PSG number 69.

== Gallery ==
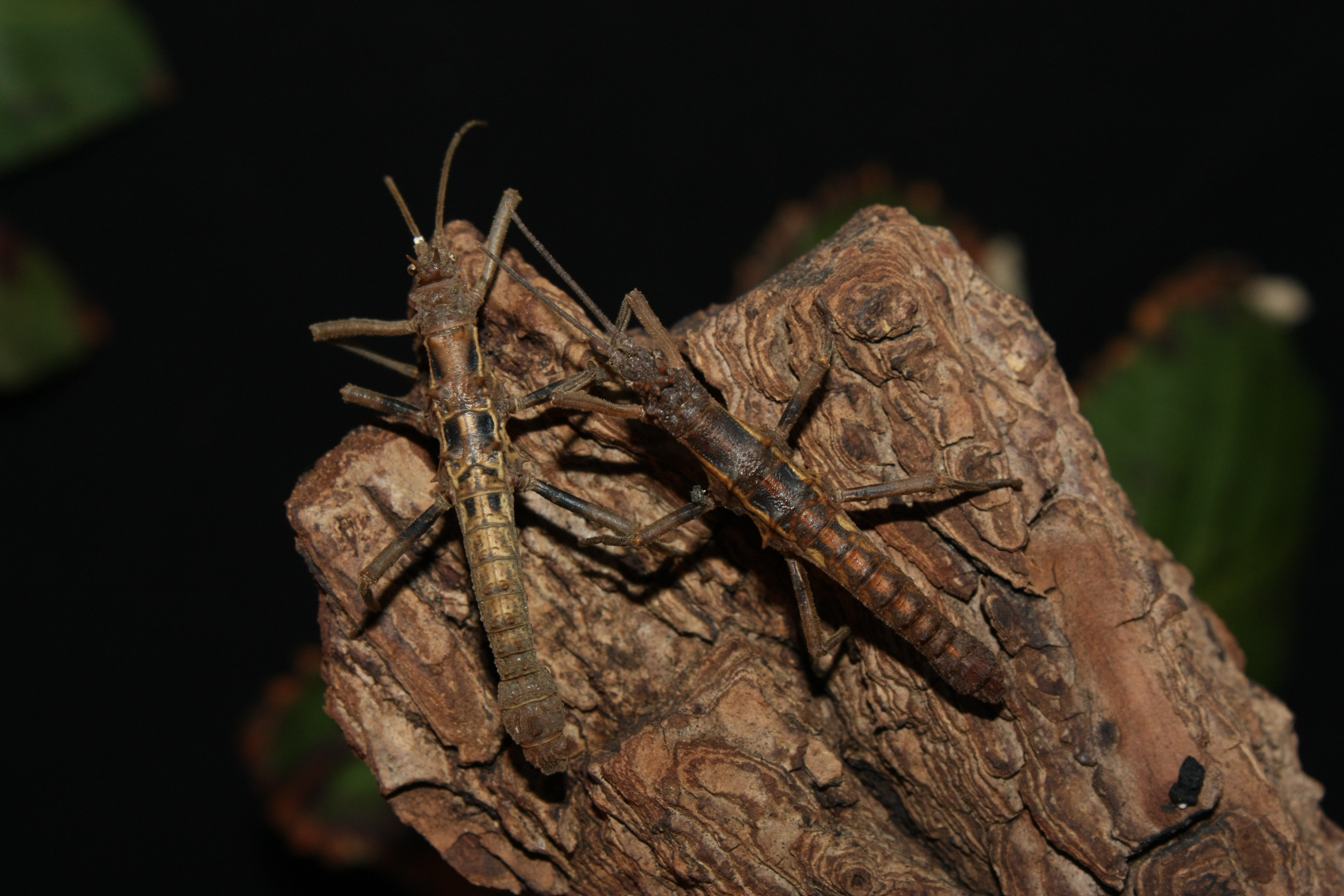
Two different colored males

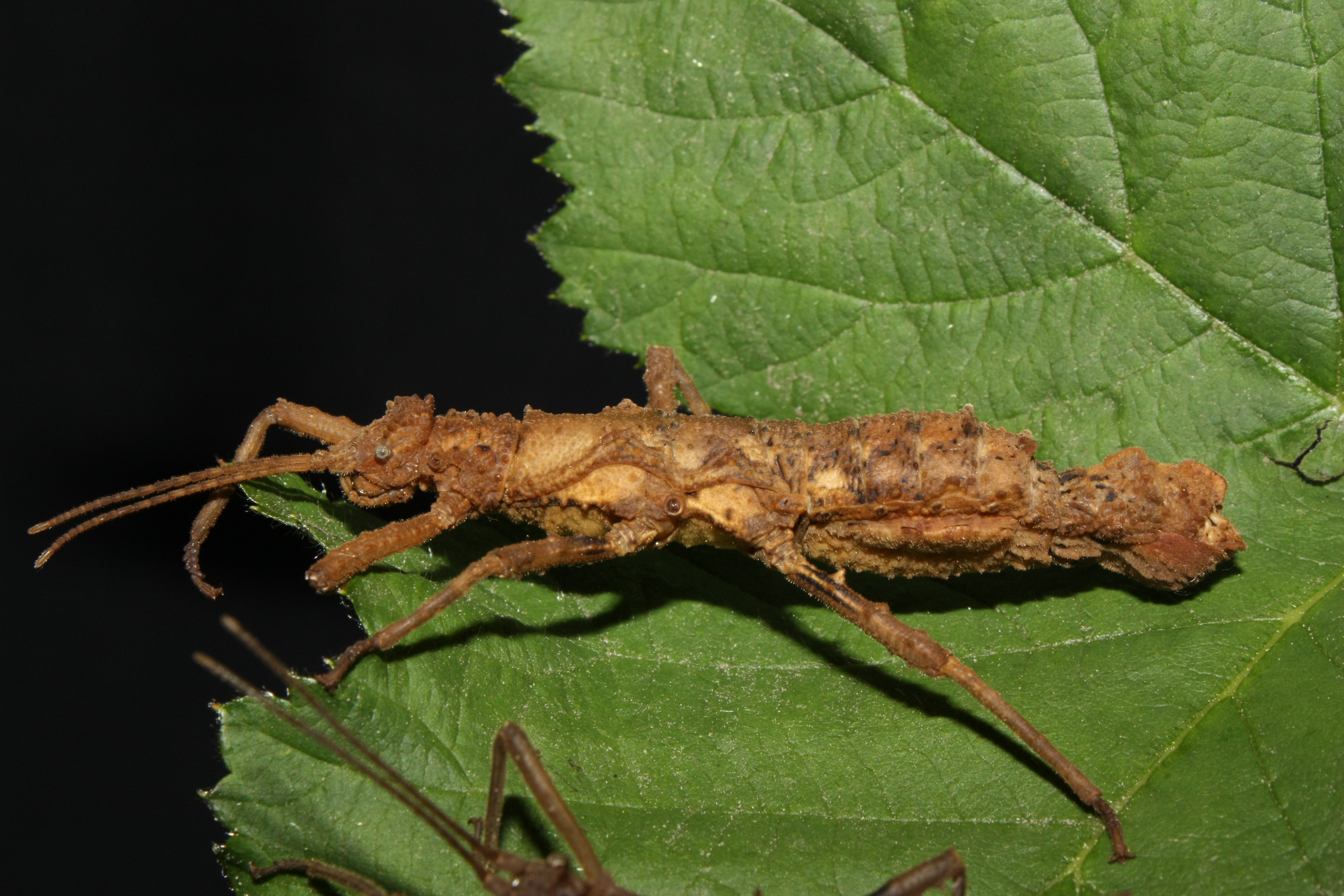
Female - laterally

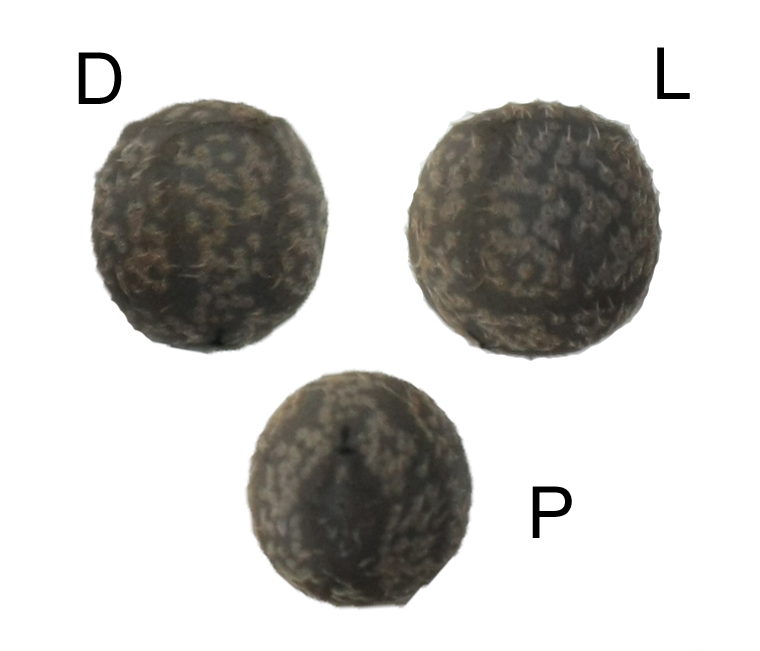
Eggs in dorsal (D), lateral (L) and view from pole (P)

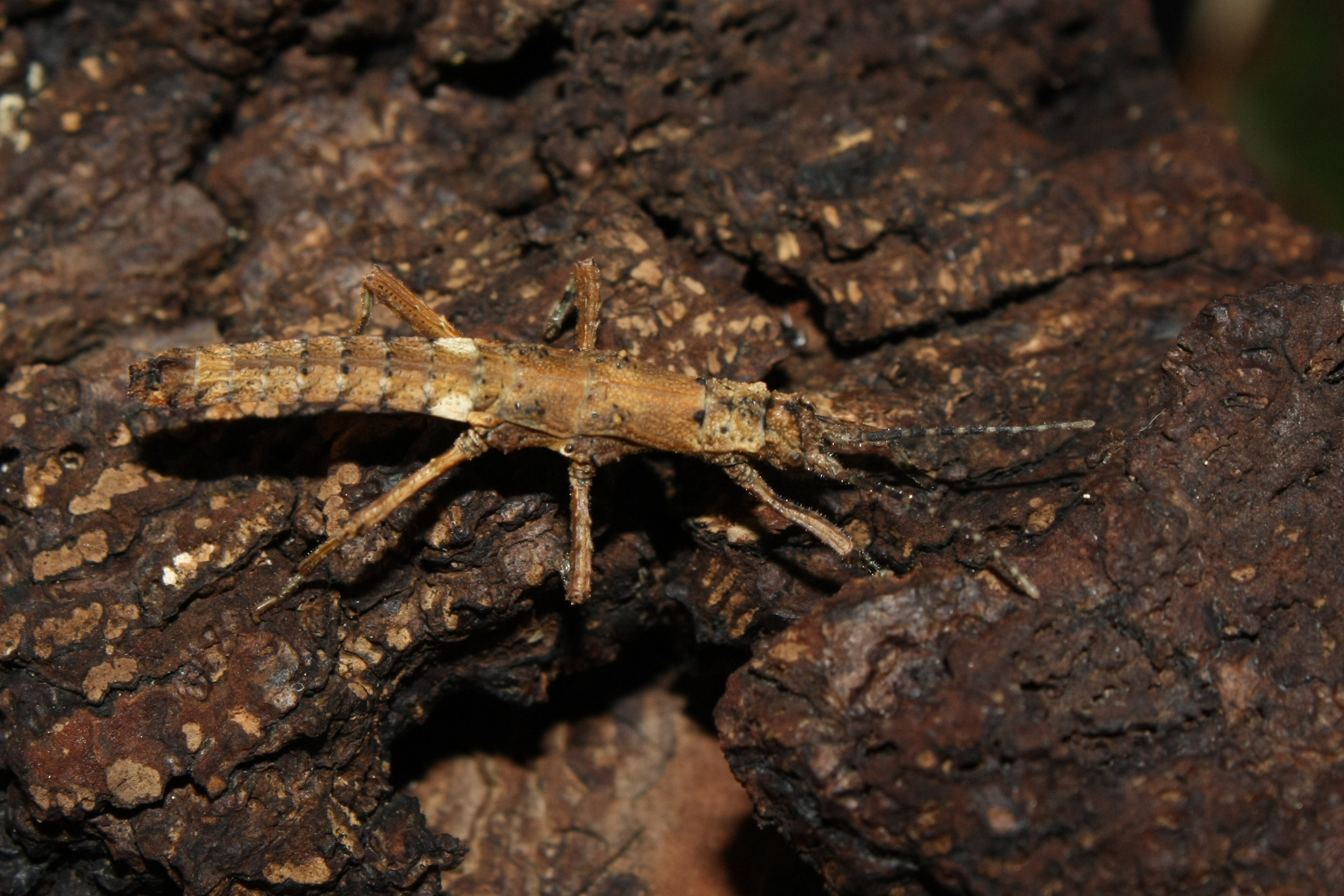
Vividly colored nymphs
