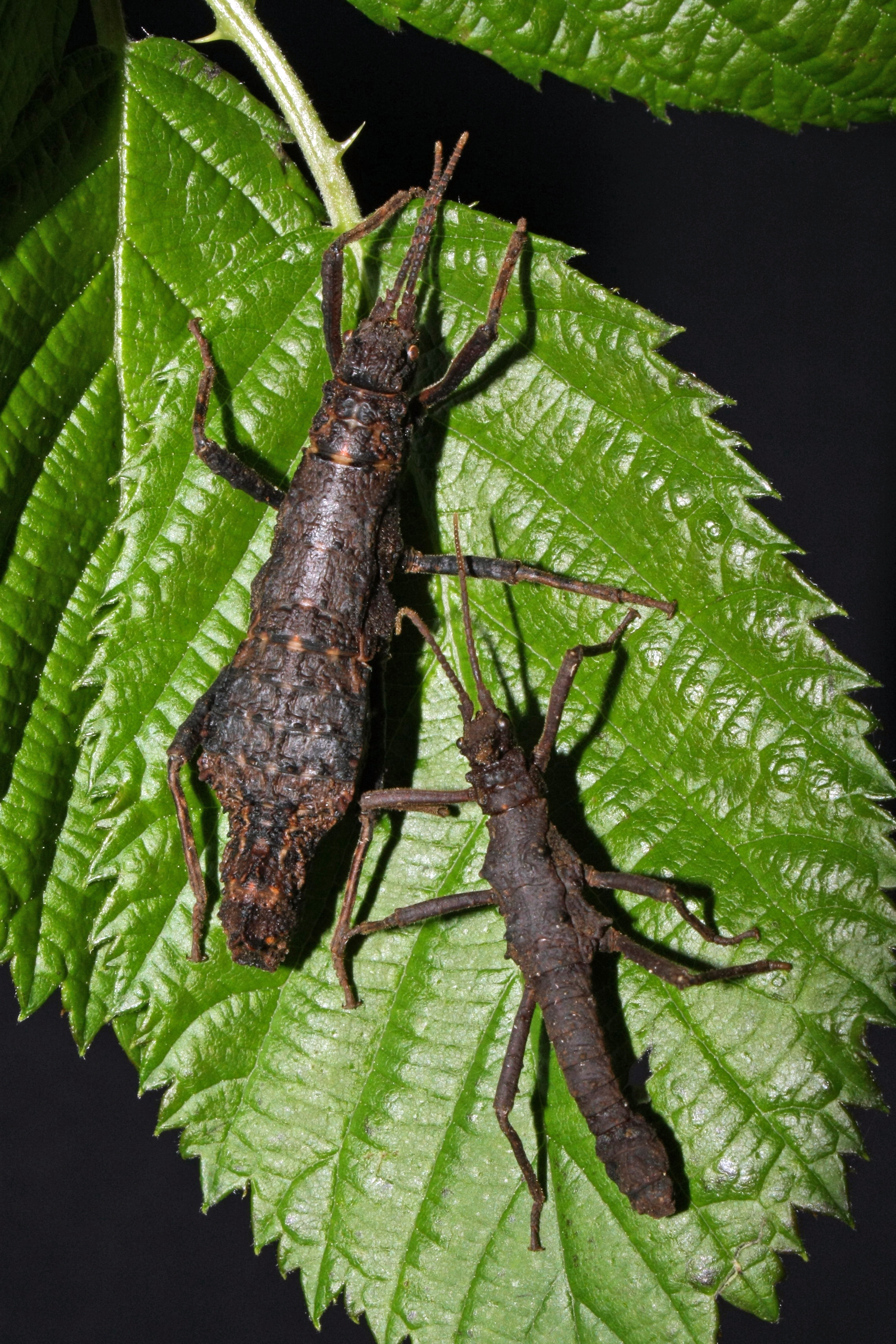
- Dares murudensis, pair

Scientific classification
- Kingdom: Animalia
- Phylum: Arthropoda
- Class: Insecta
- Order: Phasmatodea
- Family: Heteropterygidae
- Subfamily: Dataminae
- Tribe: Datamini
- Genus: Dares
- Species: D. murudensis

Binomial name
- Dares murudensis Bragg, 1998

= Dares murudensis =

Species of stick insect

Dares murudensis is a relatively small species of stick insect. Like most other members of the genus Dares, the species is native to Borneo.

== Characteristics ==
The species is the smallest of the genus Dares. The females are only 26 to 35 millimetres (1.0 to 1.4 in) long. The males remain even smaller with about 25 to 30 millimetres (0.98 to 1.18 in) length. Apart from the smaller size, Dares murdensis shows the genus-typical habitus.

The females have a raised, square area on the head on which there are differently pronounced front, central and rear occipital tubercle. The lateral occipital tubercles can also be found. The number of antennae segments of females varies between 22 (in the holotype) and 23 (in all other animals examined so far), where the basal segment (scapus) and the second segment (pedicellus) each have a tooth on the outer edge. The pronotum, which widens slightly towards the rear, has a transverse groove which is more distinctive than that of Dares multispinosus. On the surface are the anterior and posterior medial tubercles of the pronotum and smaller pre- and post-median tubercles. They are less pronounced than in Dares ulula, but more clearly than in Dares mjobergi. The mesonotum shows two large anterior marginal tubercles and two central posterior hillocks. The mesopleura have tubercles and the mesosternum two rounded tubercles. The metanotum shows an indistinct longitudinal edge, a small rear hill with an indistinct tubercle at the top. The rough metapleures have large tubercles over the coxae. Two indistinct rounded tubercles can be seen on the metasternum. On the rough abdomen there is a longitudinal ridge (carina) that is indistinct in the first two segments and more distinct in segments three to six. The lateral edges of segments four and five are enlarged by indistinct tubercles. There are no tubercles on the edges of the second and third segments. The posterior tubercles of segments three to six are very small and paired. The middle longitudinal ridge is forked at the rear on the eighth segment. Likewise on the ninth segment, where it is tall and narrow. Segment ten contains a pair of tubercles near the anterior margin and short lateral ridges near the posterior margin. Its tip is straight and has no indentations. The femora of all legs are covered with tubercles at the edges. The meso- and metafemora have a pair of small spines or pointed tubercles at the tips of the ventral edges. All tibiae are free of tubercles.

The body surface of the males is dull and colored red to black-brown. Clearly developed spines on the thorax, as they are present in other representatives of the genus, are absent. In the rear area of the upper side of the meso- and metanotum there is only one pair of elevations each, which culminate less in a point than in a larger tubercle. Similar structures are found in the rear area of the metapleura above the rear coxae. In contrast to Dares philippinensis they are missing on the mesopleura. On the back of the head, the two pairs of the anterior and posterior coronals form a crown of four short spines, similar to those found in other species.

== Distribution area ==
Dares murudensis is known from various localities in northern Borneo. The female on which the first description is based was found on Mount Murud, the highest mountain in Sarawak, at an altitude of 2,134 to 2,195 metres (7,001 to 7,201 ft). Only about 20 kilometers south is with Bario, a village community in the Kelabit Highlands is another origin. Here the species was detected at an altitude about 900 metres (3,000 ft). The third origin is the Crocker Range Mountains, which separate the east from the west coast of Sabah. The species was found there in 2006 near Keningau and later also near Tambunan. Based on the findings so far, there are indications that the animals living in higher altitudes remain smaller than those from lower ones.

== Way of life ==
As food plants are Rosaceae such as (Rubus moluccanus), Myrtaceae such as Eugenia species and Psidium guajava known. In its nocturnal way of life and the phytomimesis used for camouflage during the day, it is similar to the other Dares species. The eggs are about 3.2 millimetres (0.13 in) long, but only a good 2 millimetres (0.079 in) wide and, due to the large lid (operculum), not quite spherical. They are dark brown in color and marked with light brown spots around the few bristles. One of the three arms of the micropylar plate reaches the edge of the lid, the other two run circularly around the egg. The nymphs, which hatch from the eggs after about 4 months, are then about 10 millimetres (0.39 in) long. It takes about 10 to 12 months until they are adult.

== Discovery and taxonomy ==
Philip Edward Bragg described Dares murudensis in 1998 on the basis of an adult female, which Eric Georg Mjöberg was collected at the eponymous Mount Murud. This holotype, from which Bragg was able to remove an egg from the abdomen, is deposited in the Naturalis Biodiversity Center in Leiden. When this female was collected is not known. Bragg himself and Paul Jenning collected live specimens of this species on December 25, 2006, near Keningau in the Crocker Range National Park in Sabah, about 170 kilometers north of Mount Murud. Without realizing that the species had already been described, it was successfully bred as Dares sp. 'Crocker Range'. Their affiliation to Dares murdensis was first recognized by Thies H. Büscher in 2014.

== Terraristic ==
Dares murudensis has been the fourth and smallest species of the genus since 2007 in European terrariums. The breeding stock goes back to the specimens found by Bragg and Jenning in 2006 and until it was identified by Büscher in 2014 named as Dares sp. 'Crocker Range'. The species is easy to keep and breed. With higher humidity the animals are almost black, with drier housing conditions the females are more brown and the males are more reddish-brown. The laid eggs can remain on the floor for incubation in the terrarium if a slightly damp substrate is used. Leaves of bramble and other Rosaceae as well as hazel are eaten. The species has been listed under PSG number 332 by the Phasmid Study Group since 2013.

== Gallery ==
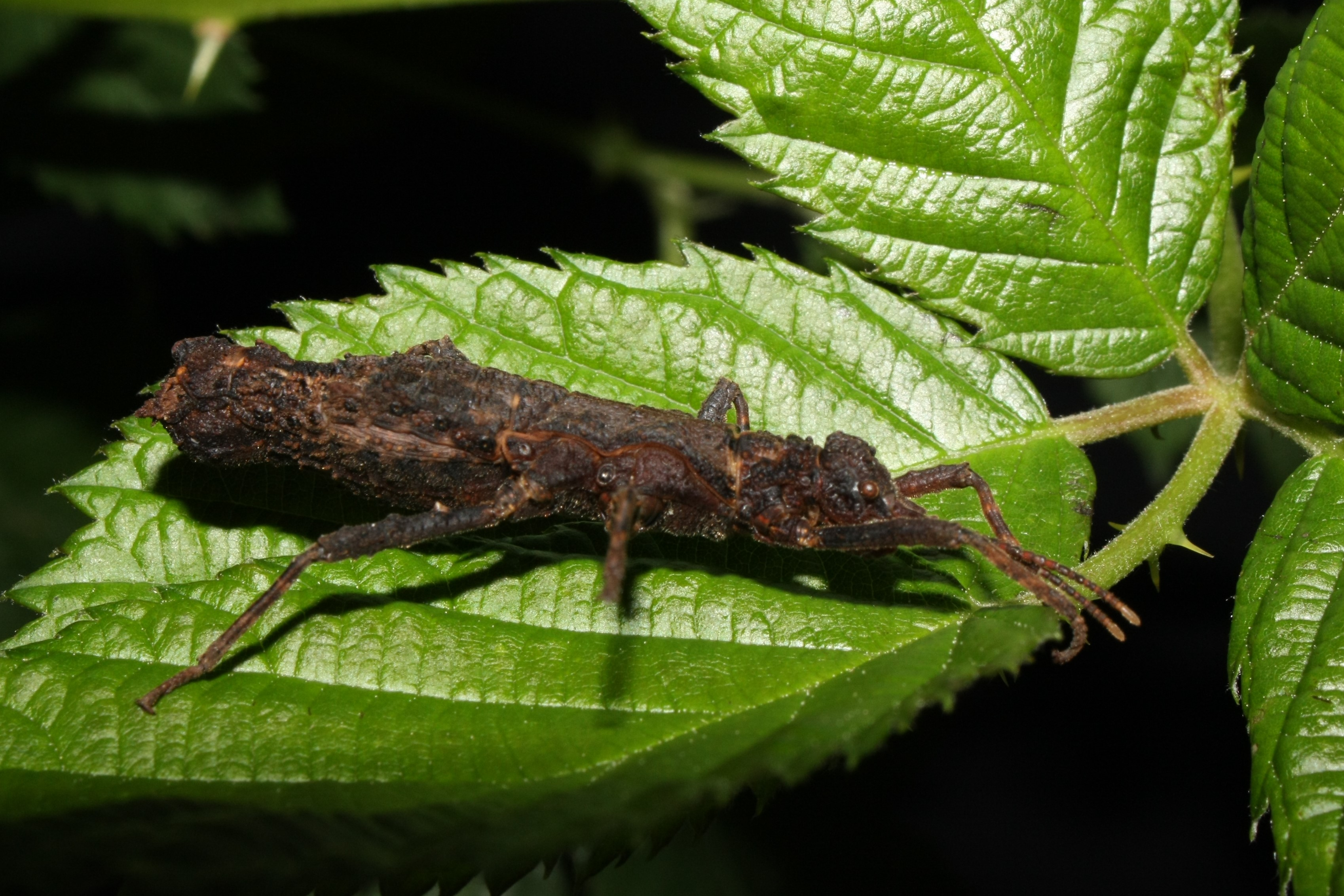
Dares murudensis, female

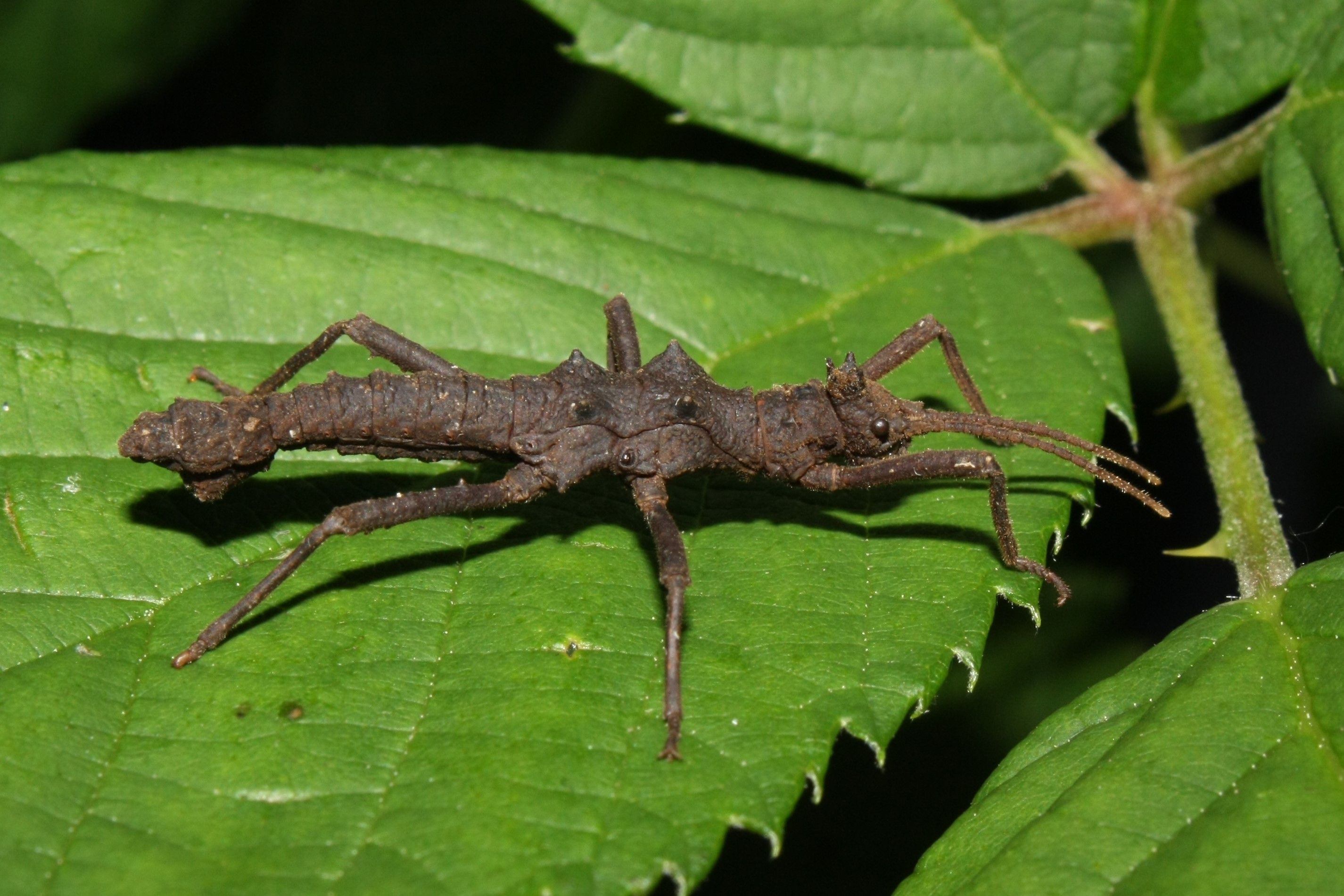
Dares murudensis, male

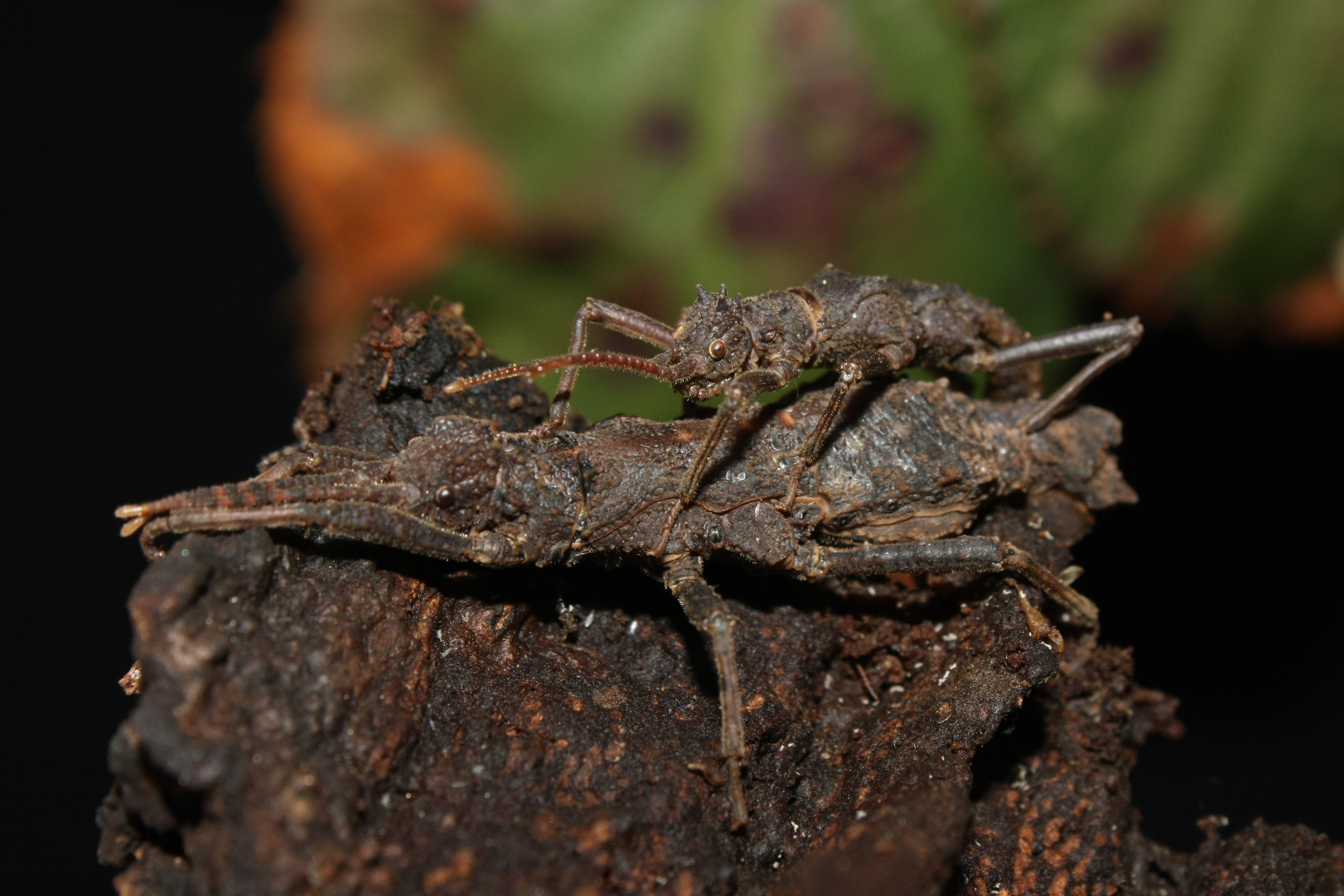
Dares murudensis, pair

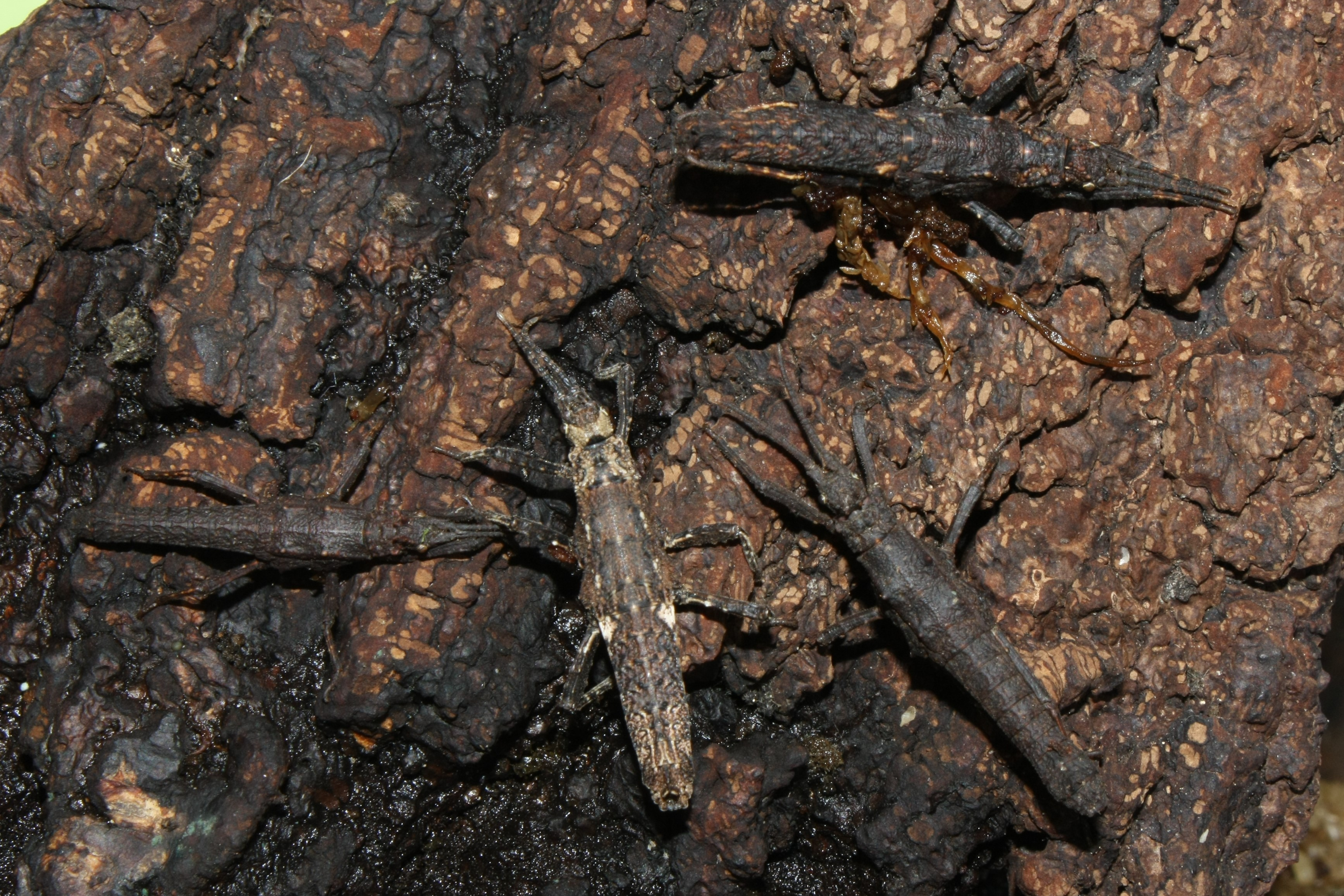
Dares murudensis, nymphs
