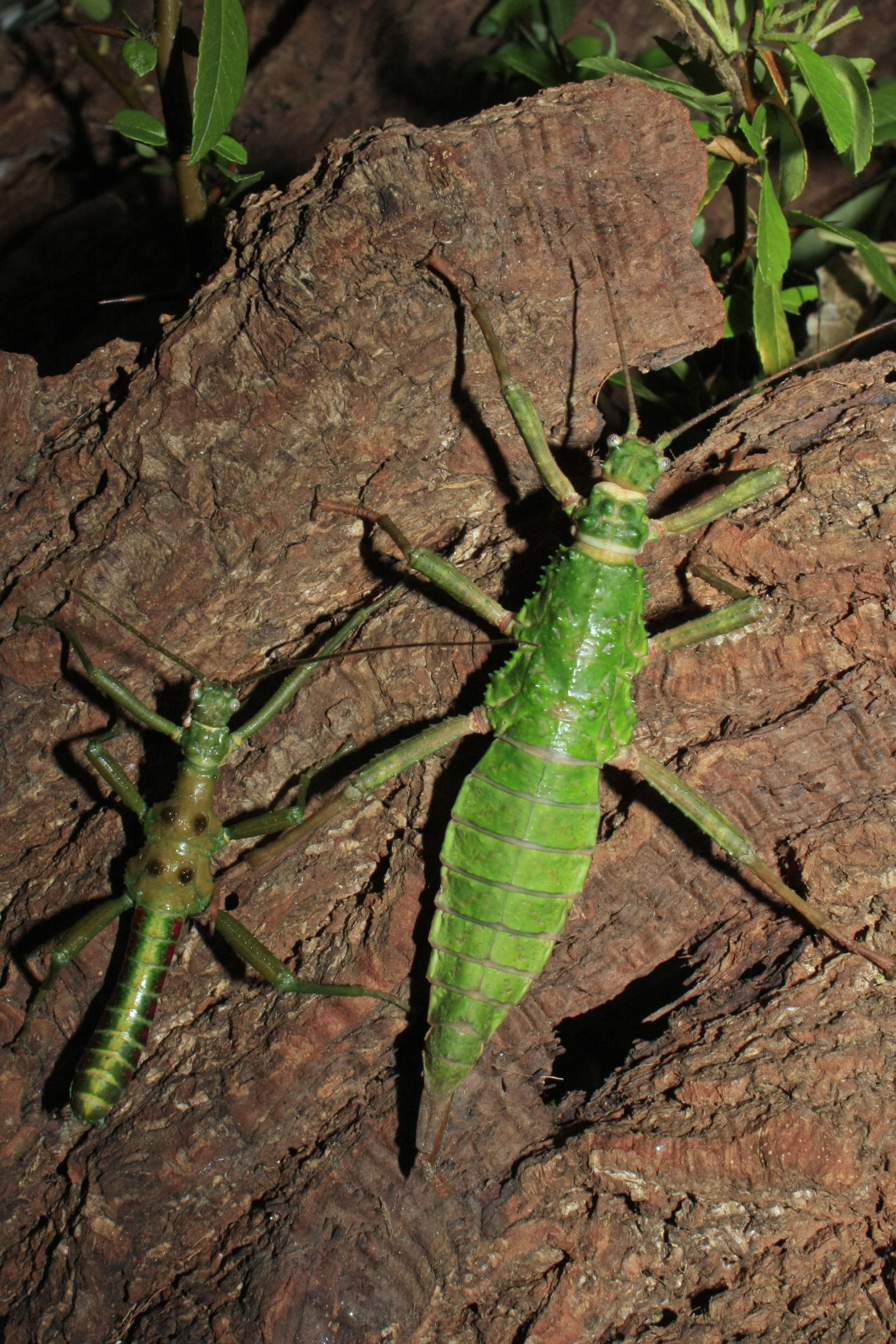
- Mearnsiana bullosa, left male, right female

Scientific classification
- Kingdom: Animalia
- Phylum: Arthropoda
- Clade: Pancrustacea
- Class: Insecta
- Order: Phasmatodea
- Family: Heteropterygidae
- Subfamily: Obriminae
- Tribe: Obrimini
- Genus: Mearnsiana
- Species: M. bullosa

Binomial name
- Mearnsiana bullosa Rehn, J. A. G. & Rehn, J.W.H., 1939

Synonyms
- Hennobrimus hennemanni Conle, 2006; Trachyaretaon manobo Lit & Eusebio, 2005

= Mearnsiana bullosa =

Species of stick insect

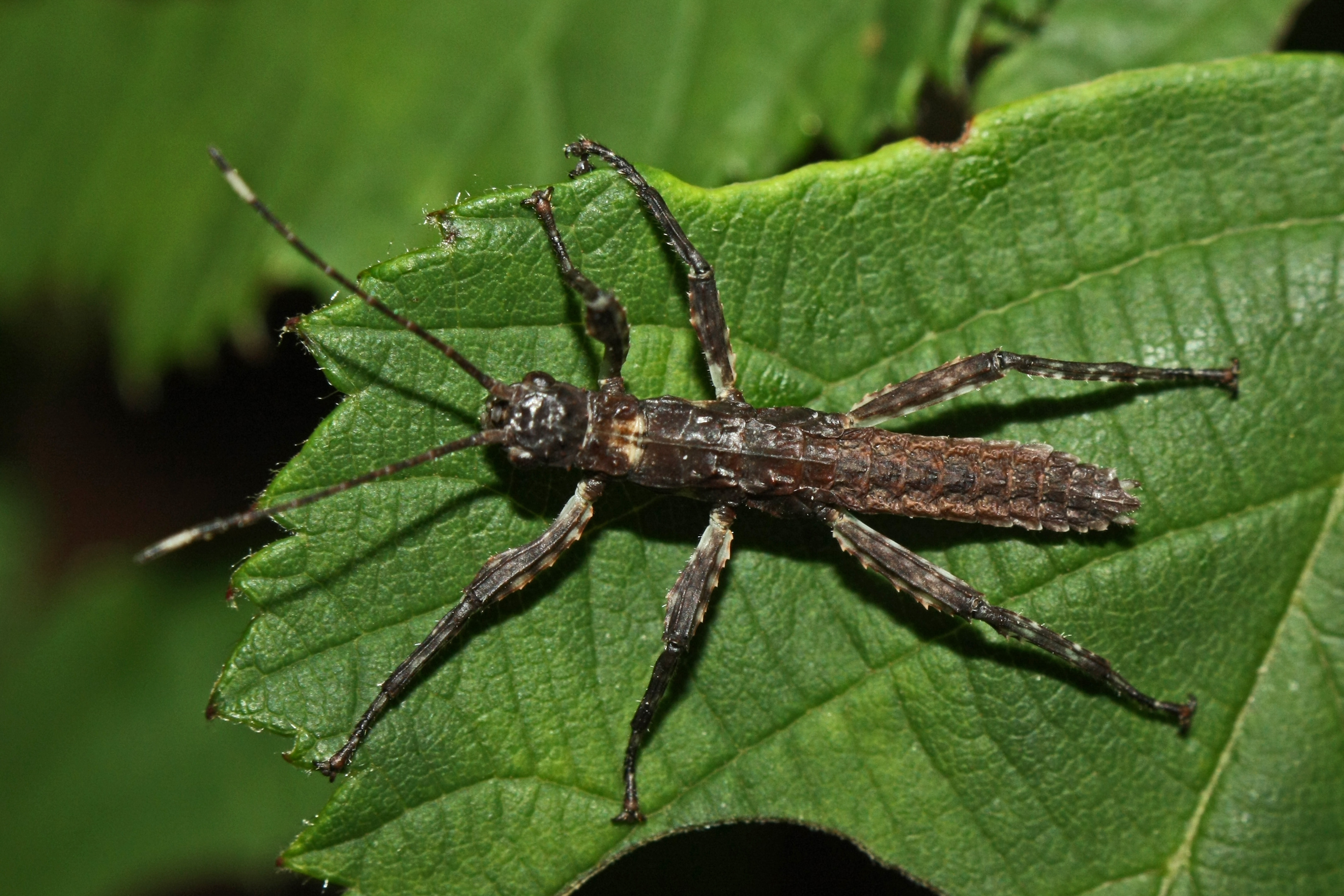
Even hatched nymph

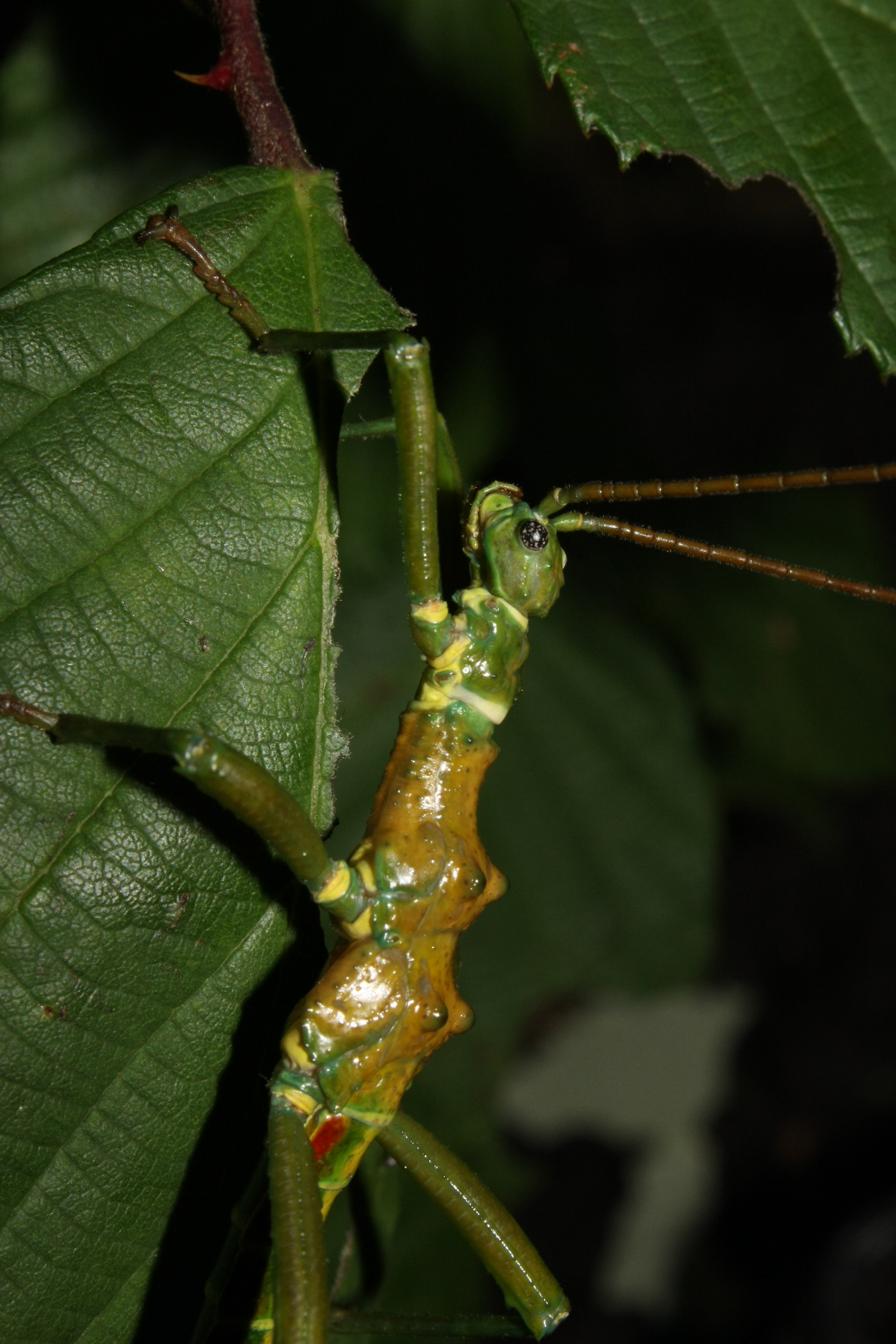
Portrait of a male

Mearnsiana bullosa, occasionally referred to by the common name Manobos stick-insect,is a species of stick insect in the family Heteropterygidae. It is native to the Philippine islands of Mindanao and Leyte. Until 2023 it was the only described representative of the genus Mearnsiana.

== Description ==
The species, wingless and thornless in both sexes, is the most colorful of the known representatives of the family Heteropterygidae. The body surface is shiny. The 4.5 to 5.1 centimetres (1.8 to 2.0 in) long males have an olive green basic color. The joint membranes and partly also the margins of the individual segments are colored bright yellow. meso- and metathorax are colored orange-brown above and below and have two pairs of slightly darker humps on the upper side. The coloring of the upper side of the abdomen is striking. A wide yellow vertical stripe runs along its entire length, flanked by two green stripes and two red stripes towards the edge. With more than 5 centimetres (2.0 in) the antennae are good body length. At 8 to 9.8 centimetres (3.1 to 3.9 in), the females are significantly longer than the males. Their antennae are with about 5 centimetres (2.0 in) in length shorter than the body. This is colored bright green or a bit more plain green-brown on the top. Legs, antennae and ovipositor are always light brown. The color of the underside varies from orange brown to slightly purple. The abdomen can swell significantly during egg production. The abdomen ends in a long, straight secondary ovipositor, which surrounds the actual ovipositor.

== Distribution ==
For a long time, Mearnsiana bullosa was only known from the Philippine province Province of Cotabato on the island of Mindanao, where it was found in the area around the volcano Mount Apo. There is now also evidence from the provinces of South Cotabato, Davao del Sur, Surigao del Sur and Agusan del Sur on Mindanao and from Mount Balocaue on the island of Leyte, located north of Mindanao.

== Behaviour and ecology ==
The species is nocturnal like the other members of the family, but adult specimens do not hide during the day, but hang freely in the food plant. When touched, they drop to the ground and then usually start running immediately. Plants from the genus Leptospermum and Casuarina on which the animals were found belong to the natural food spectrum. The bulbous-shaped eggs are laid in the ground as a clutch of 20 to 30 eggs at intervals of 2 to 3 weeks. They are gray in color, 5.1 millimetres (0.20 in) long, about 3.7 millimetres (0.15 in) wide and have a black lid (operculum). The micropylar plate has four arms and its shape resembles a horizontally flattened "X". The two upper arms can also flow together to form a single, wider arm. After about 3 to 5 months the nymphs hatch. Their bodies and legs are very flat and almost black except for a light spot between pro- and mesonotum. At first they walk around very briskly with their abdomen rolled forward. The white margins of the abdomen on the underside are shown. This behavior only changes with the start of food intake and the nymphs, which are now gradually getting lighter, nestle flat against twigs or branches of the food plants, making them barely detectable. Older stages develop a light brown and pale green camouflage pattern, which is complemented by a kind of white lichen pattern. They keep their flat shape until the last moult and have a dull and relatively blistered body surface. Males are adult after around 5 to 6 months. Females need about one month longer.

== Taxonomy ==
In 1939 James Abram Garfield Rehn and his son John William Holman Rehn described the species using a male nymph as Mearnsiana bullosa. It was found at the Mount Apo in Mindanao and is deposited as holotype in the National Museum of Natural History in Washington, D.C. The name Mearnsiana is dedicated to the American ornithologist and natural scientist Edgar Alexander Mearns, who found the holotype at the Mount Apo. The specific epithet bullosa means "blistered" and probably refers to the vesicular tubercles coated body surface, especially of the nymphs.

In 2005 Ireneo L. Lit, Jr. and Orlando L. Eusebio described a species called Trachyaretaon manobo, which was also found at the Mt. Apo. Their type material is deposited at the University of the Philippines. In the following year Oskar V. Conle also described a remarkably colorful species from Mindanao. He named it Hennobrimus hennemanni in honor of his friend, Frank H. Hennemann, who was also researching phasmids. The type material of this kind is deposited in the Bavarian State Collection of Zoology. A short time later, Conle assumed that this species was the rediscovered Mearnsiana bullosa. The multiple description results from the big difference between the nymph described by Rehn and Rehn and the until 2005 unknown imago. Both Trachyaretaon manobo and Hennobrimus hennemanni were in 2016 by Hennemann et al synonymized with Mearnsiana bullosa.

== In terraristics ==
Dave Navarro collected animals of this species at Mt. Apo in April 2008. From the eggs he had sent to Europe, the Swiss phasmid breeder Bruno Kneubühler established the first breeding stock of the species. A second stock goes back to animals also collected in 2008 by Joachim Bresseel, Mark Bushell and Ellen Caluwe. From the Phasmid Study Group Mearnsiana bullosa has been listed under PSG number 338 since the middle of 2013.

Mearnsiana bullosa is easy to keep and breed. A higher humidity is preferred. A suitable substrate must be offered for laying eggs (soil on the terrarium floor). Leaves of bramble and many other Rosaceae are eaten in captivity, as well as those of Hypericum, hazel, oak and salal.

== Gallery ==
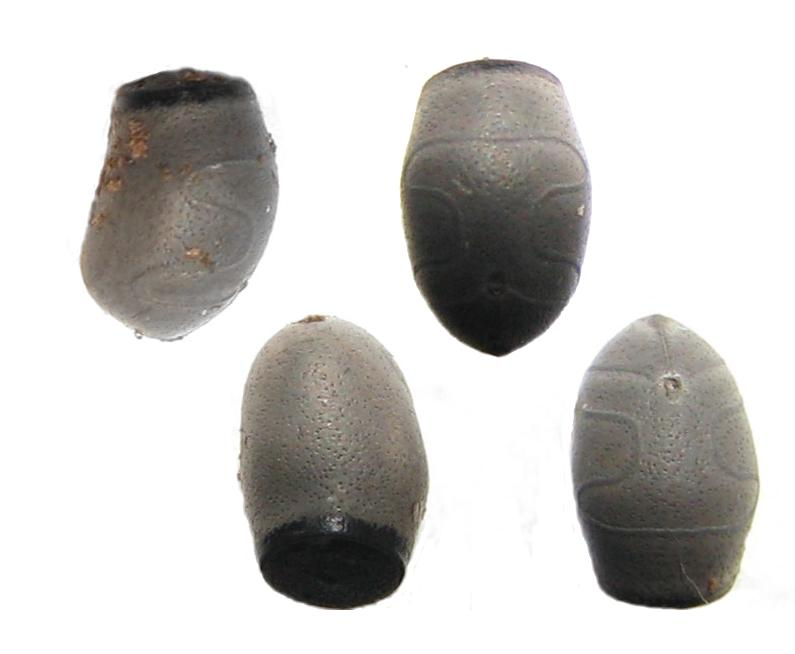
Eggs

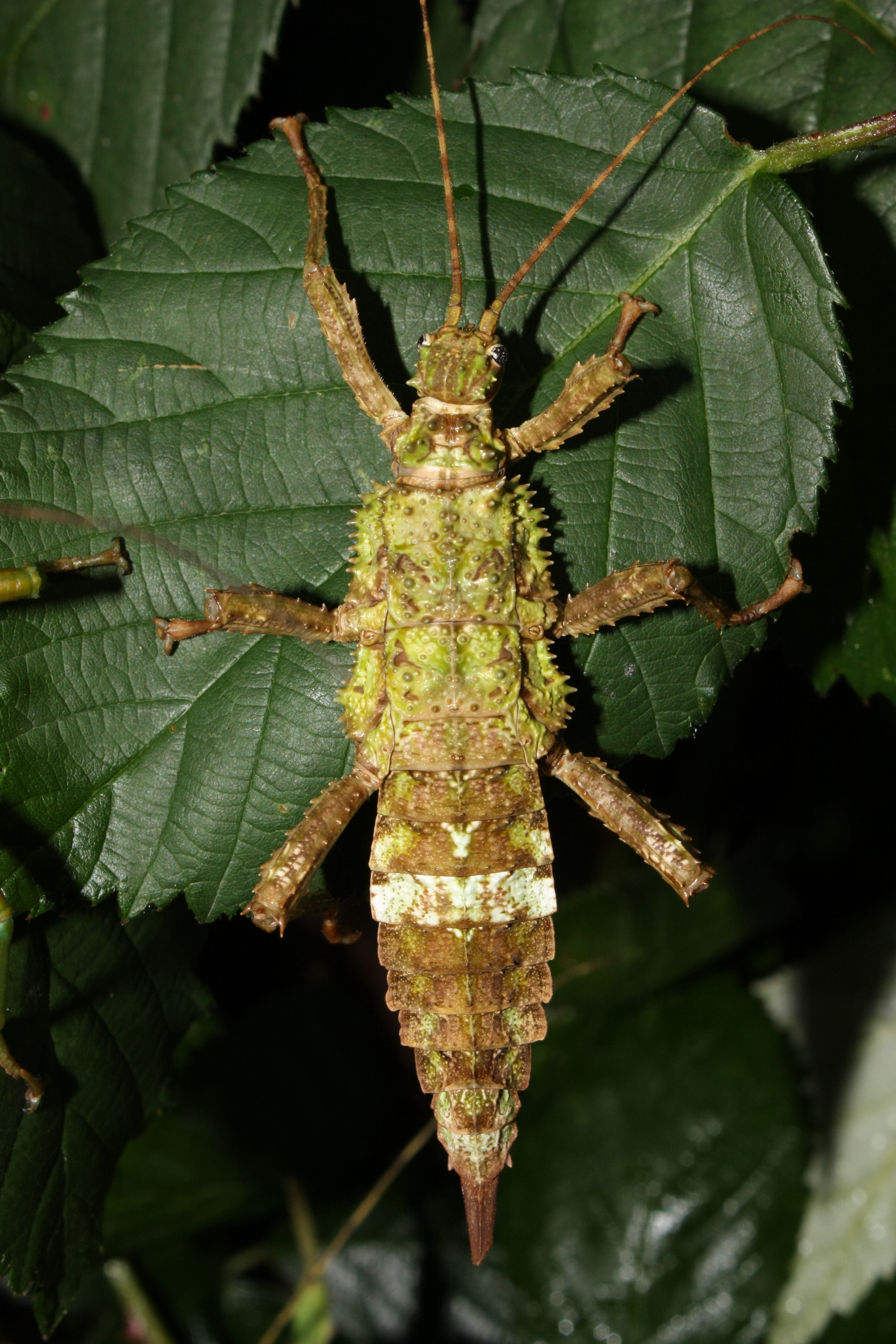
Subadult female

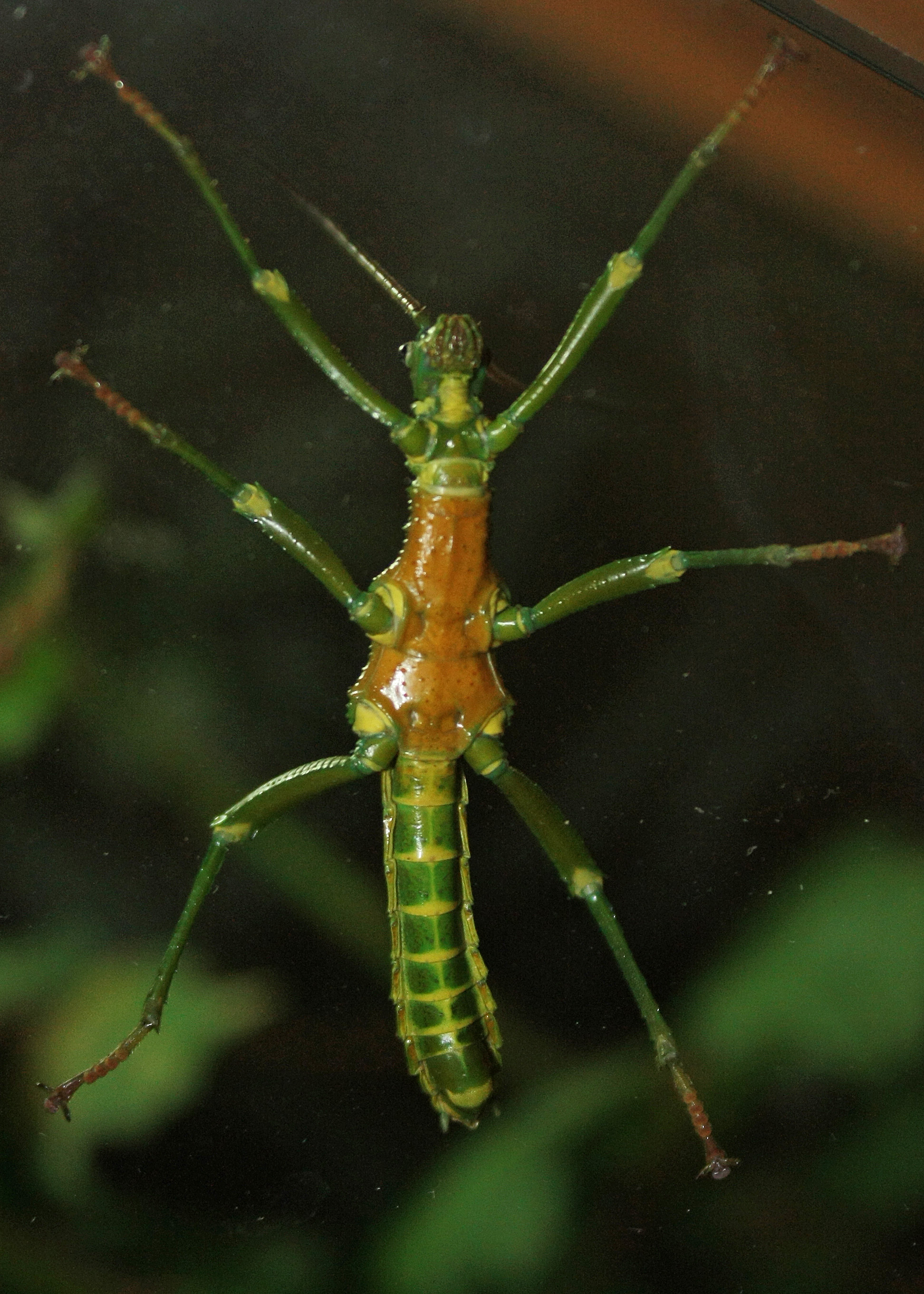
Ventral view of a male

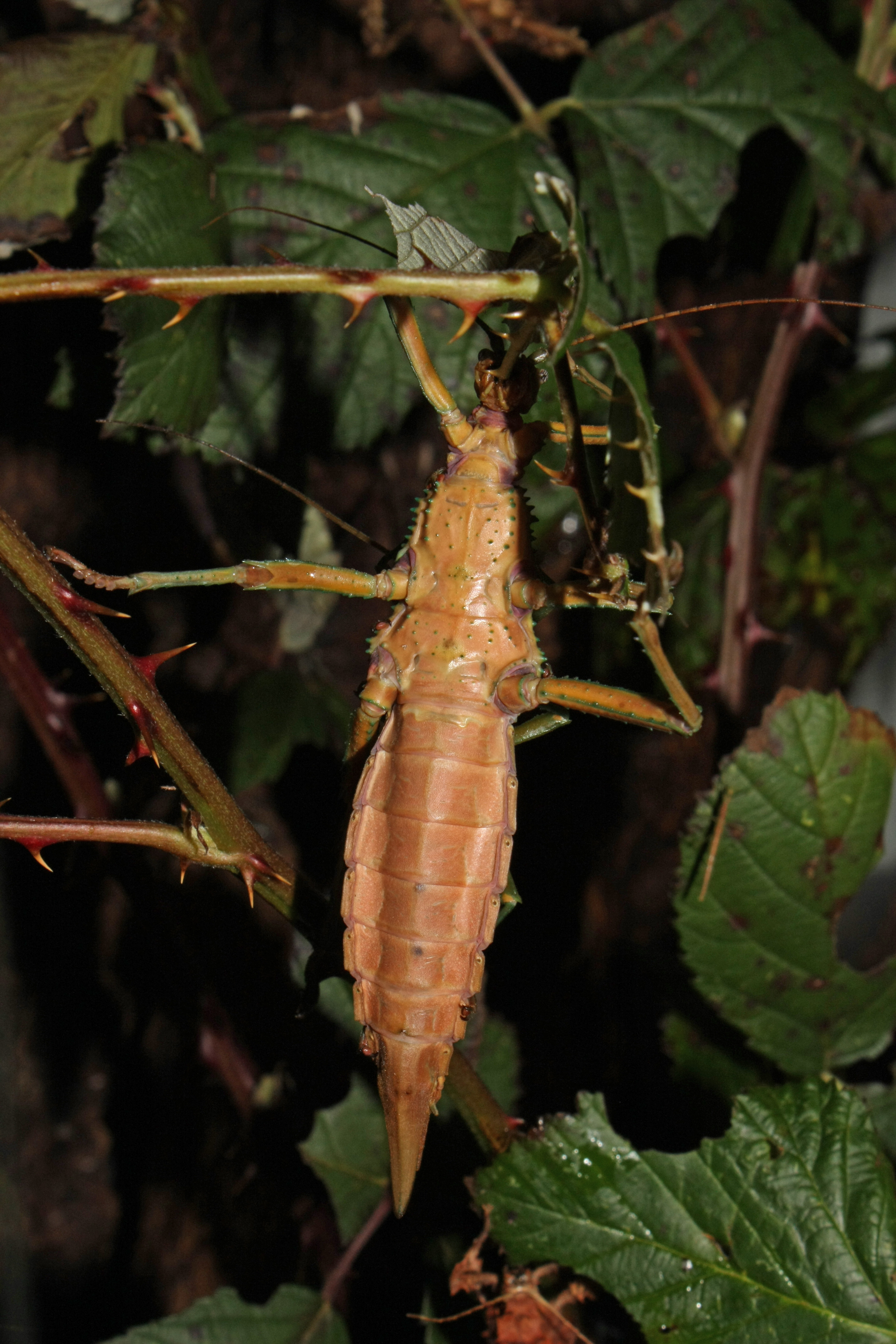
Ventral view of a freshly adult female
