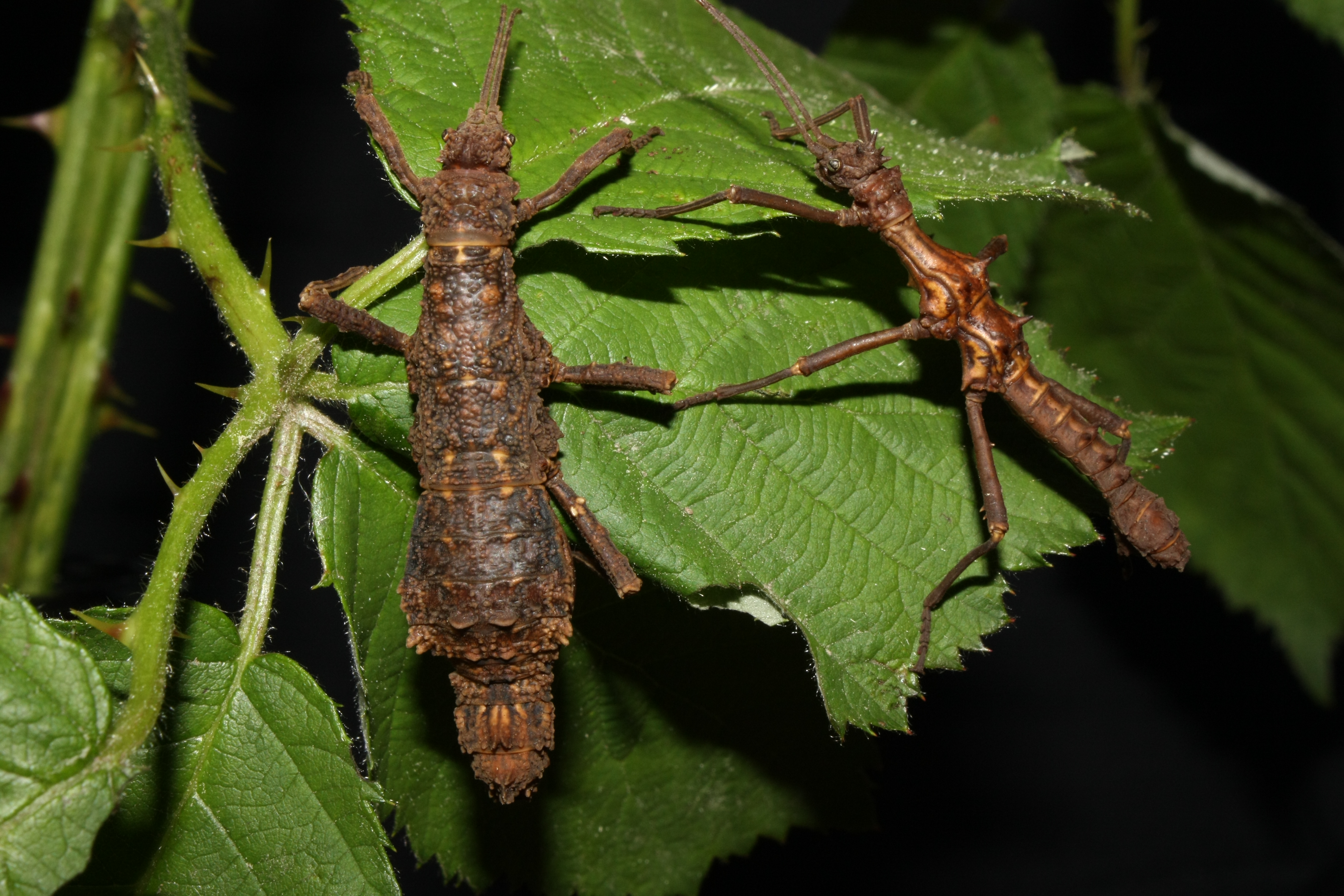
- Dares validispinus, pair

Scientific classification
- Kingdom: Animalia
- Phylum: Arthropoda
- Clade: Pancrustacea
- Class: Insecta
- Order: Phasmatodea
- Family: Heteropterygidae
- Subfamily: Dataminae
- Tribe: Datamini
- Genus: Dares
- Species: D. validispinus

Binomial name
- Dares validispinus Stål, 1875

= Dares validispinus =

Species of stick insect

Dares validispinus is a species of stick insects. Like most other members of the genus Dares, the species is native to Borneo, more precisely in the northwest of the island.

== Characteristics ==
The species shows the typical habitus for the genus. The females are about 40 to 50 millimetres (1.6 to 2.0 in) long, have no spines and many tubercles on the body surface. The coloring is mostly dominated by rather dark brown tones. Light brown to yellowish spots are often found symmetrically on both halves of the body. The underside is colored light brown to beige. The antennae usually consist of 24, rarely up to 26 segments. Their basal segment (scapus) is flat and has a tooth on the outside. As is typical for the genus, the abdomen of the females of Dares validispinus is widest in the middle and also highest there in adult, egg-laying specimens. Males, at 35 to 41 millimetres (1.4 to 1.6 in) in length, remain smaller than the females, but on average they are slightly longer than the males of the closely related Dares verrucosus. They are colored with a relatively high contrast. On the dark brown shiny body there are various longitudinally arranged, light brown to yellow areas, which result in a light central stripe on the abdomen. On the thorax, more precisely on the meso- and metathorax, several of these yellow areas are arranged in such a way that they look like a brown-yellow, especially from the side Stripe patterns work, which rise slightly towards the spines and thus appear a bit wavy. The legs are also completely colored dark brown. The males have four more or less distinct spines on their heads. At the rear meso- and metanotum edge there is another pair of spines. To the side of the spines on meso- and metanotum there is a further spike each on the pleura. In contrast to Dares verrucosus and Dares ulula, the males of Dares validispinus lack a distinct pair of spines at the front edge of the mesothorax. On the upper side of the posterior half of the abdomen there are 3 to 4 paired, spine-like lobes. The antennae of the males each consist of 23 segments.

== Distribution area and way of life ==
Dares validispinus is native to a wide strip in the northwest of the island of Borneo, where it has been detected from Sarawak via Brunei to Sabah. There is also evidence from the area Labuan.

This Dares species is just as nocturnal as the others of this genus. During the day the animals hide. In addition, their color and body shape make them easy to confuse with parts of plants. This strategy of camouflage (here phytomimesis) is not given up even if the animals are discovered. When touched, they drop to the ground and remain there motionless in playing dead. Only when there is no further contact do they slowly move back towards a suitable hiding place.

Only two to three eggs are laid on the ground per week. These are approximately spherical and about 3.2 millimetres (0.13 in) in diameter and dark brown in color with irregular gray-brown spots. There are 0.3 millimetres (0.012 in) long, creamy white, curved hairs on the surface, which often causes the eggs to stick together. The large micropylar plate has three arms. One of the arms points in the direction of the lid (operculum) and almost reaches it, while the other two run circularly around the lower quarter of the egg. The almost round operculum has a diameter of 2.0 to 2.4 millimetres (0.079 to 0.094 in). After four to six months, the approximately 14 millimetres (0.55 in) long nymphs hatch. Older female nymphs are often contrasting reddish brown and brightly patterned. Often they show, as is typical for many members of the genus, a few bright, almost white spots at the base of the abdomen. It takes about a year for them to grow into imagos. Adult females can live to be around two years old. Males are more short-lived.

== Taxonomy ==
Carl Stål described the species in 1875 together with the genus Dares as their type species. The specific epithet "validispinus" chosen by him is borrowed from the Latin and means "strongly thorny". Klaus Günther introduced the species in 1935 as synonym to Dares ulula. The Austrian entomologist Burghard Hausleithner identified the specimens examined by him in 1991 at the Natural History Museum, Vienna as Dares validispinus and despite this synonymization synonymized Dares verrucosus with this one. Philip Edward Bragg found in 1998 in the specimens examined by Hausleithner that only the females belong to Dares validispinus, while the male nymph is a representative of Dares verrucosus which was thereby validated again. From the two males described by Stål and deposited as paralectotypes in the Natural History Museum Vienna, one animal was selected as the lectotype.

== Terraristic ==
Allan Harmann and Mary Salton brought the first living specimens of this species from the Niah National Park in Sarawak to Great Britain in 1979/80. This makes Dares validispinus the first species of the genus that was cultivated in the terrariums of European enthusiasts. Further imports were made, for example, in 1994 by Mel Herbert from Brunei and in 1996 by Frank H. Hennemann and Oskar V. Conle from Mount Serapi in Sarawak. A stock that Jonah Voo Zhong Xuan collected in Sabah in 2017 and has been breeding since then is referred to as Dares validispinus 'Kiansom' with details of the place where it was found.

Dares validispinus is easy to keep and breed. A higher humidity is preferred, which can be achieved by a layer of soil covered with moist moss. In breeding, the leaves of bramble and many other Rosaceae are eaten, as well as those of hazel, oak and Gaultheria shallon (salal).

Dares validispinus is listed by the Phasmid Study Group under PSG number 38.
