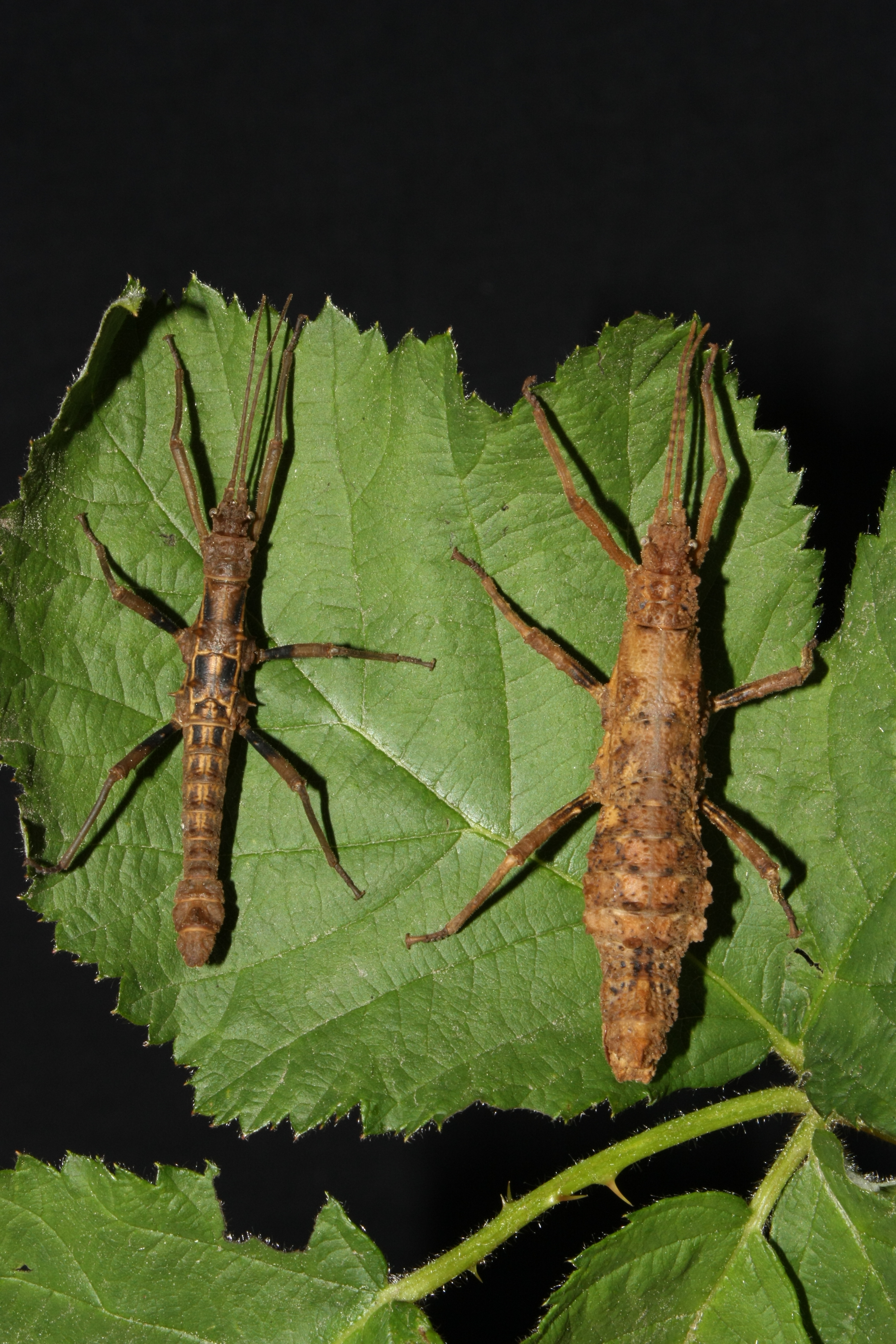
- Dares verrucosus, pair

Scientific classification
- Kingdom: Animalia
- Phylum: Arthropoda
- Clade: Pancrustacea
- Class: Insecta
- Order: Phasmatodea
- Superfamily: Bacilloidea
- Family: Heteropterygidae
- Subfamily: Dataminae
- Tribe: Datamini
- Genus: Dares; Stål, 1875

Type species
- Dares validispinus Stål, 1875

Species
- List: Dares breitensteini; Dares kinabaluensis; Dares mjobergi; Dares multispinosus; Dares murudensis; Dares navangensis; Dares philippinensis; Dares planissimus; Dares ulula; Dares validispinus; Dares verrucosus

= Dares (insect) =

Genus of stick insects

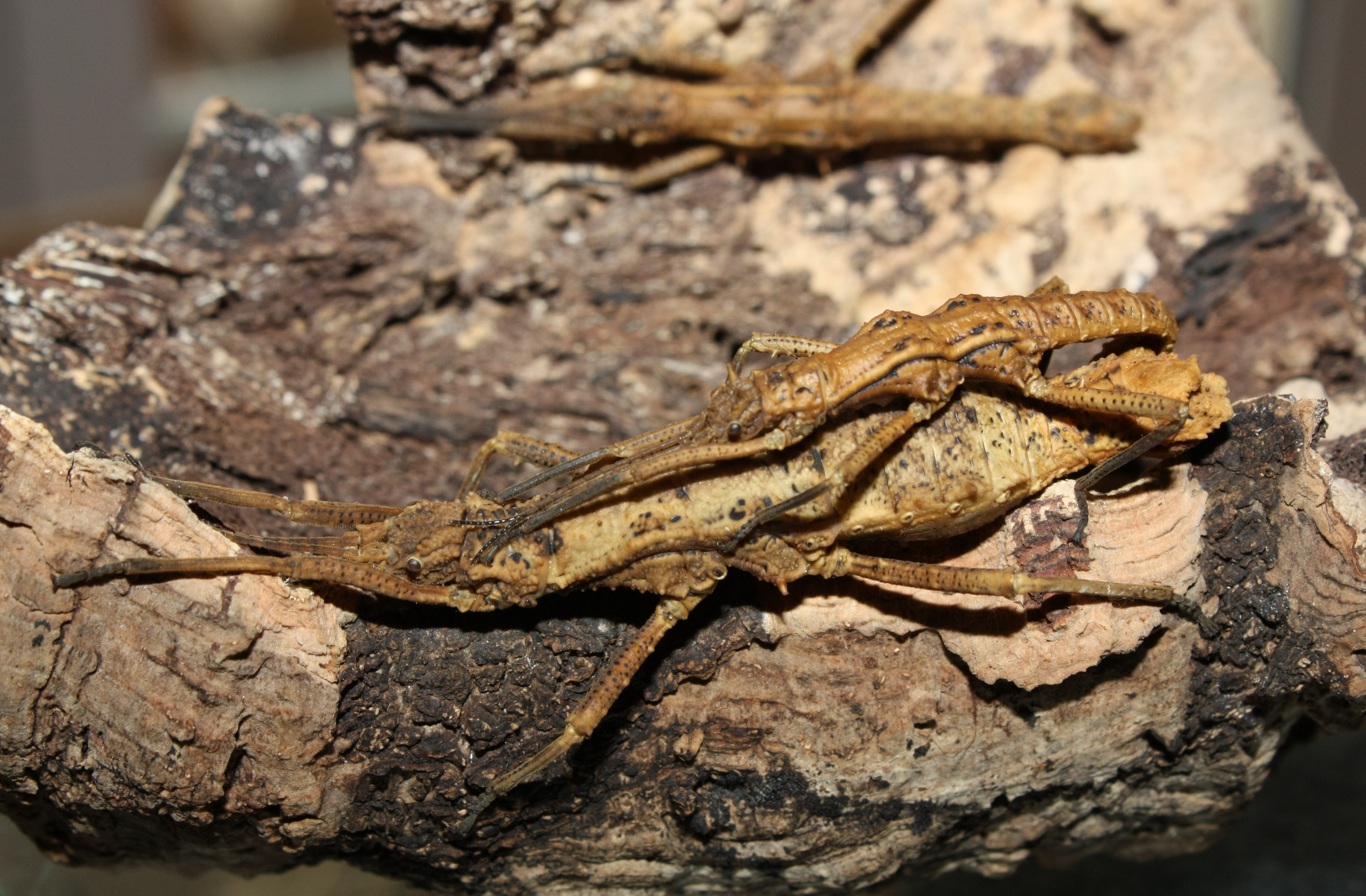
Dares philippinensis, pair

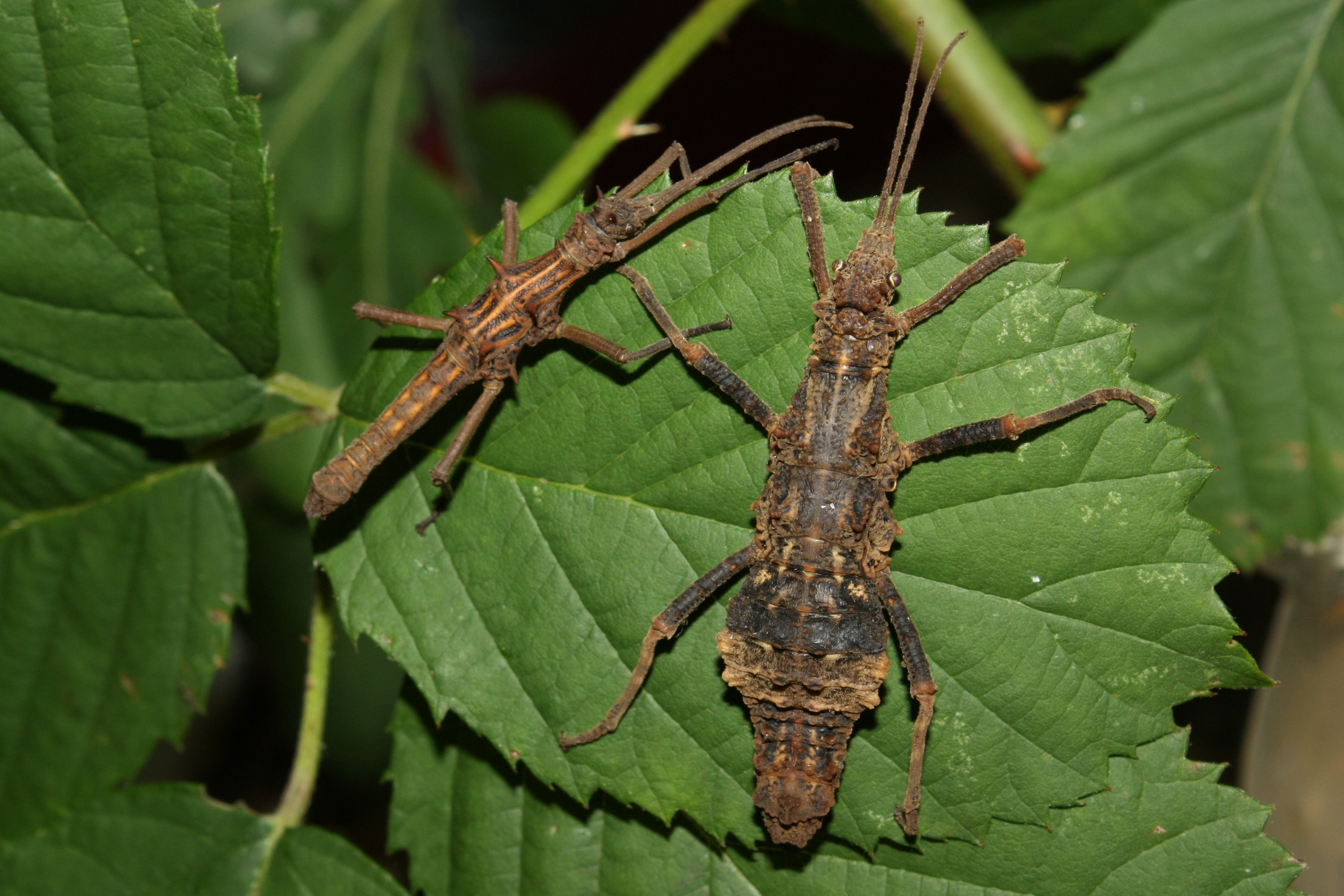
Dares ulula, pair

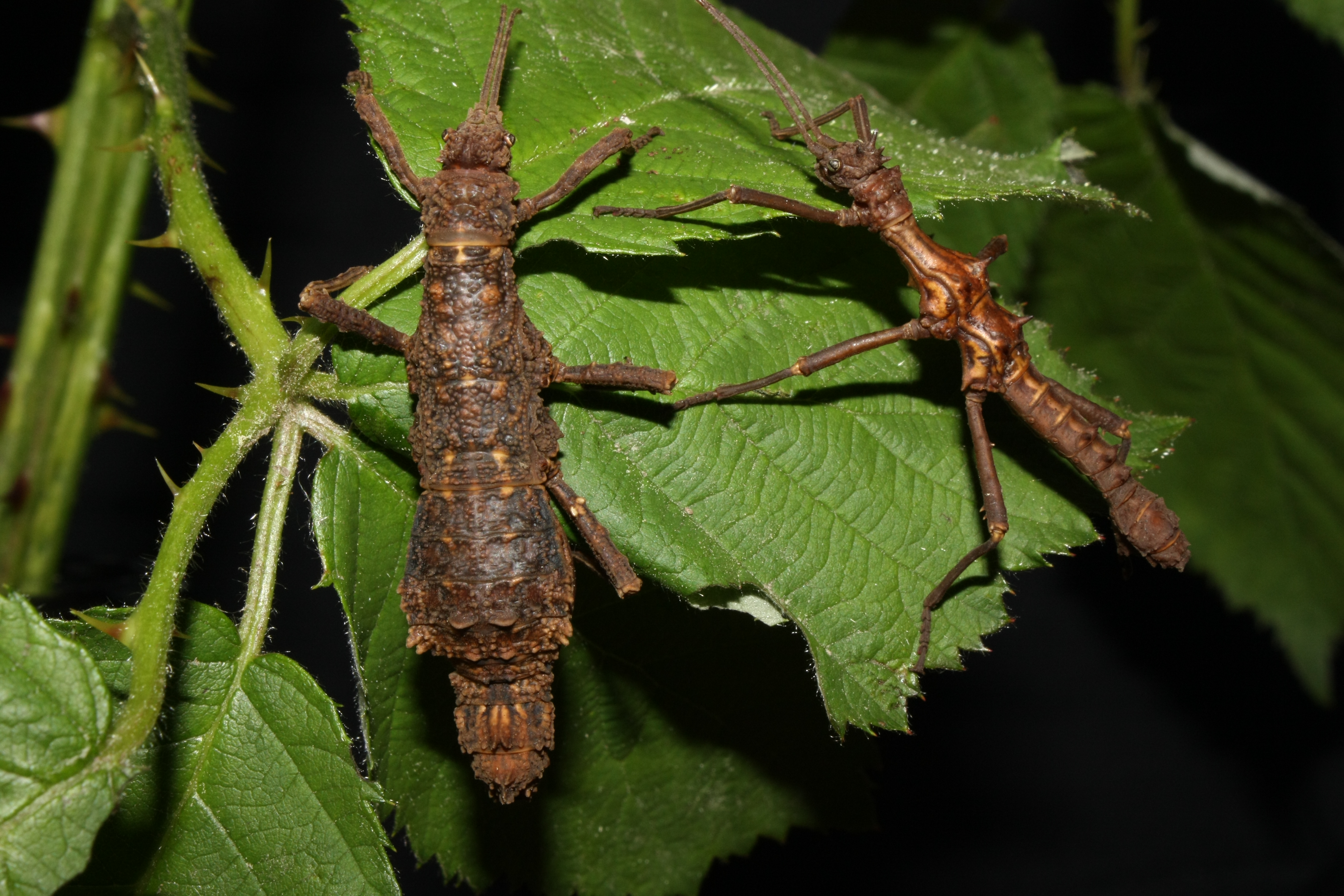
Dares validispinus, pair

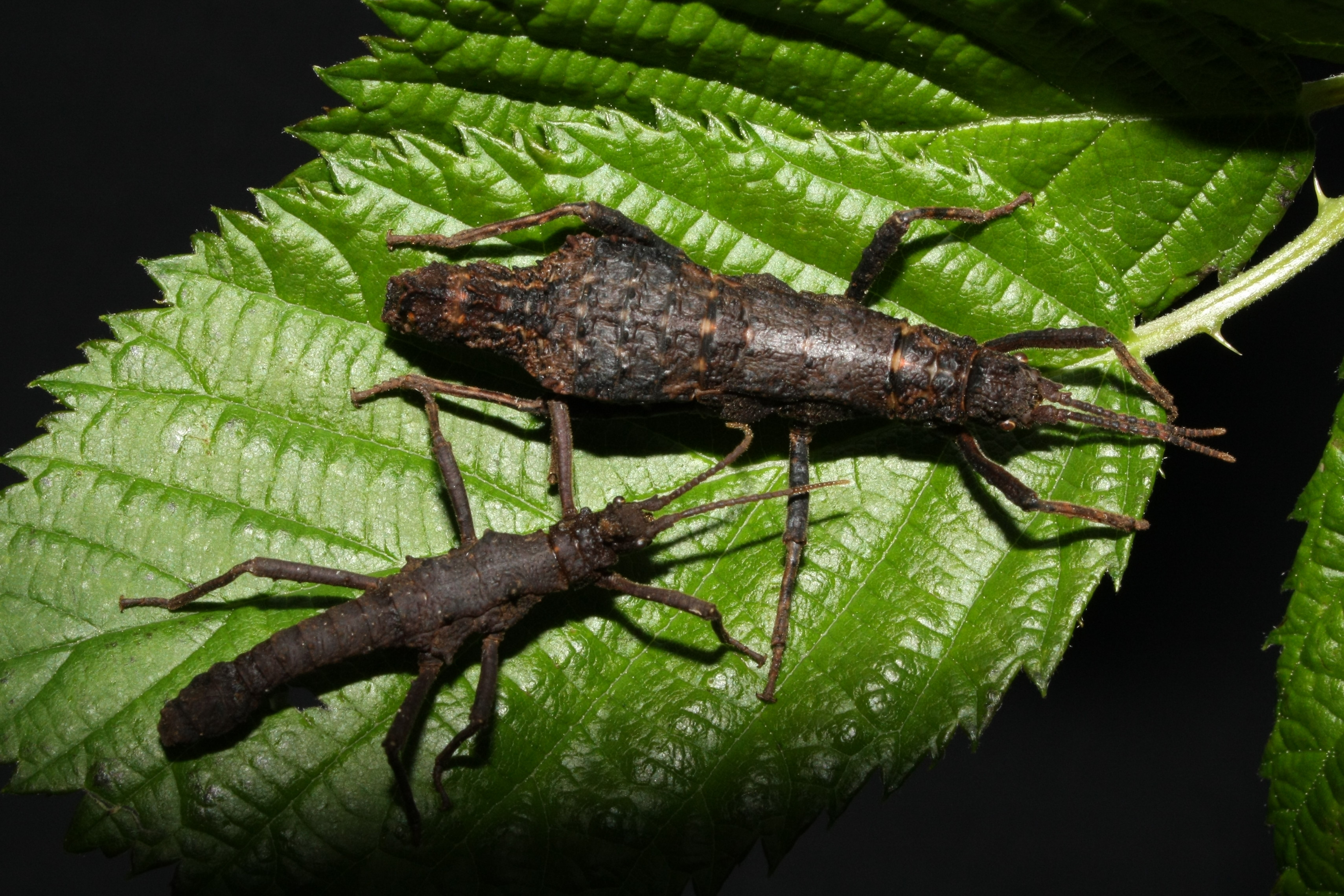
Pair of Dares murudensis, which are initially called Dares sp. 'Crocker Range'

The genus Dares, which is mainly native to Borneo, combines relatively small and mostly dark-colored Phasmatodea species.

== Characteristics ==
The representatives of this genus are very small with 25 to 45 mm in the male and 30 to 55 mm in the female sex. As is typical for Datamini, both sexes are wingless and the females have no ovipositor to lay their eggs. In contrast to other genera such as Pylaemenes or Orestes, the mesonotum is shorter than twice of the pronotum. The markings show different shades of beige, yellow and brown and the males usually have patterns that are more or less typical of the species. Also characteristic of the respective species is the development of the rather long and pointed spines of the males, which are on the head, the thorax and more or less pronounced on the abdomen can be found. The females, which are often less contrasting, are not prickly, but covered with tubercles all over their bodies. In the habitus they appear much wider than the rather slender males. In adult egg-laying females, the abdomen is clearly thickened. With them, too, the middle abdomen area is flattened on the sides and greatly broadened.

== Way of life and reproduction ==
The nocturnal insects hide during the day in the leafy layer of the ground or on or behind bark. They are very lazy during the day. When touched, they let themselves fall to the ground with their front legs and antenna stretched out, as well as bent middle and hint legs placed against the body, where they playing dead. The females lay only one to three eggs per week in the soil during their average two-year life. These are 2.5 to 4.0 mm long and 2.5 to 3.1 mm wide and, depending on the species, more or less hairy. The 7 to 15 mm long nymphs hatch after three to six months and need more than half a year to become adult.

- Dares
  - - Dares breitensteini
    - - Dares ulula
      - Dares sp. 'Semenggoh'
        = Dares sp. 'Kubah'
        =Dares sp. 2 'Kinabalu'
  - - Dares validispinus
    - - Dares sp. 'Mt. Pagon'
      - - Dares verrucosus
        - - Dares philippinensis
          - Dares murudensis

Relationships of the genetic analysis examined representatives of Dares

== Taxonomy ==
In 1875, Carl Stål established the genus Dares in the first description of Dares validispinus. In addition, he transferred a species already described by John Obadiah Westwood as Acanthoderus ulula in 1859 to this genus. In 1904, William Forsell Kirby specified Dares validispinus as the type species. Josef Redtenbacher described two other species that are still valid today, as well as two species that were later recognized as synonyms for Dares ulula. Philip Edward Bragg found five other Dares species in his extensive work on the phasmids living on Borneo, all of which he described in 1998. In the same work he also described a species found 20 years earlier on the Philippines island Palawan as Dares philippinensis. A species described the following year by Oliver Zompro and Ingo Fritzsche as Dares ziegleri was added to the genus Orestes in 2021 by Joachim Bresseel and Kawin Jiaranaisakul. A transfer of Orestes guangxiensis (then valid name Pylaemenes guanxiensis) into the genus Dares by Zompro in 2004, was reversed in 2006 by Paul D. Brock and Masaya Okada.

The differentiation between Orestes and Pylaemenes, introduced in 2018, was confirmed by Sarah Bank et al in their work on the spread of the Heteropterygidae, which was mainly based on genetic analysis published in 2021. With regard to the Dares species investigated there, it was found that Dares is a monophyletic group, which also includes two previously unknown or at least unidentified species (see cladogram).

Valid species are: Gültige Arten sind:

- Dares breitensteini (Redtenbacher, 1906)
- Dares kinabaluensis Bragg, 1998
- Dares mjobergi Bragg, 1998
- Dares multispinosus Bragg, 1998
- Dares murudensis Bragg, 1998
- Dares navangensis Bragg, 1998
- Dares philippinensis Bragg, 1998
- Dares planissimus Bragg, 1998
- Dares ulula (Westwood, 1859)

(syn. = Dares calamita Redtenbacher, 1906)
(syn. = Dares corticinus Redtenbacher, 1906)

- Dares validispinus Stål, 1875
- Dares verrucosus Redtenbacher, 1906
  - Dares verrucosus verrucosus Redtenbacher, 1906
  - Dares verrucosus tawauensis Seow-Choen, 2016

== Terraristic ==
Five species can be found in the terrariums of lovers. Dares validispinus was first introduced in 1979 and was given PSG number 38 by the Phasmid Study Group. Dares verrucosus has been introduced several times since 1984 and was given PSG number 69. Since 1991 has been repeatedly imported Dares ulula listed under PSG number 117. It is considered the most delicate of the species in breeding. Similar or identical to Dares ulula is a breeding stock which is referred to as Dares spec. 'Gunung Gading' after its location in Sarawak. In addition, under the PSG number 332, a species collected by Bragg and Paul Jenning in 2006 is in breeding, which is initially named Dares sp. 'Crocker Range'. It was identified in 2014 by Thies Büscher as Dares murudensis described by Bragg in 1998 on the basis of a female. The fifth species, Dares philippinensis, has been kept and bred since around 2010/2011. She received the PSG number 331.

Dares species only need small terrariums with high humidity and a substrate to lay their eggs. Almost all of them can be fed with leaves of bramble (blackberries) or oak.
