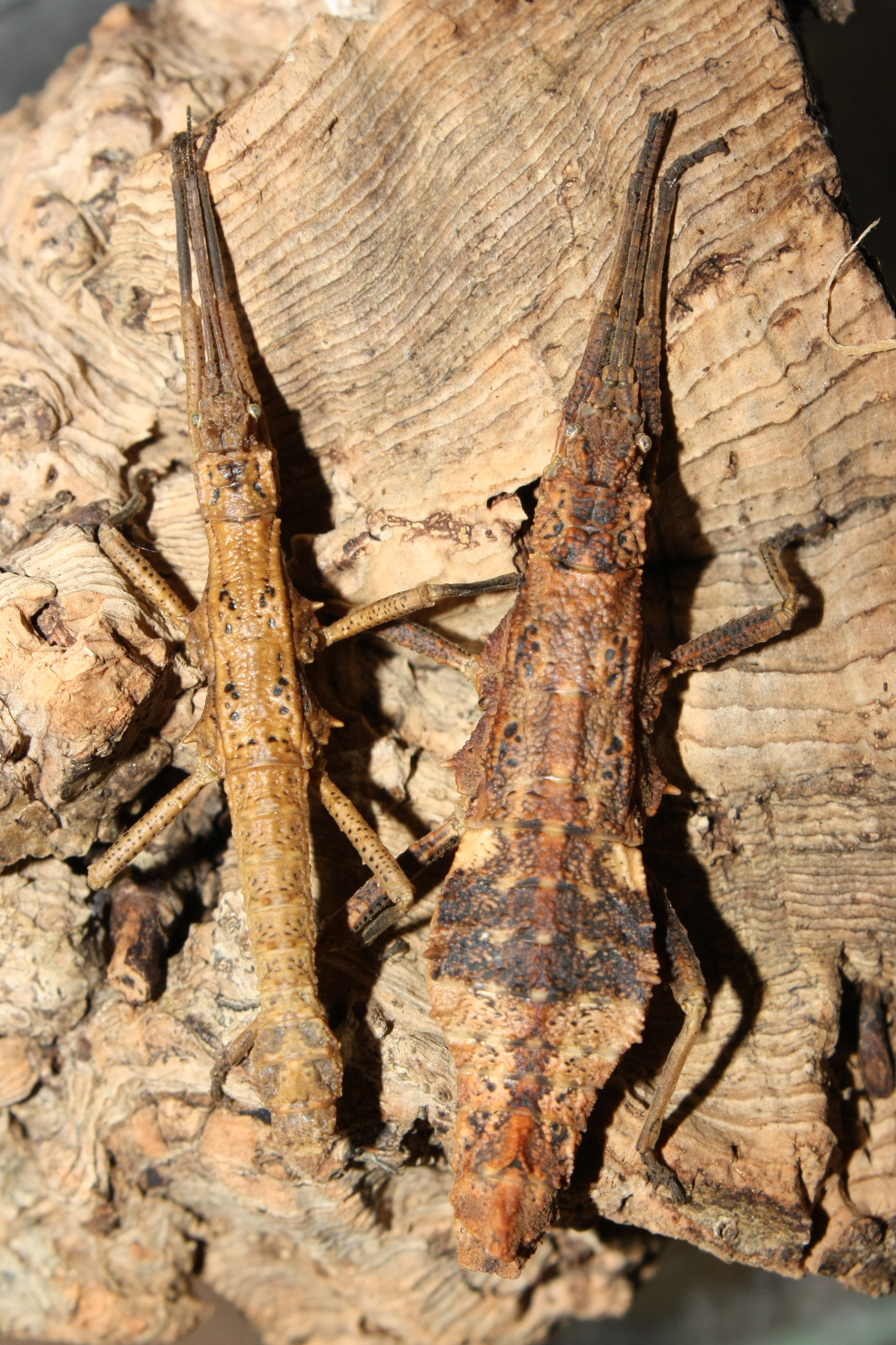
- Dares philippinensis, pair

Scientific classification
- Kingdom: Animalia
- Phylum: Arthropoda
- Class: Insecta
- Order: Phasmatodea
- Family: Heteropterygidae
- Subfamily: Dataminae
- Tribe: Datamini
- Genus: Dares
- Species: D. philippinensis

Binomial name
- Dares philippinensis Bragg, 1998

= Dares philippinensis =

Species of stick insect

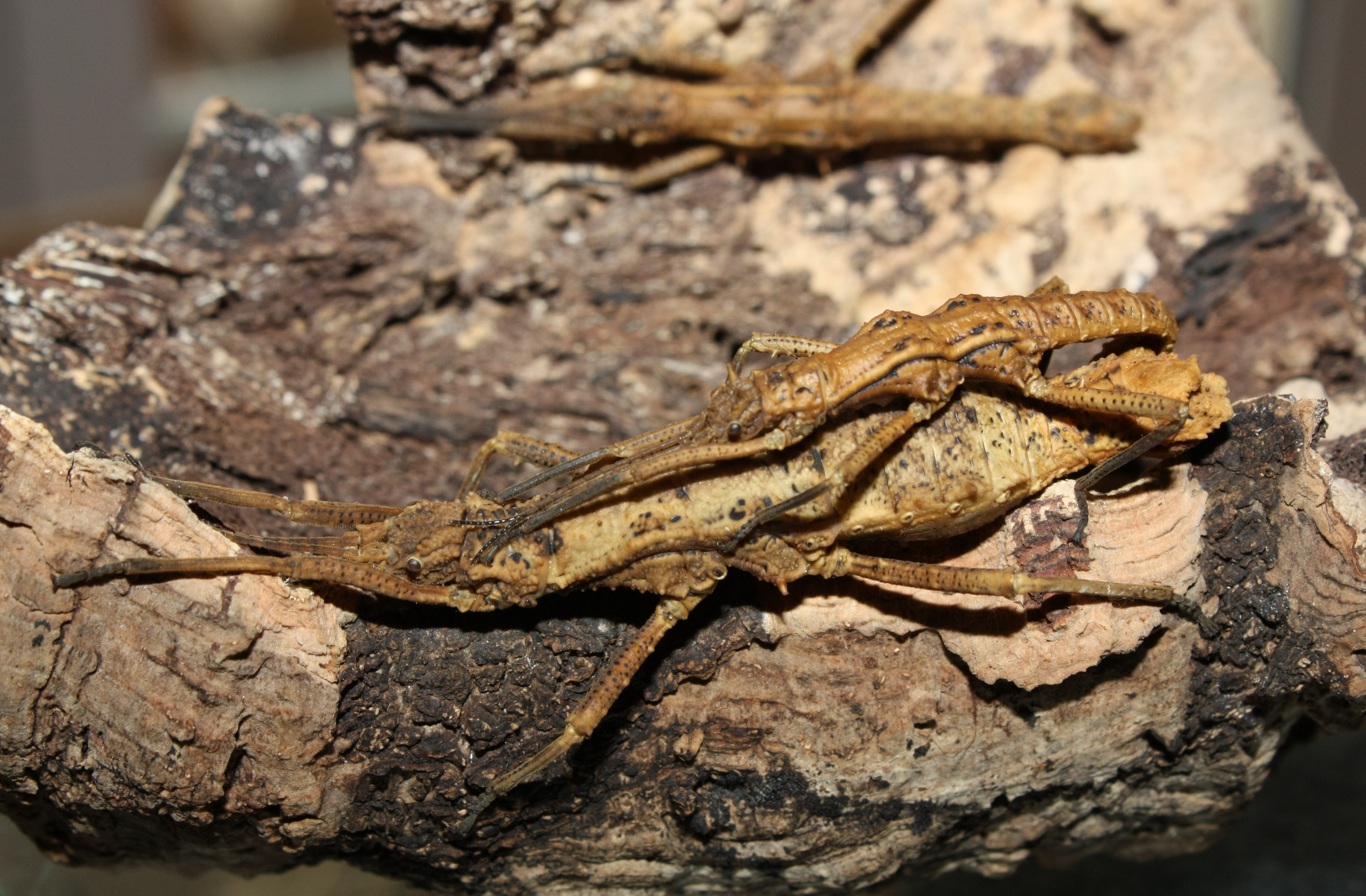
Mating

Dares philippinensis is a species of stick insects. This species is not native to Borneo like most other members of the genus Dares, but to the Philippine island Palawan.

== Characteristics ==
The insects show in both sexes the typical habitus for the genus. The antennae consist of 24 segments. Their basal segment (scapus) is flat and has a tooth on the outside. The 43 to 45 millimetres (1.7 to 1.8 in) long females have a body surface covered by tubercles. While most of the other females of the genus have no spines, the females of Dares philippinensis can often have relatively clear spines at the widest point of meso- and metanotum on the lateral edge, whereby a short spike is formed per segment and side. In the top view, four spines can be seen. The coloring of the females is more contrasting than that of the males. Usually a lighter brown dominates, which often deviates into a reddish shade. There are also darker specimens and those with dark brown patterns. The pair of white spots typical of many older nymphs of the genus at the base of the abdomen is often still a light area in the adult females of this species to find. Overall, the females resemble those of Dares verrucosus. This also applies to the 34 to 35 millimetres (1.3 to 1.4 in) long males. Their basic color is usually light brown. Black spots or dots can be found especially on the rear area of the meso- and metanotum and can merge to form lines. In addition, a black-brown continuous line runs along the side of the pleura of meso- and metathorax. There are no distinct spines on the top of the meso- and metanotum. Only on the side are four spines in the same places where they can also appear in the females. In addition, the males have four distinct spines on their heads. The tibiae of their legs are colored black. On the upper side of the abdomen there are small lobes on the segments that grow larger towards the end of the abdomen.

== Distribution area and way of life ==
Dares philippinensis has so far only been found on the Philippine island Palawan.

In its nocturnal way of life and defensive behavior, it is similar to the other Dares species. Also with Dares philippinensis the defense strategy consists in phytomimesis. This is achieved through color and body shape, but also through behavior in the event of a disturbance (dropping and playing dead). The eggs are almost spherical and dark brown in color with light brown spots and a few thick bristles. One of the three arms of the micropylar plate reaches the edge of the lid, the other two run circularly around the egg.

== Discovery and taxonomy ==
The first specimen of the species, a female nymph, was found by R. Rodriguez in 1974 on Palawan. Other specimens, both adults and nymphs, were found by C. L. Chan 1983 also in Palawan in Brooke's Point. He left this in 1994 Philip Edward Bragg, who recognized it as a representative of a new species and described it in 1998. The chosen by him specific epithet philippinensis indicates the special position of the species in the genus, which is considered to be the only Filipino Dares species. It also leaves open whether the species, which has so far only been found in Palawan, is also found on other islands in the Philippines. An adult female is deposited as holotype at the Natural History Museum, London. This is one of the animals that Chan collected. Further species of his 1983 collection are deposited as paratypes at the Natural History Museum. The same applies to the nymph that Rodriguez collected.

== Terraristic ==
Dares philippinensis came into the European terrariums as the fifth species of the genus. The first specimens were distributed around 2010/2011 by the Dutch - Belgian Phasma under the name Dares sp. 'Philippines'. The species is easy to keep and breed if a higher humidity is maintained and a slightly moist substrate is offered on the ground for incubation of the eggs. Leaves of bramble and many other Rosaceae are eaten.

Dares philippinensis has been listed by the Phasmid Study Group since 2013 under PSG number 331.
