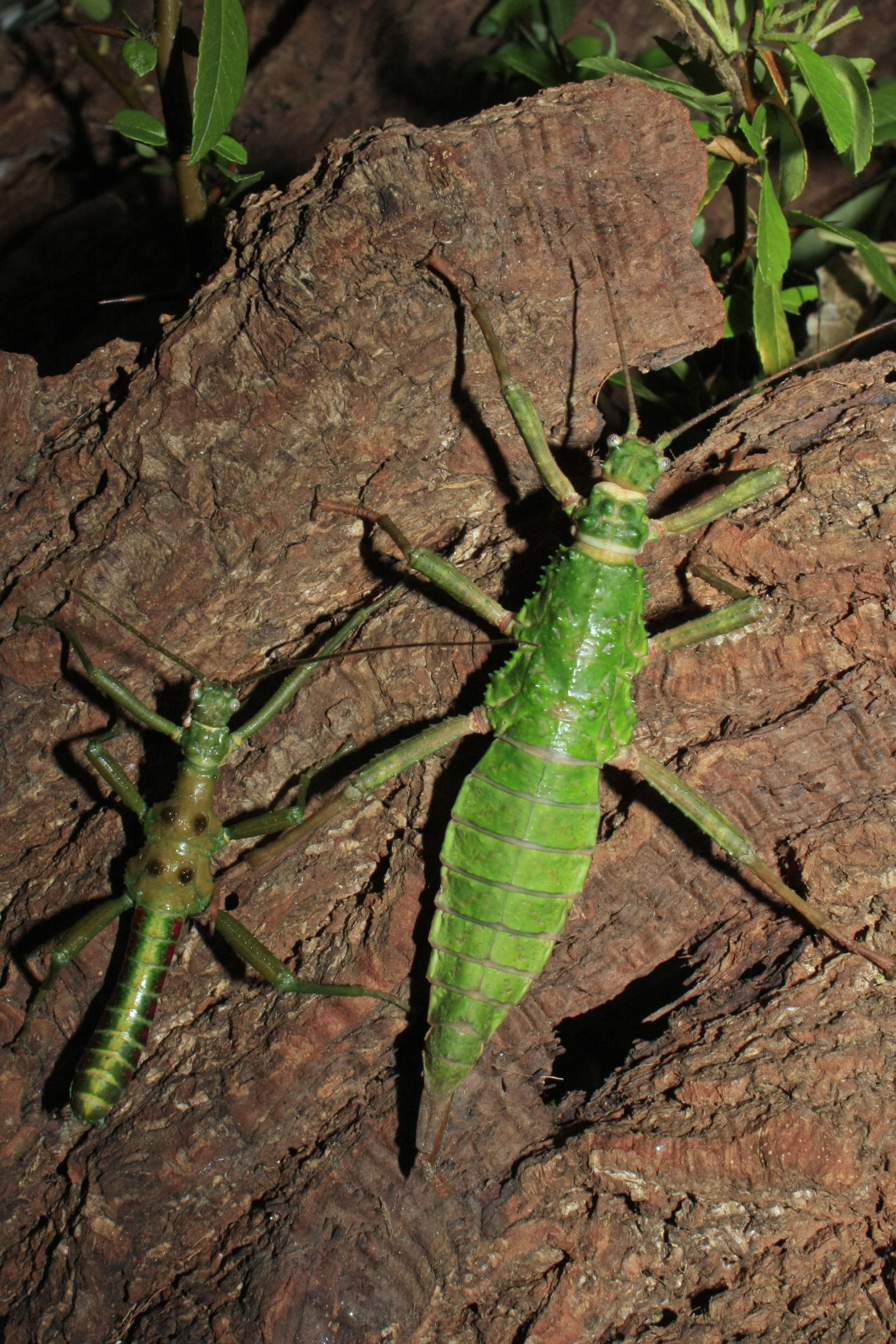
- Mearnsiana bullosa, left male, right female

Scientific classification
- Kingdom: Animalia
- Phylum: Arthropoda
- Clade: Pancrustacea
- Class: Insecta
- Order: Phasmatodea
- Family: Heteropterygidae
- Subfamily: Obriminae
- Tribe: Obrimini
- Genus: Mearnsiana; Rehn, J.A.G. & Rehn, J.W.H., 1939

Type species
- Mearnsiana bullosa Rehn, J.A.G. & Rehn, J.W.H., 1939

Species
- Mearnsiana bullosa; Mearnsiana maranao

Synonyms
- Hennobrimus Conle, 2006

= Mearnsiana =

Genus of stick insects

Mearnsiana is a genus of stick insects, which is native to the Philippine islands Mindanao, Leyte and Dinagat.

- - - Mearnsiana
      - Mearnsiana sp. 2 Mount Redondo
      - Mearnsiana bullosa
    - Aretaon
  - - Eubulides
    - - Obrimini sp. 'Negros'
        = Trachyaretaon negrosanon*
      - - Sungaya
        - Trachyaretaon

Relationships of the genus Mearnsiana and their sister genera investigated so far according to Sarah Bank et al (2021), *species assignment according to Frank H. Hennemann (2023)

== Description ==
The genus is considered the most colorful of the subfamily Obriminae or the entire family Heteropterygidae. The species are wingless in both sexes. The males of both so far described species have long antennae. They reach 4.35 to 5.1 centimetres (1.71 to 2.01 in) in body length, with Mearnsiana maranao being the smaller and spinier species. The basic color is olive green. meso- and metathorax are colored orange-brown above and below and have two pairs of slightly darker bumps on the upper side, which in Mearnsiana maranao are formed as longer tips. In the males of Mearnsiana bullosa the abdomen is conspicuously colored yellow, red and green. The live color of Mearnsiana maranao is not known, just like its females. The 8 to 9.8 centimetres (3.1 to 3.9 in) long females of Mearnsiana bullosa are colored bright green on the top or a more plain green-brown. Legs, antennae and ovipositor spines are light brown. The color of the underside varies from orange-brown to slightly purple. The abdomen ends in a long, straight ovipositor.

== Taxonomy ==
In 1939, James Abram Garfield Rehn and his son John William Holman Rehn described the genus using a male nymph of the also described Mearnsiana bullosa, which thus represents the type species of the genus. This male holotype was found at the Mount Apo in Mindanao and is deposited at the National Museum of Natural History in Washington, D.C. The name Mearnsiana is dedicated to the American ornithologist and natural scientist Edgar Alexander Mearns, who found the holotype at the Mount Apo. The specific epithet bullosa means "bubbly". Since the juvenile holotype of the species clearly differs from the adults, the species was subsequently described twice more in adults. Once by Ireneo L. Lit, Jr. and Orlando L. Eusebio in 2005 as Trachyaretaon manobo and again in 2006 by Oskar V. Conle as Hennobrimus hennemanni. The fact that both are synonyms of Mearnsiana bullosa became clear as early as 2008/2009, when all stages were known through the successful breeding of the species. They were officially synonymized in 2016 by Frank H. Hennemann et al. Sarah Bank et al. shows in their studies based on genetic analysis in 2021 that, in addition to the type species, there is at least a second, undescribed species in the previously monotypic genus. The female examined was found by Thomas Buckley and A. Mohagan on May 22, 2012 at Mount Redondo in the north of Dinagat Island. The second species of the genus, described by Hennemann in 2023, does not come from there, but from Lanao del Norte on Mindanao. It was described as Mearnsiana maranao from a single male deposited in the Museum of Natural Sciences in Brussels. The species supplement is dedicated to the Maranao people, a predominantly Muslim Filipino ethnic group native to the region around Lake Lanao.
