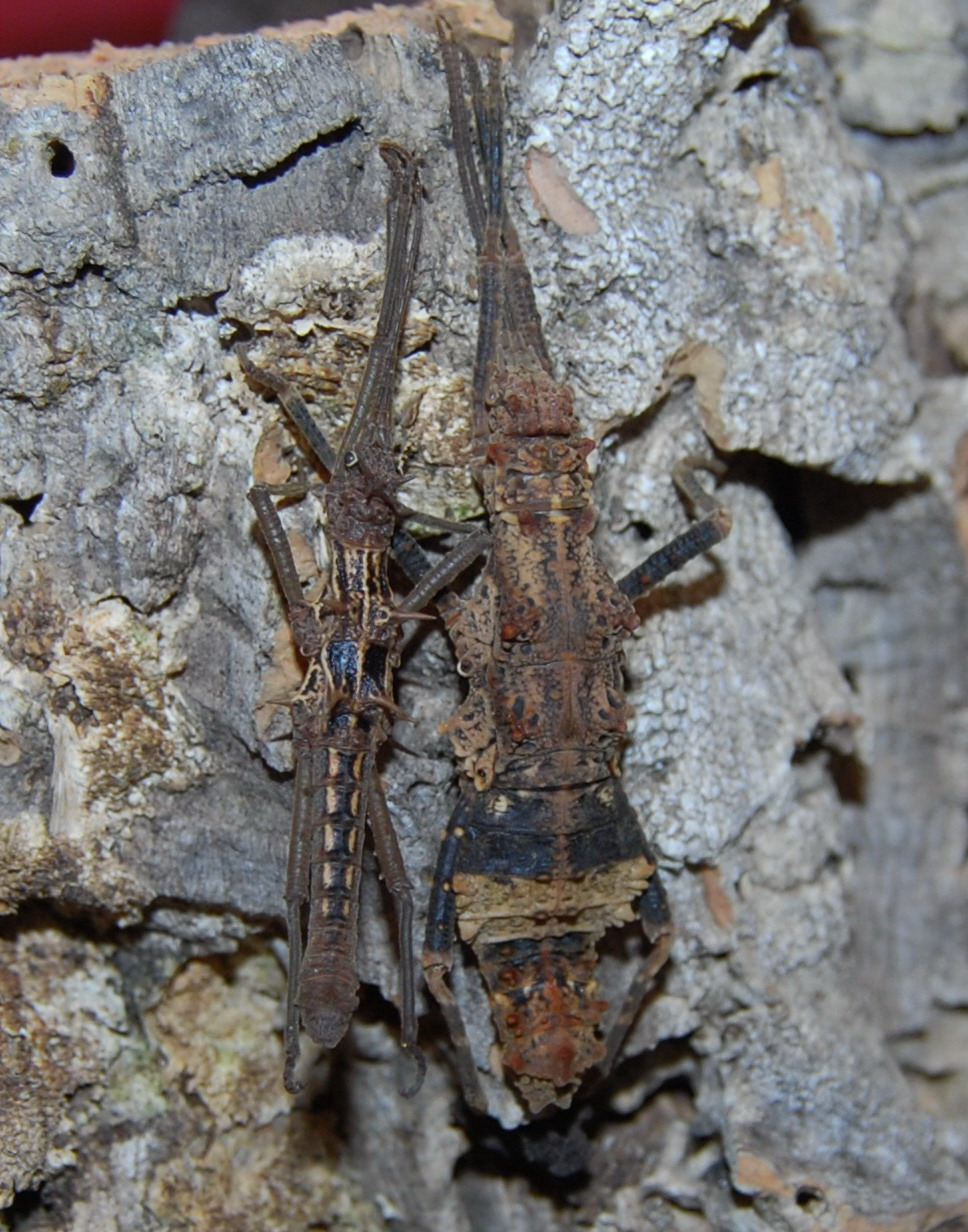
- Dares ulula, pair

Scientific classification
- Kingdom: Animalia
- Phylum: Arthropoda
- Class: Insecta
- Order: Phasmatodea
- Family: Heteropterygidae
- Subfamily: Dataminae
- Tribe: Datamini
- Genus: Dares
- Species: D. ulula

Binomial name
- Dares ulula (Westwood, 1859)

Synonyms
- Acanthoderus ulula Westwood, 1859; Dares (Dares) calamita Redtenbacher, 1906; Dares (Dares) corticinus Redtenbacher, 1906

= Dares ulula =

Species of stick insect

Dares ulula is a species of stick insects. Like most other members of the genus Dares, the species is native to Borneo, more precisely in the northwest of the island. The males are extremely prickly even for the representatives of the genus Orestes. Females are colored with a relatively high contrast.

== Characteristics ==
The species shows roughly the typical habitus for the genus. It is one of the largest representatives of the genus Dares. Females grow to be 44 to 51 millimetres (1.7 to 2.0 in) long. They are more contrasting than the females of other species. In addition to areas with different, mostly dark brown tones, there are also areas that are yellowish, orange-brown and black-brown in color. These areas can form wide transverse bands on the abdomen. The tubercles that are on the body surface are more distinct and higher in them than in many other species. Sometimes they are so pronounced that they form small, flap-like lobes or even short, blunt spines. The antennae consist of 25 segments. Their basal segment (scapus) is flat and have clear teeth on the outside. The abdomen is widest in the middle.

The males remain smaller than the females at 35 to 43 millimetres (1.4 to 1.7 in) in length, but are also very contrasting in color. While the head and legs are medium brown, the coloration of the thorax and the abdomen is dominated by dark brown and yellow to orange longitudinal stripes. The spines on the head and thorax correspond in their arrangement to that of Dares verrucosus, but are usually much longer than this. The males have four spines on their heads, at the front edge of the mesonotum and in the rear area of the meso- and metanotum there are a total of three further pairs of spines. To the side of it there is another spine on the pleura. There are no spines on the abdomen. The antennae of the males consist of only 23 segments. Their basal segment is also flat and have clear and relatively pointed teeth on the outside.

== Distribution area and lifestyle ==
Dares ulula is widespread in the Malay state of Sarawak in the northwest of the island of Borneo. Many previously known origins were destroyed by urbanization and the creation of new plantations.

With their defensive behavior and nocturnal lifestyle, this species differs little from other Dares species. Their defense strategy is based on phytomimesis. When touched, the animals let themselves fall to the ground, where they play dead until the threat has passed. The females lay their eggs on the ground. The eggs are not quite spherical and almost hairless. They are approximately 4.7 to 4.5 millimetres (0.19 to 0.18 in) long and 3.9 millimetres (0.15 in) wide. Their micropylar plate has four arms and the shape of an "X". The arms reach far around the egg. The nymphs are usually very dark in color and show conspicuously bright, mostly yellow-orange patterns around the resulting spines that increase with age or their stage of development.

== Taxonomy ==
John Obadiah Westwood described the species as Acanthoderus ulula in 1859. The specific epithet ulula chosen by him means "owl". The female nymph on which his description is based was collected by D. Wallace in Sarawak. It is deposited as holotype of the species in the Oxford University Museum of Natural History. In 1875 Carl Stål transferred the species as a second representative next to Dares validispinus in the genus Dares which he had newly established. Josef Redtenbacher described two species in 1906, both of which in 1935 by Klaus Günther synonymed to Dares ulula. One of these synonyms is Dares calamita. The females to which the description referred were deposited in the Hungarian Natural History Museum in Budapest, but are considered destroyed. The second synonym is Dares corticinus. Here Redtenbacher described a very young male nymph, which is deposited as holotype at the Muséum national d'histoire naturelle in Paris.

== Terraristic ==
The first live specimens of this species came to Europe in 1991. Both Philip Edward Bragg and Patrick van der Stigchel and even Ian Abercrombie brought specimens from Mount Serapi that year. Dares ulula was the third Dares species that got into the European terrariums. Since then the species has been introduced several times. It is considered to be delicate to care for, but because of its appearance it is the most sought-after representative of the genus.

Like the other species of the genus, it prefers a higher humidity, which can be achieved by a layer of soil covered with moist moss. Besides leaves of brambles and many other Rosaceae, the leaves of various Betulaceae are also eaten.

The Phasmid Study Group listed Dares ulula under PSG number 117.
