= Phasmid Study Group =

Group for entomologists interested in the order Phasmatodea

The Phasmid Study Group is a group for professional and amateur entomologists who are interested in the order Phasmatodea, i.e. stick and leaf insects, known as "phasmids", as well as other interested persons. Over 40 species of Phasmid have been named after members of the group. The group includes world experts in the study of phasmids worldwide.

The group was formed in 1980 and has since developed a worldwide membership. It has meetings twice a year at The Natural History Museum, London. It also distributes phasmids, free of charge, to its members.

The group has two publications. Phasmid Studies is issued occasionally and contains scientific papers and longer articles. The Phasmid Study Group's Newsletter is posted to each member twice a year, it contains shorter articles and announcements, and is printed in full colour with many photographs and much information on phasmids.
