= Karissa Sanbonmatsu =

American structural biologist

Karissa Y. Sanbonmatsu
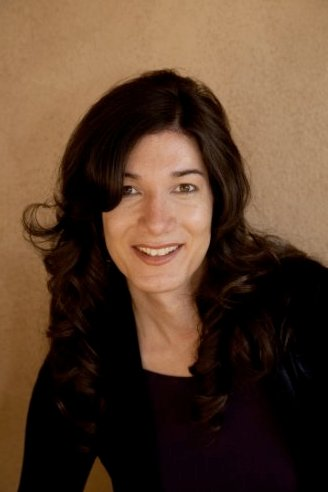
- Education: Columbia University; University of Colorado Boulder; University of Cambridge
- Known for: Structural Biology; First simulation of the ribosome First million atom simulation First simulation of a gene First billion atom simulation First structural study of a lncRNA; Quasilinear-Zakharov modeling
- Awards: Presidential Early Career Award for Scientists and Engineers; American Physical Society Fellow; Pembroke College Stokes Society Scientific Lecture Competition
- Scientific career
- Workplaces: Los Alamos National Laboratory; New Mexico Consortium
- Thesis: Competition between Langmuir wave-wave and wave-particle interactions in the auroral ionosphere
- Doctoral advisor: Martin V. Goldman

Karissa Y. Sanbonmatsu is an American structural biologist at Los Alamos National Laboratory. She works on the mechanism of non-coding RNA complexes including the ribosome, riboswitches, long non-coding RNAs, as well as chromatin. She was the first to perform an atomistic simulation of the ribosome, determine the secondary structure of an intact lncRNA and to publish a one billion atom simulation of a biomolecular complex.

== Education and early career ==
Sanbonmatsu was born in Rochester, New York, the daughter of Joan Loveridge-Sanbonmatsu, and Akira Loveridge-Sanbonmatsu, who are both professors of speech communication in the State University of New York. She attended Oswego High School, and was valedictorian. She won the Pembroke College Stokes Society Scientific Lecture Competition at the University of Cambridge. Sanbonmatsu studied physics at Columbia University, where she used the Very Large Array radio telescope to estimate the distance to supernova remnant G27.4+0.0 and its central X-ray source, which is now known to be a magnetar. Karissa's early research was in plasma physics. She earned her PhD in astrophysical sciences at University of Colorado Boulder under Martin V. Goldman (a student of Donald F. Dubois). Her dissertation entailed analytical treatments of non-linear wave-wave interactions in plasmas, elucidating the competition between Langmuir wave-wave and wave-particle effects in the auroral ionosphere. In 1997, after earning her doctorate, Sanbonmatsu joined Los Alamos National Laboratory as a postdoctoral scholar under Donald F. Dubois (a student of Murray Gell-Mann), determining the effect of kinetic processes on Langmuir waves in plasmas. She became interested in what distinguishes life from matter. In 2002 Los Alamos built Q-machine, one of the world's fastest supercomputer. The Q-machine allowed Sanbonmatsu to run the world's largest simulation in biology, publishing the first simulation of the ribosome in 2005, where she identified the “accommodation corridor” of the ribosome.

== Research ==
The Sanbonmatsu Laboratory at Los Alamos National Laboratory was established in 2001. They use a variety of wet lab and computational techniques to study ribosomes, long non-coding RNA (lncRNAs), riboswitches and chromatin. In 2005, Sanbonmatsu was awarded the Presidential Early Career Award for Scientists and Engineers. At the time, epigenetics was beginning to develop, and Sanbonmatsu realised that RNA could be involved in how genes are turned on and off.

Beginning in 2009, the Sanbonmatsu lab began releasing the Phenix/cryo_fit family of software in collaboration with many others. Built around the concept of native contact potential, it allows protein sequences to be fit to the 3D protein shape density determined by Cryo-Electron Microscopy. As cryo-EM overtook X-ray crystallography as the most widely used method for determining protein structure, the lab published 20 articles in 10 years implementing different software versions, many cited hundreds of times each. The software was used to determine the structure of Coronavirus spike protein and its interaction with human ACE-2 to cause infection.

Sanbonmatsu has also been a leading figure in structural studies of long non-coding RNAs in epigenetics. She studied COOLAIR, a stretch of RNA that controls the timing and flowering of plants. It works by controlling the internal triggers that tell a plant to stop flowering, which work in combination with a repressor protein called Flowering Locus C. When Sanbonmatsu studied the RNA structure, she found features that are similar to ribosomes. In 2012 her group was the first to describe the secondary structure in a lncRNA; the steroid hormone receptor activator (SRA). She went on to look at how the structure of RNA impacted the fate of a cell. She uses illumina dye sequencing for high throughput SHAPE probing.

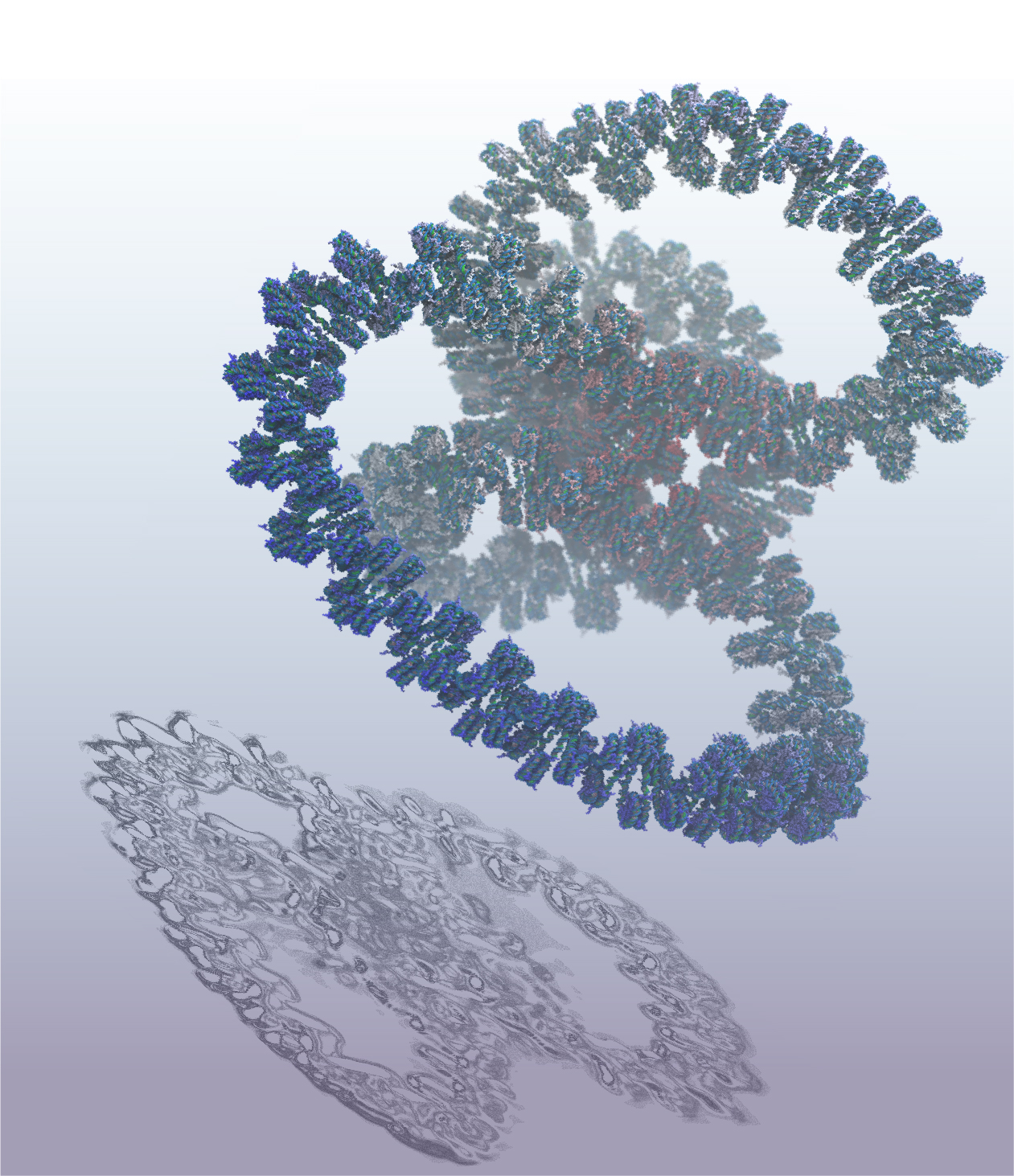
The first billion atom simulation of an entire gene (GATA4).

She develops computer simulations to understand tRNA translocation, combining single molecule fluorescence with cryogenic electron microscopy. Ribosomes undergo a dramatic change in structure when transfer RNA are passing through, and this was simulated computationally by Sanbonmatsu. Sanbonmatsu has also written about gynandromorphism, and how DNA influences hormones, but hormone can reprogram DNA. She was elected as a Fellow of the American Physical Society in 2012. Most recently, her group set the record for the world's largest published biomolecular simulation at one billion atoms, the first simulation of an entire gene.

== Public engagement ==
She described her work with epigenetics and came out as transgender in a 2014 TEDxTalk. Sanbonmatsu delivered a TED talk at TEDWomen on The biology of gender, from DNA to the brain, in November 2018. In the talk she covered epigenetics, how DNA can change due to trauma and diet, and how her gender transition led her to study the role of epigenetics in gender identity. Sanbonmatsu has served on the board of Equality New Mexico.
