= Helicos Biosciences =

Former life science company

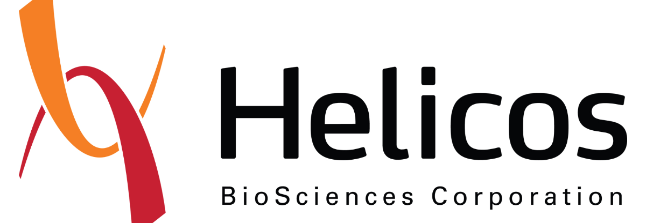
- Traded as: Nasdaq: HLCS
- Industry: Biotechnology
- Founded: 2003
- Headquarters: Cambridge, United States
- Website: www.helicosbio.com

Helicos BioSciences Corporation was a publicly traded life science company headquartered in Cambridge, Massachusetts focused on genetic analysis technologies for the research, drug discovery and diagnostic markets. The firm's Helicos Genetic Analysis Platform was the first DNA-sequencing instrument to operate by imaging individual DNA molecules. In May 2010, the company announced a 50% layoff and a re-focusing on molecular diagnostics. After long financial troubles, in November 2010, Helicos was delisted from NASDAQ.

Helicos was co-founded in 2003 by life science entrepreneur Stanley Lapidus, Stephen Quake, and Noubar Afeyan with investments from Atlas Venture, Flagship Ventures, Highland Capital Partners, MPM Capital, and Versant Ventures.

Helicos's technology images the extension of individual DNA molecules using a defined primer and individual fluorescently labeled nucleotides, which contain a "Virtual Terminator" preventing incorporation of multiple nucleotides per cycle. The "Virtual Terminator" technology was developed by Dr. Suhaib Siddiqi, while at Helicos Biosciences.

In the August 2009 issue of Nature Biotechnology, Dr. Stephen Quake, a professor of bioengineering at Stanford University and a co-founder of Helicos BioSciences, sequenced his own genome, using Single Molecule Sequencing for under $50,000 in reagents.

On November 15, 2012, Helicos BioSciences filed for Chapter 11 bankruptcy.

The patents that Helicos had licensed from Caltech (where Quake was when he made the underlying inventions) were subsequently licensed to Direct Genomics, founded by Jiankui He, a former post-doc in Quake's lab who gained notoriety in November 2018 when he created the first germline genome-edited babies.

== See also ==
- Single molecule fluorescent sequencing
- Pharmacogenomics
- Genetic counseling
- Genomics
