= Half-sider budgerigar =

Budgerigar variant

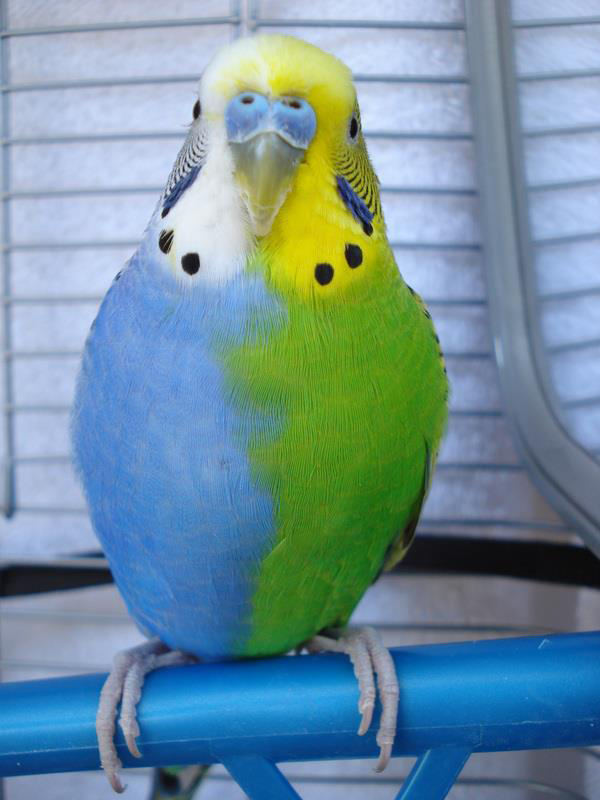
A domestic half-sider budgerigar

A half-sider budgerigar is an unusual congenital condition that causes a budgerigar to display one color on one side of its body and a different color on the other.

This is not a simple genetic mutation, as can be observed in other color and pattern variations in this species. It is a rare example of a tetragametic chimera, which originates when two fertilized embryos merge during a very early stage of development — between the 2-cell and the 64-cell stage. Each half has different DNA, with genetically distinct cells and the resultant bird is in effect two budgerigars fused together to form a single autonomous individual.

The half-sider's coloring is usually divided bilaterally down the center, although, it can differ depending on which stage the twin embryos merged during development. Twin embryos that merged later in development will result in a budgerigar that has a splotchier distribution of the different cell populations.

In the case of the half-sider budgerigar, both embryos must possess different genetic phenotypes (one yellow-based and one white-based) in order for a visible half-sider to be produced. If both "halves" were the same base, it would still be a tetragametic chimera, but not a half-sider. It is also possible for the half-sider to be male on one side and female on the other (evidenced by a half blue, half brown cere) – an example of a bilateral gynandromorph.

Breeding a half-sider is unlikely to produce more half-siders, even when breeding two half-siders together, as the genetic makeup of the half that contributed the cells that make up the reproductive system is that which would then be perpetuated, assuming that the bird is even fertile in the first place. The chance of producing another half-sider would be the same as for any other budgerigar pairing.
