= Gynandromorphism =

Organism with both female and male characteristics

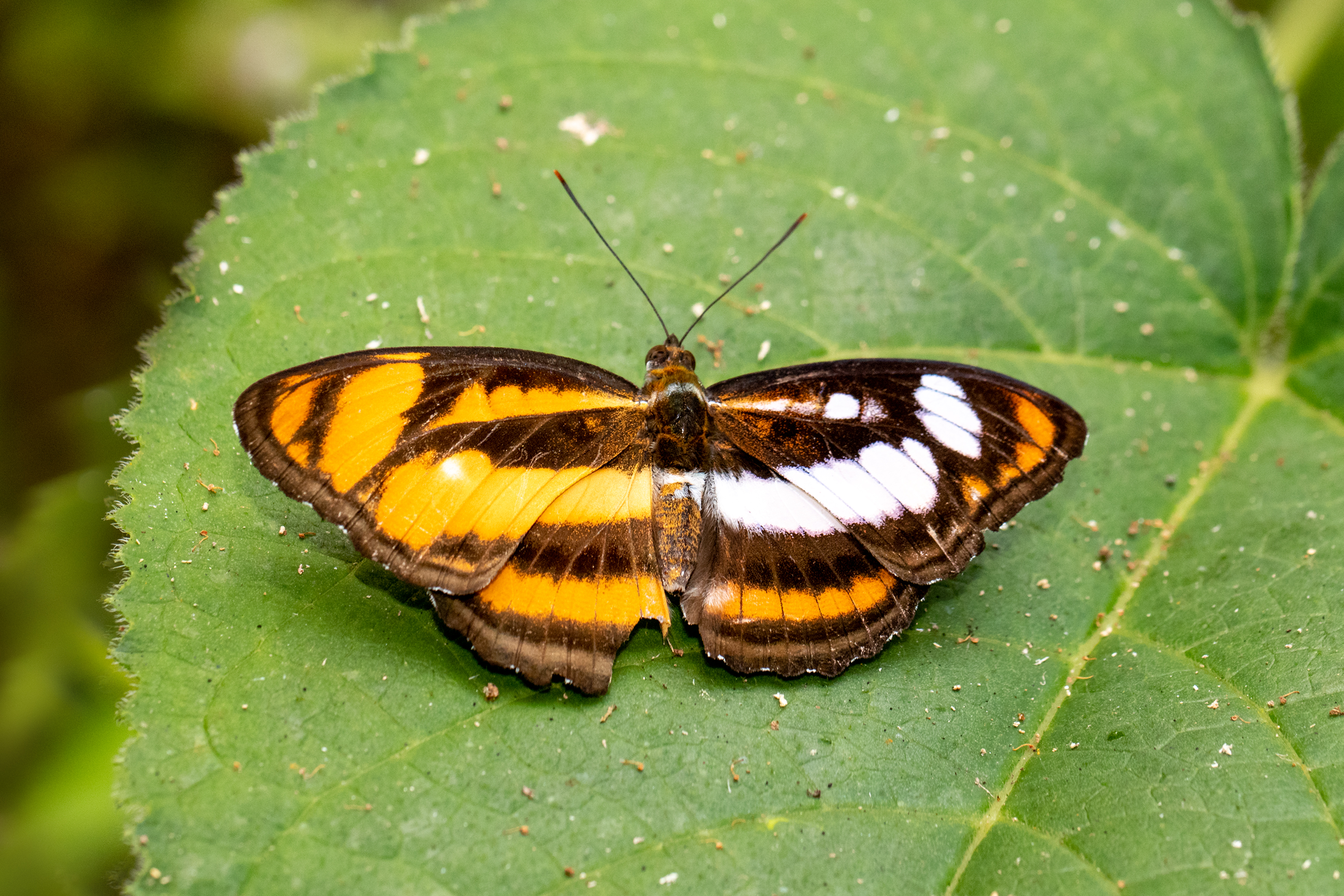
Gynandromorph of Athyma inara inara

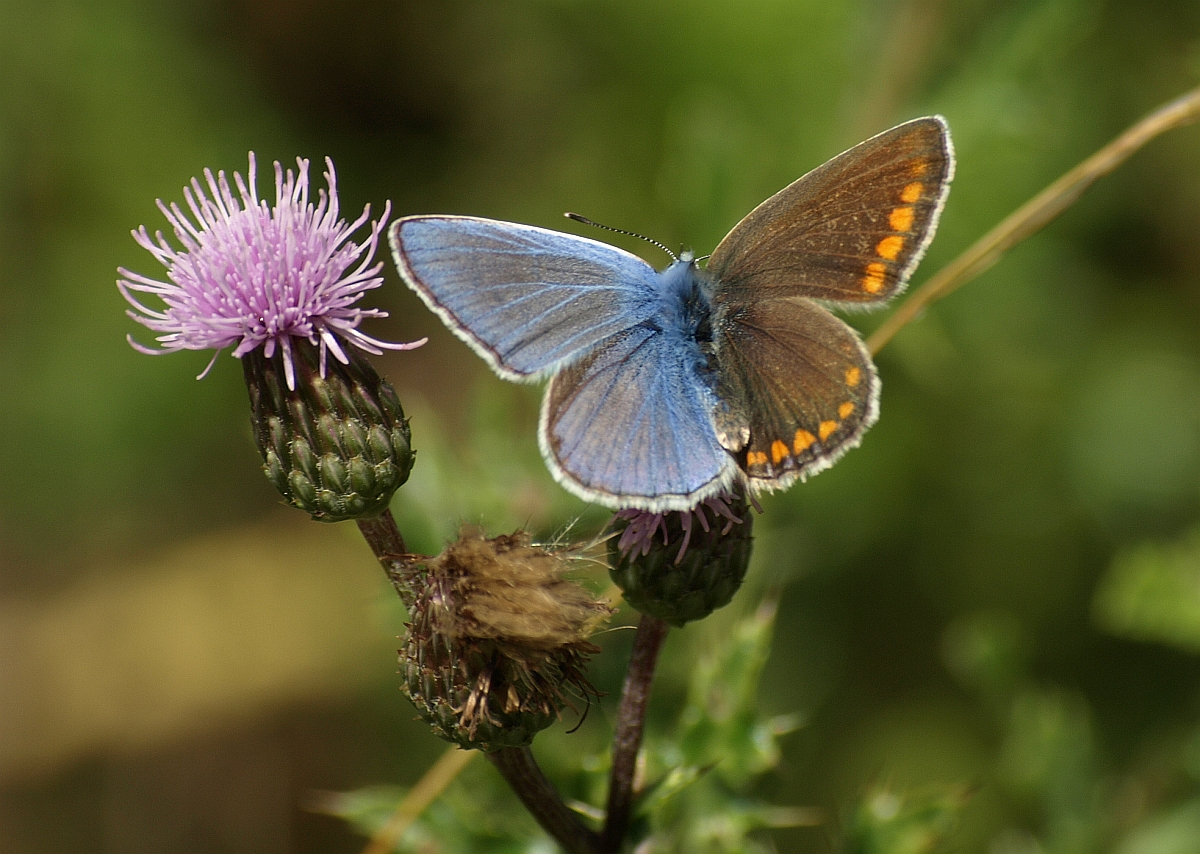
Gynandromorph of the common blue butterfly (Polyommatus icarus)

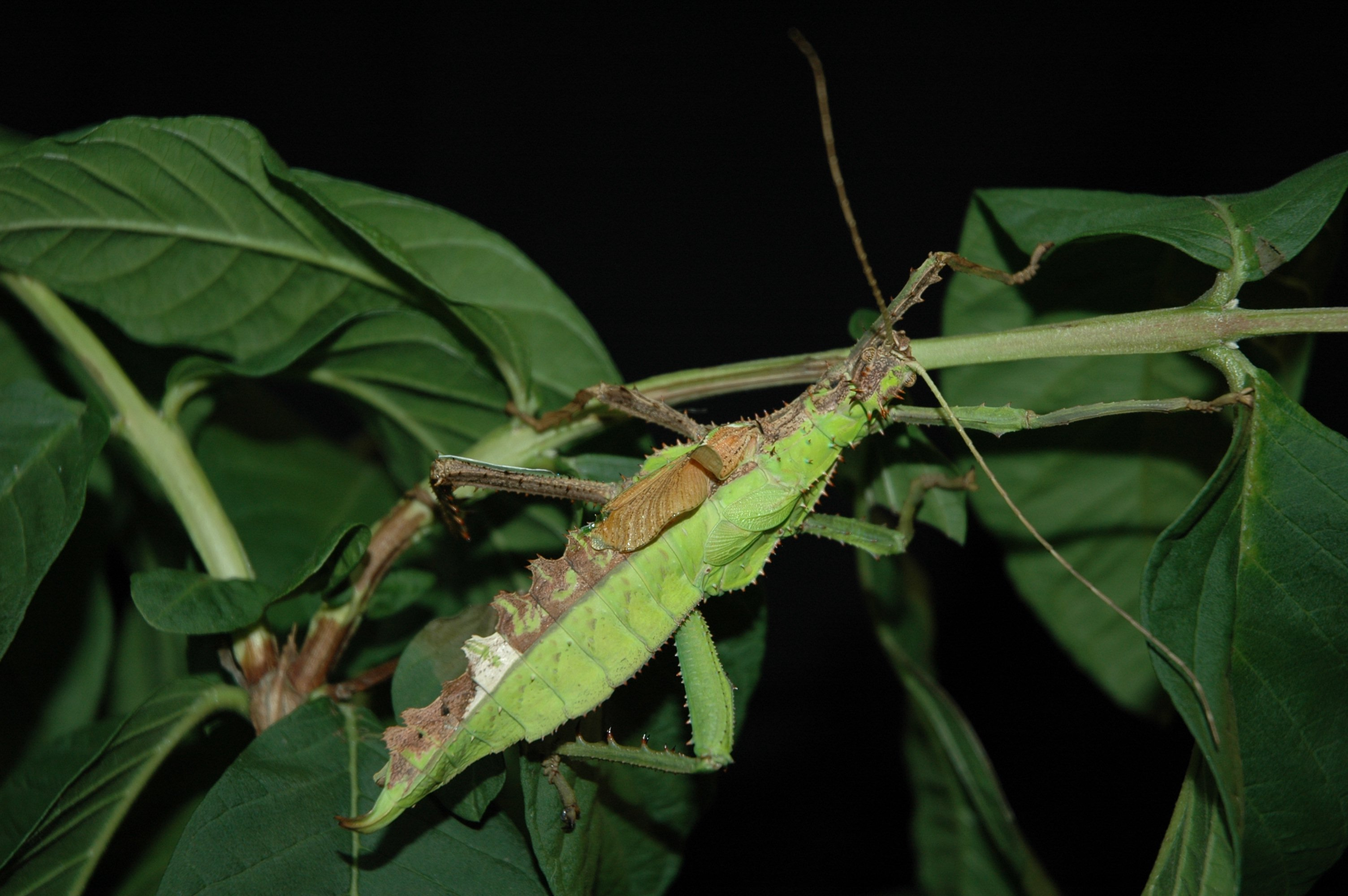
Gynandromorph of Heteropteryx dilatata

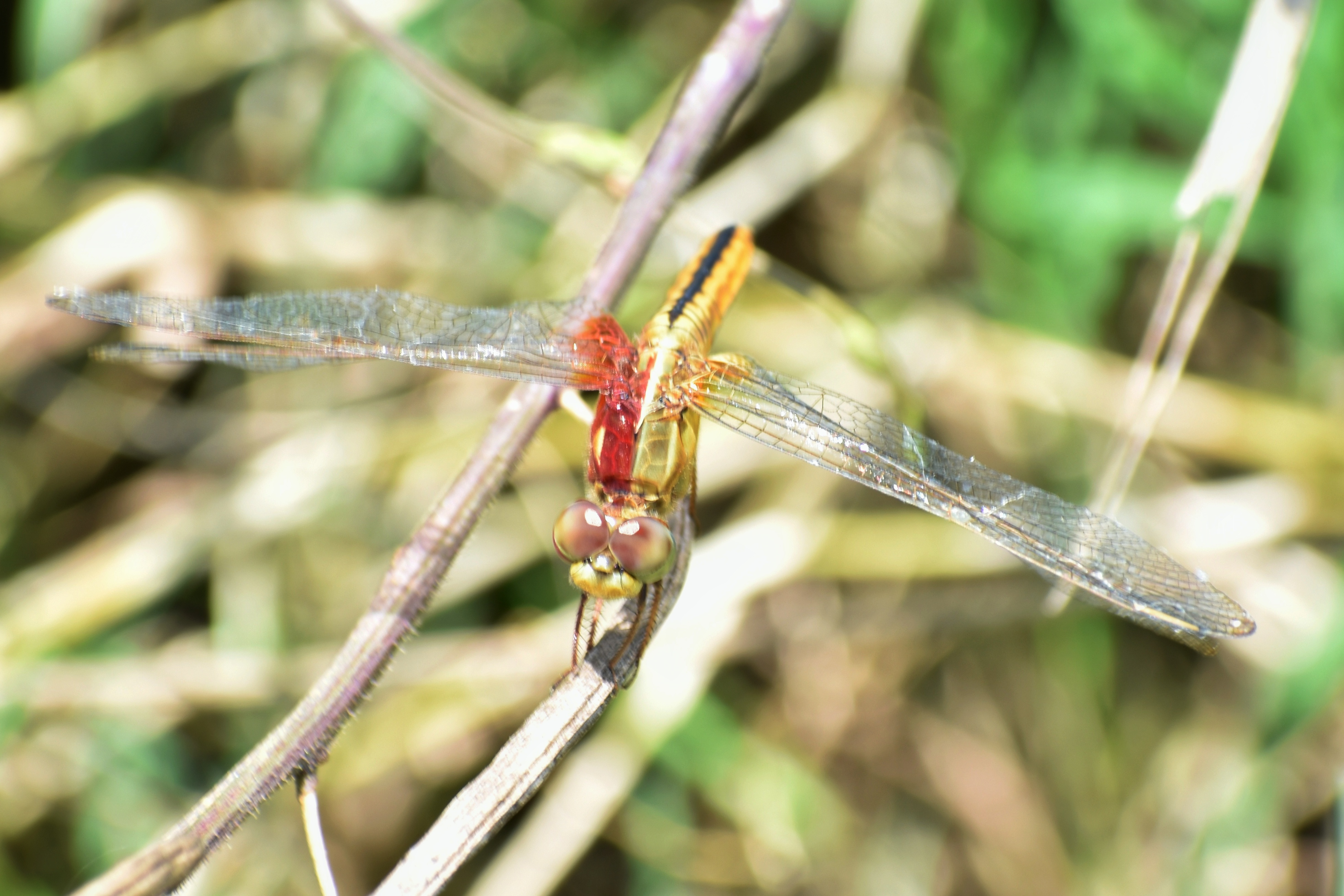
Gynandromorph of Crocothemis servilia

Gynandromorphism is the phenomenon that occurs when an individual organism possesses both female and male phenotypes due to genetic chimera of sex chromosomes in cells across the body and is most easily recognized in species that display sexual dimorphism. An individual who displays this characteristic is called a gynandromorph. The term comes from the Greek γυνή (gynē) 'female', ἀνήρ (anēr) 'male', and μορφή (morphē) 'form', and is most commonly documented within the field of entomology. Gynandromorphism is distinct from both intersexuality and hermaphroditism, although the terms are sometimes used interchangeably.

== Occurrence ==
Gynandromorphism has been noted in Lepidoptera (butterflies and moths) since the 1700s. It has also been observed in crustaceans, such as lobsters and crabs, in spiders, ticks, flies, locusts, crickets, dragonflies, ants, termites, bees, lizards, snakes, rodents, and birds. Although it can be seen in a variety of species, gynandromorphism is notably uncommon. Reporting depends on ease of detecting the phenomenon (whether a species displays noticeable sexual dimorphism) and how well-studied a region or organism is. For example, up until 2023 gynandromorphism had been reported in more than 40 bird species, but the vast majority of these are from the Palearctic and Nearctic; meanwhile, incidents in species from other regions may go underreported due to lack of data collection. An example of gynandromorphism was observed in a Bobolink (Dolichonyx oryzivorus) during 2026 in Chicago, Illinois, and was featured in popular media that noted other examples observed by birdwatchers.

== Pattern of distribution of female and male tissues in a single organism ==
Several patterns of tissue distribution occur amongst observed gynandromorphs. Patch-like patterns may arise, but commonly the phenotype presents in a symmetrical pattern, of which there are three main types: bilateral, oblique, and transverse. Bilateral describes an organism that is split laterally with one side possessing female characteristics and the other having male characteristics. Oblique refers to a diagonal line across the sagittal plane that separates the female and male phenotypes. Lastly, transverse is a separation of female and male phenotypes along an axis that intersects with what would be considered the primary axis for the body of a given organism.

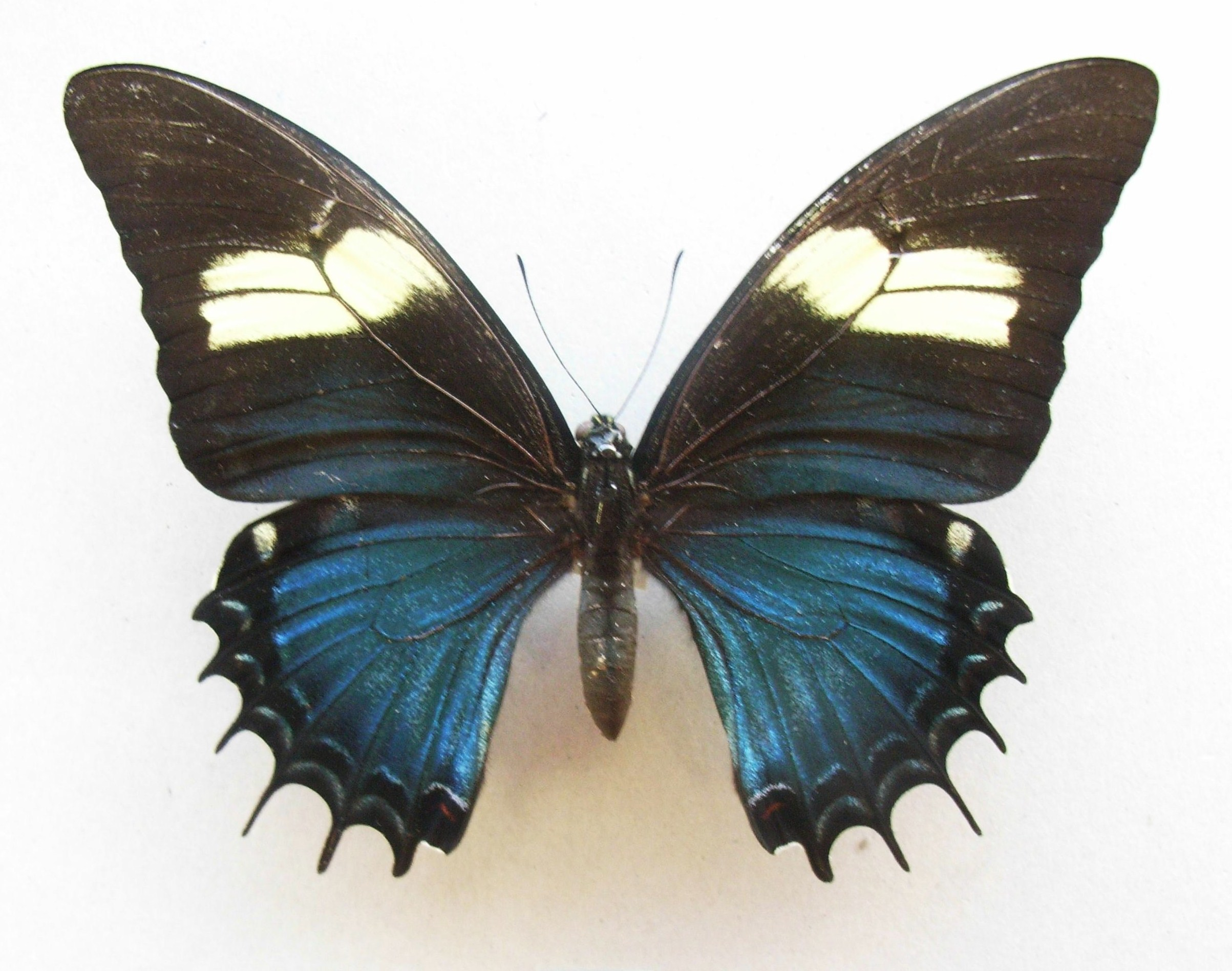
Normal female of Papilio androgeus

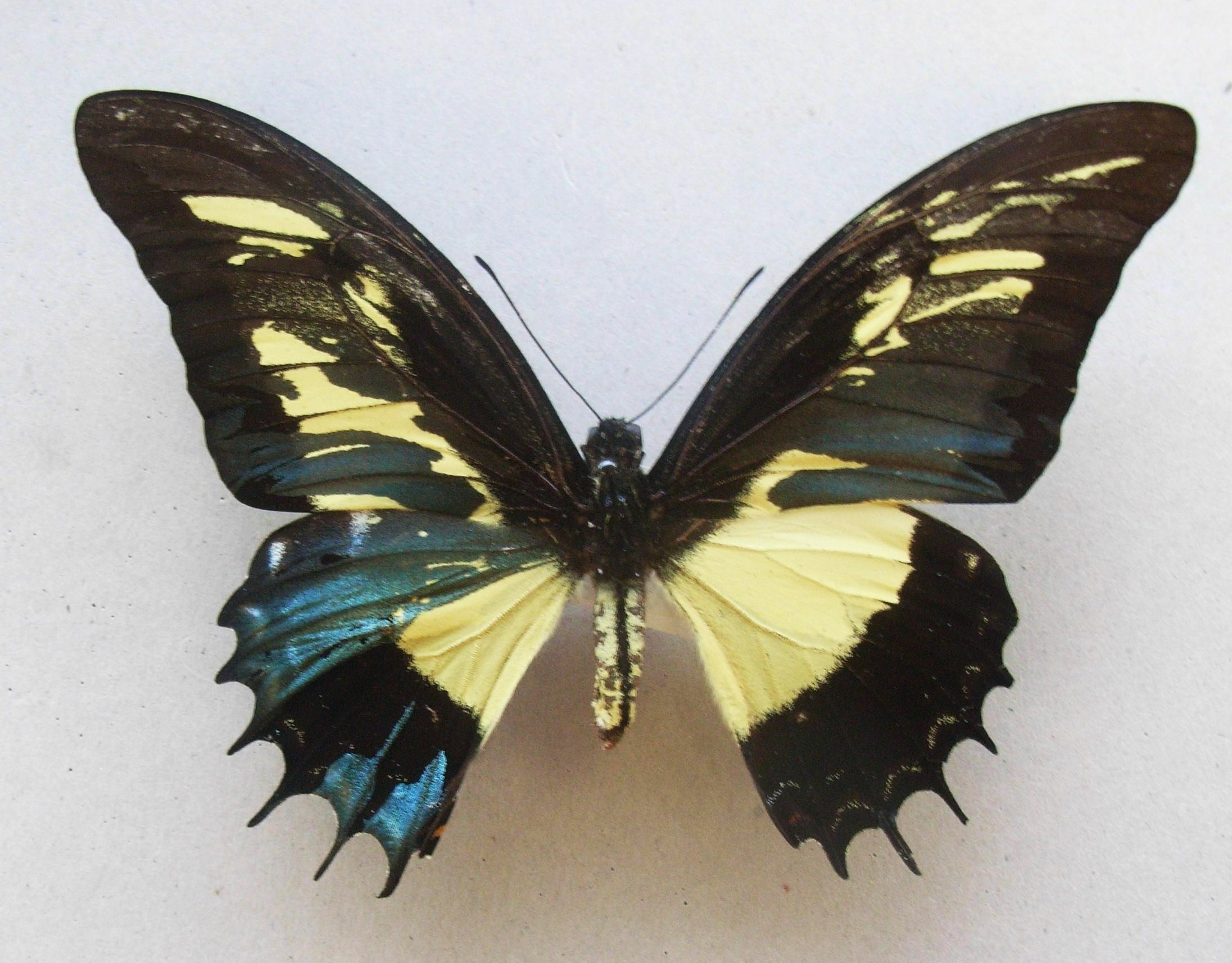
Mosaic gynandromorph of Papilio androgeus

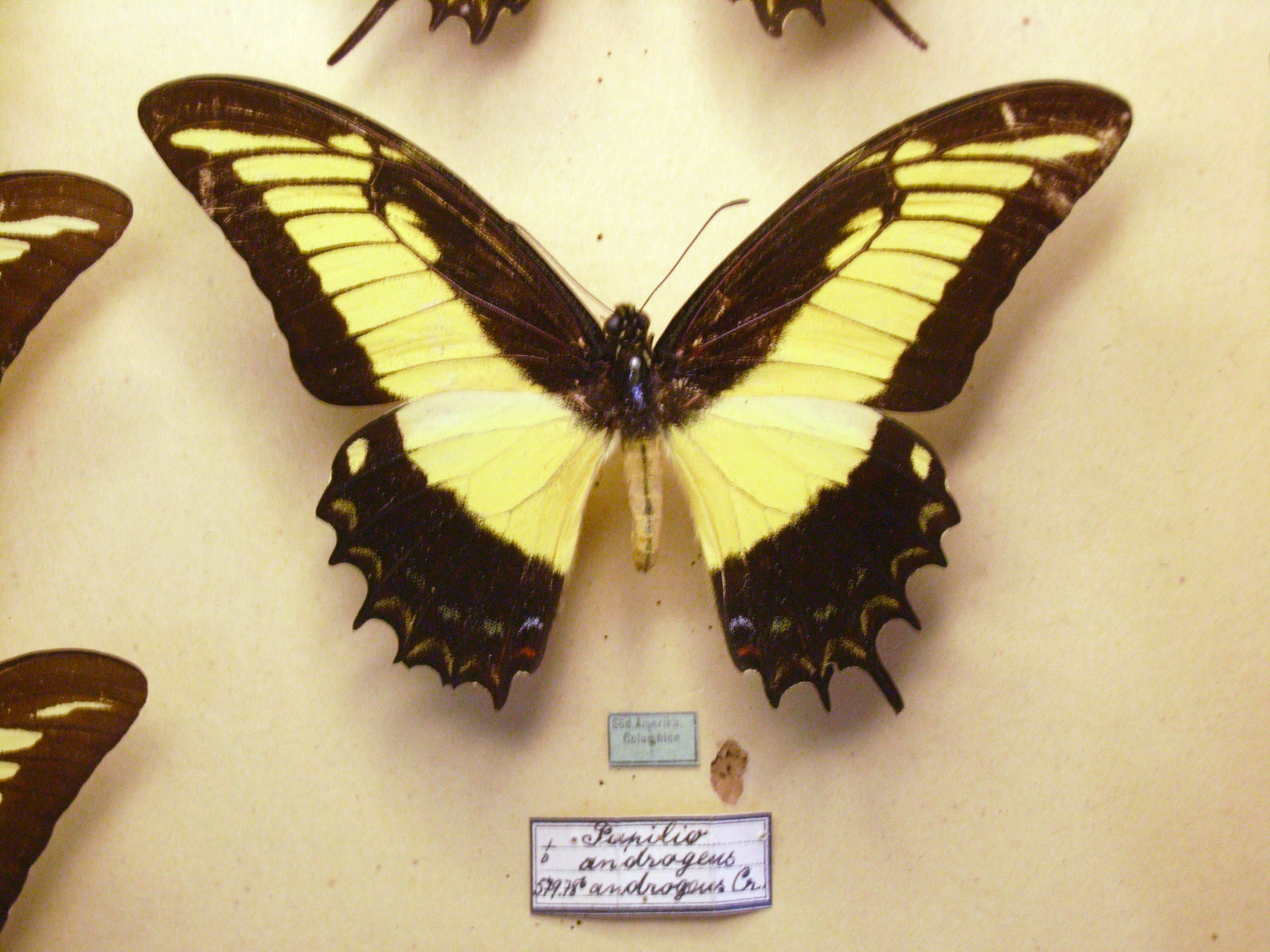
Normal male of Papilio androgeus

A notable example in birds is the zebra finch. These birds have lateralized brain structures in the face of a common steroid signal, providing strong evidence for a non-hormonal primary sex mechanism regulating brain differentiation.

== Causes ==
The exact cause for gynandromorphism is unknown, and appears to vary by species. One proposed cause for the phenotype in birds is a disruption that occurs in meiosis in female birds—who possess ZW chromosomes—in which polar bodies are not forced out of the cell. This is then followed with fertilization by two Z-bearing sperm cells that creates cells in the embryo containing both ZZ and ZW chromosomes. This appears to be the case noted above for the bobolink (Dolichonyx oryzivorus) as observed during 2026. The same phenomenon may be seen in other species, such as Drosophila melanogaster, and creates a genetic mosaic which gives rise to the mixed phenotype.

== As a research tool ==
Gynandromorphs occasionally afford a powerful tool in genetic, developmental, and behavioral analyses. In Drosophila melanogaster, for instance, they provided evidence that male courtship behavior originates in the brain, that males can distinguish conspecific females from males by the scent or some other characteristic of the posterior, dorsal, integument of females, that the germ cells originate in the posterior-most region of the blastoderm, and that somatic components of the gonads originate in the mesodermal region of the fourth and fifth abdominal segment.

== See also ==
- Androgyny
- Chimerism
- Gynomorph
- Half-sider budgerigar
- Hermaphrodite
- Mosaicism
