= Genetic chimerism in fiction =

Human genetic chimerism, which can not only cause a wide range of illnesses but also lead to the same person having more than one profile in genetic fingerprinting, has served as a plot device in many works of fiction. Most known examples are subsequent to the 2004 book Free Culture, where author Lawrence Lessig digresses briefly to describe chimerism and suggest that it could, and had yet to, be well used as a television plot device (particularly for police procedurals involving genetic fingerprinting).

- In Kathy Reichs' novel Spider Bones, after an incorrect identification of a deceased Vietnam soldier, Dr. Brennan discovers that his mother was a chimera, explaining why their DNA did not match.
- The CSI: Crime Scene Investigation episode "Bloodlines" involves a man who rapes a woman and is identified by her, but the DNA from his semen doesn't match to the DNA from his saliva because he is a chimera.
- In the House episode "Cane and Able", a boy who believes he was abducted by aliens is diagnosed with chimerism.
- In an episode of The Office, Dwight Schrute says that he resorbed his twin brother while in his mother's womb. He also says that he now has "the strength of a grown man and a little baby".
- A November 2006 episode of the ABC soap opera All My Children revealed that the testing of a young character's DNA did not turn up a match with her mother, Annie, because the character of Annie is a chimera.
- One of the subplots in Michael Crichton's 2006 novel Next deals with chimerism.
- In season three of the TV series ReGenesis, a girl accused of murder is found not guilty when DNA from her blood does not match the DNA found on the victim. She is later proven to be the killer when DNA from her saliva is shown to match that at the scene of the crime. The discrepancy between her blood and saliva is explained by her being a chimera.
- In an episode of the medical comedy drama TV series Best Medicine, based on Doc Martin, Elaine Denton (played by Cree)'s mother tells her that she "ate" her twin sister when she was in her womb.
- In the PlayStation 3 games Resistance: Fall of Man and its sequels Resistance 2 and Resistance 3, by Insomniac Games, the monsters were referred to as Chimera due to their combination of human and alien DNA.
- A March 2008 Radio Lab episode explored the case of a human chimera.
- In the 30 Rock episode "MILF Island", the character Liz Lemon says that she used to have deformed baby foot which was thought to be the result of her eating her twin while her mother, Margaret Lemon, was pregnant.
- In the Stephen King novel The Dark Half, Thad Beaumont, the main character, suffers from intense migraine headaches as a child. When on the operating table, his doctors find a human eye, ear and part of a nose growing inside Thad's skull, which was the cause of his headaches. The doctors explained this as Thad having absorbed his twin prior to birth.
- In the TV series Dark Angel, the chimera theme was used with the main character, Max, having feline DNA.
- The 1991 Anglia TV (UK) drama Chimera centered on the creation/consequences of a human/ape chimera.
- Chimeras appear frequently in the Thursday Next science fiction novels written by Jasper Fforde. They are the result of home genetic engineering kits.
- Vonda McIntyre's novella Screwtop (1976) features a genetically engineered "tetraparental" (four parents) character who has black-and-fair streaked skin, as well as black-and-blond streaked hair.
- In Mother 3, chimerism is one of main themes, with chimeric animals being introduced early on in the game. The first chimera shown is a mechanized Drago that was changed from a kind creature to a wild and powerful chimera that kills the protagonist's mother. Different chimeras appear throughout the game's plot, usually as enemies created and controlled by the Pigmask army. They appear aggressive and unable to control themselves, but some major to the plot chimeras have shown regret and sadness.
- In the novel A Discovery of Witches, the protagonist Diana Bishop discovers she is a chimera, which serves as a potential explanation for why she may be capable of conceiving a child with a vampire, who are assumed to be infertile.
- The Chimera Ant arc of the anime/manga series Hunter x Hunter features a namesake species that reproduces by consuming something of a different species, creating an offspring that has characteristics of both species. The action in this storyline comes from the fact that Chimera Ants have begun consuming humans, creating offspring that are much more powerful than anything seen before.
- Orphan Black is a Canadian science fiction television series revolving around the main character, Sarah Manning, as she discovers the existence of several of her genetic clones. It is revealed in the ninth episode of the third season, "Insolvent Phantom of Tomorrow", that the original source of the genetic material for both the female clones and male clones featured in the series are from a chimera, Kendall Malone, who absorbed her twin brother while in the womb, thus containing both male and female DNA.
- In Teen Wolf season 5, some teenagers having undergone transplants are modified into genetic chimeras by pseudoscientists the Dread Doctors. One of the teenagers, Mason, is reportedly a chimaera due to having absorbed his twin in utero.
- In Pokémon Sun and Moon one of the creatures introduced, Type: Null, is a chimera.
- In the video game No Straight Roads, the character Eve (real name Nadia) has different colored skin with half of her face showing a darker pink tone (with freckles) and the other a whiter, fair tone. She at first tries to conceal this with make-up, but eventually develops a whole image based on this duality.
