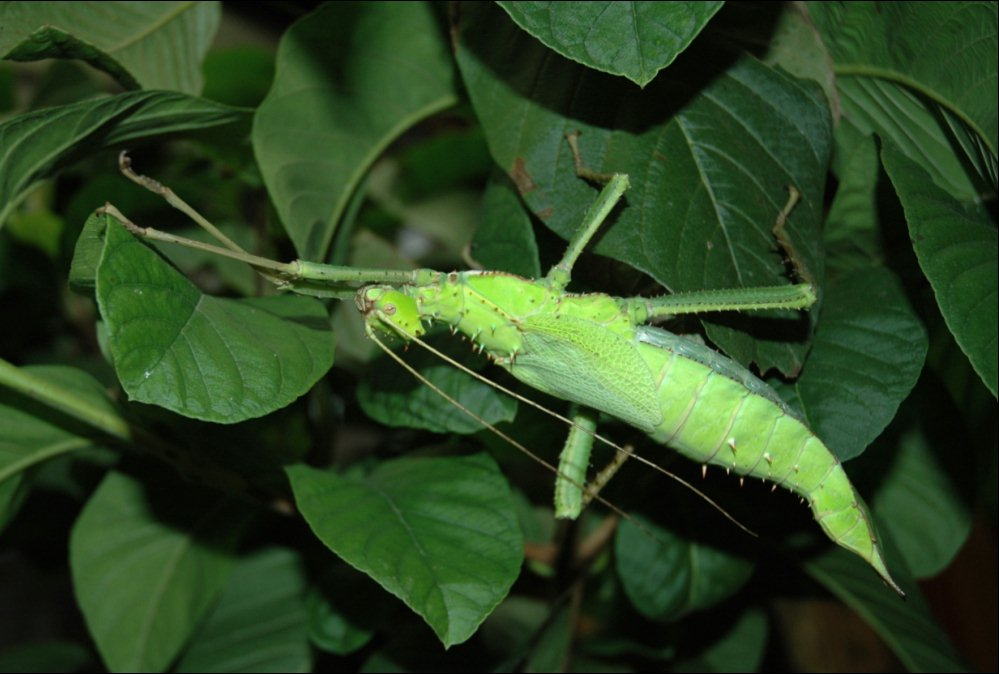
- Female of Heteropteryx dilatata

Scientific classification
- Kingdom: Animalia
- Phylum: Arthropoda
- Clade: Pancrustacea
- Class: Insecta
- Order: Phasmatodea
- Family: Heteropterygidae
- Subfamily: Heteropteryginae
- Tribe: Heteropterygini
- Genus: Heteropteryx; Gray, 1835
- Species: H. dilatata

Binomial name
- Heteropteryx dilatata (Parkinson, 1798)

Synonyms
- Genus synonym: Leocrates Stål, 1875; Species synonym List: Phasma dilatatum Parkinson, 1798; Cyphocrania graciosa (Westwood, 1848); Diapherodes dilatatus (Parkinson, 1798); Haaniella castelnaudi (Westwood, 1874); Heteropteryx rollandi Lucas, 1882; Heteropteryx castelnaudi Westwood, 1874; Heteropteryx hopei Westwood, 1864; Leocrates castelnaudi (Westwood, 1874); Leocrates dilatatum (Parkinson, 1798); Leocrates graciosa (Westwood, 1848); Phasma graciosa Westwood, 1848

= Heteropteryx =

Monotypic genus of stick insect

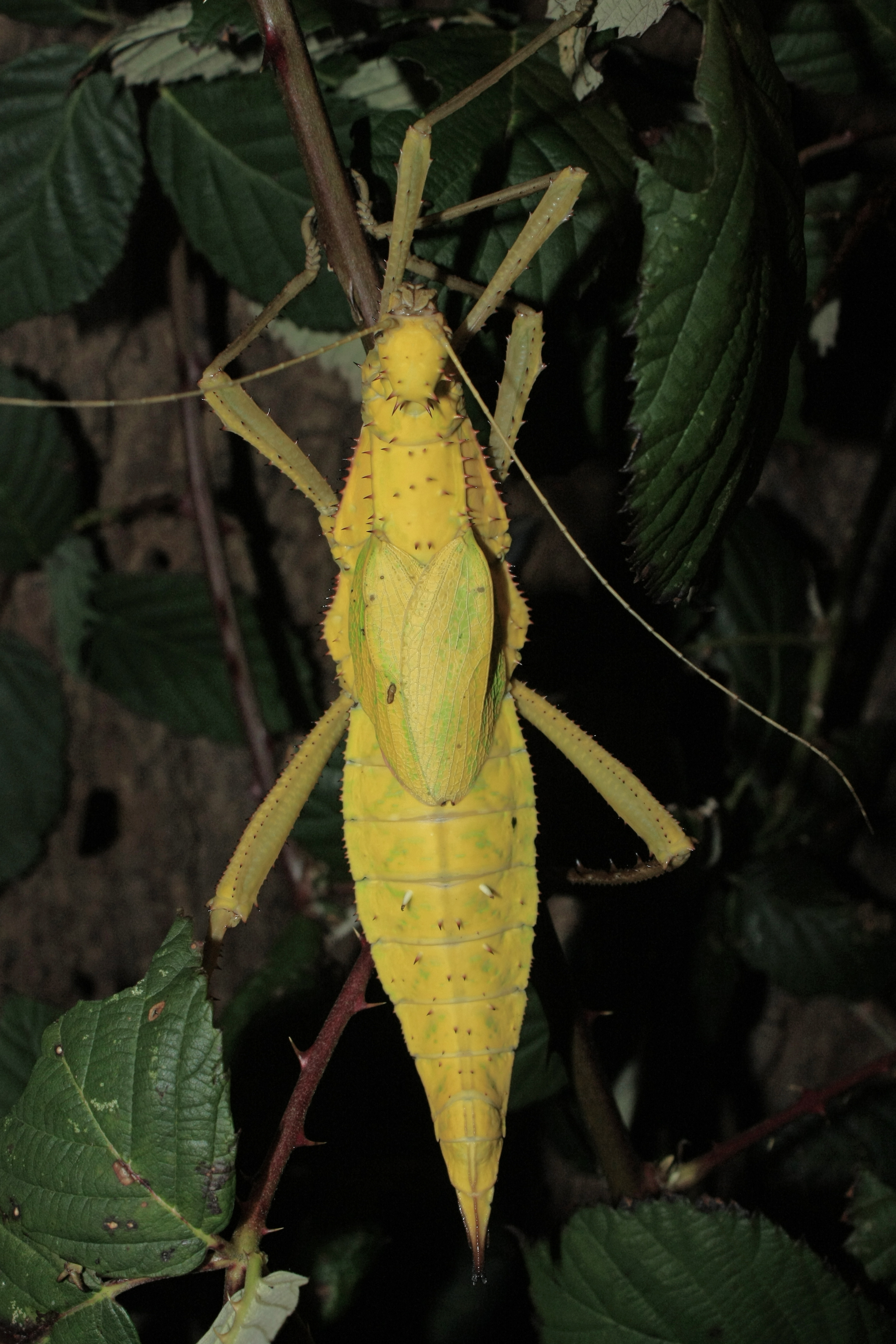
Yellow female of Heteropteryx dilatata

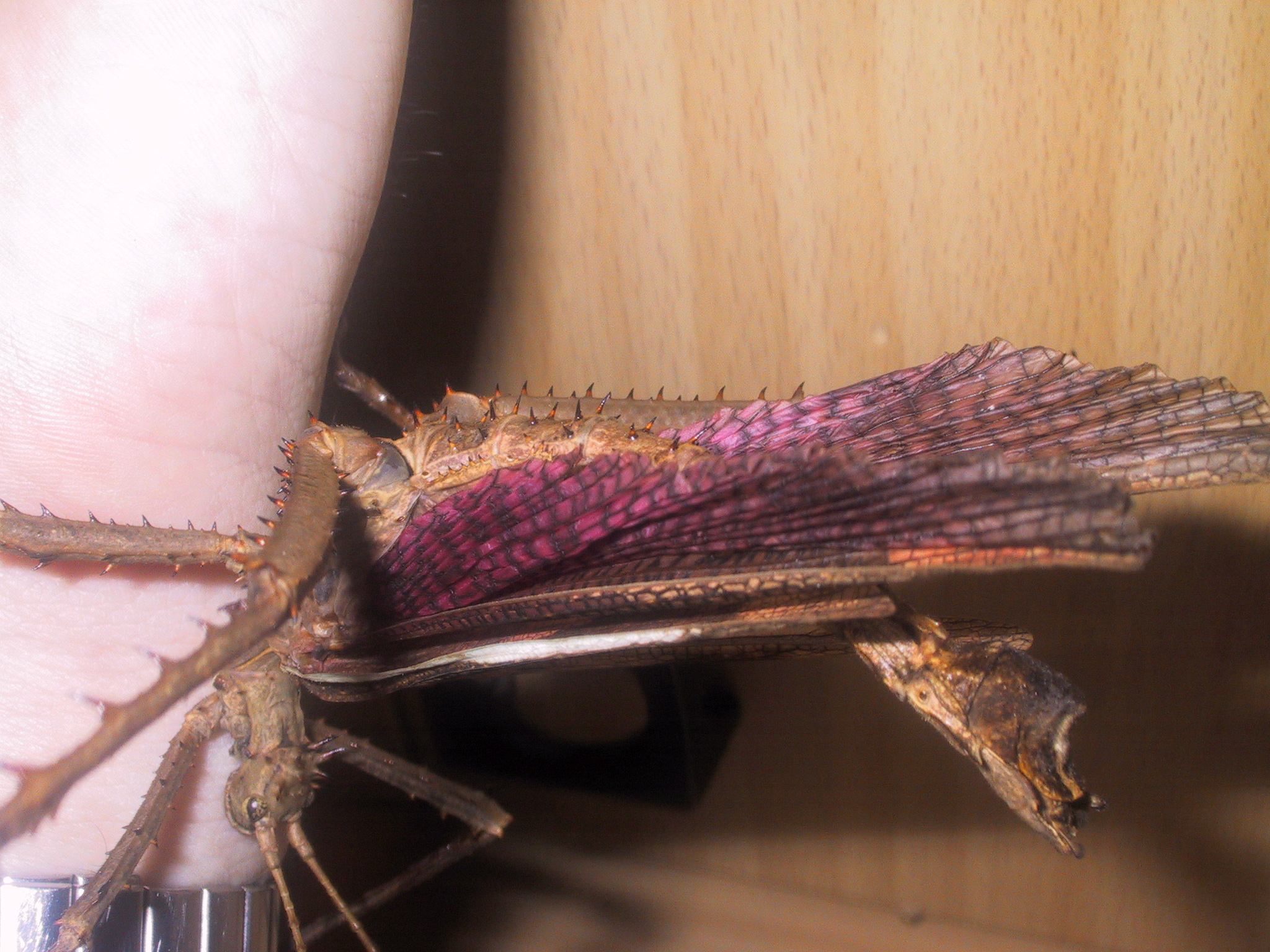
Threatening male of Heteropteryx dilatata

Heteropteryx is a monotypic genus of stick insects containing Heteropteryx dilatata as the only described species. and gives its name to the family of the Heteropterygidae. Their only species may be known as jungle nymph, Malaysian stick insect, Malayan jungle nymph, or Malayan wood nymph and because of their size it is commonly kept in zoological institutions and private terrariums of insect lovers. It originates from the Malay Archipelago and is nocturnal.

== Description ==
The females are much larger and wider than the males, reaching 14 centimetres (5.5 in) to 17 centimetres (6.7 in) in length and 30 to 65 g in weight, making them among the heaviest phasmids and extant insects. In addition to the typically lime green-colored females, there are also yellow and even more rarely red-brown females. Their two pairs of wings are both shortened. At rest, the green forewings, formed as tegmina, cover the somewhat shorter, strikingly pink-colored membranous hind wings, here formed as alae, however they are incapable of flight. The head, body and legs are thorny. The flattened body is provided with a number of spines, in particular along the body edges including the abdomen and the legs, and especially along the hind legs. At the end of the abdomen there is a secondary ovipositor for laying the eggs in the ground. It surrounds the actual ovipositor and is ventral formed from the eighth sternite, here named subgenital plate or operculum and dorsally from the eleventh tergum, which is referred to here as the supraanal plate or epiproct.

The much smaller males are slender and only about 9 centimetres (3.5 in) to 13 centimetres (5.1 in) long. They have spines all over their body and legs like the females, and are usually a mottled brown colour. The hind wings cover the entire abdomen. The narrow, but only slightly shorter forewings are designed as tegmina to and have a light front edge, which gives the animals with closed wings the typical lateral stripes over the mesonotum and half of the abdomen. The fully developed hind wings are reddish and marked with a brown net pattern.

== Distribution area and lifestyle ==
Heteropteryx dilatata comes from the Malay Archipelago. There it was found on the Malay Peninsula, in Thailand, Singapore, as well as on Sumatra and in Sarawak on Borneo. It is unclear whether the animals documented on Madagascar belong to an indigenous population.

Both sexes are capable of defensive stridulation when there is danger. The colored rear wings are jerked open again and again. In addition, the animals then threaten, similar to the representatives of the closely related genus Haaniella, with raised abdomen and the attacker stretched, splayed hind legs. Upon contact, the legs snap together as a scissor-like weapon. When touched, the tibiae of the hind legs are then quickly struck against the femura, which creates an effective defense through its spines, in particular those on the tibiae.

== Reproduction ==
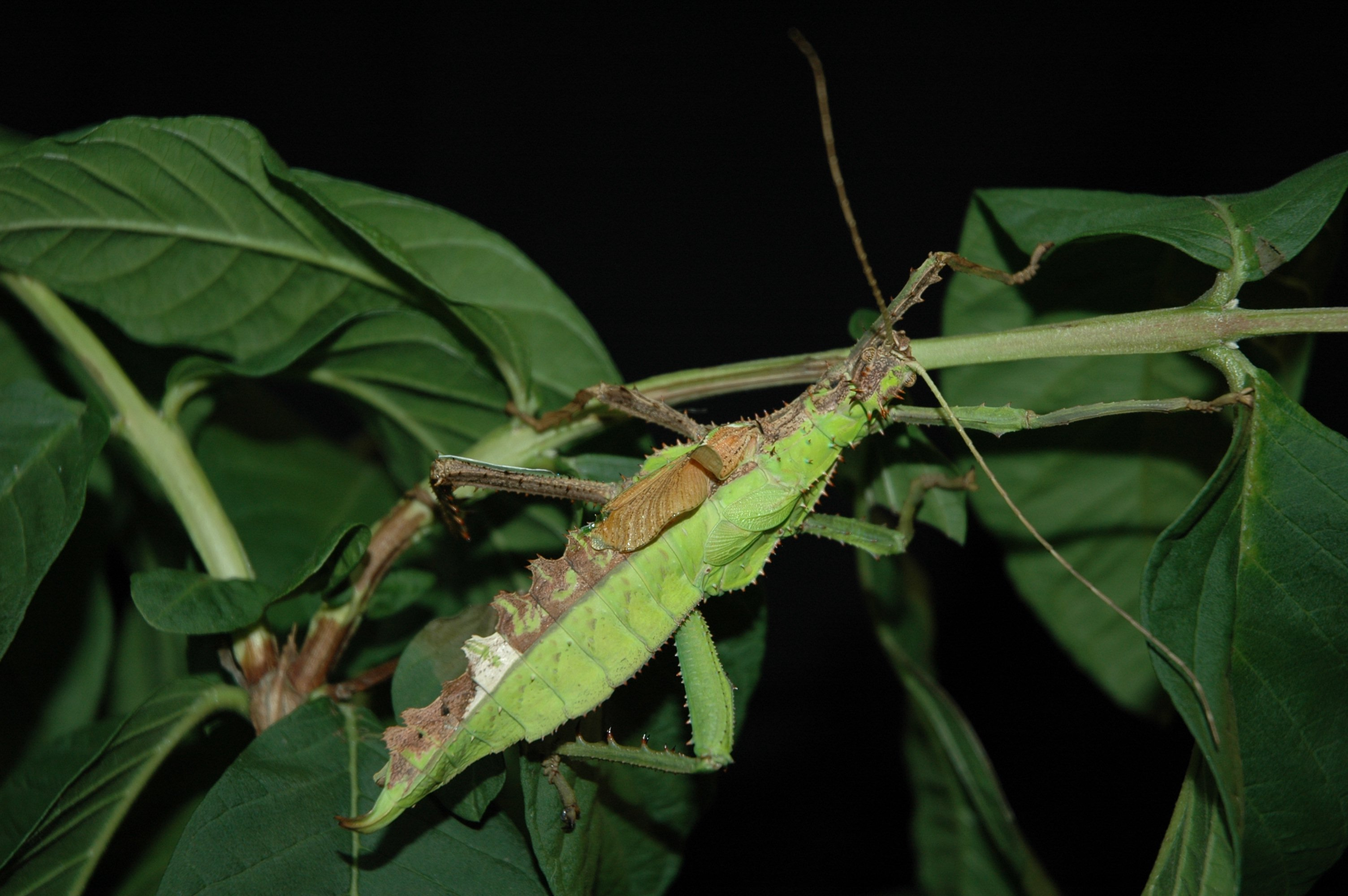
Gynandromorph

- - Haaniella saussurei
  - - - Haaniella spp.
      - - Haaniella erringtoniae
        - - Heteropteryx sp. 'Khao Lak'
          - Heteropteryx dilatata
            = Heteropteryx dilatata 'Kuala Boh'
    - Haaniella spp.

Position of the Heteropteryx representatives within the previously genetic analysis investigated Heteropteryginae species according to Sarah Bank et al. (2021)

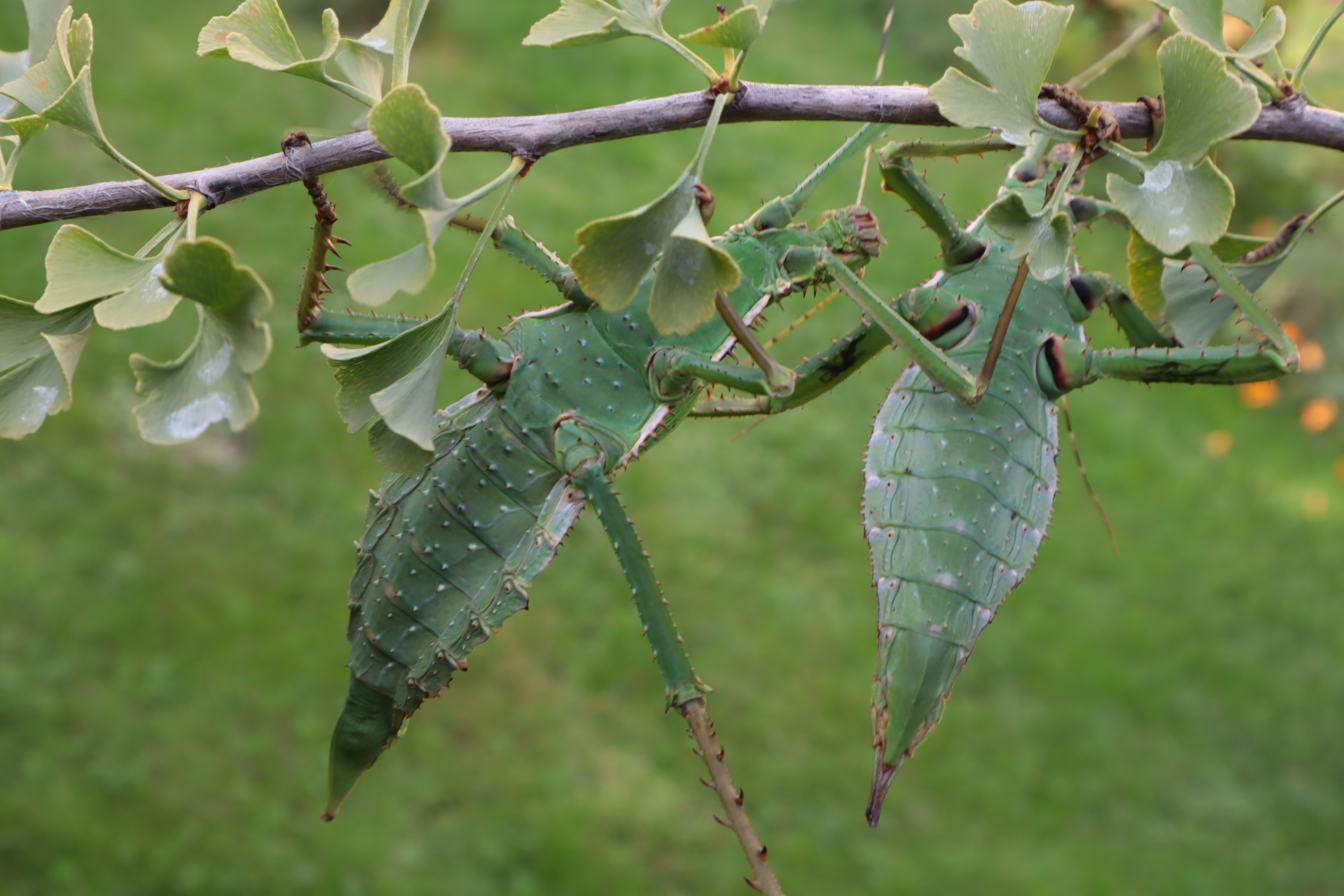
Left adult Heteropteryx dilatata female from Kuala Boh, right female L5 nymph of the undescribed species with black coxes from Khao Lak

It is a common misconception that Heteropteryx dilatata holds the record for the largest egg laid by an insect, with the eggs sometimes described as being 1.3 centimetres (0.51 in) in length. The heaviest eggs are 250 to 300 mg laid by the closely related Haaniella echinata. These are up to 1.2 centimetres (0.47 in) long and about 0.8 centimetres (0.31 in) wide. The females of Asceles malaccae, which are just under 10 centimetres (3.9 in) long, lay eggs that are up to 1.5 centimetres (0.59 in) long, but only about 0.2 centimetres (0.079 in) in diameter. The eggs of Heteropteryx dilatata are 0.7 centimetres (0.28 in) to 0.8 centimetres (0.31 in) long, 0.5 centimetres (0.20 in) wide and about 70 mg in weight. The females lay these individually in the ground with their ovipositor. After about 7 to 14 months the nymphs hatch. These are able to change their lighter color during the day to a darker one at night and form sleeping communities up to the fourth larval stage, in which the insects clump or chain to one another on the food plants. The nymphs are generally beige in color when they hatch. While the color of the males becomes a little darker with each moult, the females change from beige to green after the third moult. About a year after hatching, the molting to imago takes place, which is the fifth molting in the males and the sixth molting in the females. The imago then live for about 6 to 24 months. As with many other phasmid species, Gynander also occasionally occur in Heteropteryx dilatata. These are often designed as half-sided hermaphrodites.

== Taxonomy ==
Heteropteryx dilatata is the only described representative of the genus Heteropteryx established by George Robert Gray in 1835 and was described in 1798 by John Parkinson as Phasma dilatatum. The holotype is a female deposited in the collection of the Macleay Museum of the University of Sydney. All other species described in the genus Heteropteryx, like Heteropteryx dehaanii, Heteropteryx echinata, Heteropteryx erringtoniae, Heteropteryx grayii, Heteropteryx muelleri, Heteropteryx rosenbergii and Heteropteryx scabra are assigned to Haaniella, or have turned out to be synonyms of Heteropteryx dilatata like Heteropteryx castelnaudi, Heteropteryx hopei and Heteropteryx rollandi. The generic name Leocrates introduced by Carl Stål in 1875 for Leocrates graciosa and used for Leocrates glaber and Leocrates mecheli by Josef Redtenbacher 1906 is synonymous with Heteropteryx. The two species described by Redtenbacher have been valid species of the genus Haaniella again since 2016.

In their investigations based on genetic analysis to clarify the phylogeny of the Heteropterygidae, Sarah Bank et al showed that the representatives of the Heteropterigini form a common clade, but the genus Heteropteryx phylogenetically is to be placed in the middle of several lines of species currently listed in Haaniella. It could also be shown that in addition to the Malay Heteropteryx dilatata there is another species from the Thai Phang Nga Province, more precisely from the Khao Lak–Lam Ru National Park.

== Terraristic ==
The species was founded in 1974 by C.C. Chua from the Cameron Highlands in Pahang near the border to Perak and imported several times from Perak to Europe by various traders in the 1980s. Other stocks have been introduced from this region in the recent past and are kept with their origin being named. One stock from Tapah Hills (also Perak near Pahang) and in 2015 another from Yoko Matsumura from Kuala Boh in Pahang were bred. A breeding stock imported from Phuket in 1998, in which the females have black coxae, has been lost. The fact that this corresponds to the one used by Bank et al. the undescribed species identified in 2021 is considered likely, as the two sites are only about one hundred kilometers apart and the specimens examined by molecular genetics also have black coxes.

The size of the terrarium had to be adapted to the number of animals. For a couple, the terrarium should not be smaller than 40 × 40 × 40 centimetres (16 in). The feed branches with leaves can be placed in a narrow-necked vase so that they stay fresh longer. Among other leaves, those of bramble are eaten, such as blackberry and raspberry, but also oak, hazel and ivy. Temperatures between 20 °C (68 °F) and 30 °C (86 °F) and high humidity are required for keeping them. The latter is achieved by spraying the forage plants with water. In order to enable the females to lay their eggs, the ground should be covered several centimeters thick with substrate. Alternatively, an egg-laying vessel with substrate can be offered. Heteropteryx dilatata can live up to two years of age in captivity.

== Gallery ==
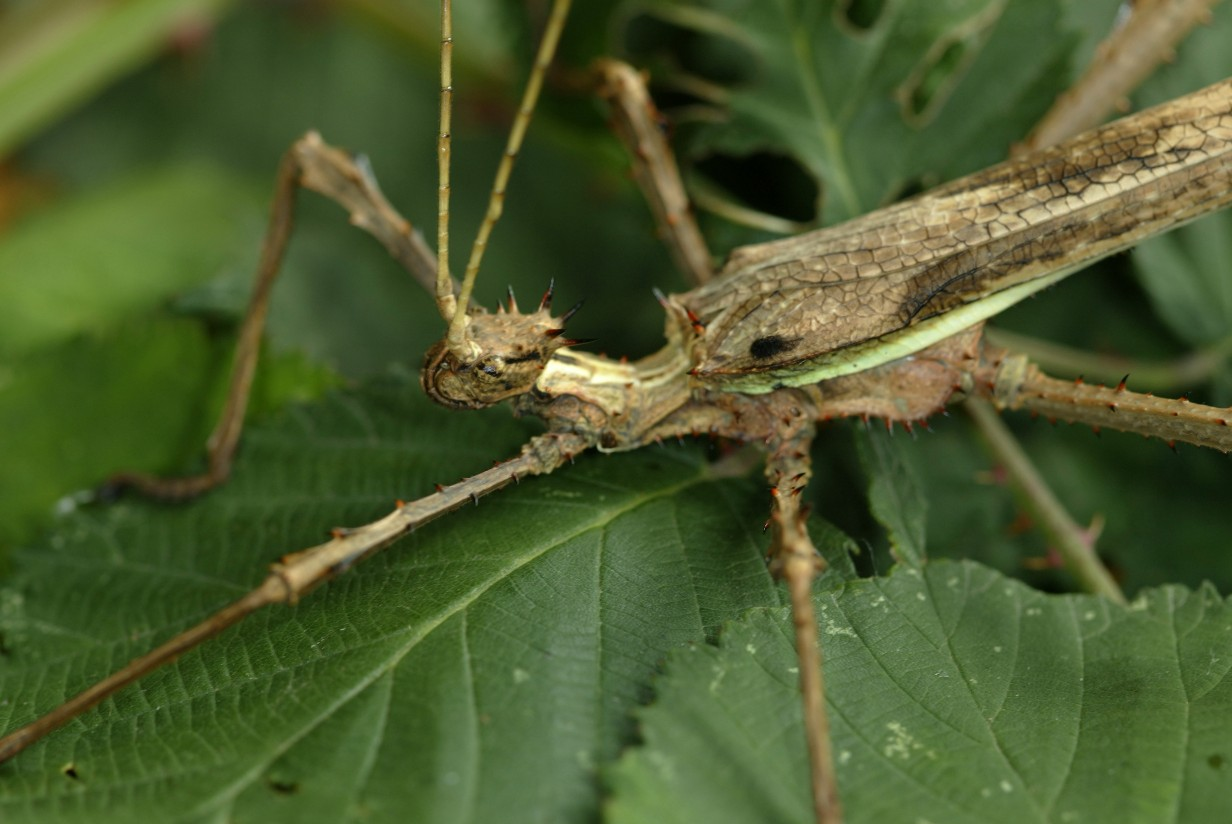
Adult male

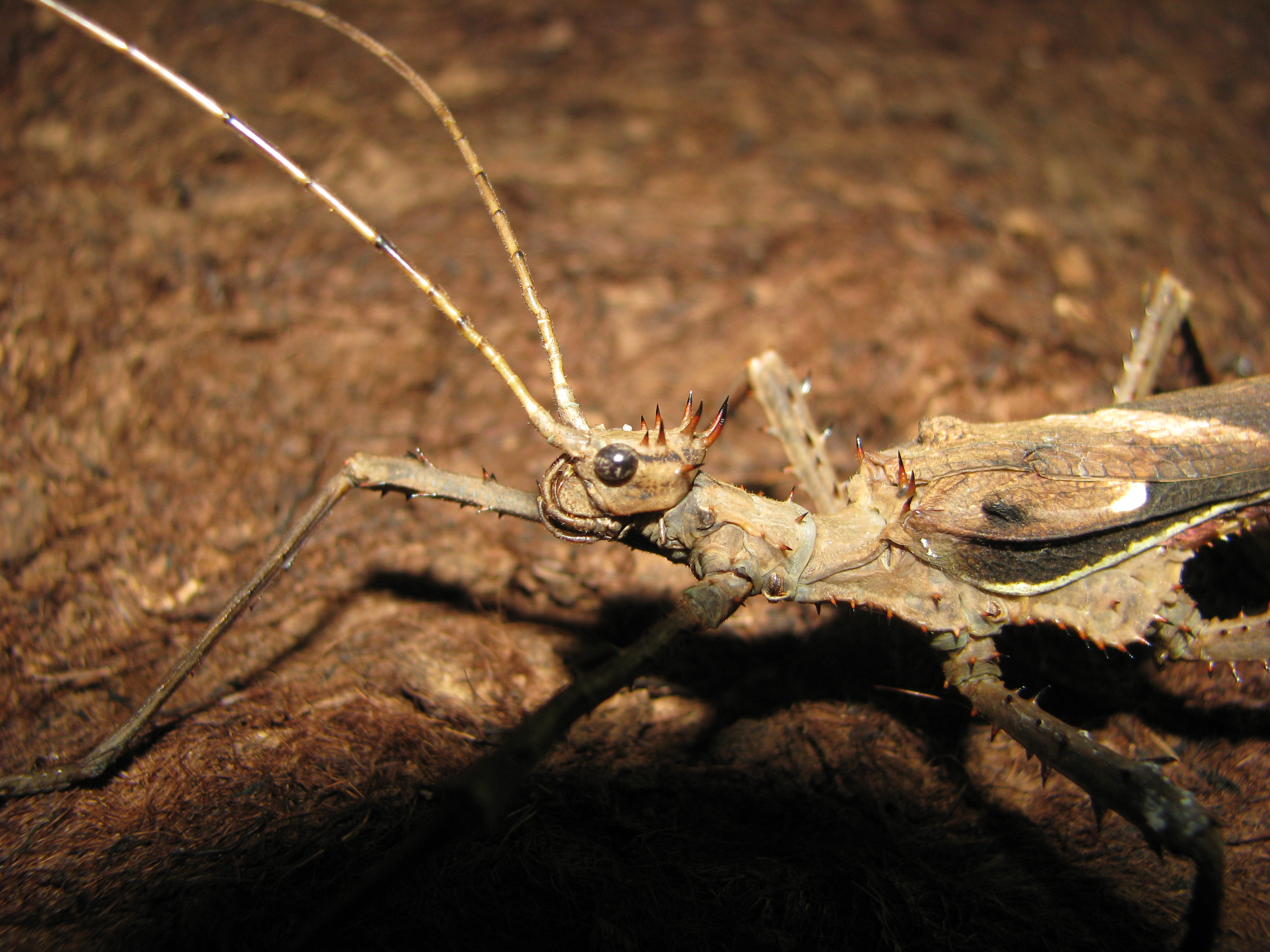
Portrait of a male

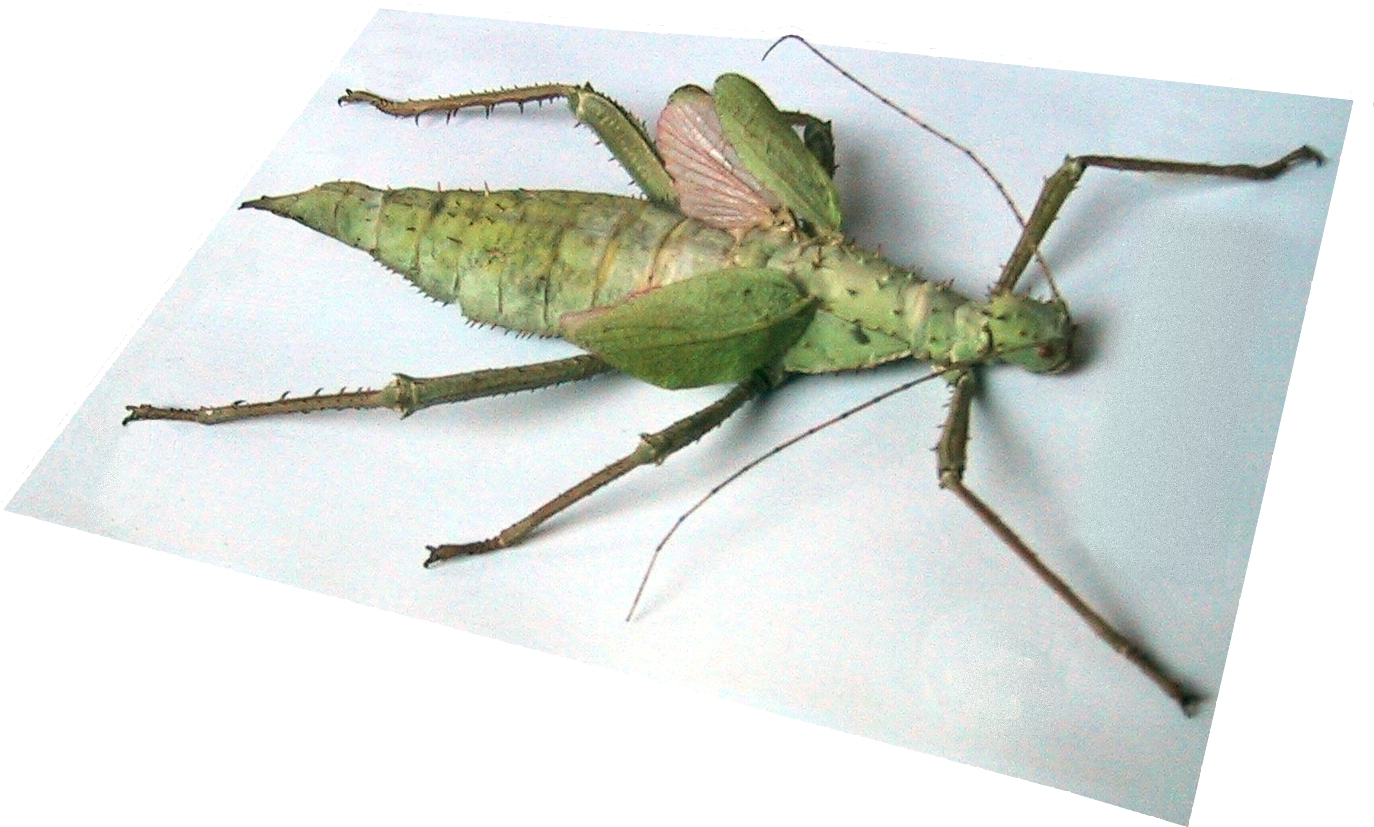
Adult female

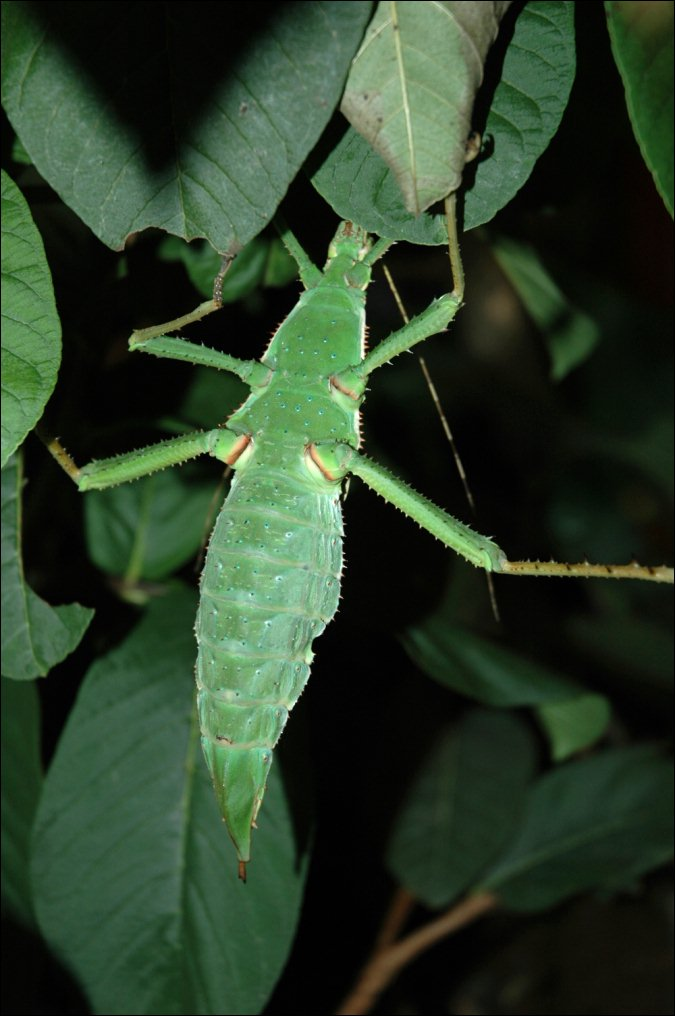
Female from ventral

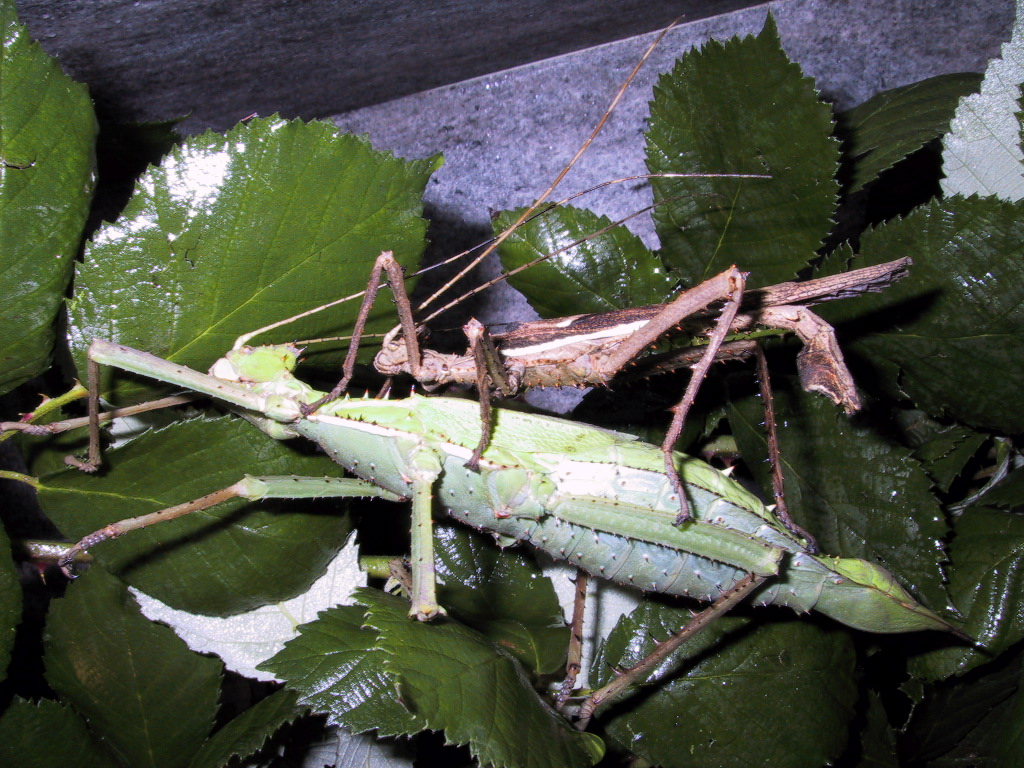
Adult pair; the smaller male on top of the female

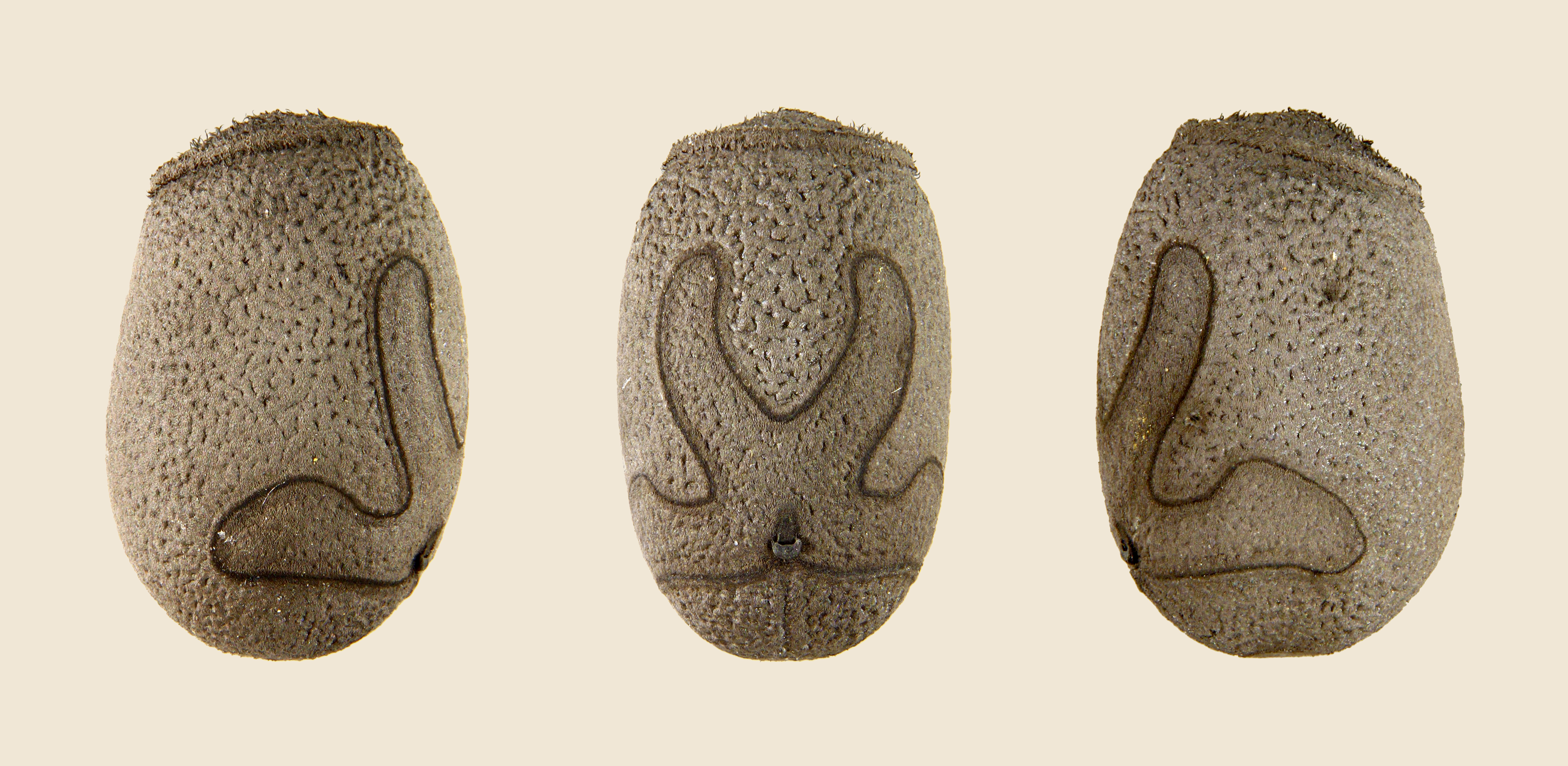
Eggs

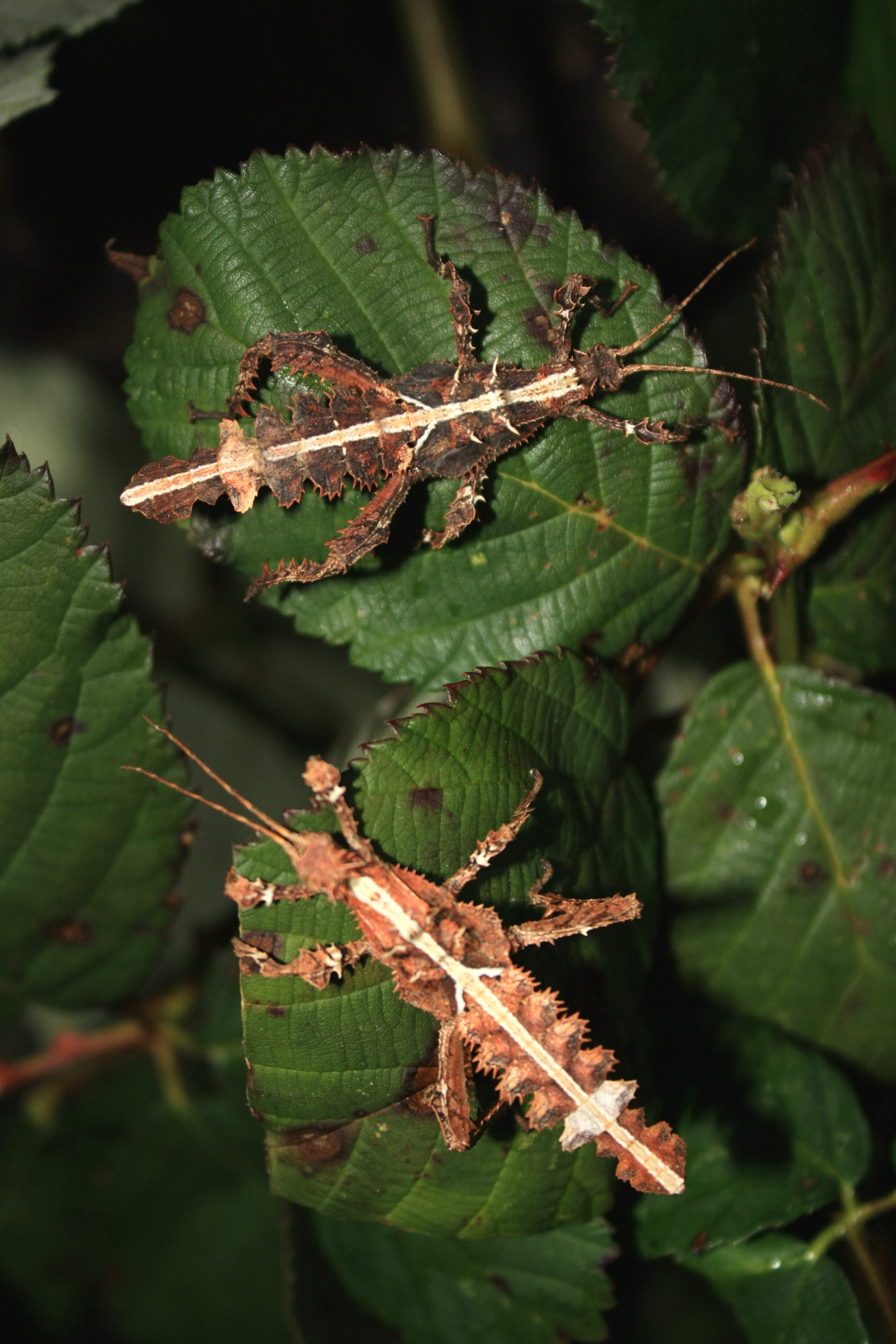
Two male nymphs (L3)
