= Chimera (genetics) =

Organism composed of cells of different genotypes

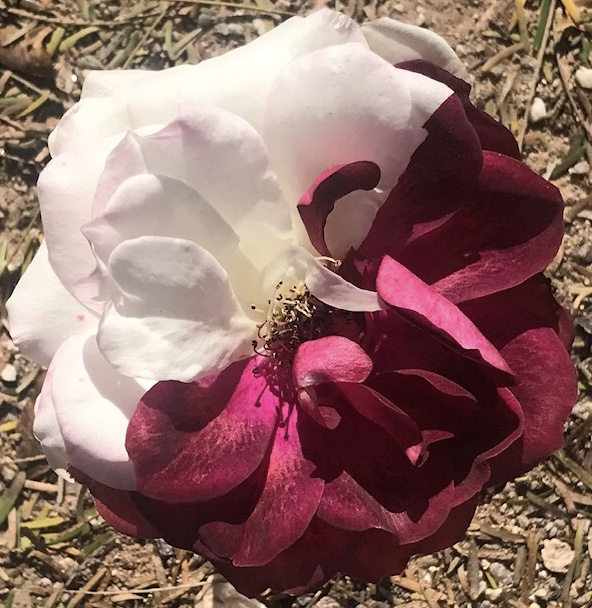
Two-colored rose chimera

A genetic chimerism or chimera (en-US), also chimaerism or chimaera (en-UK), (/kaɪˈmɪərə, kɪ-/ ky-MEER-ə, kih-) is a single organism composed of cells of different genotypes. Animal chimeras can be produced by the fusion of two (or more) embryos. In plants and some animal chimeras, mosaicism involves distinct types of tissue that originated from the same zygote, but differ due to mutation during ordinary cell division.

Normally, genetic chimerism is not visible on casual inspection; however, it has been detected in the course of proving parentage. More practically, in agronomy, "chimera" indicates a plant or portion of a plant whose tissues are made up of two or more types of cells with different genetic makeup; it can derive from a bud mutation or, more rarely, at the grafting point, from the concrescence of cells of the two bionts; in this case it is commonly referred to as a "graft hybrid", although it is not a hybrid in the genetic sense of "hybrid".

In contrast, an individual where each cell contains genetic material from two organisms of different breeds, varieties, species or genera is called a hybrid.

Another way that chimerism can occur in animals is by organ transplantation, giving one individual tissues that developed from a different genome. For example, transplantation of bone marrow often determines the recipient's ensuing blood type.

== Classifications ==
=== Natural chimerism ===
Some level of chimerism occurs naturally in the wild in many animal species, including rare cases of chimerism in humans, and in some cases may be a required (obligate) part of their life cycle.

==== In humans ====
Natural chimerism can occur in human fetuses when one embryo is formed from the fusing of two separate fertilised eggs during the earliest stages of pregnancy. Five of the most commonly occurring natural human chimeras are classified as cytomictical ("blood chimeras"), whole body, fetal-maternal, germ cell, and tumor chimeras. Cytomictical and whole body chimerism in humans are characterised by cells in the body demonstrating different DNA make-ups when tested. For some individuals, the different DNA make ups may change over the course of their lifetime. In both Cytomictical and whole body cases, there are often no visual indicators of this mixed DNA presence and chimerism is only detected after biological samples are tested, often in the course of diagnosing unrelated medical issues. Fetal-maternal chimerism in humans occurs when fetal cells continue to be present in the blood of formerly pregnant individuals for up to decades following pregnancy, or, conversely, when parental cells persist in the child's blood into adulthood. Germ cell chimerism is characterised by oocytes displaying XY bivalents, that is to say, individual oocytes which carry two distinct sets of chromosomal DNA. The final common human chimeric type is found in tumor chimeras, wherein a cancerous tumor displays two distinct sets of DNA, which may or may not be reflected in other chimeric properties of the affected human; such as tumors which occur in fetal-maternal chimeras carrying genetic material from both the parent and fetal DNA.

==== In marine sponges ====
Chimerism has been found in some species of marine sponges. Four distinct genotypes have been found in a single individual, and there is potential for even greater genetic heterogeneity. Each genotype functions independently in terms of reproduction, but the different intra-organism genotypes behave as a single large individual in terms of ecological responses like growth.

==== In obligates ====
It has been shown that male yellow crazy ants are obligate chimeras, the first known such case. In this species, the queens have arisen from fertilized eggs with a genotype of RR (Reproductive × Reproductive), the sterile female workers show a RW arrangement (Reproductive × Worker), and the males instead of being haploid, as is usually the case for ants, also display a RW genotype, but for them the egg R and the sperm W do not fuse so they develop as a chimera with some cells carrying an R and others carrying a W genome.

=== Artificial chimerism ===
Chimeric trait distribution by generation

Artificial chimerism refers to examples of chimerism that are produced by humans, either for research or commercial purposes.

==== Tetragametic chimerism ====
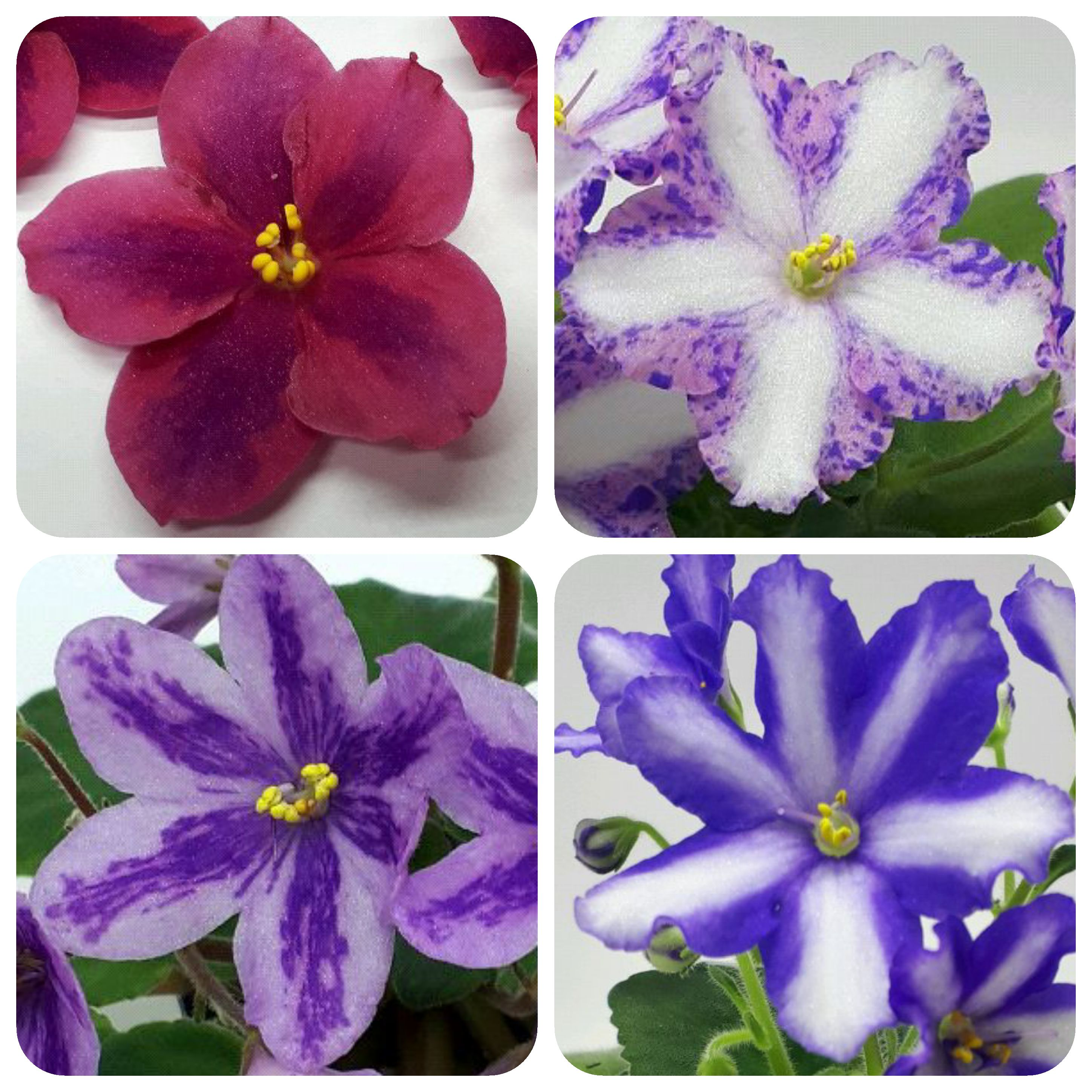
African violets exhibiting chimerism

Tetragametic chimerism is a form of congenital chimerism. This condition occurs through fertilizing two separate ova by two sperm, followed by aggregation of the two at the blastocyst or zygote stages. This results in the development of an organism with intermingled cell lines. Put another way, the chimera is formed from the merging of two nonidentical twins. As such, they can be male, female, or intersex.

The tetragametic state has important implications for organ or stem cell transplantation. Chimeras typically have immunologic tolerance to both cell lines.

==== Microchimerism ====
Microchimerism is the presence of a small number of cells that are genetically distinct from those of the host individual. Most people are born with a few cells genetically identical to their mothers' and the proportion of these cells goes down in healthy individuals as they get older. People who retain higher numbers of cells genetically identical to their mother's have been observed to have higher rates of some autoimmune diseases, presumably because the immune system is responsible for destroying these cells and a common immune defect prevents it from doing so and also causes autoimmune problems.

The higher rates of autoimmune diseases due to the presence of maternally derived cells is why in a 2010 study of a 40-year-old man with scleroderma-like disease (an autoimmune rheumatic disease), the female cells detected in his blood stream via FISH (fluorescence in situ hybridization) were thought to be maternally derived. However, his form of microchimerism was found to be due to a vanished twin, and it is unknown whether microchimerism from a vanished twin might predispose individuals to autoimmune diseases as well. Mothers often also have a few cells genetically identical to those of their children, and some people also have some cells genetically identical to those of their siblings (maternal siblings only, since these cells are passed to them because their mother retained them).

==== Germline chimerism ====
Germline chimerism occurs when the germ cells (for example, sperm and egg cells) of an organism are not genetically identical to its own. It has been recently discovered that marmosets can carry the reproductive cells of their (fraternal) twin siblings due to placental fusion during development. (Marmosets almost always give birth to fraternal twins.)

== Types ==
=== Animals ===
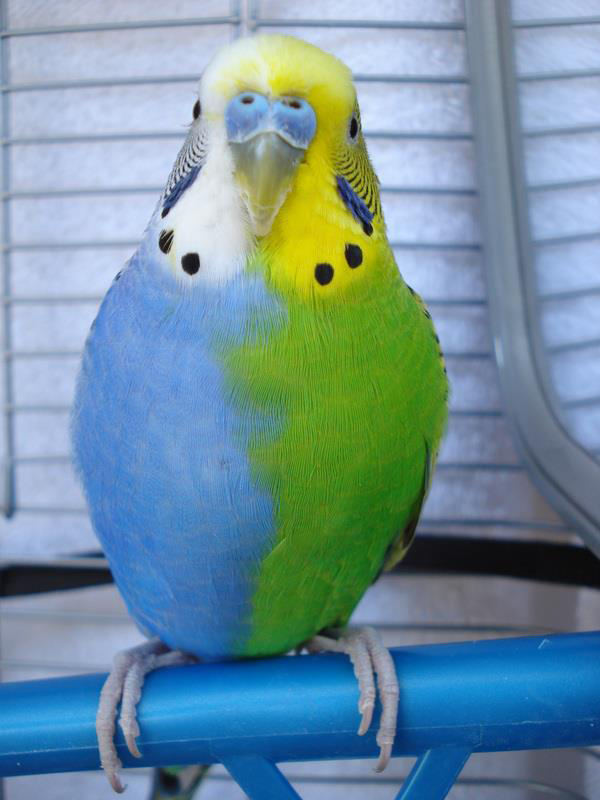
An example of a chimera half-sider budgerigar

As the organism develops, it can come to possess organs that have different sets of chromosomes. For example, the chimera may have a liver composed of cells with one set of chromosomes and have a kidney composed of cells with a second set of chromosomes. This has occurred in humans, and at one time was thought to be extremely rare although more recent evidence suggests that this is not the case.

This is particularly true for the marmoset. Recent research shows most marmosets are chimeras, sharing DNA with their fraternal twins. 95% of marmoset fraternal twins trade blood through chorionic fusions, making them hematopoietic chimeras.

In the budgerigar, due to the many existing plumage colour variations, tetragametic chimeras can be very conspicuous, as the resulting bird will have an obvious split between two colour types – often divided bilaterally down the centre. These individuals are known as half-sider budgerigars.

An animal chimera is a single organism that is composed of two or more different populations of genetically distinct cells that originated from different zygotes involved in sexual reproduction. If the different cells have emerged from the same zygote, the organism is called a mosaic. Innate chimeras are formed from at least four parent cells (two fertilised eggs or early embryos fused together). Each population of cells keeps its own character and the resulting organism is a mixture of tissues. Cases of human chimeras have been documented.

==== Chimerism in humans ====
Some consider mosaicism to be a form of chimerism, while others consider them to be distinct. Mosaicism involves a mutation of the genetic material in a cell, giving rise to a subset of cells that are different from the rest. Natural chimerism is the fusion of more than one fertilized zygote in the early stages of prenatal development. It is much rarer than mosaicism.

In artificial chimerism, an individual has one cell lineage that was inherited genetically at the time of the formation of the human embryo and the other that was introduced through a procedure, including organ transplantation or blood transfusion. Specific types of transplants that could induce this condition include bone marrow transplants and organ transplants, as the recipient's body essentially works to permanently incorporate the new blood stem cells into it.

Boklage argues that many human 'mosaic' cell lines will be "found to be chimeric if properly tested".

In contrast, a human where each cell contains human genetic material as well as that from another species would be a human–animal hybrid.

While German dermatologist Alfred Blaschko described Blaschko's lines in 1901, the genetic science took until the 1930s to approach a vocabulary for the phenomenon. The term genetic chimera has been used at least since the 1944 article of Belgovskii.

In nonidentical twins, innate chimerism occurs by means of blood vessel anastomoses. The likelihood of offspring being a chimera is increased if it is created via in vitro fertilisation. Chimeras can often breed, but the fertility and type of offspring depend on which cell line gave rise to the ovaries or testes; varying degrees of intersex differences may result if one set of cells is genetically female and another genetically male.

On 22 January 2019, the National Society of Genetic Counselors released an article Chimerism Explained: How One Person Can Unknowingly Have Two Sets of DNA, where they state, "where a twin pregnancy evolves into one child, is currently believed to be one of the rarer forms. However, we know that 20 to 30% of singleton pregnancies were originally a twin or a multiple pregnancy".

Most human chimeras will go through life without realizing they are chimeras. The difference in phenotypes may be subtle (e.g., having a hitchhiker's thumb and a straight thumb, eyes of slightly different colors, differential hair growth on opposite sides of the body, etc.) or completely undetectable. Chimeras may also show, under a certain spectrum of UV light, distinctive marks on the back resembling that of arrow points pointing downward from the shoulders down to the lower back; this is one expression of pigment unevenness called Blaschko's lines.

Another case was that of Karen Keegan, who was also suspected (initially) of not being her children's biological mother, after DNA tests on her adult sons for a kidney transplant she needed seemed to show that she was not their mother.

=== Plants ===
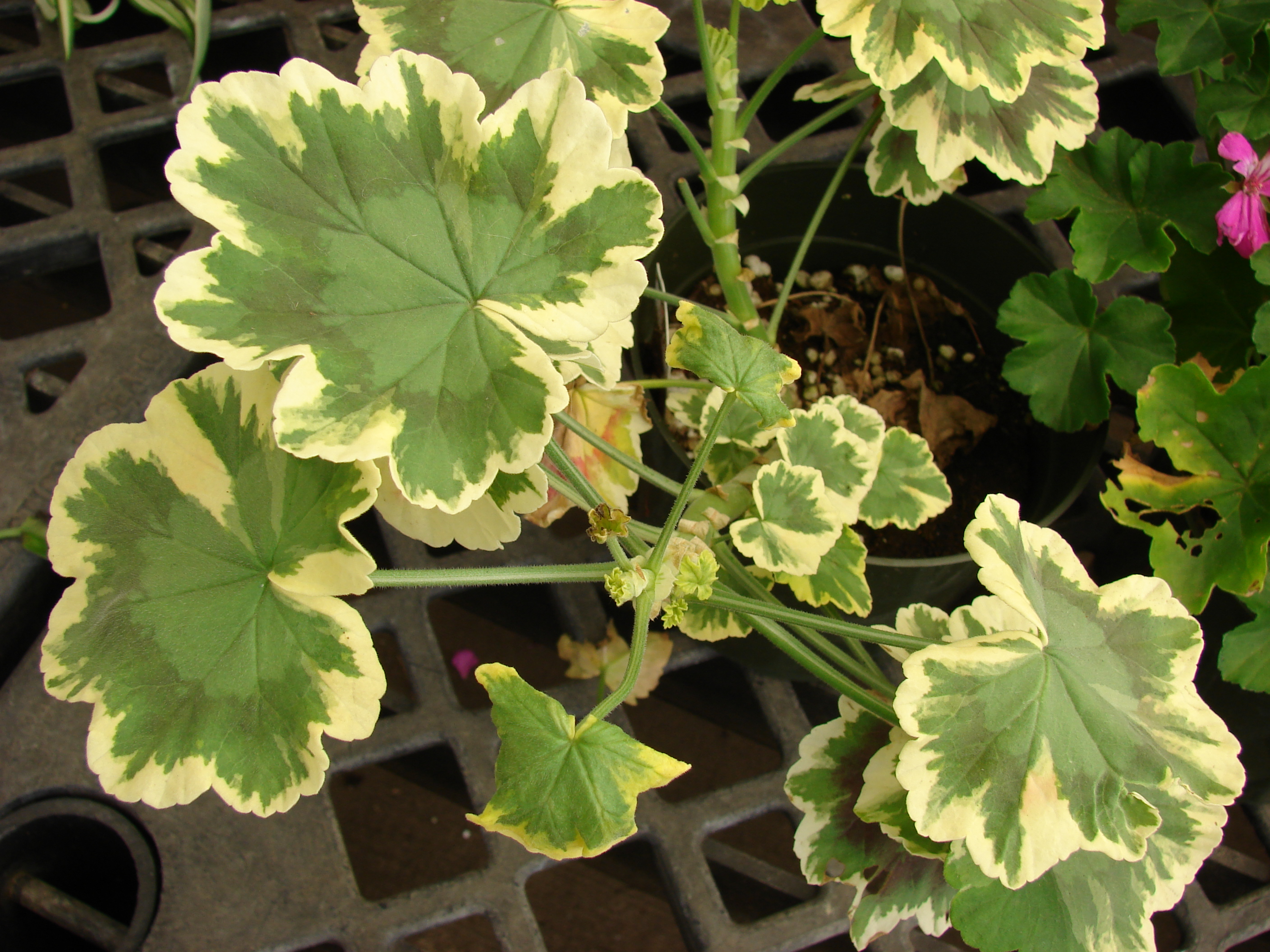
The green cells in the centres of the leaves of this Pelargonium plant have formed from the epithelium cell layer, which has normal chlorophyll. That cell layer does not extend all the way to the edges of the leaves, which therefore show the chlorophyll-deficient cells of other developmental layers. This is a periclinal chimera.

==== Structure ====
The distinction between sectorial, mericlinal and periclinal plant chimeras is widely used. Periclinal chimeras involve a genetic difference that persists in the descendant cells of a particular meristem layer. This type of chimera is more stable than mericlinal or sectoral mutations that affect only later generations of cells.

==== Graft chimeras ====
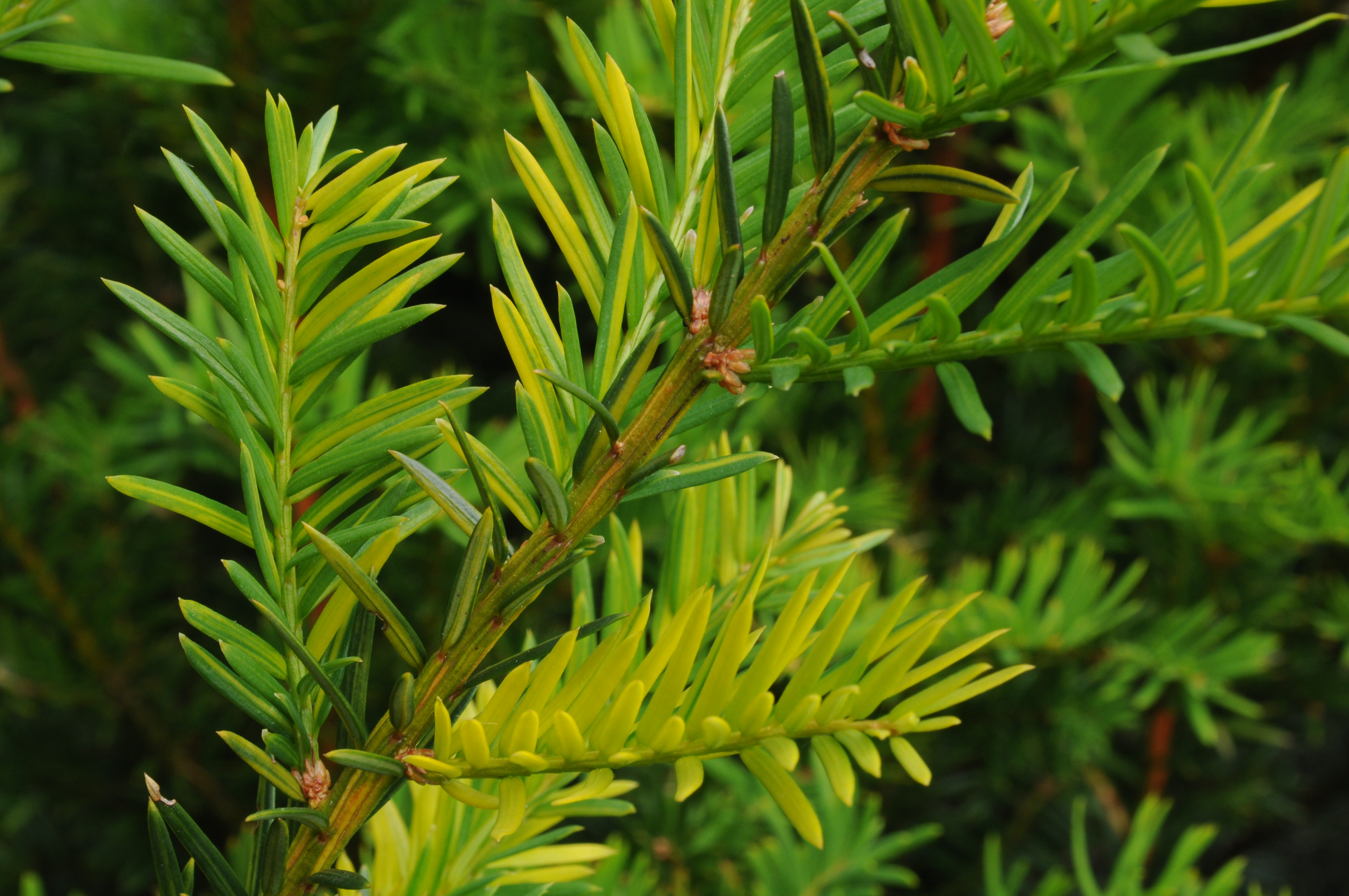
Taxus mosaic

These are produced by grafting genetically different parents, different cultivars or different species (which may belong to different genera). The tissues may be partially fused together following grafting to form a single growing organism that preserves both types of tissue in a single shoot. Just as the constituent species are likely to differ in a wide range of features, so the behavior of their periclinal chimeras is like to be highly variable. The first such known chimera was probably the Bizzarria, which is a fusion of the Florentine citron and the sour orange. Well-known examples of a graft-chimera are Laburnocytisus 'Adamii', caused by a fusion of a Laburnum and a broom, and "Family" trees, where multiple varieties of apple or pear are grafted onto the same tree. Many fruit trees are cultivated by grafting the body of a sapling onto a rootstock.

==== Chromosomal chimeras ====
These are chimeras in which the layers differ in their chromosome constitution. Occasionally, chimeras arise from loss or gain of individual chromosomes or chromosome fragments owing to misdivision. More commonly cytochimeras have simple multiple of the normal chromosome complement in the changed layer. There are various effects on cell size and growth characteristics.

==== Nuclear gene-differential chimeras ====
These chimeras arise by spontaneous or induced mutation of a nuclear gene to a dominant or recessive allele. As a rule, one character is affected at a time in the leaf, flower, fruit, or other parts.

==== Plastid gene-differential chimeras ====
These chimeras arise by spontaneous or induced mutation of a plastid gene, followed by the sorting-out of two kinds of plastid during vegetative growth. Alternatively, after selfing or nucleic acid thermodynamics, plastids may sort-out from a mixed egg or mixed zygote respectively. This type of chimera is recognized at the time of origin by the sorting-out pattern in the leaves. After sorting-out is complete, periclinal chimeras are distinguished from similar looking nuclear gene-differential chimeras by their non-mendelian inheritance. The majority of variegated-leaf chimeras are of this kind.

All plastid gene- and some nuclear gene-differential chimeras affect the color of the plastids within the leaves, and these are grouped together as chlorophyll chimeras, or preferably as variegated leaf chimeras. For most variegation, the mutation involved is the loss of the chloroplasts in the mutated tissue, so that part of the plant tissue has no green pigment and no photosynthetic ability. This mutated tissue is unable to survive on its own, but it is kept alive by its partnership with normal photosynthetic tissue. Sometimes chimeras are also found with layers differing in respect of both their nuclear and their plastid genes.

==== Origins ====
There are multiple reasons to explain the occurrence of plant chimera during the plant recovery stage:

1. The process of shoot organogenesis starts from the multicellular origin.
2. The endogenous tolerance leads to the ineffectiveness of the weak selective agents.
3. A self-protection mechanism (cross protection). Transformed cells serve as guards to protect the untransformed ones.
4. The observable characteristic of transgenic cells may be a transient expression of the marker gene. Or it may due to the presence of agrobacterium cells.

===== Detection =====
Untransformed cells should be easy to detect and remove to avoid chimeras. This is because it is important to maintain the stable ability of the transgenic plants across different generations. Reporter genes such as GUS and Green Fluorescent Protein (GFP) are used in combination with plant selective markers (herbicide, antibody etc.). However, GUS expression depends on the plant development stage and GFP may be influenced by the green tissue autofluorescence. Quantitative PCR could be an alternative method for chimera detection.

=== Viruses ===
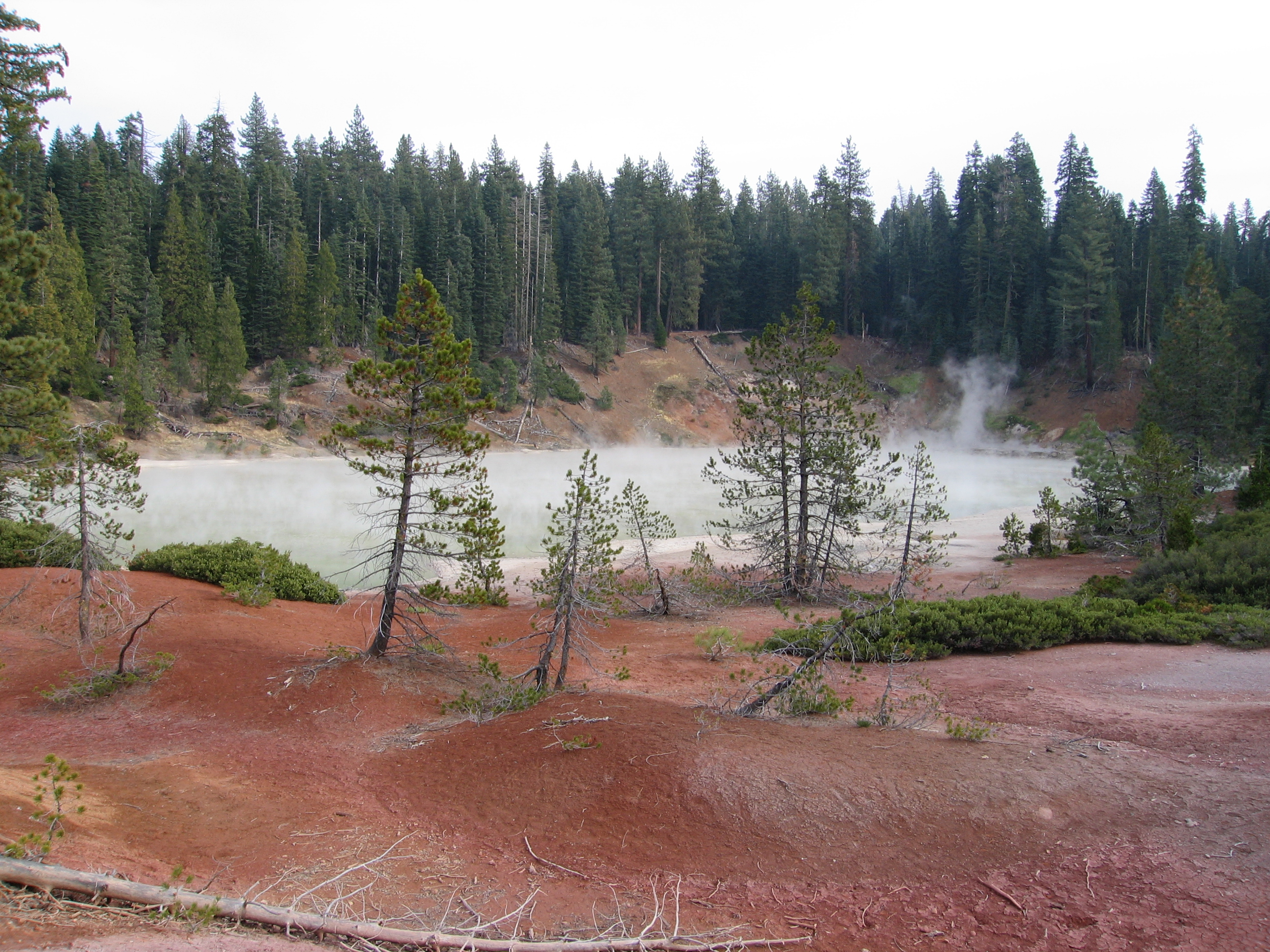
Boiling Springs Lake, California, is where the first natural chimeric virus was found in 2012.

In 2012, the first example of a naturally occurring RNA-DNA hybrid virus was unexpectedly discovered during a metagenomic study of the acidic extreme environment of Boiling Springs Lake in Lassen Volcanic National Park, California. The virus was named BSL-RDHV (Boiling Springs Lake RNA DNA Hybrid Virus). Its genome is related to a DNA circovirus, which usually infects birds and pigs, and a RNA tombusvirus, which infect plants. The study surprised scientists, because DNA and RNA viruses vary and the way the chimera came together was not understood at the time.

Other viral chimeras have also been found, and the group is known as the CHIV viruses ("chimeric viruses").

== Research ==
The first known primate chimeras are the rhesus monkey twins, Roku and Hex, each having six genomes. They were created by mixing cells from totipotent four-cell morulas; although the cells never fused, they worked together to form organs. It was discovered that one of these primates, Roku, was a sexual chimera; as four percent of Roku's blood cells contained two x chromosomes.

A major milestone in chimera experimentation occurred in 1984 when a chimeric sheep–goat was produced by combining embryos from a goat and a sheep, and survived to adulthood.

To research the developmental biology of the bird embryo, researchers produced artificial quail-chick chimeras in 1987. By using transplantation and ablation in the chick embryo stage, the neural tube and the neural crest cells of the chick were ablated, and replaced with the same parts from a quail. Once hatched, the quail feathers were visibly apparent around the wing area, whereas the rest of the chick's body was made of its own chicken cells.

In August 2003, researchers at the Shanghai Second Medical University in China reported that they had successfully fused human skin cells and rabbit ova to create the first human chimeric embryos. The embryos were allowed to develop for several days in a laboratory setting, and then destroyed to harvest the resulting stem cells. In 2007, scientists at the University of Nevada School of Medicine created a sheep whose blood contained 15% human cells and 85% sheep cells.

In 2023 a study reported the first chimeric monkey using embryonic stem cell lines, it was the only live birth from 12 pregnancies resulting from 40 implanted embryos of the crab-eating macaque, an average of 67% and a highest of 92% of the cells across the 26 tested tissues were descendants of the donor stem cells against 0.1–4.5% from previous experiments on chimeric monkeys.

=== Work with mice ===
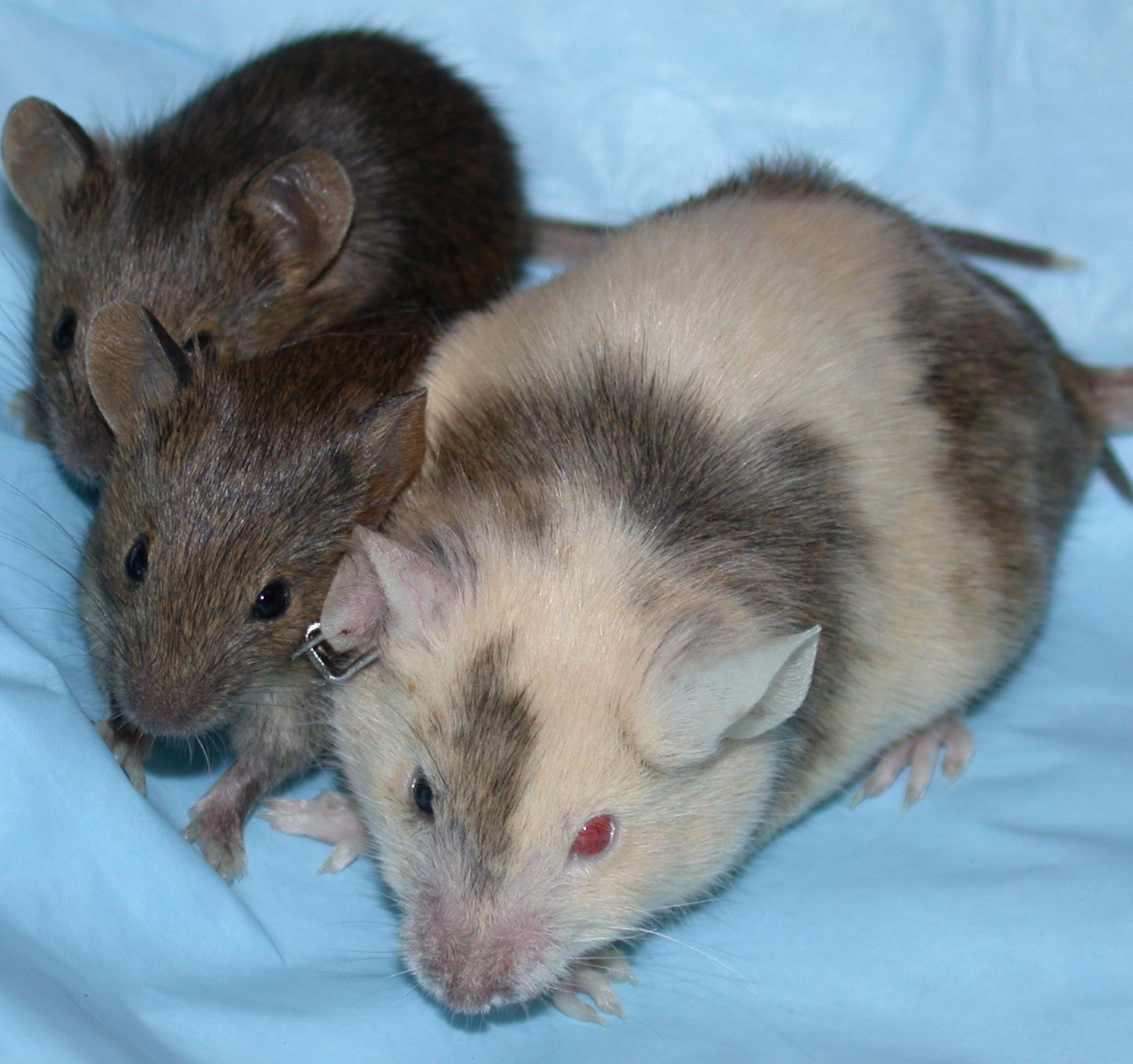
A chimeric mouse with her offspring, which carry the agouti coat color gene; note her pink eye

Chimeric mice are important animals in biological research, as they allow for the investigation of a variety of biological questions in an animal that has two distinct genetic pools within it. These include insights into problems such as the tissue specific requirements of a gene, cell lineage, and cell potential.

The general methods for creating chimeric mice can be summarized either by injection or aggregation of embryonic cells from different origins. The first chimeric mouse was made by Beatrice Mintz in the 1960s through the aggregation of eight-cell-stage embryos. Injection on the other hand was pioneered by Richard Gardner and Ralph Brinster who injected cells into blastocysts to create chimeric mice with germ lines fully derived from injected embryonic stem cells (ES cells). Chimeras can be derived from mouse embryos that have not yet implanted in the uterus as well as from implanted embryos. ES cells from the inner cell mass of an implanted blastocyst can contribute to all cell lineages of a mouse including the germ line. ES cells are a useful tool in chimeras because genes can be mutated in them through the use of homologous recombination, thus allowing gene targeting. Since this discovery occurred in 1988, ES cells have become a key tool in the generation of specific chimeric mice.

==== Underlying biology ====
The ability to make mouse chimeras comes from an understanding of early mouse development. Between the stages of fertilization of the egg and the implantation of a blastocyst into the uterus, different parts of the mouse embryo retain the ability to give rise to a variety of cell lineages. Once the embryo has reached the blastocyst stage, it is composed of several parts, mainly the trophectoderm, the inner cell mass, and the primitive endoderm. Each of these parts of the blastocyst gives rise to different parts of the embryo; the inner cell mass gives rise to the embryo proper, while the trophectoderm and primitive endoderm give rise to extra embryonic structures that support growth of the embryo. Two- to eight-cell-stage embryos are competent for making chimeras, since at these stages of development, the cells in the embryos are not yet committed to give rise to any particular cell lineage, and could give rise to the inner cell mass or the trophectoderm. In the case where two diploid eight-cell-stage embryos are used to make a chimera, chimerism can be later found in the epiblast, primitive endoderm, and trophectoderm of the mouse blastocyst.

It is possible to dissect the embryo at other stages so as to accordingly give rise to one lineage of cells from an embryo selectively and not the other. For example, subsets of blastomeres can be used to give rise to chimera with specified cell lineage from one embryo. The Inner Cell Mass of a diploid blastocyst, for example, can be used to make a chimera with another blastocyst of eight-cell diploid embryo; the cells taken from the inner cell mass will give rise to the primitive endoderm and to the epiblast in the chimera mouse.

From this knowledge, ES cell contributions to chimeras have been developed. ES cells can be used in combination with eight-cell-and two-cell-stage embryos to make chimeras and exclusively give rise to the embryo proper. Embryos that are to be used in chimeras can be further genetically altered to specifically contribute to only one part of chimera. An example is the chimera built off of ES cells and tetraploid embryos, which are artificially made by electrofusion of two two-cell diploid embryos. The tetraploid embryo will exclusively give rise to the trophectoderm and primitive endoderm in the chimera.

==== Methods of production ====
There are a variety of combinations that can give rise to a successful chimera mouse and – according to the goal of the experiment – an appropriate cell and embryo combination can be picked; they are generally but not limited to diploid embryo and ES cells, diploid embryo and diploid embryo, ES cell and tetraploid embryo, diploid embryo and tetraploid embryo, ES cells and ES cells. The combination of embryonic stem cell and diploid embryo is a common technique used for the making of chimeric mice, since gene targeting can be done in the embryonic stem cell. These kinds of chimeras can be made through either aggregation of stem cells and the diploid embryo or injection of the stem cells into the diploid embryo. If embryonic stem cells are to be used for gene targeting to make a chimera, the following procedure is common: a construct for homologous recombination for the gene targeted will be introduced into cultured mouse embryonic stem cells from the donor mouse, by way of electroporation; cells positive for the recombination event will have antibiotic resistance, provided by the insertion cassette used in the gene targeting; and be able to be positively selected for. ES cells with the correct targeted gene are then injected into a diploid host mouse blastocyst. Then, these injected blastocysts are implanted into a pseudo pregnant female surrogate mouse, which will bring the embryos to term and give birth to a mouse whose germline is derived from the donor mouse's ES cells. This same procedure can be achieved through aggregation of ES cells and diploid embryos, diploid embryos are cultured in aggregation plates in wells where single embryos can fit, to these wells ES cells are added the aggregates are cultured until a single embryo is formed and has progressed to the blastocyst stage, and can then be transferred to the surrogate mouse.

== Ethics and legislation ==
The US and Western Europe have strict codes of ethics and regulations in place that expressly forbid certain subsets of experimentation using human cells, though there is a vast difference in the regulatory framework. Through the creation of human chimeras comes the question: where does society now draw the line of humanity? This question poses serious legal and moral issues, along with creating controversy. Chimpanzees, for example, are not offered any legal standing, and are euthanised if they pose a threat to humans. If a chimpanzee is genetically altered to be more similar to a human, it may blur the ethical line between animal and human. Legal debate would be the next step in the process to determine whether certain chimeras should be granted legal rights. Along with issues regarding the rights of chimeras, individuals have expressed concern about whether or not creating human chimeras diminishes the "dignity" of being human.

== See also ==
- 46,XX/46,XY
- CAR T cell
- Fusion protein
- Genetic chimerism in fiction
- Polycephaly
- Retron
- Vanishing twin
- X-inactivation (lyonization)
