= Q-machine =

A Q-machine is a device that is used in experimental plasma physics. The name Q-machine stems from the original intention of creating a quiescent plasma that is free from the fluctuations that are present in plasmas created in electric discharges. The Q-machine was first described in a publication by Rynn and D'Angelo.

The Q-machine plasma is created at a plate that has been heated to about 2000 K and hence is called the hot plate. Electrons are emitted by the hot plate through thermionic emission, and ions are created through contact ionization of atoms of alkali metals that have low ionization potentials. The hot plate is made of a metal that has a large work function and can withstand high temperatures, e.g. tungsten or rhenium. The alkali metal is boiled in an oven that is designed to direct a beam of alkaline metal vapor onto the hot plate. A high value of the hot plate work function and a low ionization potential of the metal makes for a low potential barrier for an electron in the alkaline metal to overcome, thus making the ionization process more efficient. Sometimes barium is used instead of an alkaline metal due to its excellent spectroscopic properties. The fractional ionization of a Q-machine plasma can approach unity, which can be orders of magnitude greater than that predicted by the Saha ionization equation.

The temperature of the Q-machine plasma is close to the temperature of the hot plate, and the ion and electron temperatures are similar. Although this temperature (about 2000 K) is high compared to room temperature, it is much lower than electron temperatures that are usually found in discharge plasma. The low temperature makes it possible to create a plasma column that is several ion gyro radii across. Since the alkaline metals are solids at room temperature they will stick to the walls of the machine on impact, and therefore the neutral pressure can be kept so low that for all practical purposes the plasma is fully ionised.

Plasma research that has been performed using Q-machines includes current driven ion cyclotron waves, Kelvin-Helmholtz waves, and electron phase space holes.

Today, Q-machines can be found at West Virginia University and at the University of Iowa in the US, at Tohoku University in Sendai in Japan, and at the University of Innsbruck in Austria.
