= Single molecule fluorescent sequencing =

DNA sequencing method

Single molecule fluorescent sequencing is one method of DNA sequencing. The core principle is the imaging of individual fluorophore molecules, each corresponding to one base. By working on single molecule level, amplification of DNA is not required, avoiding amplification bias. The method lends itself to parallelization by probing many sequences simultaneously, imaging all of them at the same time.

The principle can be applied stepwise (e.g. the Helicos implementation), or in real time (as in the Pacific Biosciences implementation).
