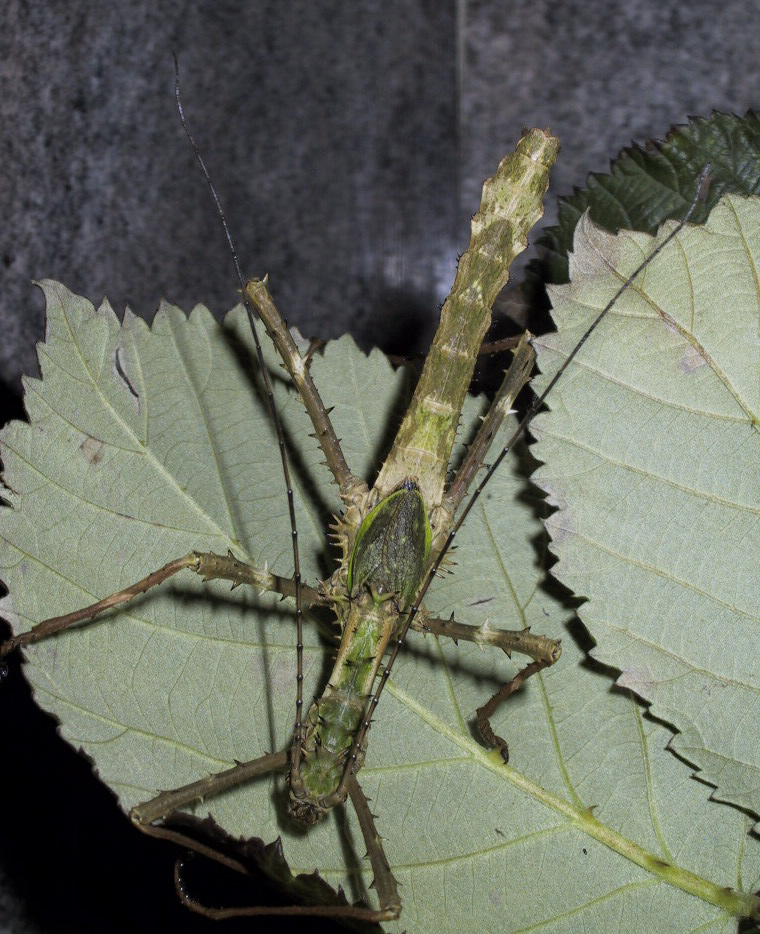
- Haaniella erringtoniae, male

Scientific classification
- Domain: Eukaryota
- Kingdom: Animalia
- Phylum: Arthropoda
- Class: Insecta
- Order: Phasmatodea
- Family: Heteropterygidae
- Subfamily: Heteropteryginae
- Tribe: Heteropterygini
- Genus: Haaniella
- Species: H. erringtoniae

Binomial name
- Haaniella erringtoniae (Redtenbacher, 1906)

Synonyms
- Heteropteryx erringtoniae Redtenbacher, 1906; Haaniella muelleri erringtoniae (Redtenbacher, 1906)

= Haaniella erringtoniae =

Species of stick insect

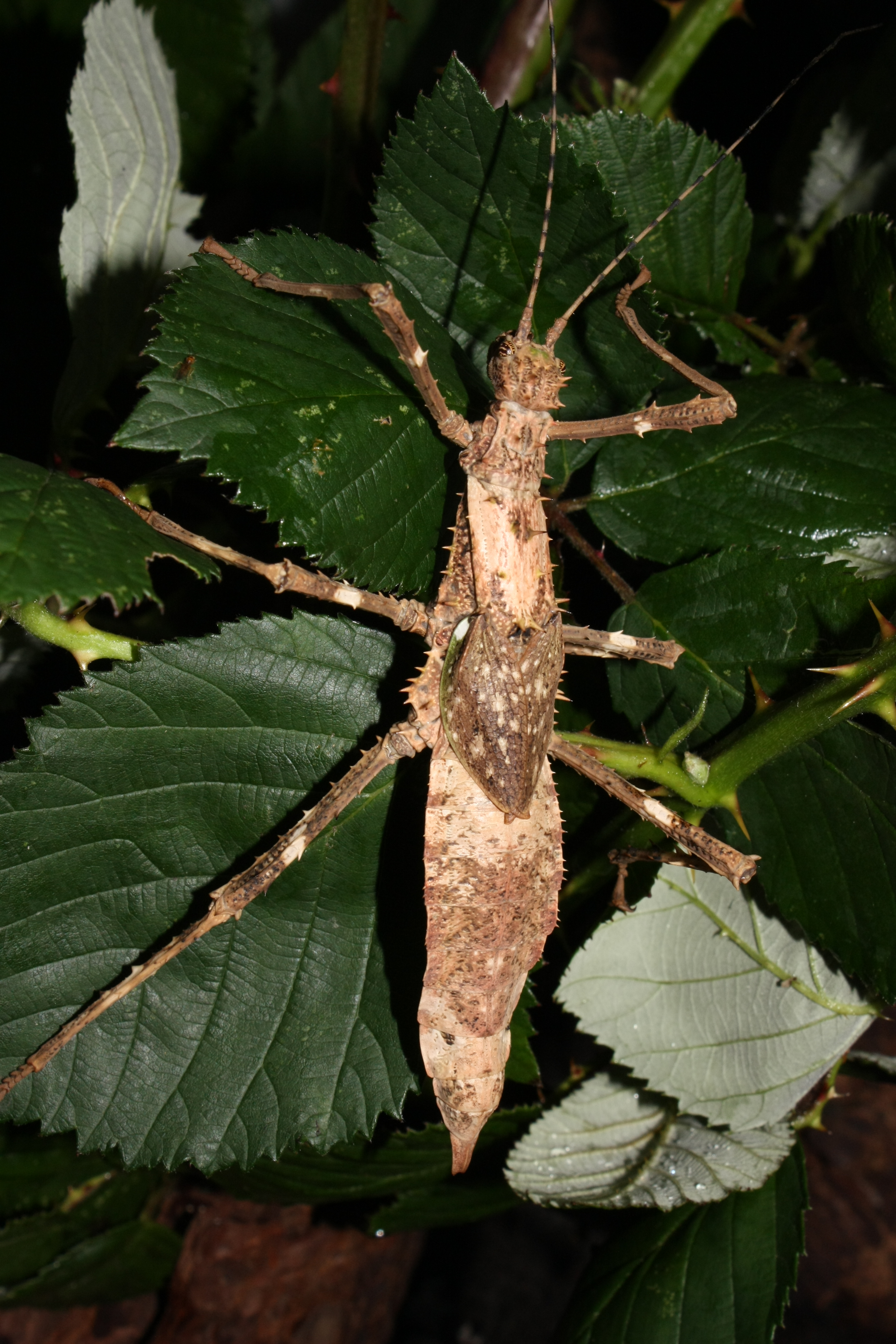
female

Haaniella erringtoniae is a stick insect species. It is a typical representative of the subfamily Heteropteryginae. The occasionally used common name Errington's Haaniella refers to the species name.

== Description ==
Both sexes are armed with many spines on the body and legs. Fore and hind wings are greatly shortened. The sexual dimorphism typical of stick insects is also very pronounced in this species. The slimmer, little patterned to monochrome males are gray-brown to greenish in color and are about 65 to 80 millimetres (2.6 to 3.1 in) long. The bright green front edges of the thickened, only 10 millimetres (0.39 in) long front wings, which are here developed as tegmina, are striking. The bigger females reach a length of 85 to 110 millimetres (3.3 to 4.3 in). They are reddish-brown and beige, or occasionally a light pink piebald. Typical are the light-colored bandages on the femurs and two rows of white dots on the ventral abdomen. The for Heteropterygini species typical secondary ovipositor is beak-shaped.

== Distribution and way of life ==
The species is native to Malesia more precisely on the Malay Peninsula. The animals found in the west of the island Sumatra are Haaniella muelleri.

During the day the insects hide in the leafy layer of the forest floor, where they are very well camouflaged due to their color and body shape. Do not climb until dusk they hit trees and bushes to eat the leaves. In the event of danger, both sexes are able to produce rustling noises with their wings (stridulation). In addition, the animals then threaten the attacker with the abdomen raised and the hind legs splayed upwards. When approaching further, the tibae of the hind legs are quickly struck against the femurs, making the spines on them very effective weapons of defense.

== Reproduction ==
The females lay their eggs a few centimeters deep in the ground with the laying stinger. With a length of about 6.5 millimetres (0.26 in) and a width of 5.5 millimetres (0.22 in), these are not even particularly large compared to the eggs of other representatives of this genus. In contrast to most of other Haaniella species, they are not rough and bristled, but smooth and hairless, like the lemon-shaped eggs of Haaniella saussurei. The cruciform micropylar plate with the clearly visible micropyle in the lower corner of the cross is striking. The life cycle of Haaniella erringtoniae is shorter in each phase than that of most of other Haaniella species, like those known from Borneo. After only six months, the first nymphs hatch from the eggs, which are often already adult after a further six months.

== Taxonomy ==
The species was described in 1906 by Josef Redtenbacher as Heteropteryx erringtoniae. He chose the specific epithet in honor of her discoverer Madam Errington. A female was deposited in the Muséum national d'histoire naturelle as holotype.

Klaus Günther transferred the species to the genus Haaniella in 1944 and at the same time transferred it to Haaniella muelleri as a subspecies. Paul Brock mentioned in 1995 that he sees no reason for the status of a subspecies and thinks it would be a synonym of Haaniella muelleri. Only Frank H. Hennemann et al. validate the species again in 2016, with Brock being a co-author of the paper. They also place Haaniella erringtoniae together with Haaniella aculeata, Haaniella glaber, Haaniella gintingi, Haaniella jacobsoni, Haaniella kerincia, Haaniella macroptera, Haaniella mecheli, Haaniella muelleri and Haaniella rosenbergii in the "muelleri" species group. In addition to Haaniella erringtoniae, Haaniella gintingi was also included in a molecular genetic study published in 2021. This turned out to be a sister species to Haaniella gorochovi, which was assigned to a different species group. Although both species are more closely related to Haaniella erringtoniae than the Haaniella species from Borneo that were also examined, Heteropteryx dilatata and its undescribed sister species are even more closely related to Haaniella erringtoniae.

== In terraristics ==
The specimens introduced in the early 1990s from the Templar Park in Malay Perak were initially distributed under the name Haaniella muelleri in terrariums. Only the comparison with the type specimens showed that the specimens kept are Haaniella erringtoniae. All publications about this insects in breeding up to 2009 refer to Haaniella erringtoniae.

The species prefers temperatures of 22 to 27 °C (72 to 81 °F) and high humidity. In the terrarium they can easily be fed with oak and bramble leaves. A slightly moist substrate is required to lay eggs, which should cover the floor of the terrarium 5 to 10 centimetres (2.0 to 3.9 in) high.

Haniella erringtoniae is listed under PSG number 112 by the Phasmid Study Group.

== Gallery ==
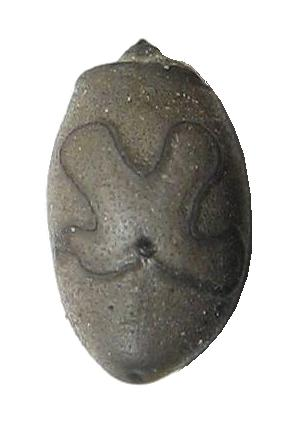
egg

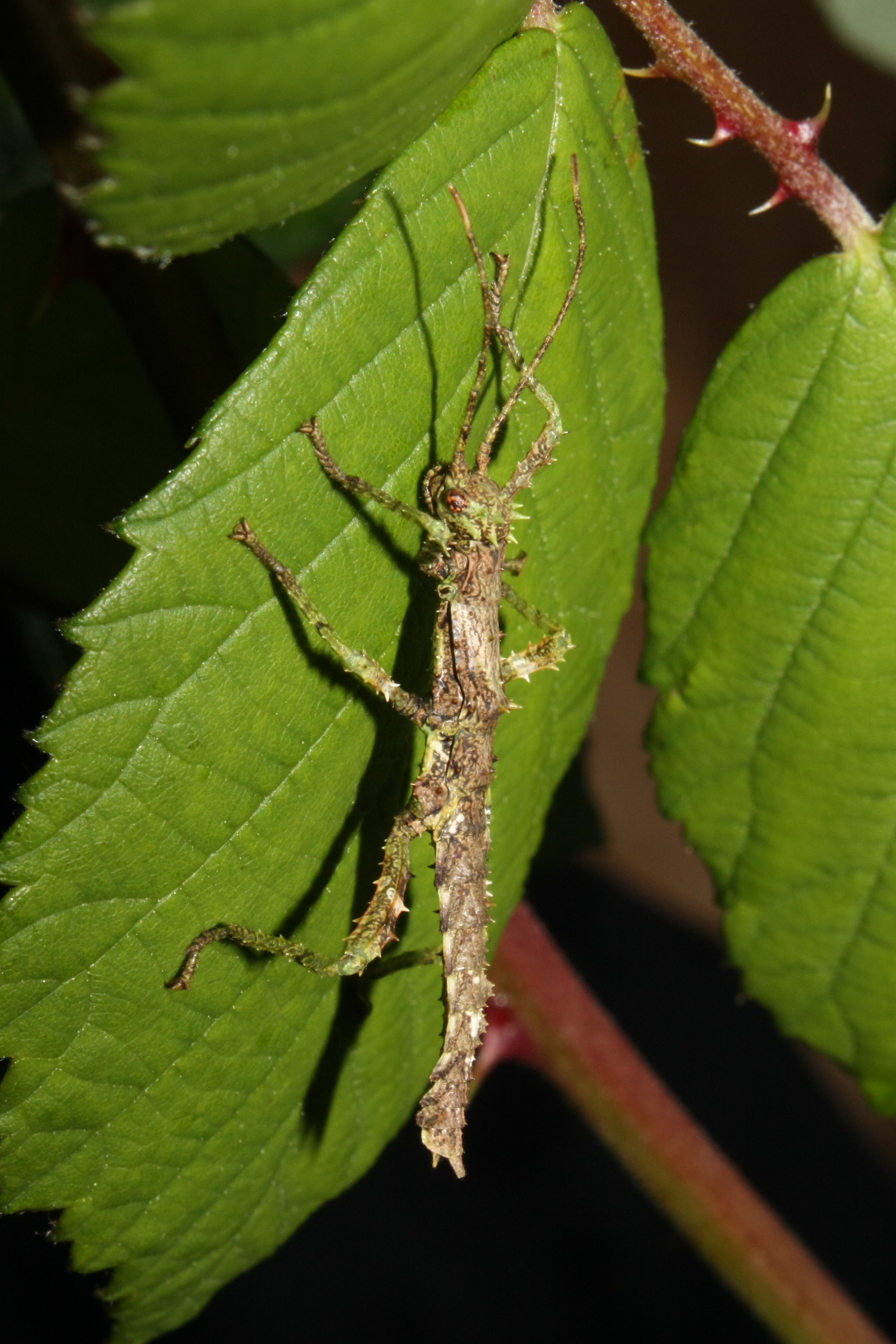
newly hatched nymph

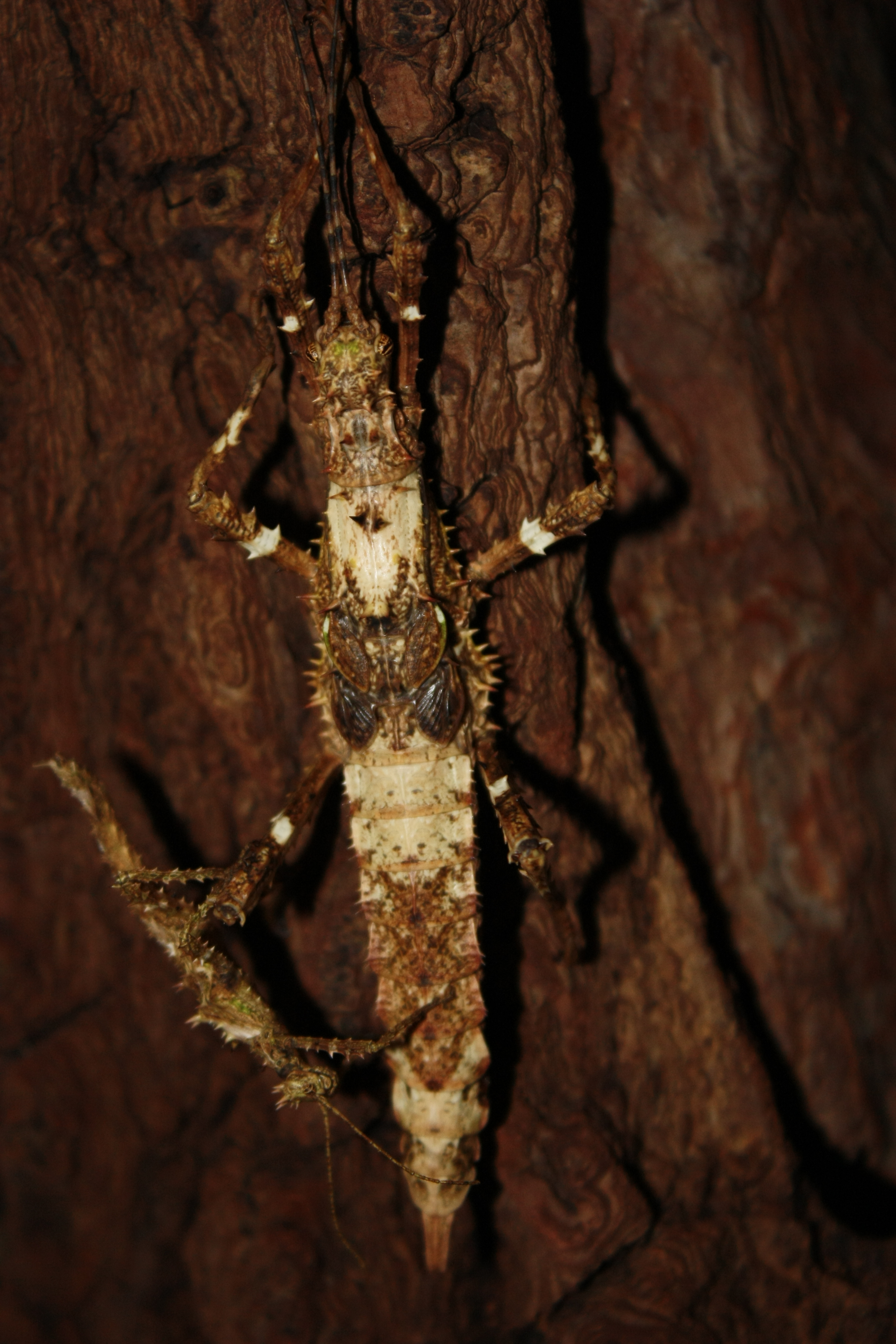
L2 nymph and subadult female

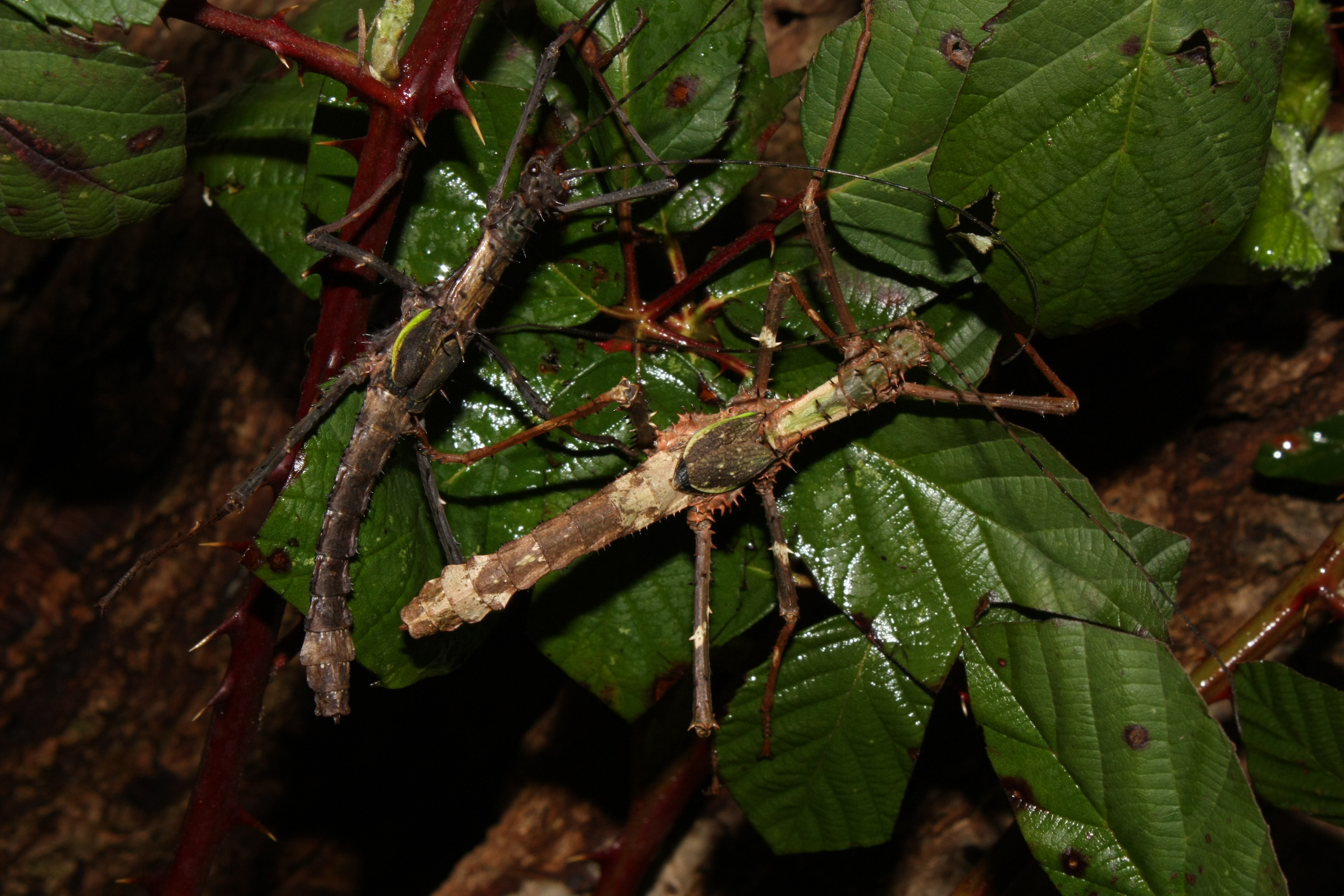
differently colored males
