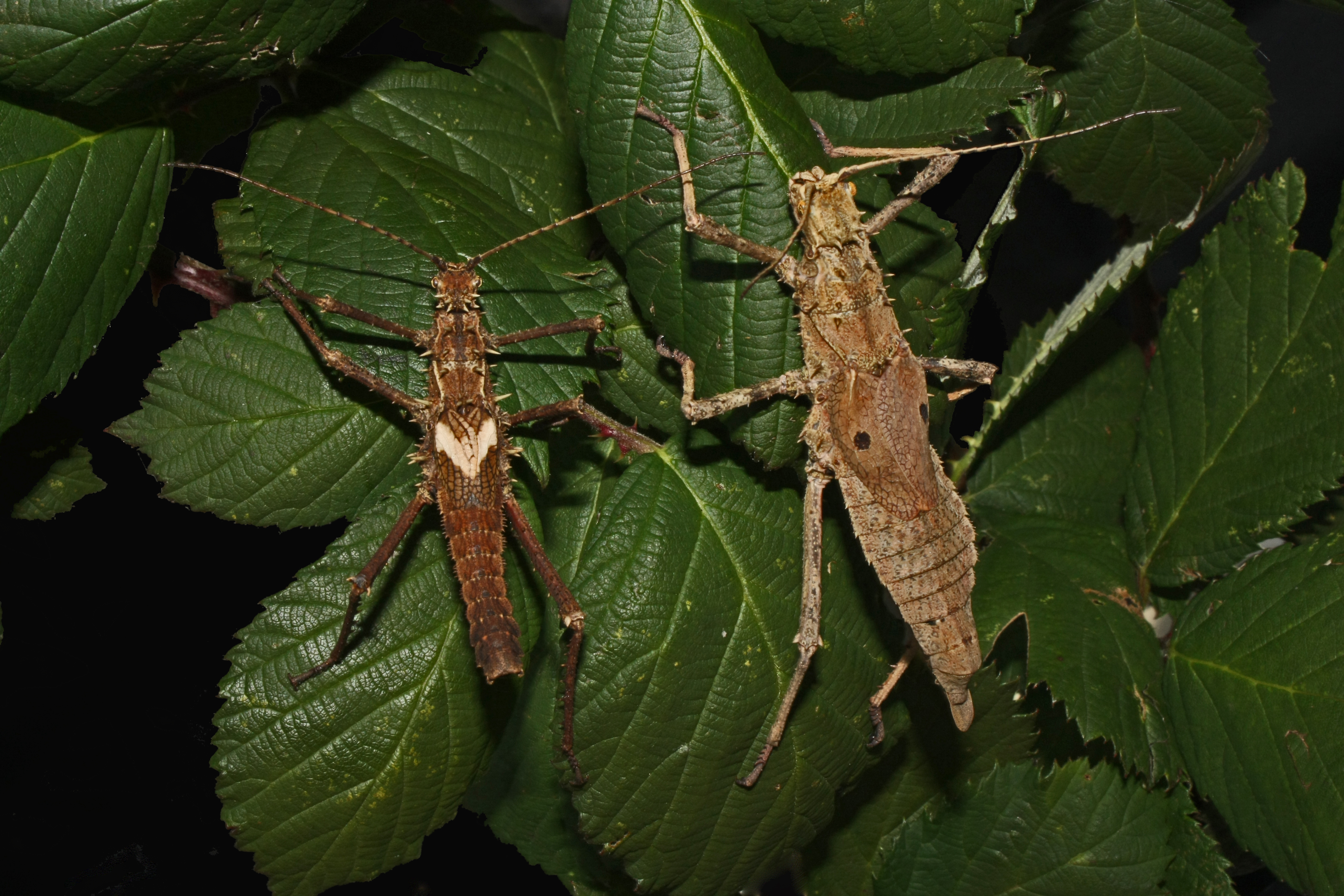
- Haaniella scabra, left male, right female

Scientific classification
- Domain: Eukaryota
- Kingdom: Animalia
- Phylum: Arthropoda
- Class: Insecta
- Order: Phasmatodea
- Family: Heteropterygidae
- Subfamily: Heteropteryginae
- Tribe: Heteropterygini
- Genus: Haaniella
- Species: H. scabra

Binomial name
- Haaniella scabra (Redtenbacher, 1906)

Synonyms
- Heteropteryx scabra Redtenbacher, 1906; Haaniella grayi scabra (Redtenbacher, 1906); Haaniella echinata scabra (Redtenbacher, 1906)

= Haaniella scabra =

Species of stick insect

Haaniella scabra is a species of stick insect native to Borneo and a typical representative of the subfamily Heteropteryginae. The occasionally used common name Small Haaniella refers to the size of this.

== Description ==
Haaniella scabra primarily differs from most of the other representatives of the genus by its much smaller size. Many sharp spines can also be found in this species on the head, body and legs of both sexes. The formation of the wings also corresponds to that of the other Haaniella species. Both pairs of wings are shortened, with the forewings, which are designed as tegmina, completely covering the hindwings, which have been transformed into stridulation organs.

The males are only 45 to 57 millimetres (1.8 to 2.2 in) long. The abdomen and legs are usually dark brown in color. The head and thorax are drawn somewhat livelier due to lighter parts. The spines in particular are usually very light or almost white. The forewings at rest reveal an equally bright V-shaped pattern. The remaining wing areas are brown with black veining. The long, also light-colored spines on the underside of the abdomen are also striking. The underside of the sterna of the thorax is fawn brown and thus forms a clear contrast to the black colored membranes between the segments and joints.

The females are significantly larger than the males with a body length of 59 to 76 millimetres (2.3 to 3.0 in). Their abdomen ends with the spine-like ovipositor typical of the subfamily Heteropteryginae. The ventral subgenital plate of this laying apparatus, which is also known as the operculum, is significantly longer than the dorsal part, which is called the supraanal plate or epiproct. In Haaniella scabra, the end of the supraanal plate is characterized by the presence of two to eight fine teeth. The abdomen swells in adult females during the oviposition phase, as in other species of the genus. The coloring is dominated by a rather simple light brown tone. A slight pattern is usually only visible on the head. Small, dark eyespots may be present on the upper side of the abdomen at about the level of the eighth abdominal segment. Some females also have very lightly colored areas on the abdomen, mostly around the sixth abdominal segment. This drawing is then already present in the nymphs. Both adult females and older nymphs have the typical blue-black synovial and intersegmental membranes, complemented by orange-red areas on the sternum, hind coxae, and undersides of hind femurs. In addition, a black spot can almost always be found on the middle of the outer edges of the forewings.

== Distribution and way of life ==
The distribution area of Haaniella scabra is limited to the high mountain regions around Mount Kinabalu in the center of the Malaysian state of Sabah, in the northern part of Borneo. There the animals can be found at altitudes between 1,000 to 1,800 metres (3,300 to 5,900 ft).

In its behavior, this nocturnal species resembles the other representatives of the genus from Borneo. It shows the same defensive behavior, consisting of spreading the held up spiked hind legs and closing them when touched by an attacker. The females also lay their eggs in the ground at night using the ovipositor. Although the hairy eggs are smaller than those of the other species, measuring 6 to 7 millimetres (0.24 to 0.28 in) in length and 4.5 to 5 millimetres (0.18 to 0.20 in) in width, they are still quite large for the size of the animals. They also show a diagonally cross-shaped micropylar plate in the lower angle of which the micropyle is located. After 8 to 18 months, the 24 millimetres (0.94 in) long nymphs hatch, and they need another 18 months to become adults. Older nymphs also have the high-contrast colored underside of the imagines' bodies. The average life expectancy of this species, which comes from the cool high mountains, is significantly higher than that of the other species. For example, a wild-caught female cared for by Oskar V. Conle reached an age of more than five years.

== Taxonomy ==
In 1906, Josef Redtenbacher initially described the species as Heteropteryx scabra, thus ignoring the description of the genus Haaniella published by William Forsell Kirby in 1904. The species name "scabra" was chosen in allusion to the rough surface of the body caused by the spines (Latin scabrum = rough). Klaus Günther placed the species in 1932 as a subspecies of Haaniella grayii, but changed this assignment in 1944 and assigned it again as a subspecies to Haaniella echinata. As early as 1938, it was designated by John William Holman Rehn as a separate species and addressed as Haaniella scabra. Only when the first specimens were imported to Europe by Cocking in 1984 were the animals examined again. Since a 1985 publication, also by Cocking, Haaniella scabra has again been considered a valid species. A total of four syntypes are deposited at museums in Vienna, Saint Petersburg and Paris. The male specimen of the two syntypes located in Vienna has been determined as the lectotype.

Frank H. Hennemann et al. divided the genus into three species groups in 2016. Haaniella scabra has been assigned to the "echinata" species group along with Haaniella echinata and Haaniella saussurei. This assignment could not be fully confirmed by a molecular genetic study from 2021. Sarah Bank et al. included among others the species originating from Borneo in their investigation and showed that Haaniella saussurei has a special position within the genus, while all other species originating from Borneo are relatively closely related to each other. Haaniella grayii proved to be the sister species of Haaniella scabra.

== In terraristics ==
After Cocking introduced animals for terraristics for the first time in 1984, further animals were not imported again until 1996. The species is listed under PSG number 70 by the Phasmid Study Group.

Although small to medium-sized terrariums are sufficient for keeping Haaniella scabra, the species is considered very delicate. Mortality is often very high, especially in the first few weeks after hatching. The terrarium should be provided with suitable hiding places and a substrate that is suitable for laying eggs and is always slightly moist. In addition to high humidity, temperatures of an average to a maximum of 20 °C (68 °F) are necessary for successful keeping. Diet is not a problem, because in addition to leaves from Rosaceae such as bramble, Crataegus and firethorn, oak, ivy and other plants are also eaten.

== Gallery ==
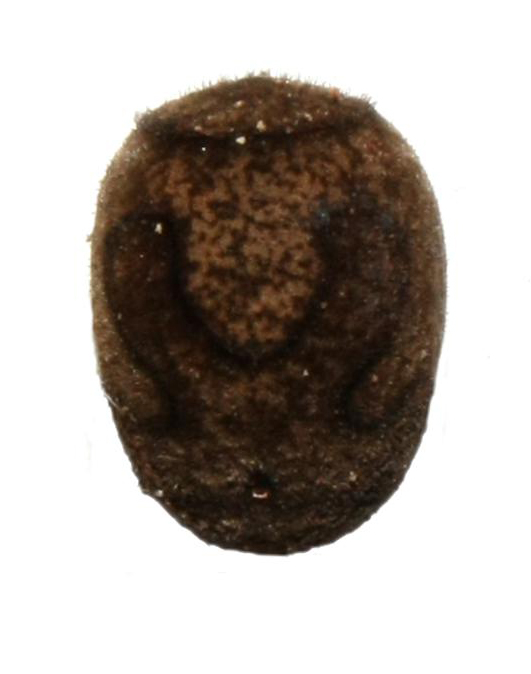
egg

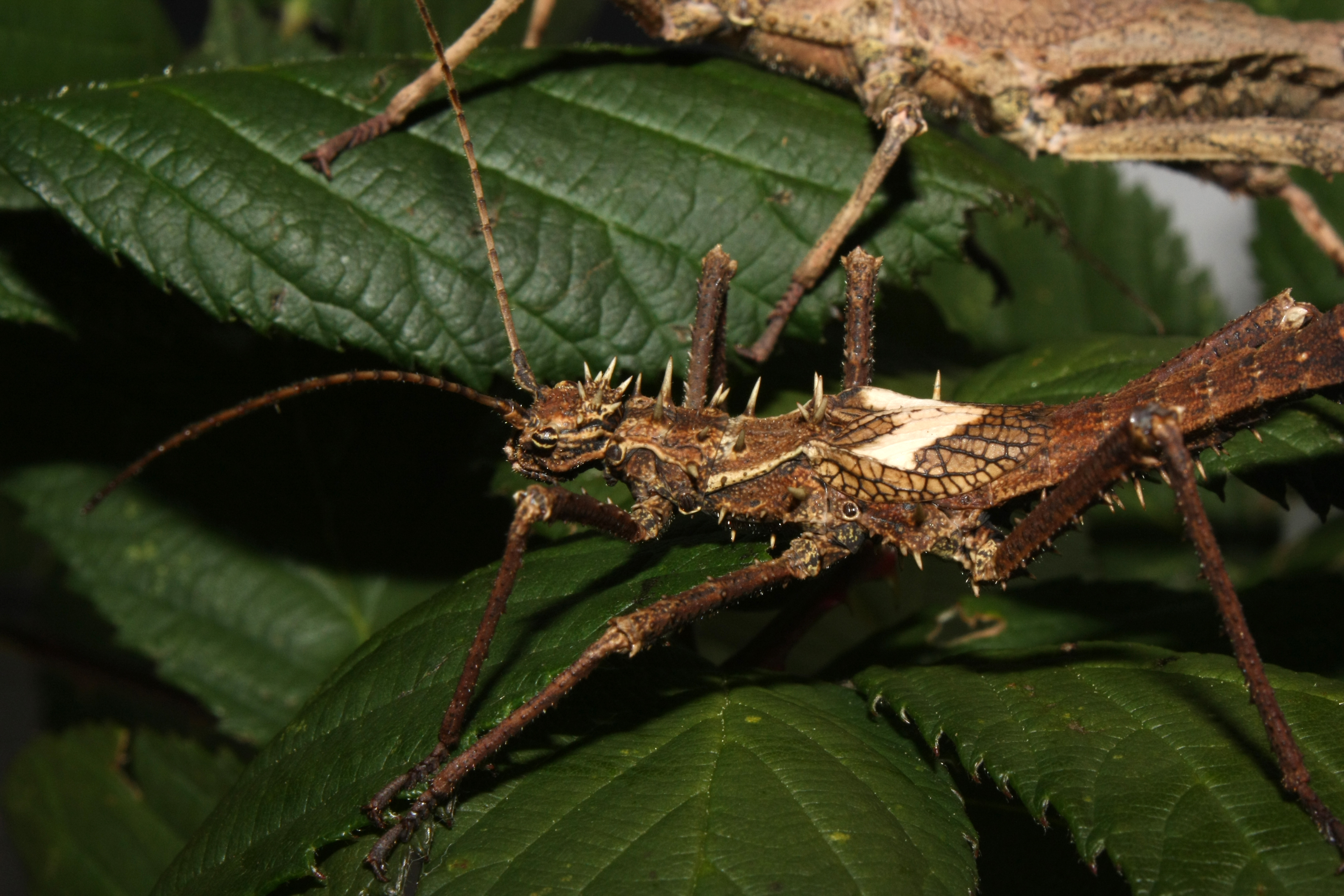
portrait of a male

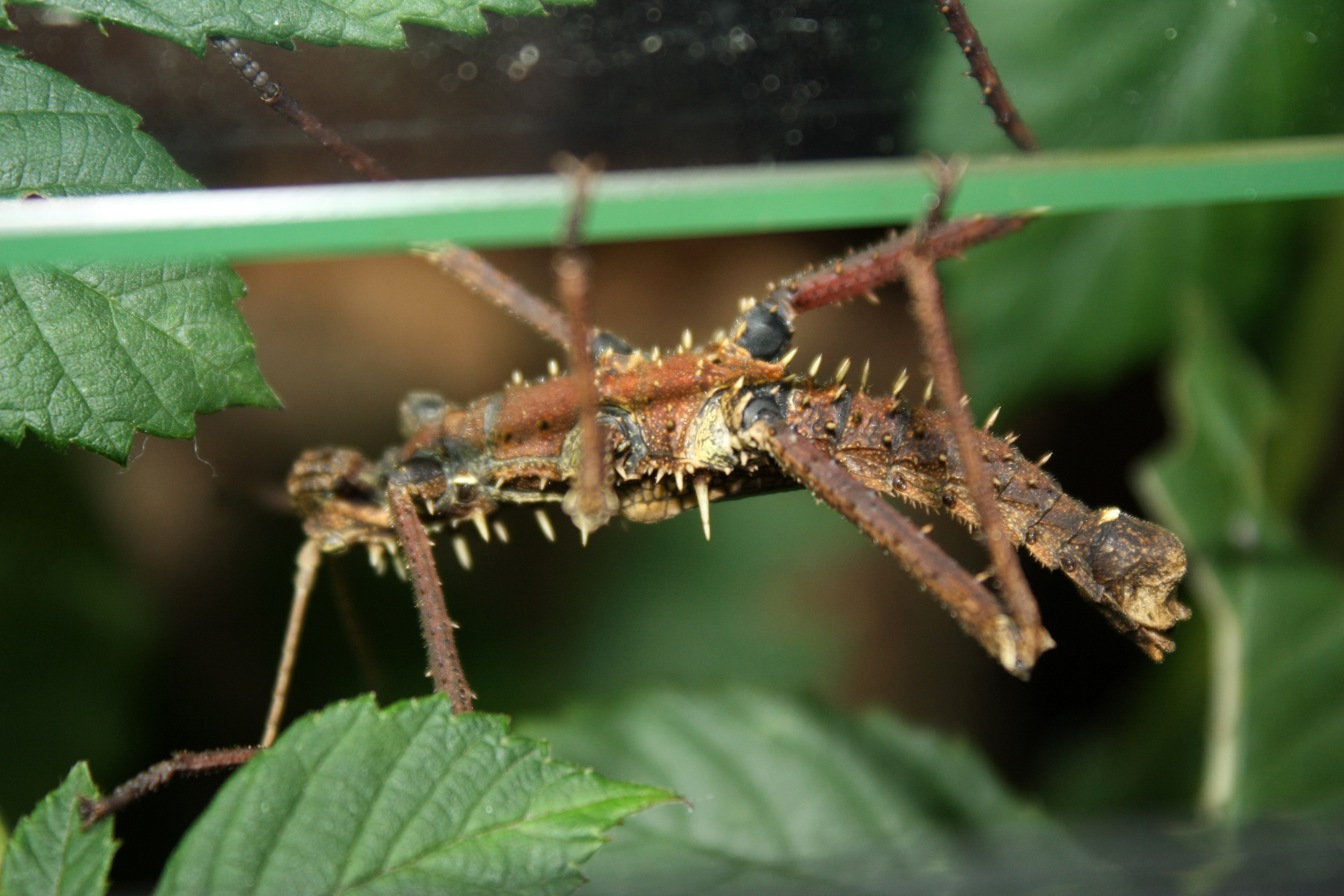
bottom view of a male

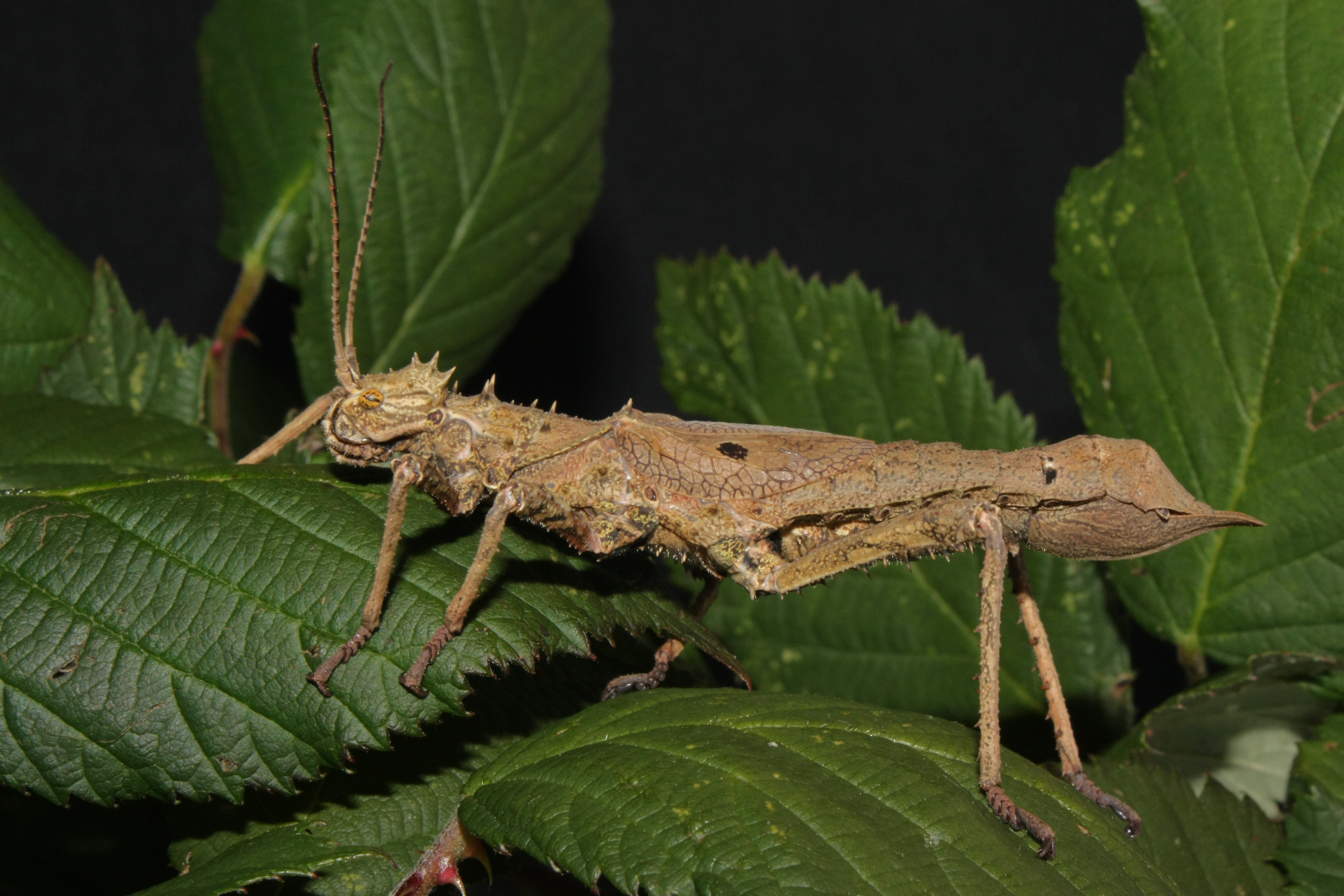
females
