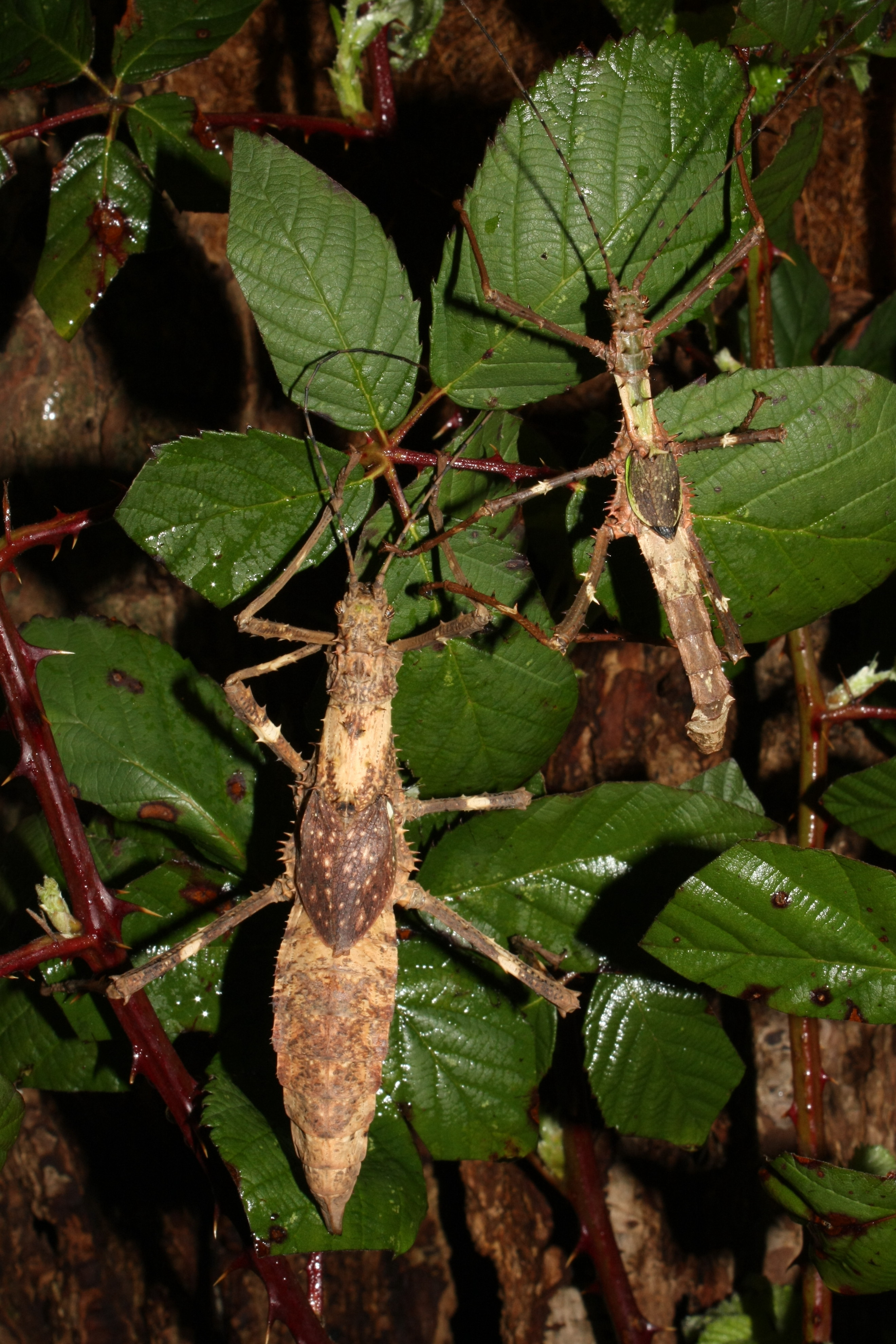
- Haaniella erringtoniae, pair

Scientific classification
- Kingdom: Animalia
- Phylum: Arthropoda
- Clade: Pancrustacea
- Class: Insecta
- Order: Phasmatodea
- Family: Heteropterygidae
- Tribe: Heteropterygini
- Genus: Haaniella; Kirby, 1904

Type species
- Haaniella muelleri (de Haan, 1842)

Species
- List: Haaniella aculeata; Haaniella azlini; Haaniella dehaanii; Haaniella echinata; Haaniella erringtoniae; Haaniella gintingi; Haaniella glaber; Haaniella gorochovi; Haaniella grayii; Haaniella jacobsoni; Haaniella kerincia; Haaniella mecheli; Haaniella muelleri; Haaniella parva; Haaniella rosenbergii; Haaniella saussurei; Haaniella scabra
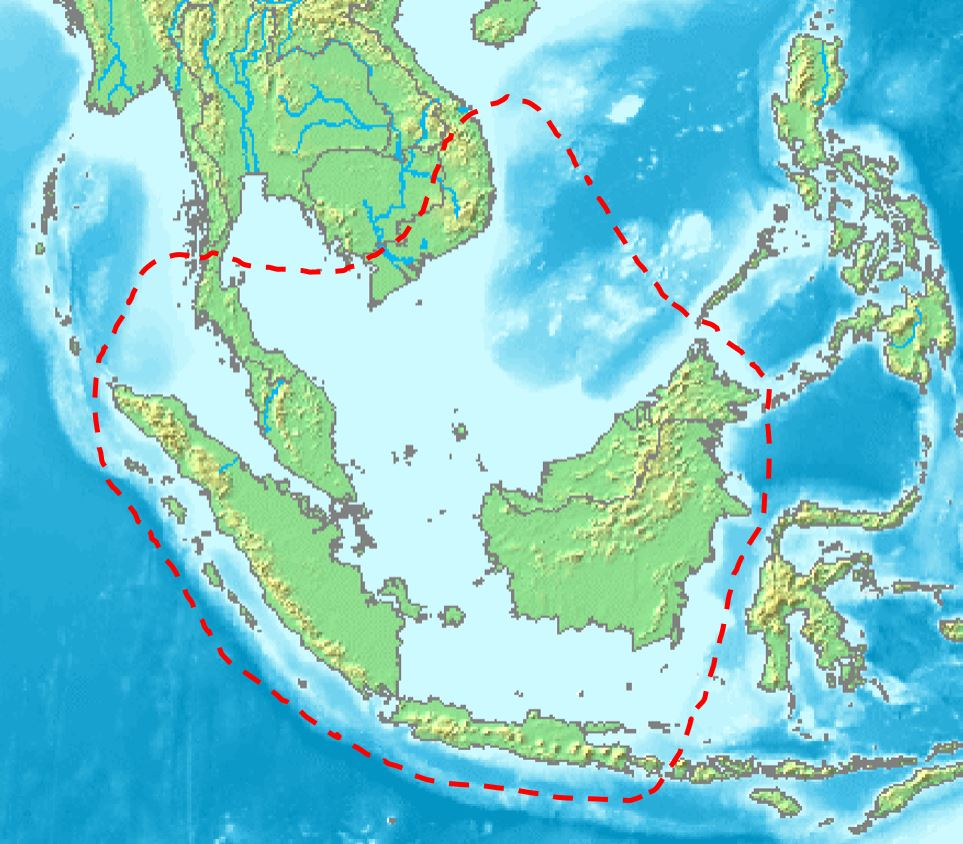
- Range of Haaniella

Synonyms
- Heteropteryx Redtenbacher, 1906; Miniopteryx Zompro, 2004

= Haaniella =

Haaniella Temporal range: 35–0 Ma Eocene to present

Genus of stick insects

Haaniella is a genus of the Phasmatodea family Heteropterygidae from Southeast Asia.

== Characteristics ==
The species of the genus Haaniella reach a body length of 4.5 to 16.5 cm in the female sex. The males, which are 2.5 to 9.8 cm in length, are always smaller and have a slimmer abdomen than the females, whose abdomen, especially in the middle, is wider than the rest of the body. In females, as in all members of the subfamily Heteropteryginae, the abdomen ends in a secondary ovipositor, which surrounds the actual ovipositor. The fore wings (tegmina) of the adult females only just reach the abdomen. They also end at this height in the males of most species. Only the wings of males of Haaniella aculeata, Haaniella glaber and Haaniella mecheli are significantly longer and have a similar wing construction as those of Heteropteryx dilatata. Their narrow fore wings cover half or part of almost the entire abdomen. The hind wings below are usually even longer. In the short-winged representatives, the also very short hind wings are completely covered by the forewings and are converted into stridulation organs, which are used for defense stridulation.

Characteristic of the species living on Borneo, i.e. Haaniella dehaanii, Haaniella echinata, Haaniella grayii, Haaniella saussurei and Haaniella scabra are the strongly colored intermediate membranes in the area of the hind and middle coxae and in some cases the membranes between the abdominal sternites, especially in the youth stages. These are usually colored in a species-specific manner. Many Haaniella species can be distinguished from each other in particular by the arrangement of their spines (acanthotaxy).

== Distribution area ==
The main distribution areas of the previously known species are Sumatra, where ten species are endemic and Borneo with five endemic species. Further representatives can be found on the Malay Peninsula, in Singapore and the island Simeulue. With South Vietnam the distribution area of Haaniella gorochovi is a specialty.
Most of the species inhabit tropical rainforests from the plains up to an altitude of 800 m. Haaniella scabra, on the other hand, is a mountain species and is native to cooler altitudes between 1000 and 1800 m. The location of Haaniella gintingi is also relatively high. The species was discovered by Jimmy Gideon Ginting in November 2010 in northern Sumatra near Mount Sibayak at an altitude of 1400 to 1600 m.

== Way of life and reproduction ==
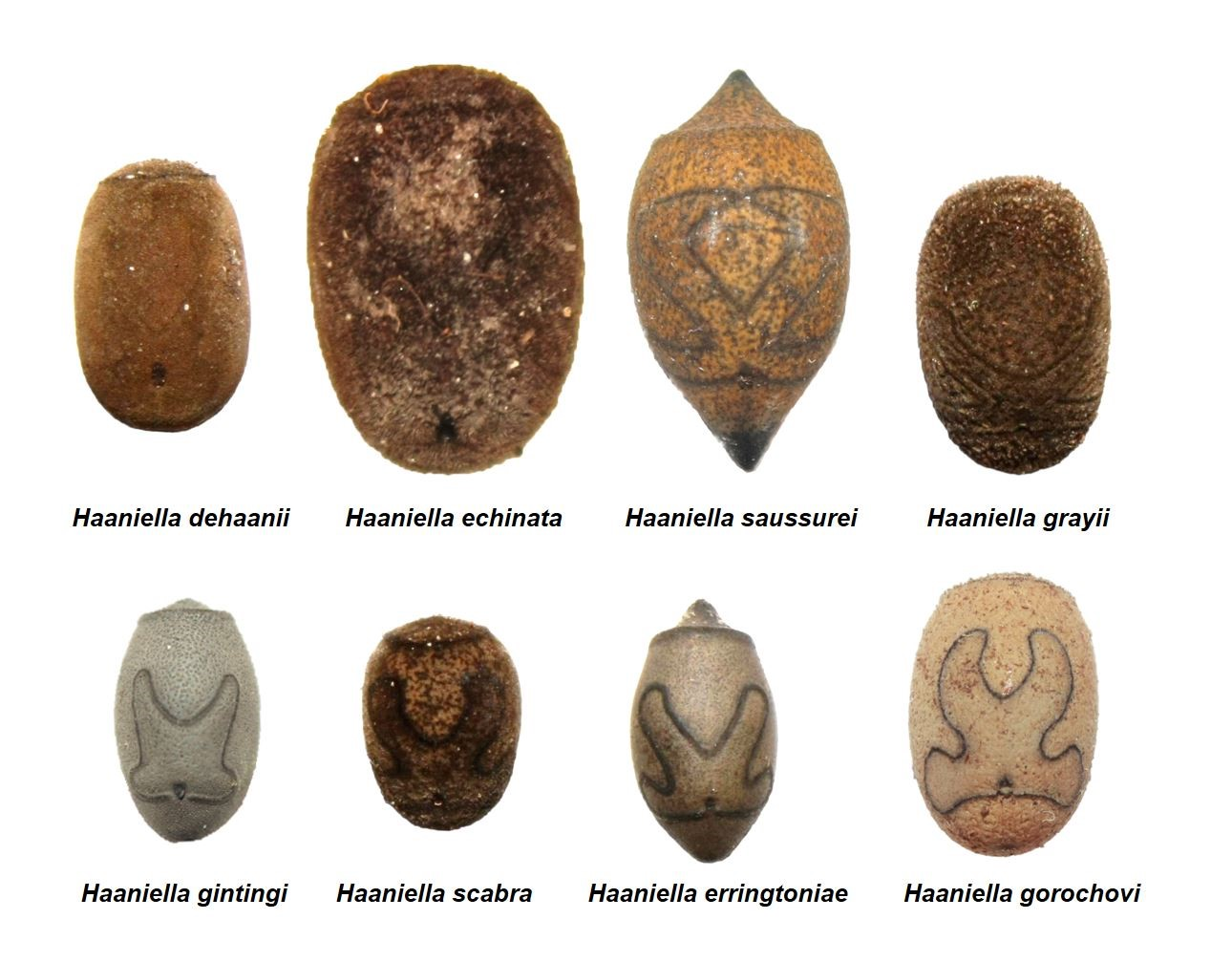
Eggs of eight Haaniella species

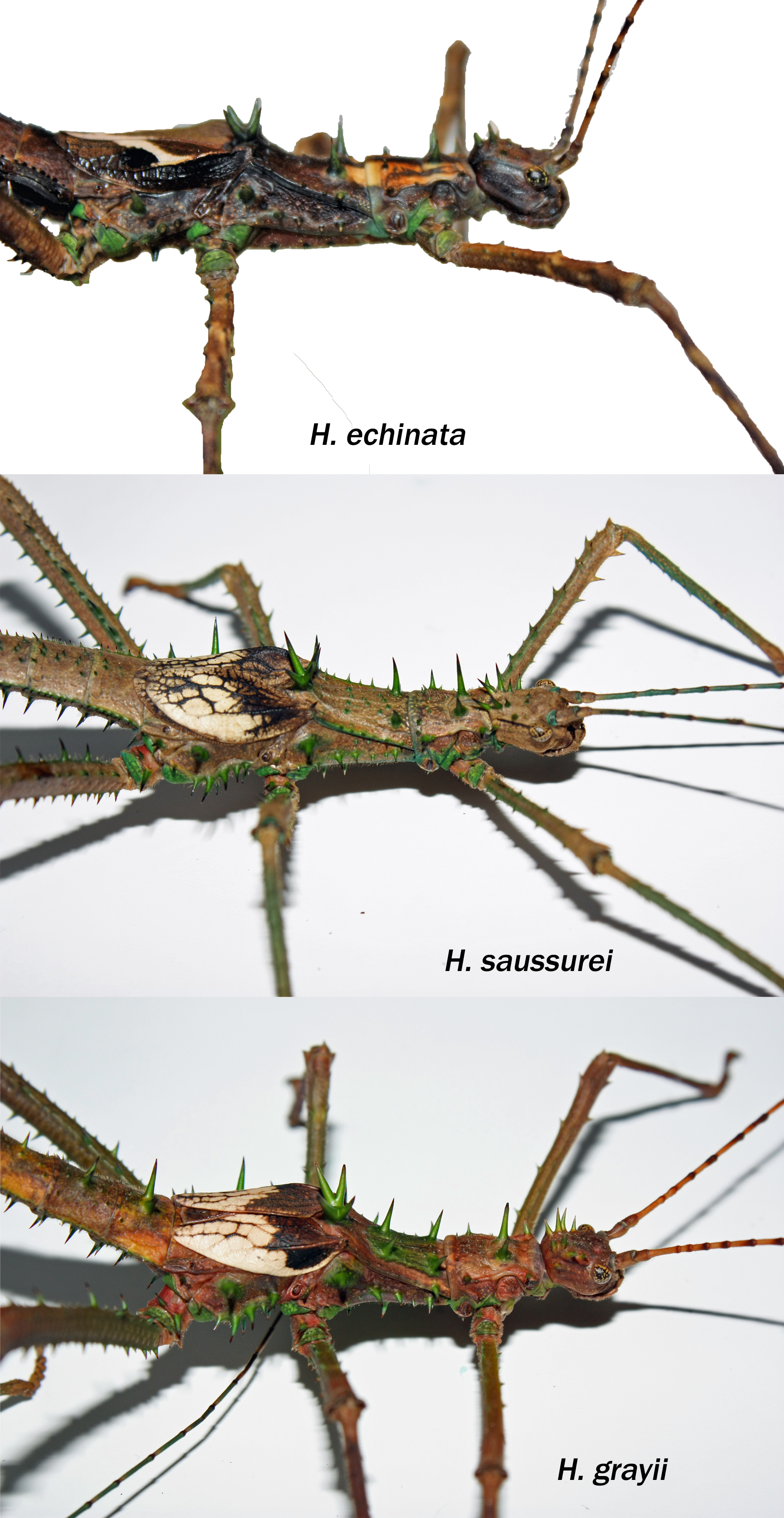
Characteristics of the thoracal spines in the males of H. echinata, H. saussurei and H. grayii in comparison

The females lay their relatively large eggs several centimeters deep in the ground using the ovipositor. With a length of up to 12 mm and a weight of almost 0.3 g, Haaniella echinata produces the largest known phasmid eggs. The eggs have a diagonal cross-shaped micropylar plate. In the lower angle of which the micropyle is located. In many species, the surface of the eggs is rough and bristled. The eggs of other species, on the other hand, are rather smooth and hairless. The nymphs hatch after 6 to 18 months, depending on the species and environmental conditions. Growing up to imago also takes 6 to 18 months, with some representatives like Haaniella erringtoniae being the species with the shortest known development time with six months to hatching and a further six months to imago. Many other Haaniella species not only take longer to develop, but also reach a significantly older age. Oskar V. Conle was able to document an age of more than five years in a female wild caught by Haaniella scabra.

== Taxonomy ==
Type species of the genus is Haaniella muelleri, more precisely its basionym Phasma muelleri. The genus was founded in 1904 by William Forsell Kirby in honor of the Dutch zoologist Wilhem de Haan who had described the type species. Kirby transferred a number of already described species from the genus Heteropteryx into this genus, which became monotypical.
For many decades Haaniella erringtoniae, Haaniella glaber, Haaniella mecheli and Haaniella rosenbergii have been used as synonyms considered to Haaniella muelleri. This synonymization was canceled through an extensive publication by Frank H. Hennemann et al from 2016, in which five more species were newly described. In addition, Haaniella parva transferred to the genus Miniopteryx in 2004 was transferred back to Haaniella, whereby Miniopteryx became a synonym for Haaniella. A classification into three species groups has been proposed for the genus. To the Echinata species group were assigned Haaniella echinata, Haaniella saussurei and Haaniella scabra from Borneo, to the Grayii species group Haaniella grayii and Haaniella dehaanii, as well as Haaniella gorochovi and Haaniella parva that do not occur in Borneo. All other species, all of which do not come from Borneo, were assigned to the Muelleri species group.
This classification could not be confirmed by a paper by Sarah Bank et al. published in 2021. To clarify the phylogeny of the Heteropterygidae four mitochondrial genes and three genes from the cell nucleus were examined. The result showed that the representatives of the Heteropterygini form a common clade, but the genus Heteropteryx is phylogenetically placed in the middle of several lines of species currently listed in Haaniella. Following this, either Haaniella would have to be split up into several genera or withdrawn in favor of the previously described genus Heteropteryx.
In 2018, Francis Seow-Choen described Haaniella parva muiengae, another subspecies to the nominate subspecies of Haaniella parva. In the same work he described with Haaniella azlini, a species that is very similar to Haaniella gintingi. Further subspecies described and revalidated Seow-Choen in 2020.

- - Haaniella saussurei
  - - - - Haaniella gorochovi
        - Haaniella gintingi
      - - Haaniella erringtoniae
        - - Heteropteryx sp. 'Khao Lak'
          - Heteropteryx dilatata
            = Heteropteryx dilatata 'Kuala Boh'
    - - - Haaniella scabra
        - Haaniella grayii
      - - Haaniella dehaanii
        - - - Haaniella echinata 'Similajau'
            - Haaniella echinata 'Mulu'
          - Haaniella echinata 'Brunei'
            = Haaniella echinata 'Tenom'
            = Haaniella echinata 'Kiansom'
            = Haaniella echinata 'Luyang'

Relationships of the examined Haaniella and Heteropteryx species by Sarah Bank et al (2021)

The following species and subspecies are counted under Haaniella:

- Haaniella aculeata Hennemann, Conle, Brock & Seow-Choen, 2016
  - Haaniella aculeata aculeata Hennemann, Conle, Brock & Seow-Choen, 2016
  - Haaniella aculeata longipennis Seow-Choen, 2020
- Haaniella azlini Seow-Choen, 2018
- Haaniella dehaanii (Westwood, 1859)
  (syn. = Heteropteryx dipsacus Redtenbacher, 1906)
- Haaniella echinata (Redtenbacher, 1906)
- Haaniella erringtoniae (Redtenbacher, 1906)
- Haaniella gintingi Hennemann, Conle, Brock & Seow-Choen, 2016
- Haaniella glaber (Redtenbacher, 1906)
  (syn. = Haaniella muelleri simplex Günther, 1944)
- Haaniella gorochovi Hennemann, Conle, Brock & Seow-Choen, 2016
- Haaniella grayii (Westwood, 1859)
  (syn. = Heteropteryx australe Kirby, 1896)
- Haaniella jacobsoni Günther, 1944
- Haaniella kerincia Hennemann, Conle, Brock, Seow-Choen & Gorochov, 2016
- Haaniella mecheli (Redtenbacher, 1906)
  - Haaniella mecheli mecheli (Redtenbacher, 1906)
  - Haaniella mecheli macroptera Hennemann, Conle, Brock & Seow-Choen, 2016
- Haaniella muelleri (de Haan, 1842)
- Haaniella parva Günther, 1944
  - Haaniella parva parva Günther, 1944
  - Haaniella parva muiengae Seow-Choen, 2020
- Haaniella rosenbergii (Kaup, 1871)
  - Haaniella rosenbergii rosenbergii (Kaup, 1871)
  - Haaniella rosenbergii novaeguineae Günther, 1930
  - Haaniella rosenbergii subulussalama Seow-Choen, 2020
- Haaniella saussurei Kirby, 1904
  (syn. = Haaniella echidna Rehn, J.W.H., 1938)
  (syn. = Heteropteryx grayi Saussure, 1869)
  (syn. = Heteropteryx saussurei Redtenbacher, 1906)
- Haaniella scabra (Redtenbacher, 1906)

== Human use ==
Some indigenous peoples on Borneo are known to eat the very large eggs of some Haaniella species. These are not only valued for their high protein content, but are also said to help against diarrhea when cooked.

From the genus Haaniella there are some species in breeding by the phasmid enthusiasts. The Phasmid Study Group has seven species in its culture list, the Dutch - Belgian Phasma workgroup eight species, some of them in several origin stocks. After Haaniella echinata (PSG number 26) was introduced as the first one in 1979, the other species native to Borneo followed. So in 1984 came Haaniella scabra (PSG number 70), in 1990 Haaniella grayii (PSG number 125) and Haaniella dehaanii (PSG number 126) and finally in 1994 Haaniella saussurei (PSG number 177) in the terrariums of European terrarieaner. Also in the early 1990s, Haaniella erringtoniae was introduced from the Malay Peninsula, first called Haaniella muelleri. Also Haaniella gintingi, which before it was described being called as Haaniella sp. 'Sibayak' was introduced in 2011 and was successfully bred by Bruno Kneubühler. In 2014 Haaniella gorochovi, first known as Haaniella sp. 'Bidoup Nui Ba' from Vietnam as the eighth species introduced to Europe and in breeding under PSG number 404.

The breeding of Haaniella species is generally considered to be a bit tricky due to its slow development. Although the insects accept most forage plants without any problems, they tend to have diarrhea in spring and early summer when feeding on leaves that are too fresh, which can lead to the total loss of entire breeding stocks. In addition, the long development time of the brittle and sometimes shock-sensitive eggs often leads to low hatching rates, since constant or optimal conditions for incubation must be guaranteed over a long period of time.

== Gallery ==
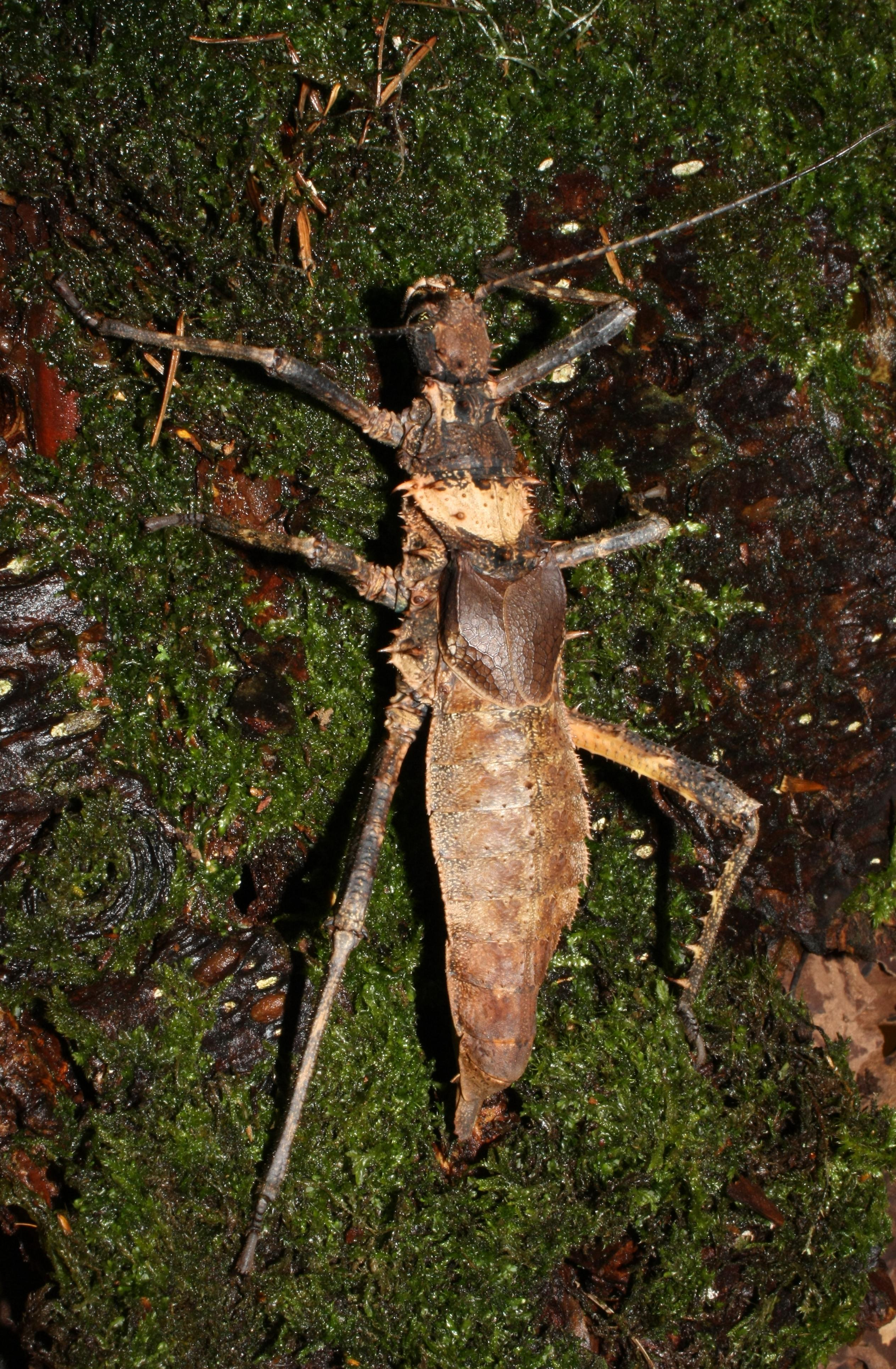
Haaniella dehaanii, fresh adult female

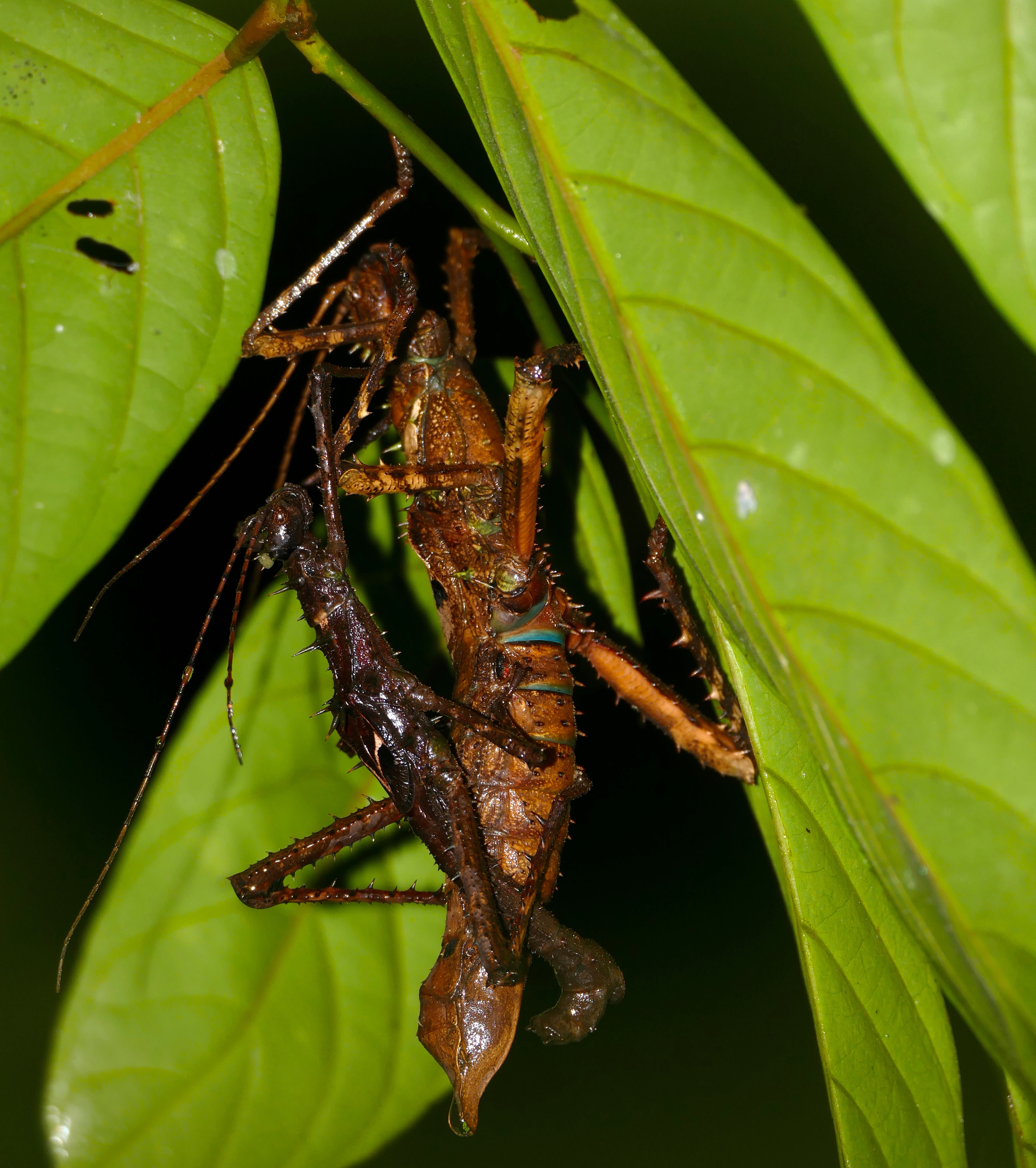
Haaniella echinata, pair

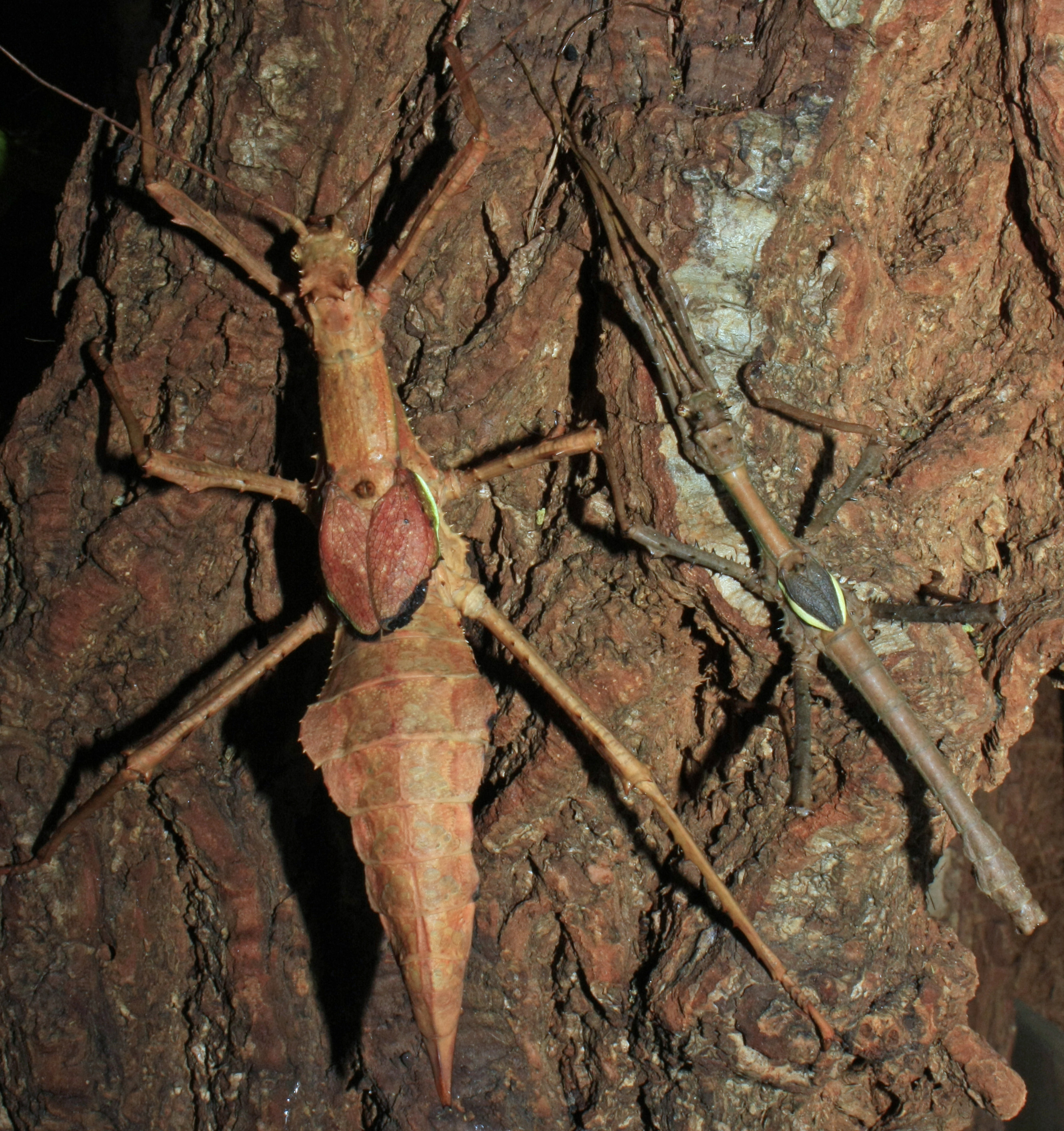
Haaniella gintingi 'Sibayak', pair

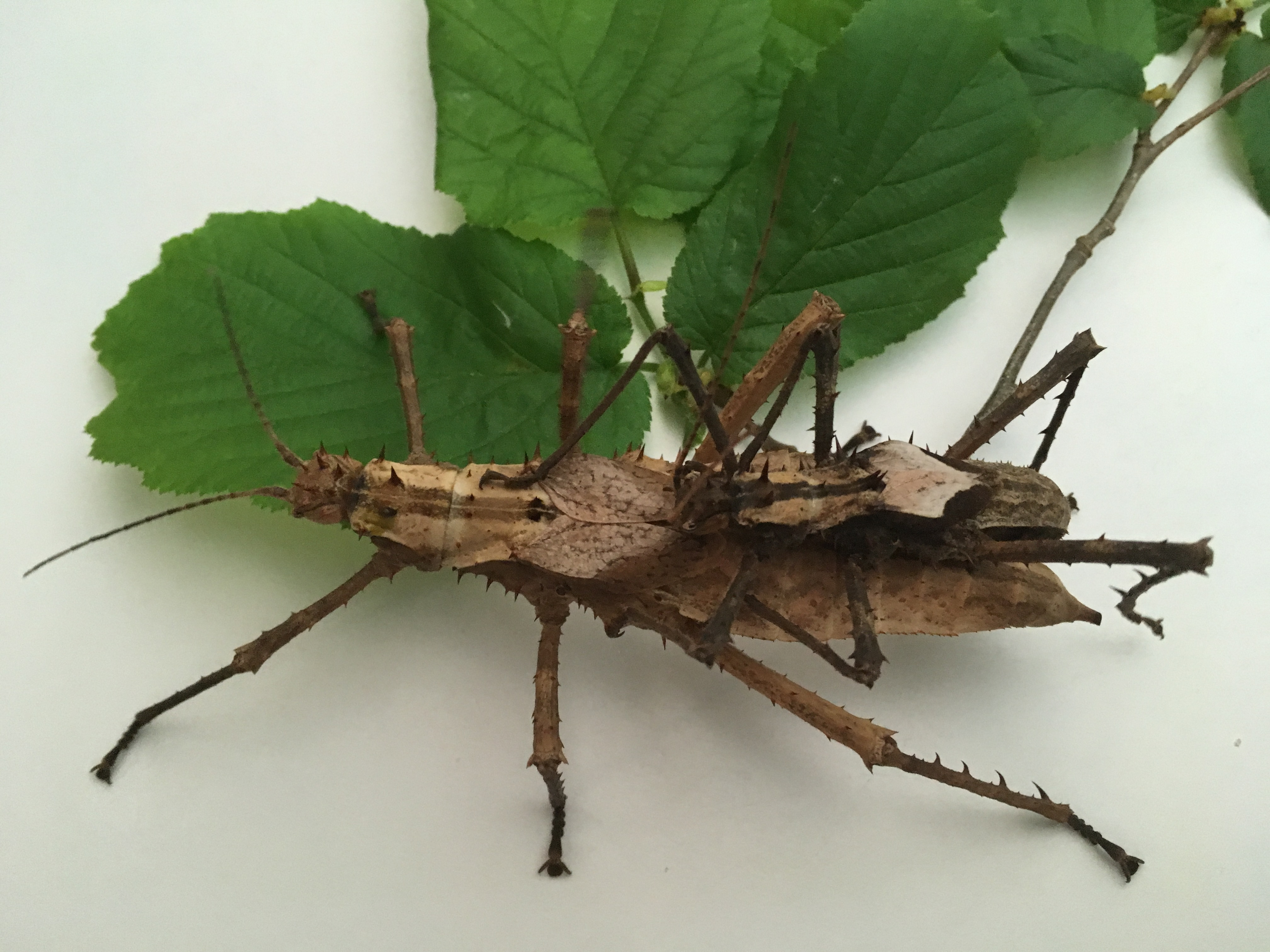
Haaniella gorochovi 'Bidoup Nui Ba', pair

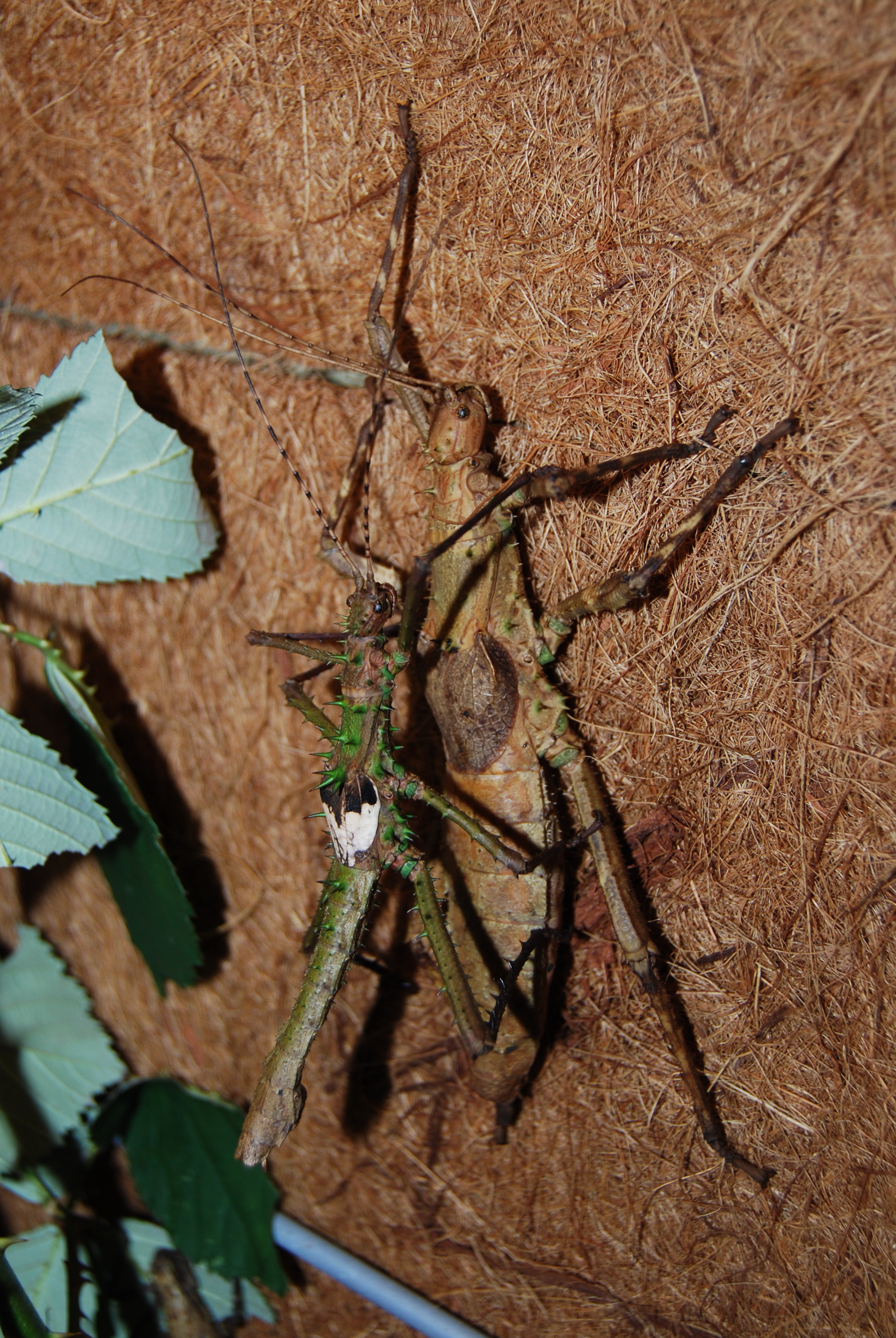
Haaniella grayii, pair

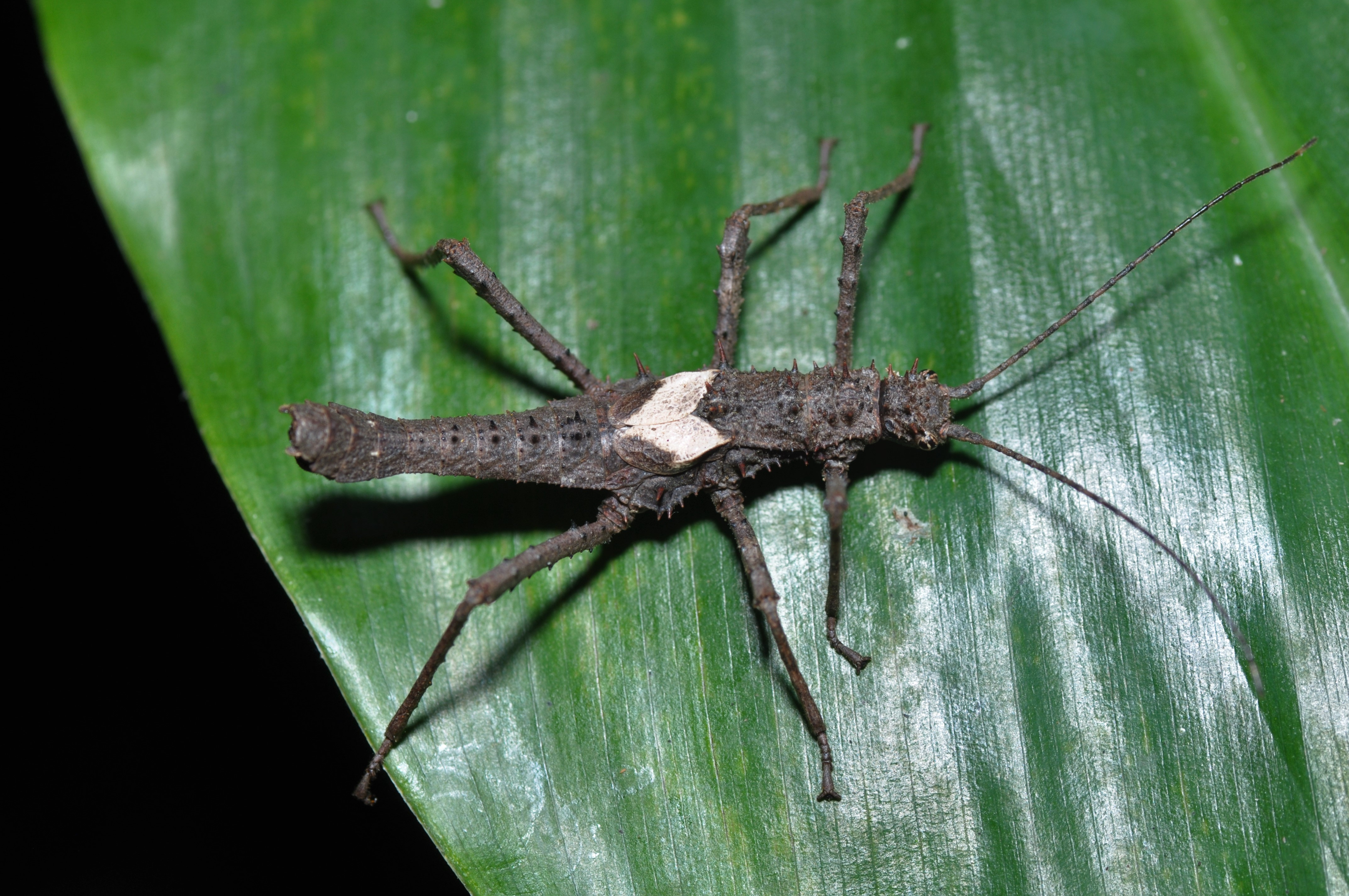
Haaniella parva, male

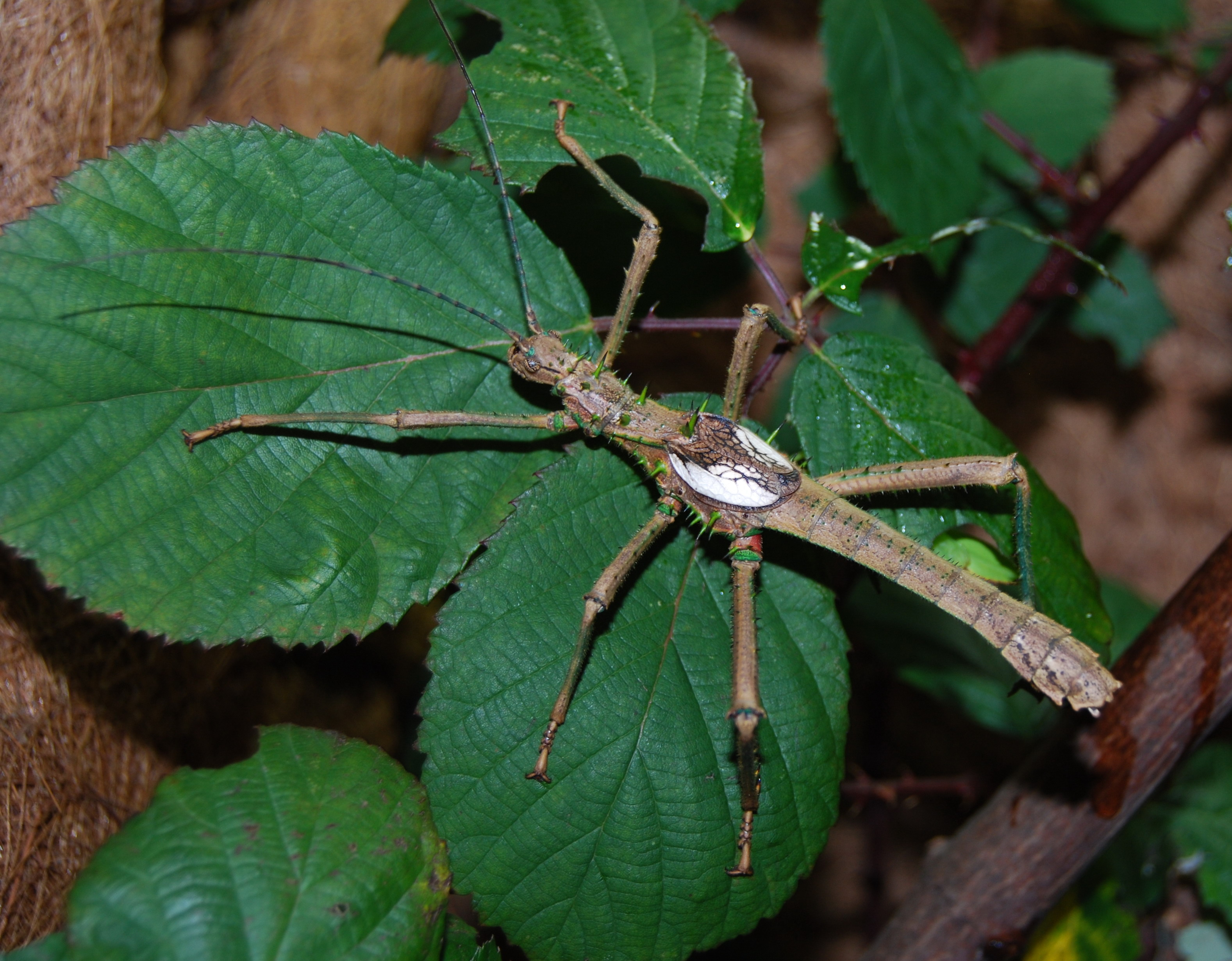
Haaniella saussurei, male

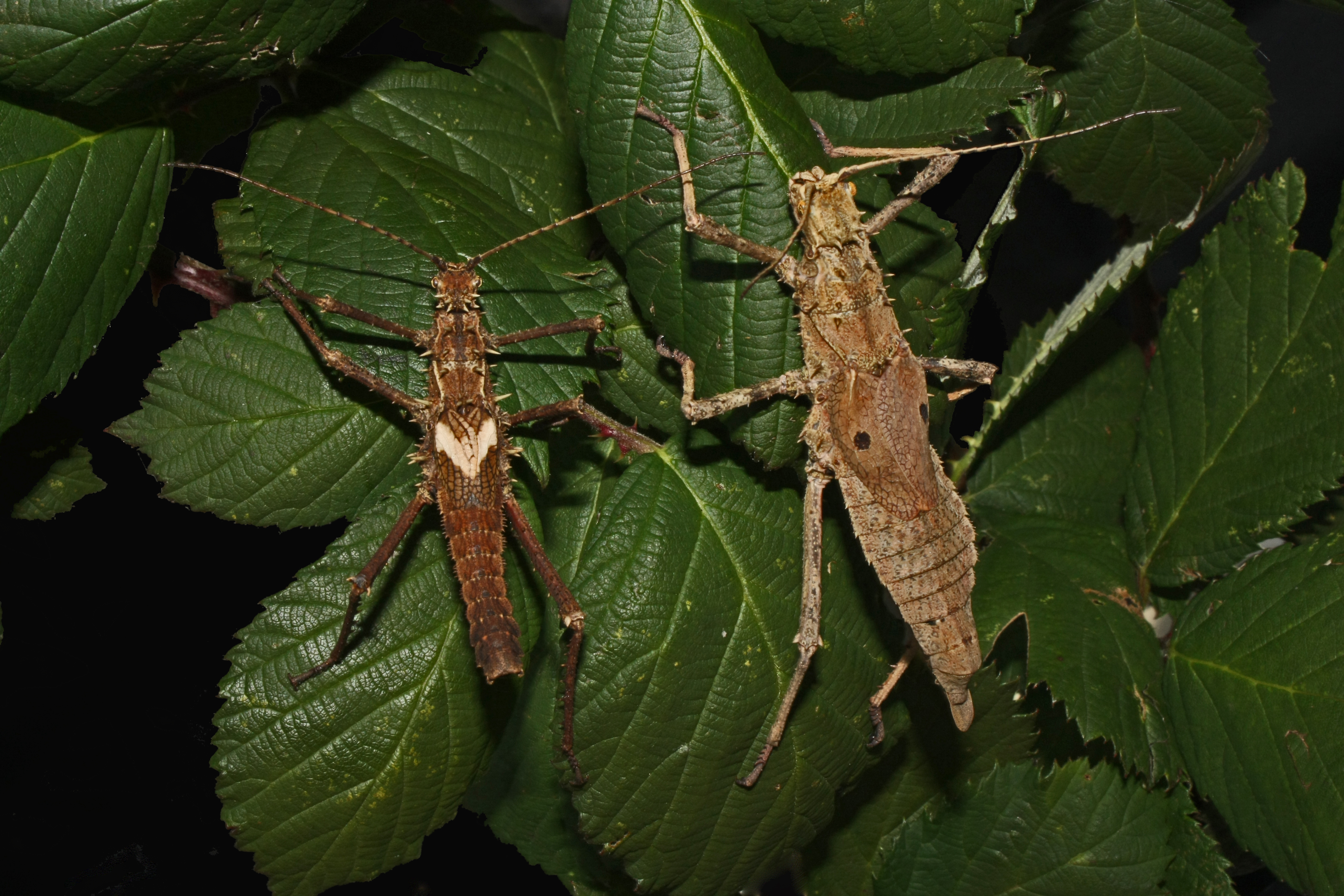
Haaniella scabra, pair
