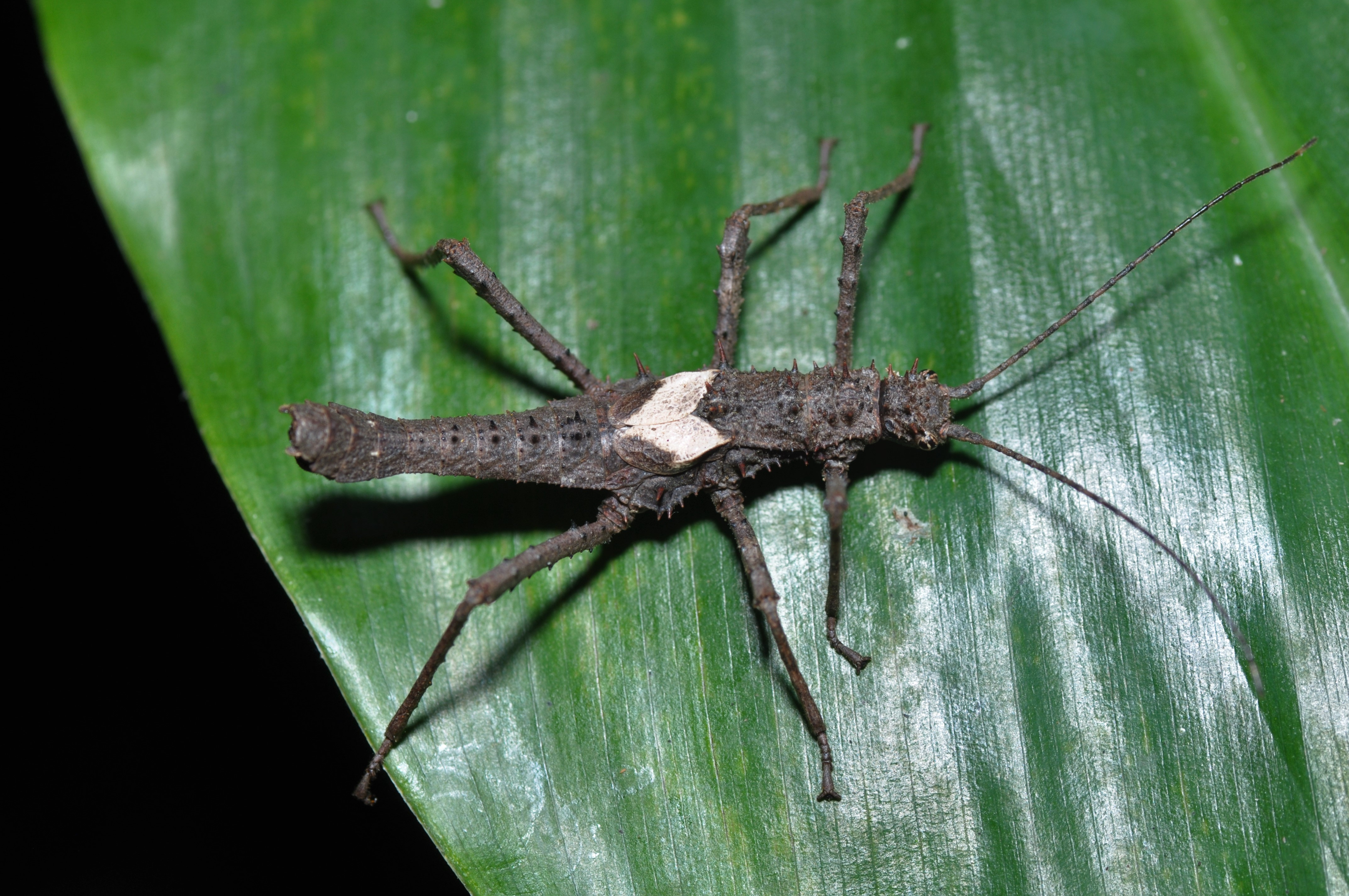
- Haaniella parva, male

Scientific classification
- Domain: Eukaryota
- Kingdom: Animalia
- Phylum: Arthropoda
- Class: Insecta
- Order: Phasmatodea
- Family: Heteropterygidae
- Subfamily: Heteropteryginae
- Tribe: Heteropterygini
- Genus: Haaniella
- Species: H. parva

Binomial name
- Haaniella parva Günther, 1944

Subspecies
- Haaniella parva parva; Haaniella parva muiengae

Synonyms
- Miniopteryx parva (Günther, 1944)

= Haaniella parva =

Species of stick insect

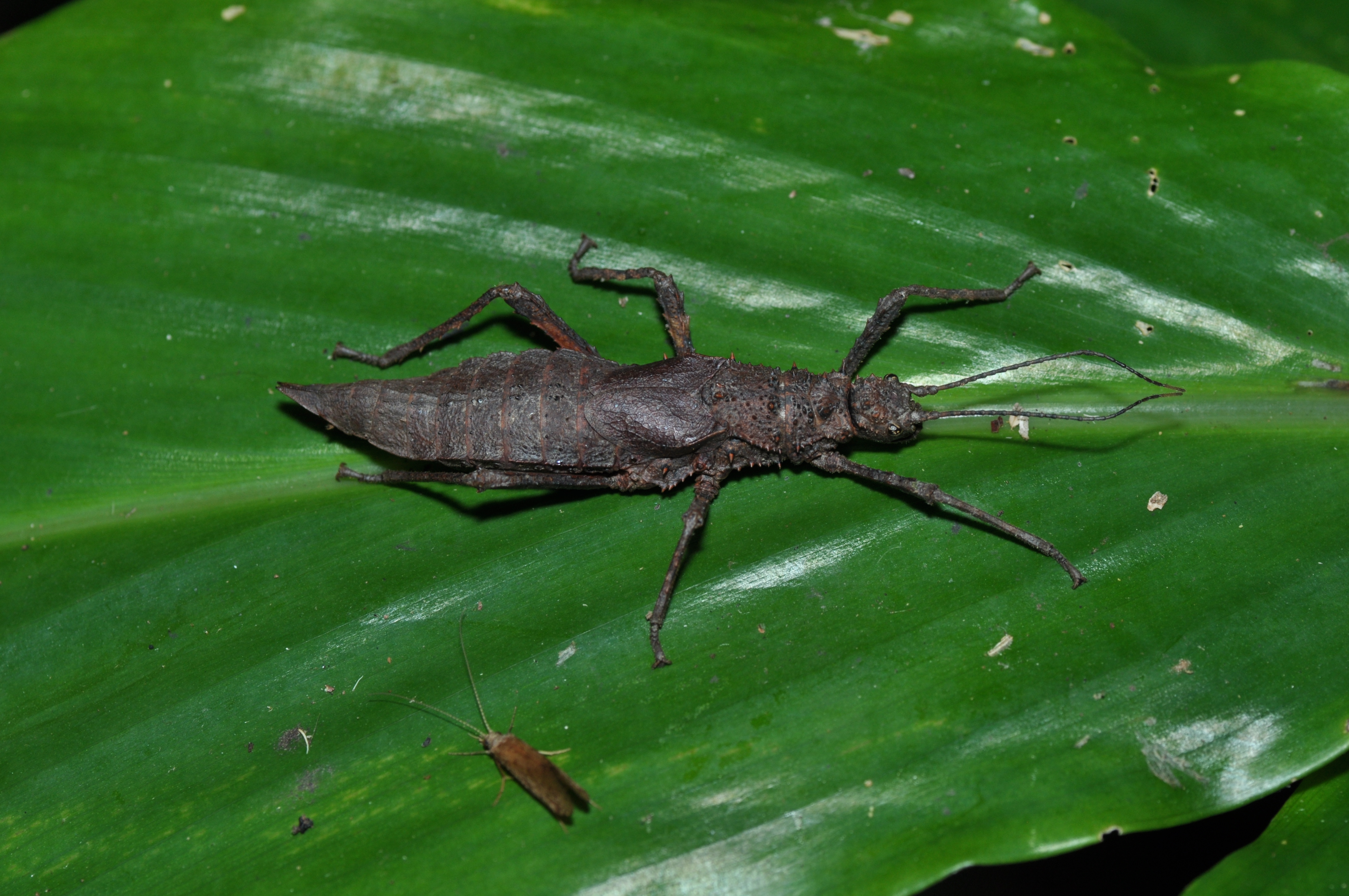
Haaniella parva, female

Haaniella parva is a species of stick insect from the subfamily Heteropteryginae and belongs to the representatives of the genus Haaniella native to Sumatra. It is their smallest representative.

== Description ==
Haaniella parva is the smallest species of the genus and thus also of the entire subfamily of Heteropteryginae. It has only a few spines and belongs to the species with greatly shortened wings in both sexes. The forewings, which are formed as tegmina, completely cover the short hindwings. The latter are transformed into stridulation organs and the sound they produce is used to ward off enemies.

The females are usually relatively uniformly colored light to dark brown or almost black, but can also have light patterns on the thorax and abdomen. The nominate subspecies reaches a length of 45 to 52 millimetres (1.8 to 2.0 in). They have eight distinct spikes on their heads. These are almost equally sized, conical anterior and posterior coronals on the crown, two similarly sized, blunt lateral coronals on the posterior margin of the head, and prominent supraorbitals behind the eyes. The antennas consist of 24 segments. The pro- and mesothorax widens in a slightly trapezoidal shape backwards, with the clearly separated mesonotum tapering backwards. The side edges of the pro- and mesonotum are covered with bumps or short conical spines. The pro- and mesonatal spines are only slightly developed. Most conspicuous are the conical premedian pronotals on an elevation located in front of the middle of the pronotum and located transversely to the body axis (sulcus medianus transversum). Mesopleura and metapleura with four or five smaller spines and a strong and comparatively slender supracoxale. All larger spines are light to reddish brown. On segments three to five of the abdomen are one to three pairs of small, conical central spines. These are situated on two barely recognizable crests running along the middle of the abdomen, which only merge into one in the area of the last abdominal segment. The upper portion of the secondary ovipositor, the epiproct, is bifurcated at the apex with a fairly deep triangular incision. It clearly overhangs the lower subgenital plate.

Males are 25 to 37 millimetres (0.98 to 1.46 in) long. The spines are similar to those of the females, with the larger spines on the head and thorax in particular being significantly longer and more pointed. Striking are the paired, distinctive pairs of spines on the second to fifth abdominal segment. The tegmina are usually colored white in the front part. This coloring can cover up to three quarters of the wing surface.

The subspecies Haaniella parva muiengae is slightly larger with 50 to 54 millimetres (2.0 to 2.1 in) in females and 36 to 41 millimetres (1.4 to 1.6 in) in males. It differs from the nominate subspecies by a more horizontally arranged head, which in Haaniella parva parva tends to slope towards the base of the antennae and rise towards the apex. In addition, in the females of Haaniella parva muiengae, the anterior, mesal, and posteromedial mesonatal spines are merely blunt tubercles. The males have more angular lobe-shaped extensions at the rear edge of the abdominal segment, while these are more rounded in Haaniella parva parva.

== Distribution area and reproduction ==
The species occurs in north-eastern Sumatra, where it is the most common representative of the genus Haaniella. The nominate subspecies occurs in the Indonesian provinces of Aceh and North Sumatra, making it sympatric and partly syntopic with Haaniella gintingi. It was found there up to an altitude of 1,200 metres (3,900 ft). The subspecies Haaniella parva muiengae has only been collected from gardens of Kedah Village near Mount Angkasan in Aceh Province.

The females lay the sparsely hairy, barrel-shaped eggs in the ground using their ovipositor. These are 5.5 millimetres (0.22 in) long, 3.8 millimetres (0.15 in) high and about 3.2 millimetres (0.13 in) wide. They differ from the eggs of the other Haaniella species by the unusual micropylar plate. Its four arms have merged into an almost rectangular shape with rounded corners. It is slightly widened at the bottom and also more rounded here. The micropyle is centered at the lower edge.

== Taxonomy ==
Klaus Günther described Haaniella parva using two males, then considered syntypes, which Dr. Volz have been collected from the Kwalu River in north-eastern Sumatra. Of these, the specimen deposited in the State Museum of Zoology, Dresden was later selected as the lectotype. According to Günther, the specimen that remained in the Zoological Museum Hamburg thus becomes a paralectotype, but various authors could not find it there. The species name is derived from the Latin "parvus" and refers to the small size of the species (lat. parvus = small). Oliver Zompro established the genus Miniopteryx for Haaniella parva in 2004. He justifies this with the small size of the species and the indentations located on the second to sixth sternite of the abdomen, which do not occur in any of the other Heteropteryginae species examined. Frank H. Hennemann et al. transferred the species back to the genus Haaniella in 2016 and thus synonymized the genus Miniopteryx, which had been monotypic until then. They also divided the genus Haaniella into three species groups. Haaniella gorochovi, which originates from Vietnam, is assumed to be the sister species of Haaniella parva. Both have been assigned to the "grayii" species group along with Haaniella grayii and Haaniella dehaanii, native to Borneo. This assignment could not be confirmed with regard to the species originating from Borneo by a molecular genetic study from 2021, since Haaniella gorochovi is not as closely related to these species as suspected. Haaniella parva could not be included in the study due to a lack of material.

In 2018, Francis Seow-Choen described Haaniella parva muiengae as a subspecies of Haaniella parva. It is named after Choo Mui Eng, who, among others, accompanied Seow-Choen on his photo trip to the gardens of Kedah Village, where the subspecies was found. The female holotype is deposited together with a male and a female paratype in the Bogor Zoology Museum in Bogor, Indonesia. Three other paratypes can be found in the Lee Kong Chian Natural History Museum at the National University of Singapore. All types of this subspecies were collected in July 2017.
