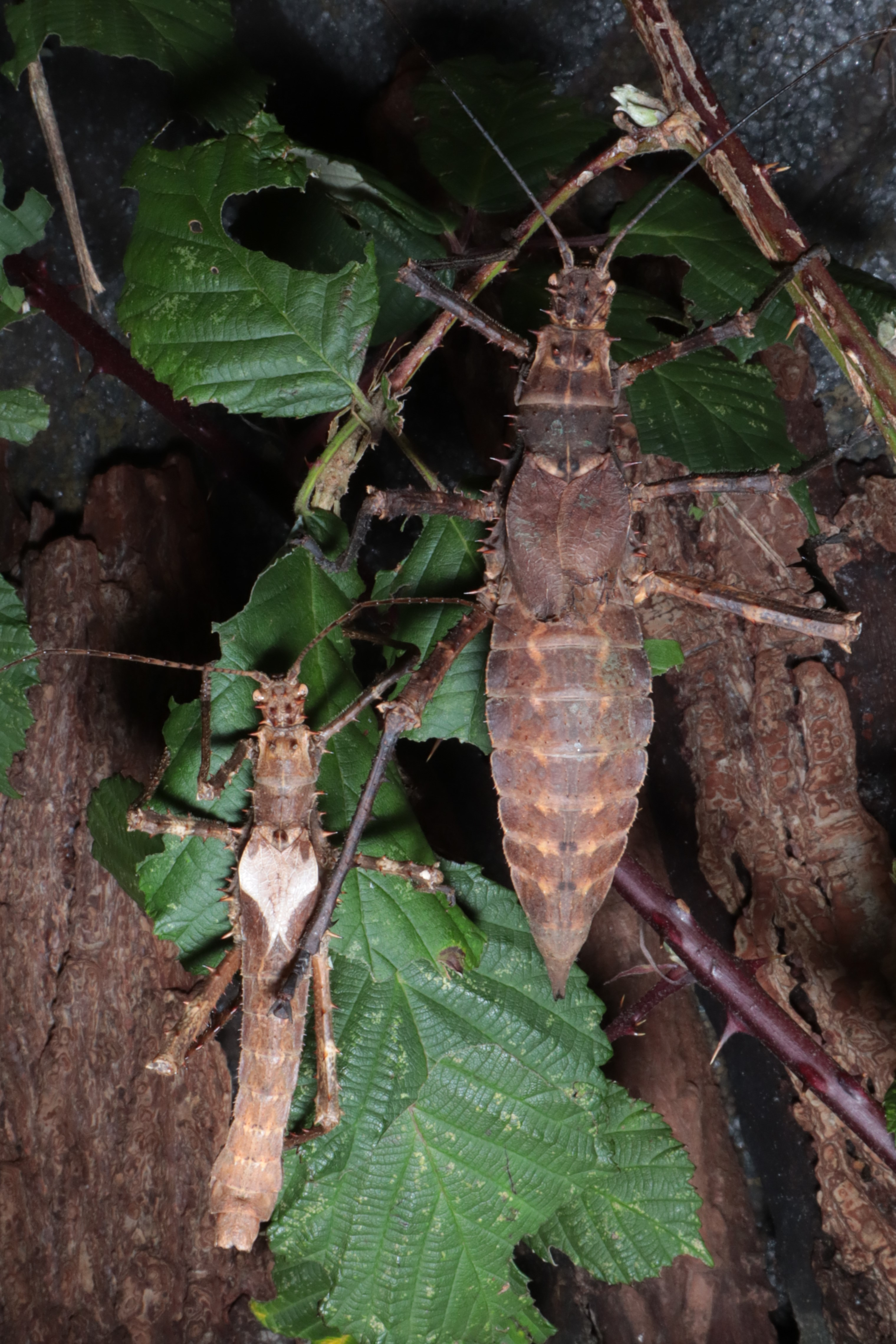
- Haaniella gorochovi, pair

Scientific classification
- Kingdom: Animalia
- Phylum: Arthropoda
- Class: Insecta
- Order: Phasmatodea
- Family: Heteropterygidae
- Subfamily: Heteropteryginae
- Tribe: Heteropterygini
- Genus: Haaniella
- Species: H. gorochovi

Binomial name
- Haaniella gorochovi Hennenmann, Conle, Brock & Seow-Choen, 2016

= Haaniella gorochovi =

Species of stick insect

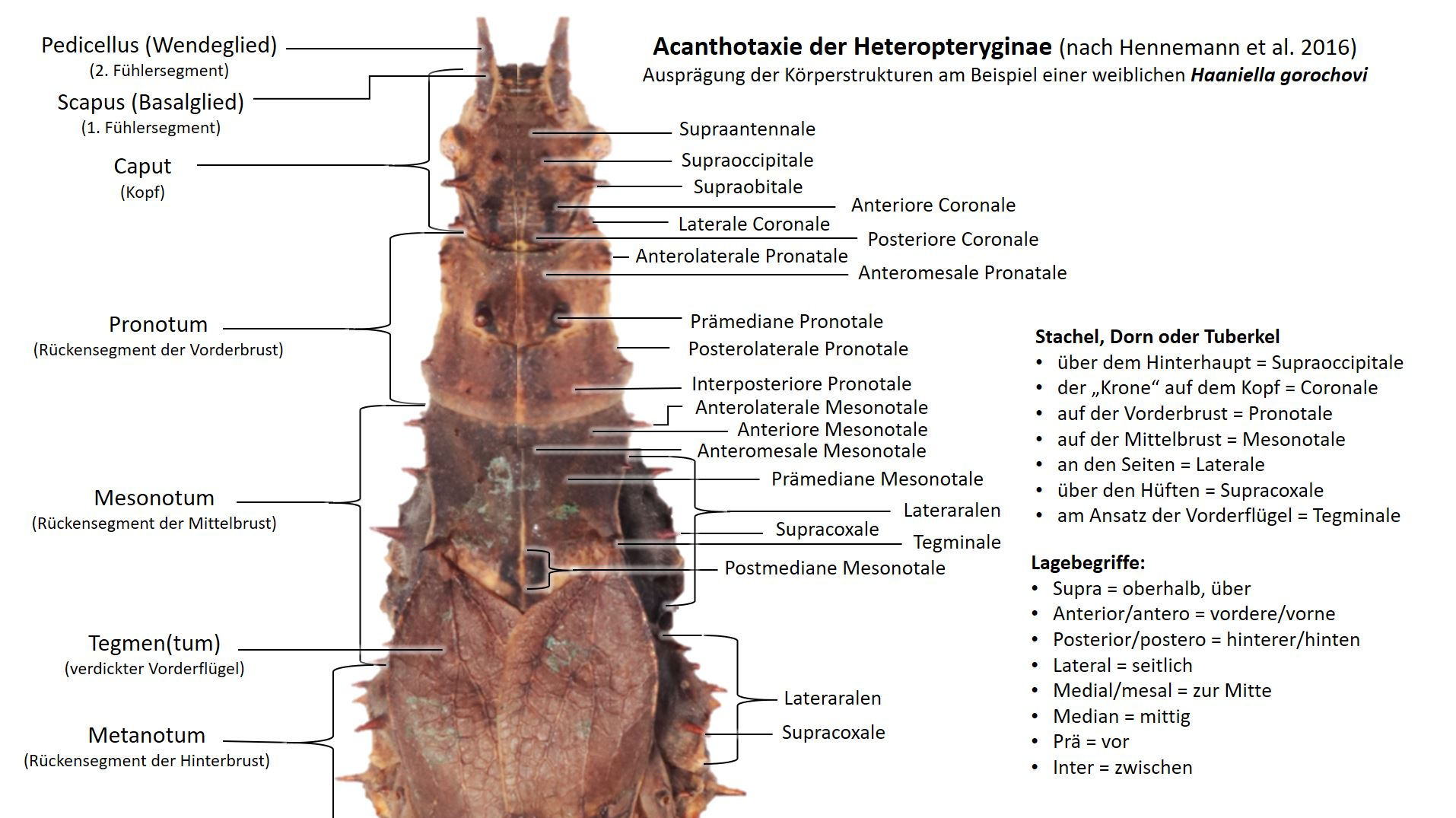
Spine expression (acanthotaxy) in a female of Haaniella gorochovi

Haaniella gorochovi is a stick insect species from Vietnam. It is a typical representative of the subfamily Heteropteryginae. The occasionally used common name Gorochov's Haaniella refers to the species name.

== Description ==
Haaniella gorochovi is a medium-sized, relatively compact Haaniella species. The spectrum of its basic colors ranges from matt ocher to dark brown. The insects get darker with age. Both light and dark spots can occur. Occasionally a longitudinal stripe is found, which in the females is rather dull brown and runs centrally along the body surface to the end of the abdomen, while in the males it is mainly on the pro- and mesonotum is rather dark brown. The well-developed thorns on the head and on the thorax are red and black at the tips. At the base of the tegmina there are not four, as in many other species, but only two striking posteromedian mesonotals (see also acanthotaxy of Heteropterygini). The intermediate membranes of the first three abdominal segments are pale orange. The females reach a size of 90 to 101 millimetres (3.5 to 4.0 in). Their abdomen ends in a secondary ovipositor. Its ventral lying subgenital plate ends in a slightly forked tip. Lateral teeth are absent. The dorsal part of the ovipositor, which is called the supraanal plate or epiproct, is slightly longer than the ventral part and ends in a two-pronged point. The males are 59 to 61 millimetres (2.3 to 2.4 in) long.

== Distribution area ==
The species is so far the only one of the genus that occurs on the continental mainland Asia. It is widespread in the highlands of Vietnam, where it was found in the provinces Gia Lai, Lâm Đồng, Khánh Hòa and Đắk Lắk. In Đắk Lắk it was found at altitude around 950 metres (3,120 ft).

== Reproduction ==
The eggs are pale gray or pale to medium brown, depending on where they were found. They are 7.5 to 7.8 millimetres (0.30 to 0.31 in) long, 5.5 to 6.0 millimetres (0.22 to 0.24 in) wide and 5.9 to 6.2 millimetres (0.23 to 0.24 in) high and have a clearly four-armed micropylar plate, the lower arms of which diverge almost horizontally. The lid (operculum) is raised slightly conically. The micropyle is at the bottom between these arms. A year can pass before hatching. The newly hatched nymphs are gray-brown in color and have conspicuous white bands on all femurs and a white spot on the fourth abdominal tergites . After about one to two years they are adult.

== Taxonomy ==
Frank H. Hennemann et al. described the species in 2016 on the basis of various animals, some of which were collected in the 1980s and 1990s. The specific name was chosen in honor of the Russian entomologist Andrey Vasilevich Gorochov, who had been collecting this species again and again since 1988. An adult male, which was collected in 1993 by Gorochov in Buôn Luoi in the province of Gia Lai, has been selected as holotype. It is stored alongside various paratypes in the Zoological Institute of the Russian Academy of Sciences in Saint Petersburg. Sarah Bank et al. included the species in their investigations based on genetic analysis. Of the species examined, Haaniella gintingi turned out to be the closest relative.

== In terraristics ==
Haniella gorochovi has been in breeding since 2014. The breeding stock goes back to specimens that Joachim Bresseel and Jérôme Constant were collected in July 2014 in the Bidoup Nui Ba National Park in the province of Lâm Đồng. Until it was described, it was referred to as Haaniella sp. ‘Bidoup Nui Ba’ according to where it was found. It is managed by the Phasmid Study Group under PSG number 404.

The species, like all members of the genus, need a relatively high level of humidity. A slightly moist substrate on the ground is necessary to lay eggs. In addition to bramble leaves or those of other Rosaceae as well as of hazel are eaten. In addition, there should be hiding places in the form of pieces of bark.

== Gallery ==
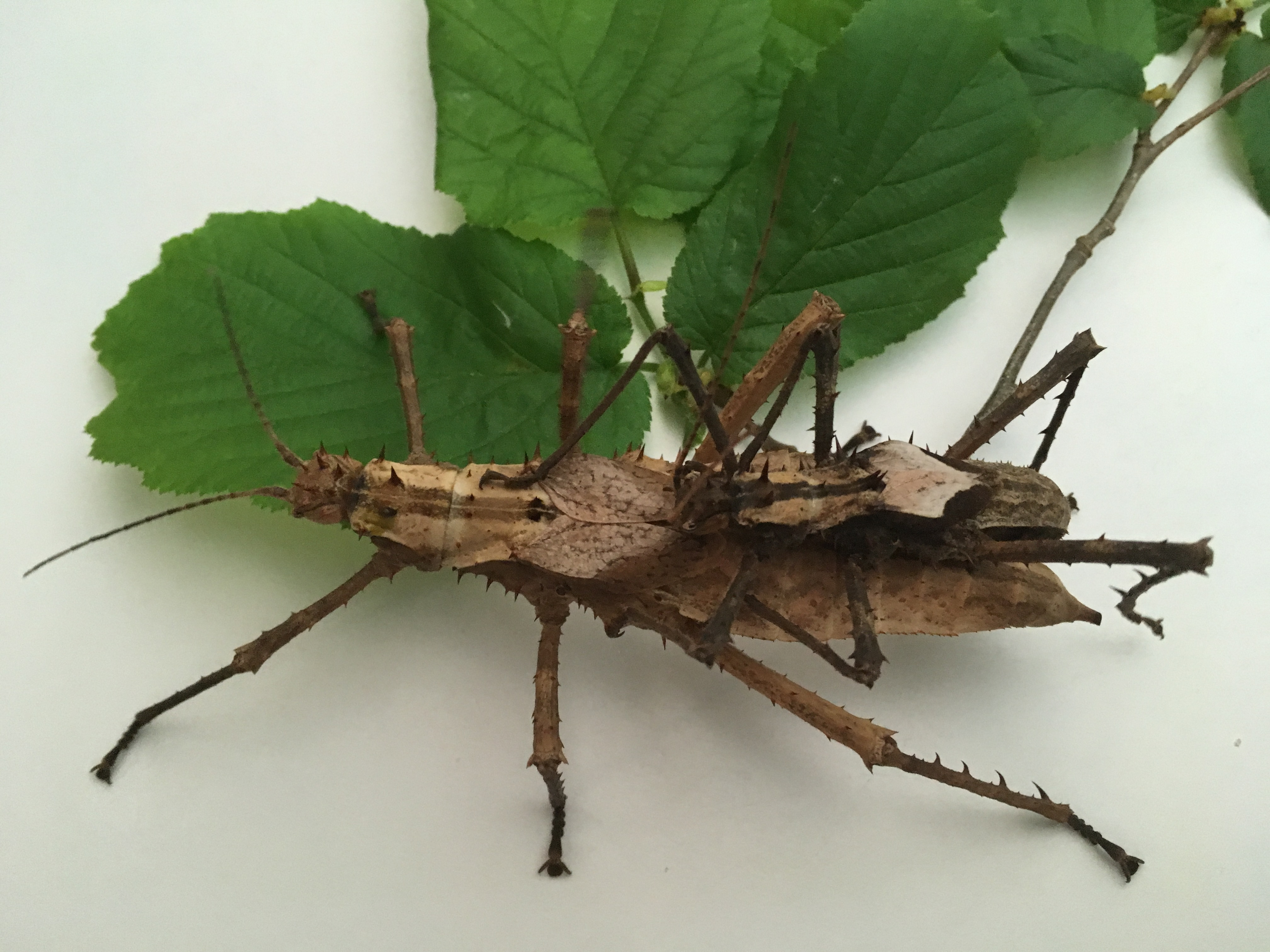
Couple at mating

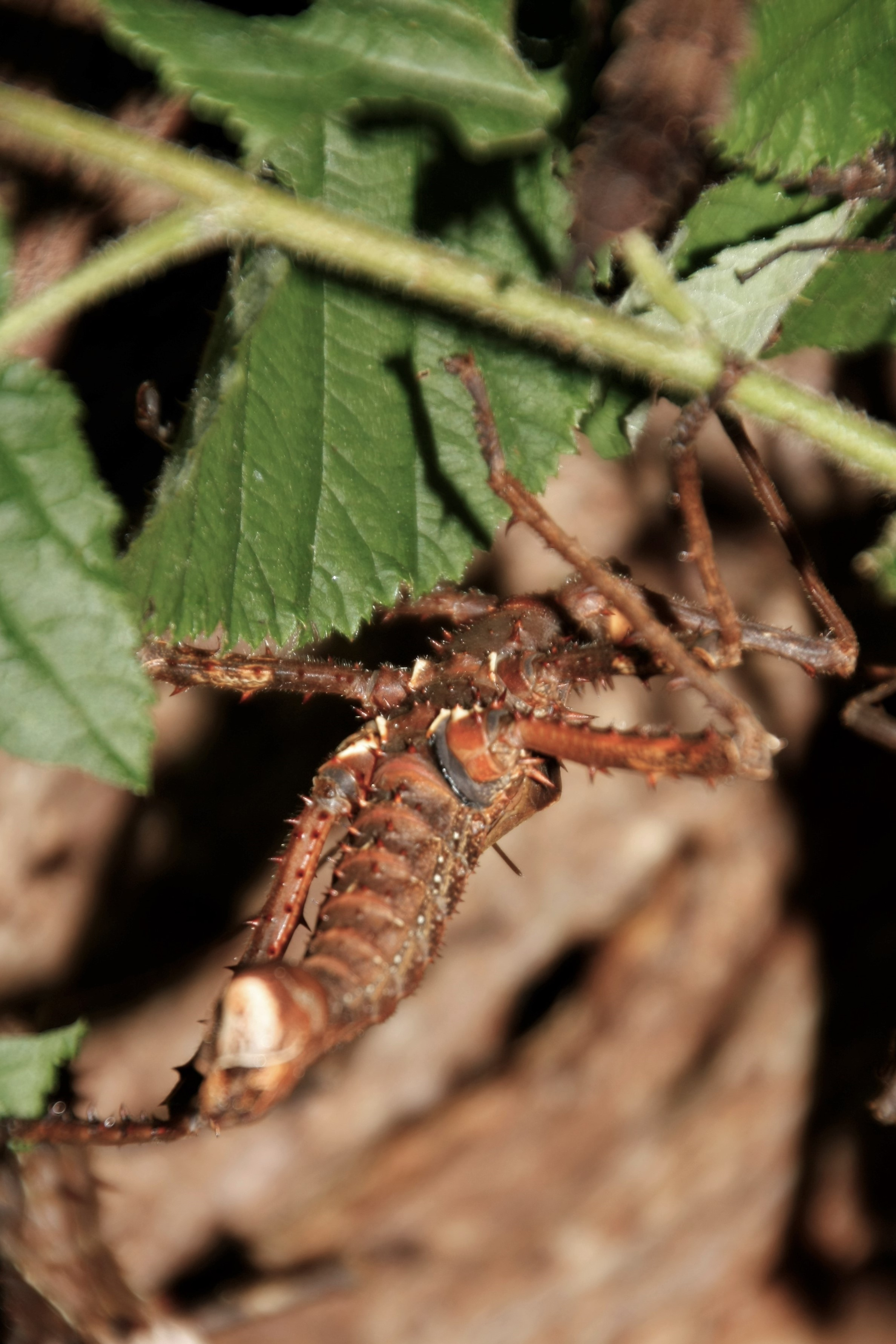
Male from below with a view of the coxae and the abdominal intermediate membranes

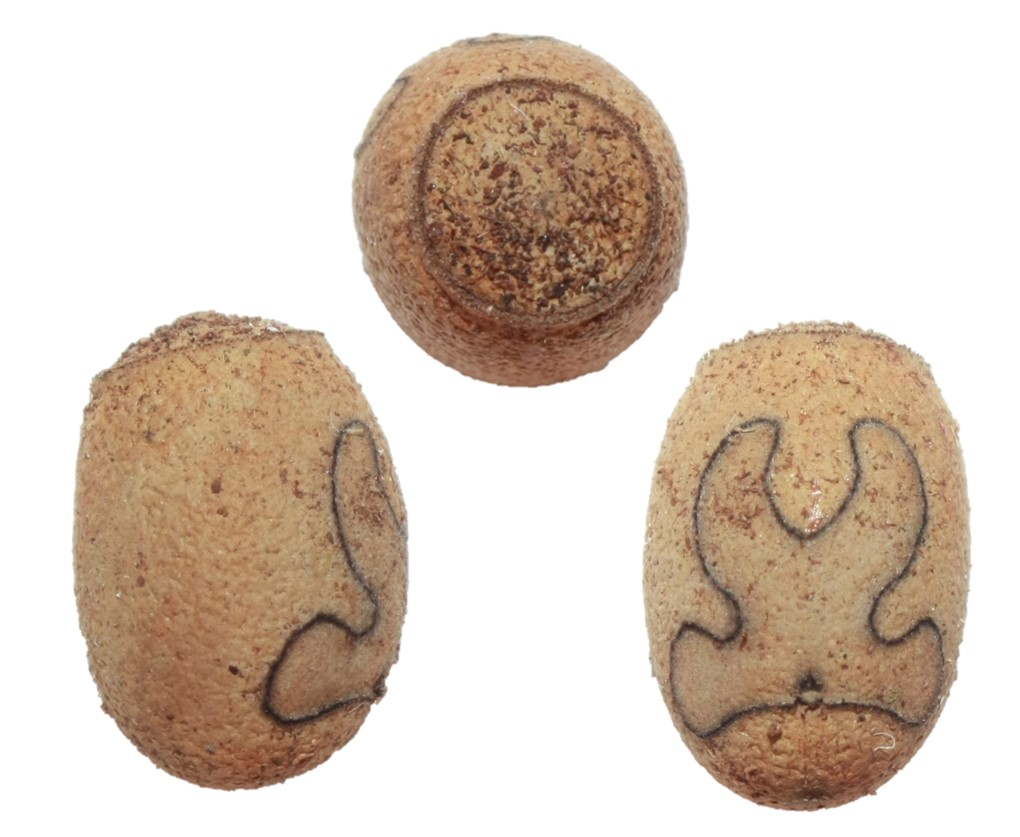
Eggs from above, sagittal and dorsal

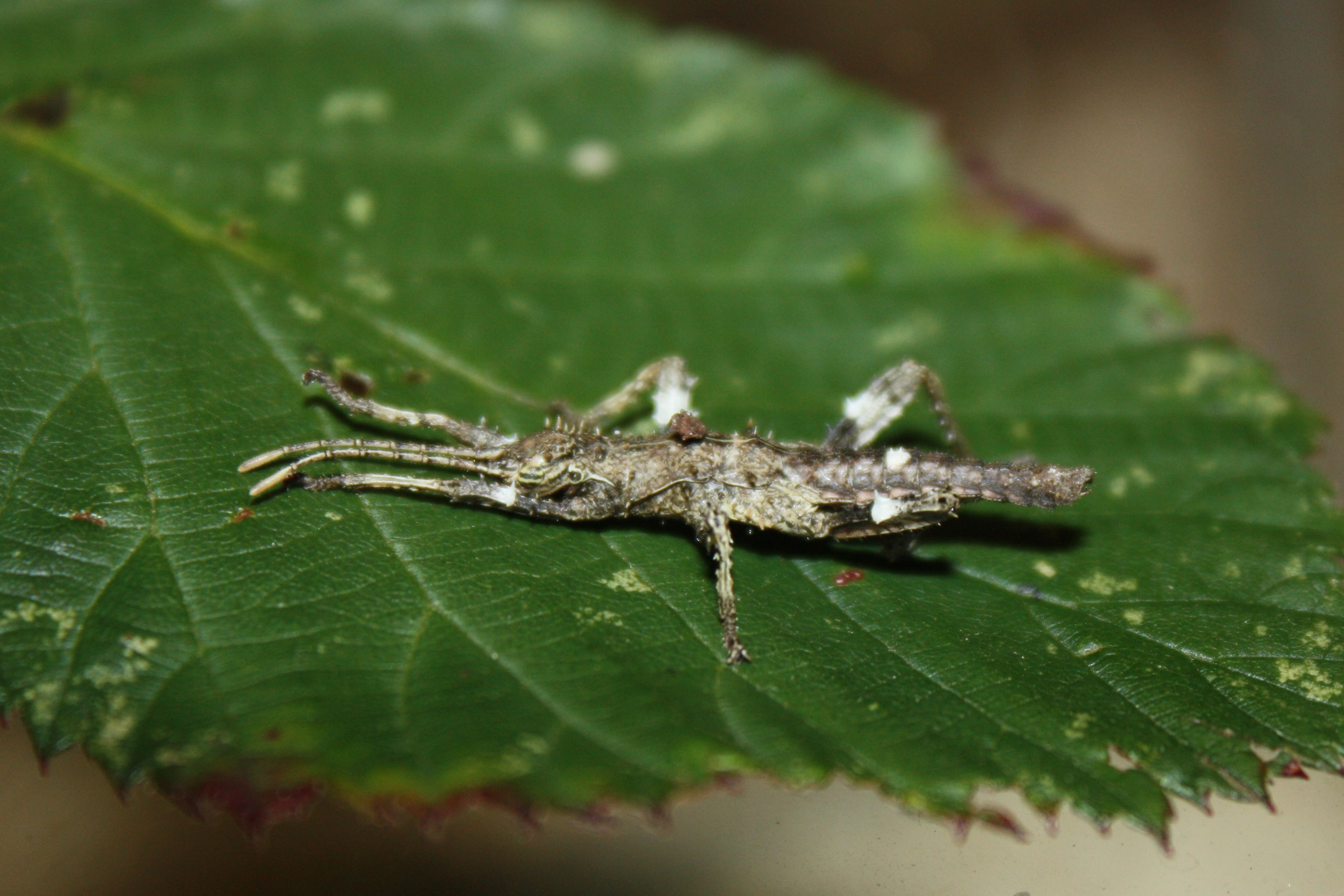
Newly hatched nymph
