= Micropyle (zoology) =

A micropyle is a pore in the membrane covering the ovum, through which a sperm enters. Micropyles are also found in sporozoites of some digenetic microorganisms such as Plasmodium at the anterior part of the cell that ultimately leads towards the apical cap. Examples of other organisms that have micropyles are the Bombyx mandarina and the Ceratitis capitata.
