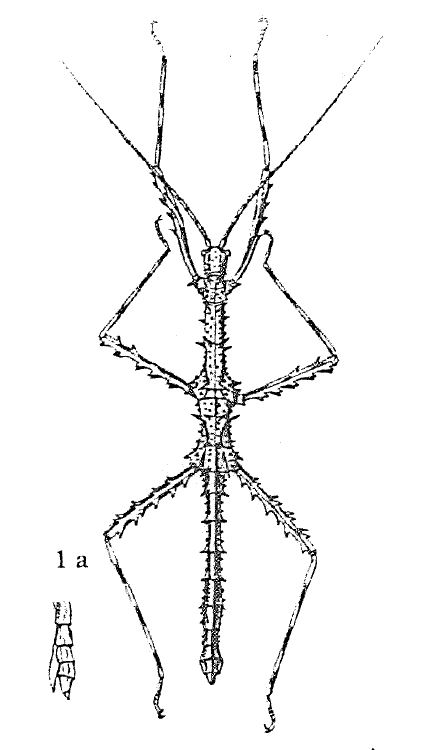
- Stenobrimus bolivari, Drawing of a female from the original description by Redtenbacher 1906

Scientific classification
- Kingdom: Animalia
- Phylum: Arthropoda
- Class: Insecta
- Order: Phasmatodea
- Superfamily: Bacilloidea
- Family: Heteropterygidae
- Subfamily: Obriminae
- Tribe: Obrimini
- Genus: Stenobrimus; Redtenbacher, 1906

Type species
- Stenobrimus bolivari Redtenbacher, 1906

Species
- Stenobrimus bolivari; Stenobrimus lumad; Stenobrimus pilipinus; Stenobrimus tagalog

= Stenobrimus =

Genus of stick insects

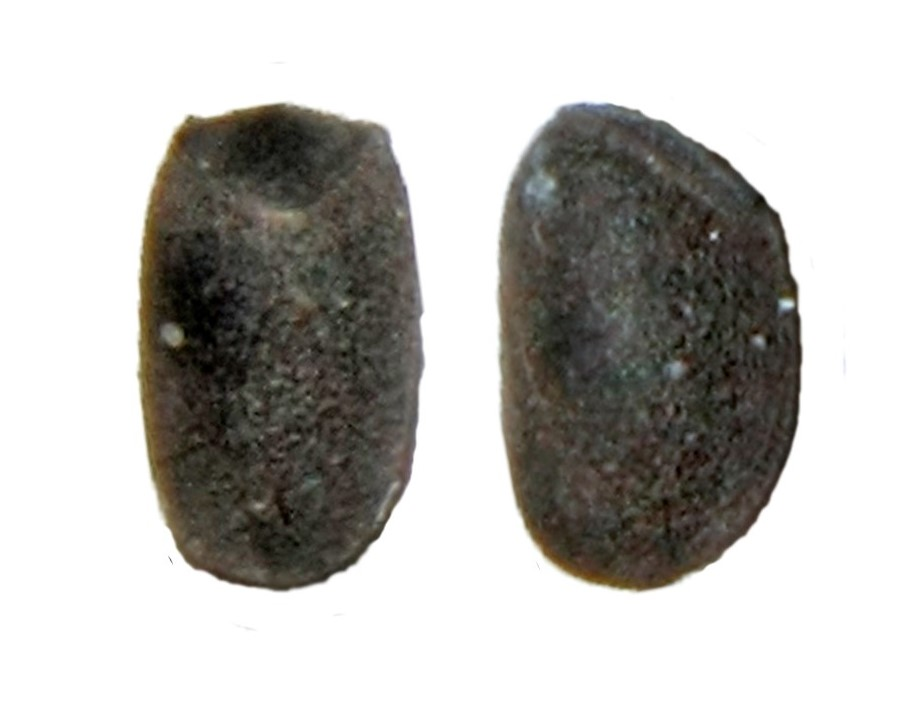
Eggs of Stenobrimus bolivari

Stenobrimus is a genus of medium-sized stick insects native to the Philippines.

== Characteristics ==
The representatives of this genus are much slimmer and longer-legged than all other representatives of the Obriminae and correspond more to the typical habitus of stick insects. Depending on the species, spines are distributed at more or less regular intervals over the entire body and femurs. On the thorax and abdomen they are arranged in pairs or rings of four. The 4.5 to 5.8 centimetres (1.8 to 2.3 in) long males are relatively simply colored. The females are 5.5 to 6.0 centimetres (2.2 to 2.4 in) in size. They are downright colorful compared to males, depending on the species, and may have triangle or diamond patterns of green, light and dark brown colors on the thorax and anterior abdomen. The legs can also be banded with green and brown.

== Distribution area ==
The species of this genus are native to various Philippine islands. Stenobrimus bolivari occurs in Luzon, for example, in the provinces of Quezon and Laguna. Stenobrimus tagalog comes from Polillo, a few kilometers off the southeast coast of Luzon. Stenobrimus lumad is native to Mindanao.

== Taxonomy ==
The genus Stenobrimus was established by Joseph Redtenbacher in 1906 as a monotypic genus for the simultaneously described Stenobrimus bolivari within the Obrimini. Redtenbacher described the species using a female that the Spanish naturalist and entomologist Ignacio Bolívar had collected in Luzon in the area around Tayabas. The species name was chosen in his honor. James Abram Garfield Rehn and his son John W. H. Rehn described Stenobrimus tagalog in 1939 as the second species of the genus based on a male. The species name is dedicated to the Filipino ethnic group of the Tagalog. Oliver Zompro elevated the Obrimini to a subfamily in 2004 and divided them into three tribes. He assigned Stenobrimus to the Eubulidini together with Eubulides, Tisamenus, Ilocano (today synonymous with Tisamenus), Hoploclonia, Heterocopus, Pterobrimus and Theramenes. A publication by Frank H. Hennemann et al. in 2016 moved back this tribe in and is now considered a synonym for the Obrimini, into which the genus Stenobrimus was transferred back. Within the obrimini three generic groups were established. The one put forward for Stenobrimus is the only monotypic one because of the unique characters of the genus. Even if the genus groups do not exist according to a work based on genetic analyzes and published in 2021, the special position of Stenobrimus could be confirmed in principle. In 2010, Stenobrimus lumad, whose species name is dedicated to the Lumad indigenous people of Mindanao, was described. In 2023 Stenobrimus pilipinus was described from Cavinti.

The species described so far are:

- Stenobrimus bolivari Redtenbacher, 1906
- Stenobrimus lumad Lit & Eusebio, 2010
- Stenobrimus pilipinus Eusebio, Lit & Lucañas, 2023
- Stenobrimus tagalog Rehn & Rehn, 1939

== Terraristic ==
In March 2008, Joachim Bresseel, Mark Bushell and Ellen Caluwe found specimens of Stenobrimus bolivari in Quezon National Park. Thierry Heitzmann also found some specimens of this species in south-east Luzon in 2008. Heitzmann bred the species in the Philippines. In Europe, Tim Bollens and Rob Krijns initially bred them succeeded in the Netherlands. Various species of ferns were eaten. Breeding has not been successful in the long term and no species of the genus has been in breeding since about 2012.
