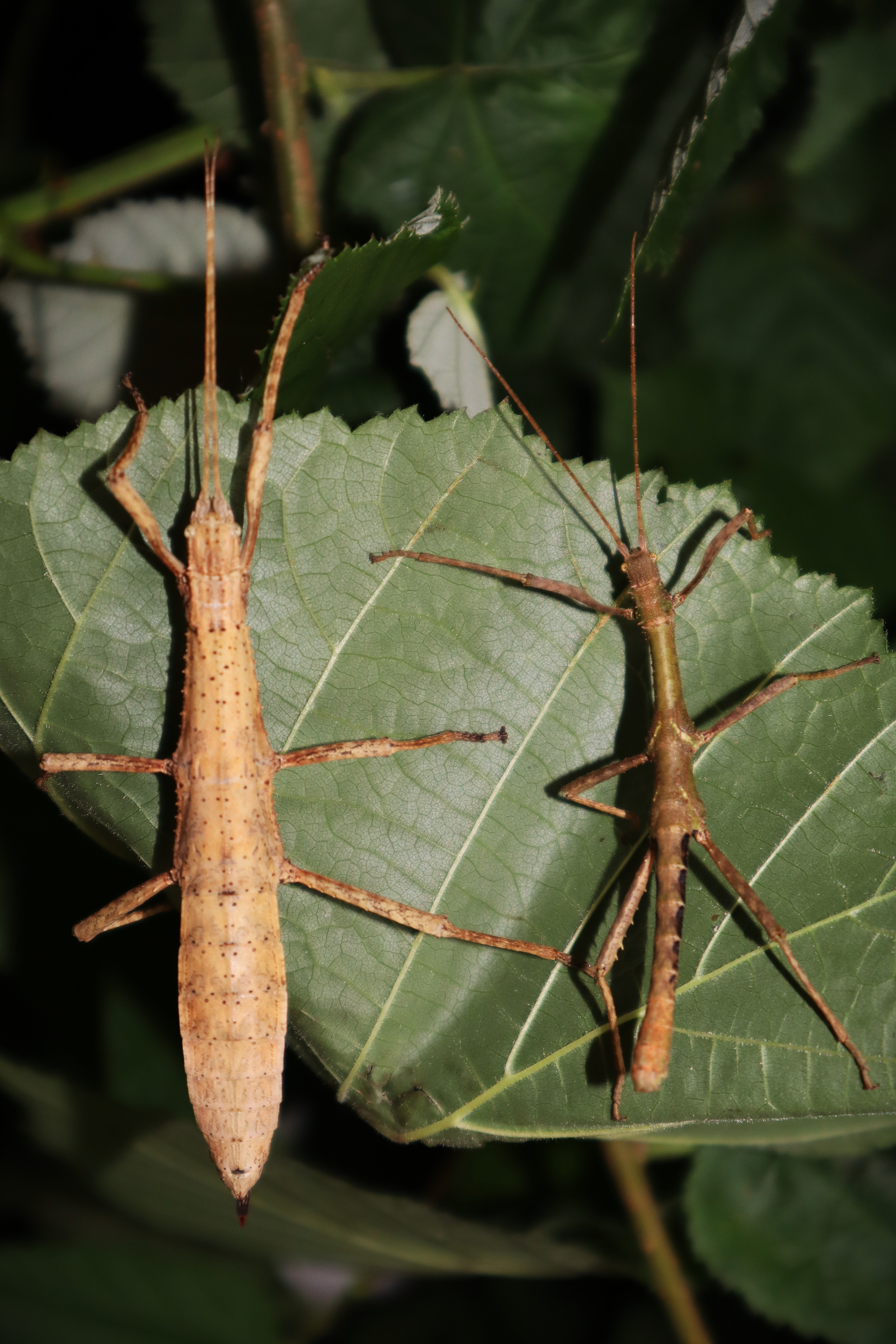
- Pair of Eubulides timog (PSG No. 311)

Scientific classification
- Kingdom: Animalia
- Phylum: Arthropoda
- Clade: Pancrustacea
- Class: Insecta
- Order: Phasmatodea
- Superfamily: Bacilloidea
- Family: Heteropterygidae
- Subfamily: Obriminae
- Tribe: Obrimini
- Genus: Eubulides; Stål, 1877

Type species
- Eubulides alutaceus Stål, 1877

Species
- List: Eubulides alutaceus; Eubulides blaan; Eubulides constanti; Eubulides igorrote; Eubulides lumawigi; Eubulides taylori; Eubulides timog

= Eubulides (insect) =

Genus of stick insects

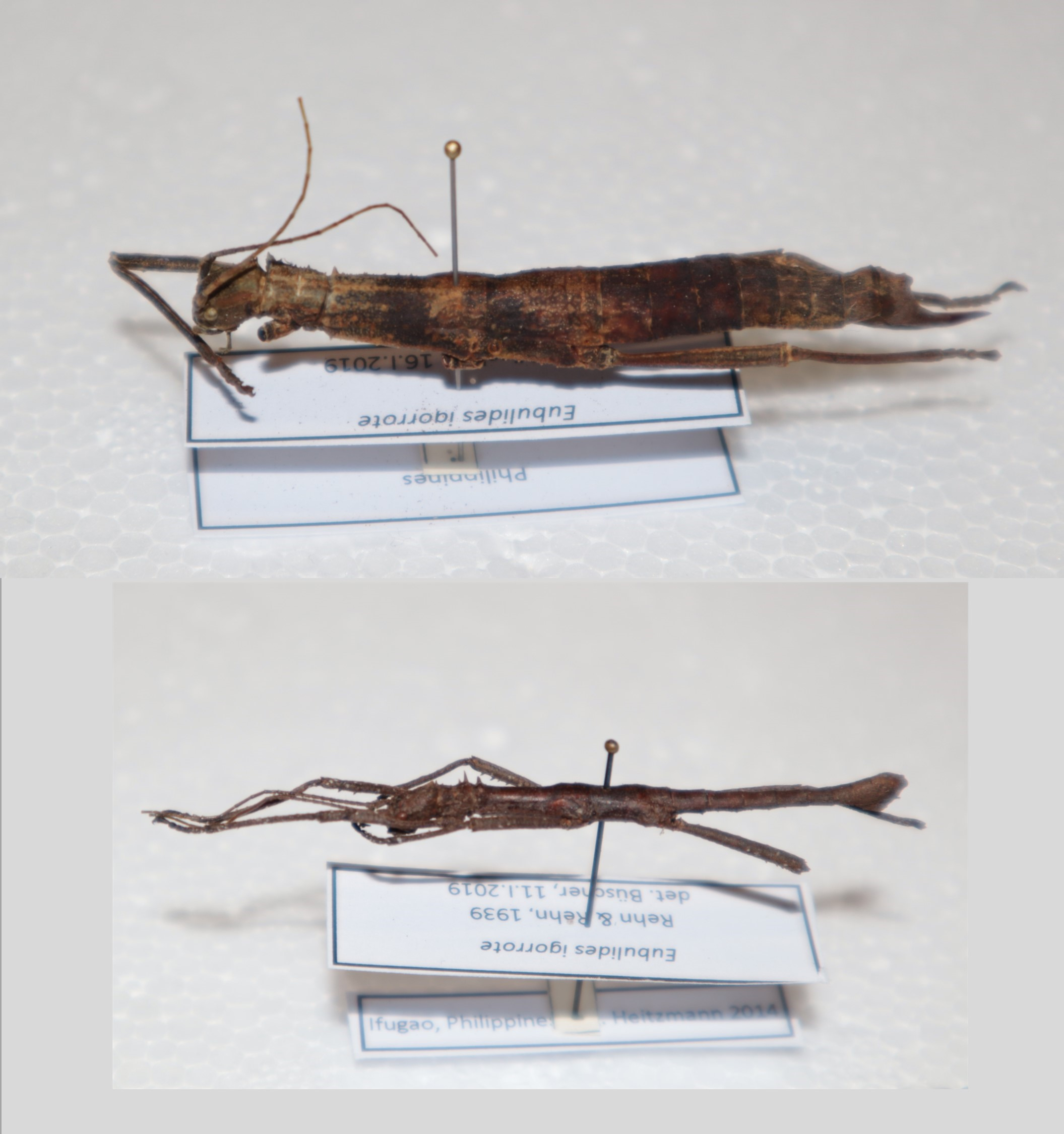
Prepared female and male of Eubulides igorrote

Eubulides is a stick insect genus native to the Philippines.

== Characteristics ==
The representatives of Eubulides are medium-sized, very slender and only slightly or hardly spined Obriminae species. The males reach 46 to 62 centimetres (18 to 24 in), the females 52 to 92 centimetres (20 to 36 in) in length. The head is flat and, like the pronotum, hardly reinforced or only covered with small tubercles. Only on the frontal margin of the elongated mesonotum spines may be present. There may be a few tubercles on the rear of the mesonotum. The middle femura are clearly toothed, the hind legs very strongly toothed. The secondary ovipositor of the females is designed as a curved laying sting.

== Distribution ==
The previously known distribution area of the genus includes the Philippine islands

Luzon, Leyte, Mindanao and Polillo. On Luzon there are representatives in the provinces Ilocos Norte, Mountain Province, Kalinga, Quirino, Ifugao, Quezon, Camarines Sur and Nueva Vizcaya, on Mindanao in the provinces Bukidnon and Agusan del Sur proven.

== Taxonomy ==
- - - Mearnsiana
    - Aretaon
  - - Eubulides
      - Eubulides sp. 2 (Mt. Kitanglad)
      - - Eubulides timog (Luzon)*
        - Eubulides igorrote (Imugan Falls)
          = Eubulides igorrote (Ifugao)
          = Eubulides igorrote (Mt. Pullol)
    - - Obrimini sp. 'Negros'
        = Trachyaretaon negrosanon
      - - Sungaya
        - Trachyaretaon

Cladogram of some Obrimini genera closely related to Eubulides *name changed according to Hennemann (2023)

In 1877, Carl Stål established the genus Eubulides in the first description of Eubulides alutaceus, which became the type species of the genus. The name is dedicated to the Greek philosopher Eubulides. William Forsell Kirby placed the genus 1904 in the subfamily Eurycanthinae, today only considered as tribe Euricanthini. He added a second species to it with the newly written Eubulides spuria, which since 2005 has been regarded as synonym of Dryococelus australis. Josef Redtenbacher continues to treat the genus 1906 as monotypical and includes it in the tribe Obrimini. Two additional species were added through descriptions by James Abram Garfield Rehn and his son John William Holman Rehn in 1939. The 2022 by Mescel S. Acola, Jeremy Carlo B. Naredo and Orlando L. Eusebio in 2022 described Eubulides manobo was transferred by Frank H. Hennemann to the genus Armadolides, which was created specifically for this species. At the same time, Hennemann described four other Eubulides species.

Valid species are:

- Eubulides alutaceus Stål, 1877
- Eubulides blaan Hennemann, 2023
- Eubulides constanti Hennemann, 2023
- Eubulides igorrote Rehn, J.A.G. & Rehn, J. W. H., 1939
- Eubulides lumawigi Hennemann, 2023
- Eubulides taylori Rehn, J.A.G. & Rehn, J. W. H., 1939
- Eubulides timog Hennemann, 2023

In 2004 Oliver Zompro raised the Obrimini to the rank of a subfamily and divided them into three tribes. One of them was that of the Eubulidini. In addition to the type genus Eubulides, he also placed in this Tisamenus, Ilocano (now synonymous with Tisamenus), Hoploclonia, Stenobrimus, Heterocopus, Pterobrimus and Theramenes. This tribe was withdrawn in 2016 by Hennemann et al and is now a synonym for the Obrimini.

In their work on the spread and relationships within the Heteropterygidae, based mainly on genetic analysis, which was published in 2021, Sarah Bank et al also examined samples from five members of the genus Eubulides. Three turned out to be conspecific and were identified as Eubulides igorrote. Two more could not be assigned to any known species and represent new species. One of them was described by Hennemann in 2023 as Eubulides timog. The second, like Eubulides blaan, also described by Hennemann, comes from Mindanao, more precisely from Mt. Kitanglad in the province of Bukidnon. Within the Obrimini the genus forms a sister group with a clade from the genera Sungaya, Trachyaretaon and Trachyaretaon negrosanon.

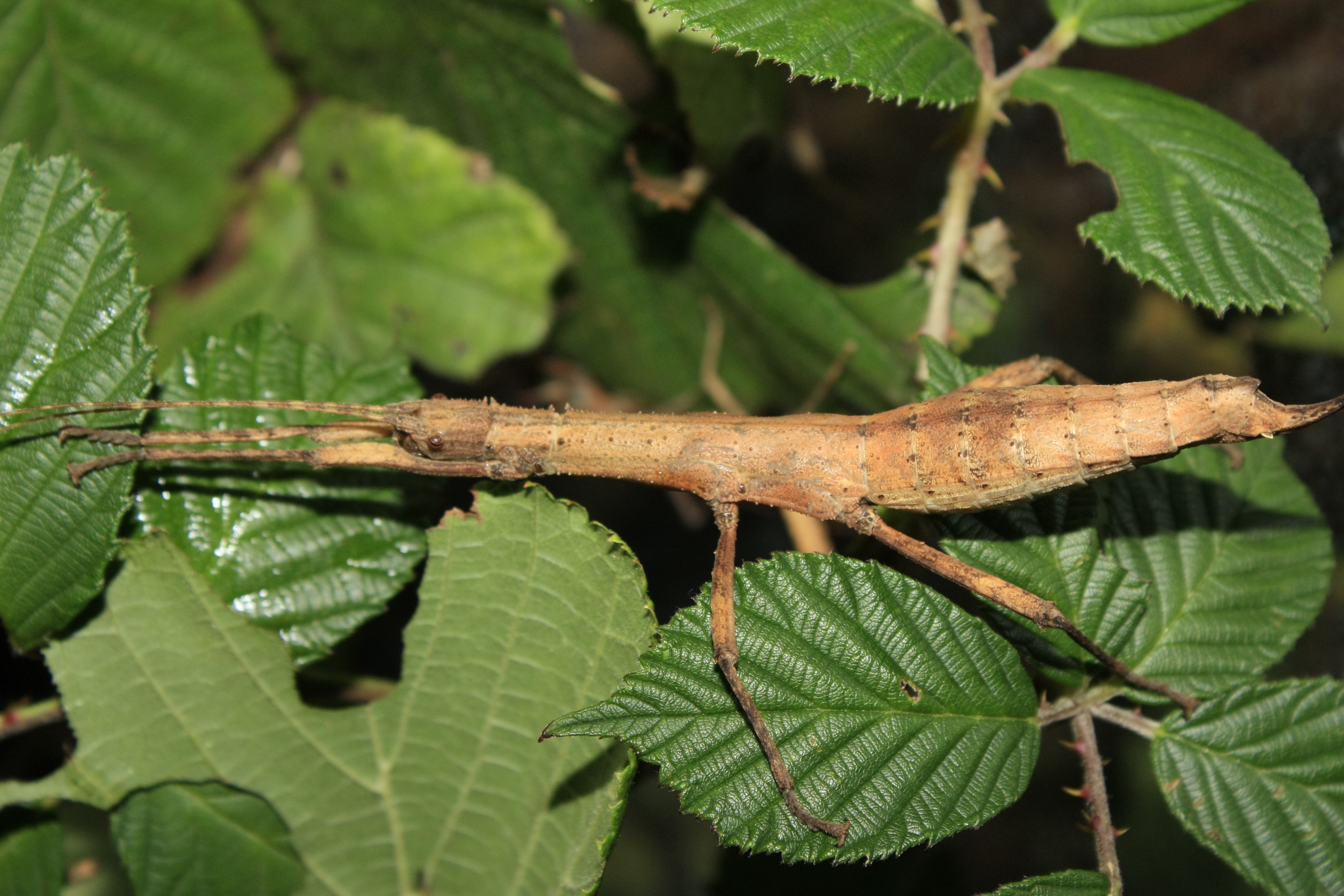
Female of Eubulides timog (PSG No. 311)

== Terraristic ==
The first and probably only stock of an Eubulides species goes back to specimens that were collected in 2009 by Joachim Bresseel and Thierry Heitzmann in the province Quezon on the island of Luzon. Hennemann described it as Eubulides timog in 2023. The Phasmid Study Group assigned the PSG number 311 for this stock. The species was initially sexually in breeding, but is probably only kept parthenogenetically. The species affiliation was controversial until 2023. It was initially called Eubulides igorrote and later named as Eubulides alutaceus. While the former is a much more robust species than the animals of the breeding stock, Eubulides igorrote has small spines on the pronotum and larger spines on the front edge of the mesonotum, which the breeding stock specimens lack. Two to three other breeding stocks known as Eubulides sp. 'Ifugao' or again as Eubulides alutaceus 'Vera Falls' came to Europe, are no longer in breeding.

Eubulides timog needs a high level of humidity and substrate to lay eggs. While the generations that were first bred only ate Araceae, like Epipremnum, they can now be fed with the leaves of bramble or hazel without any problems. The parthenogenetic stock is considered to be easy to keep and to breed.
