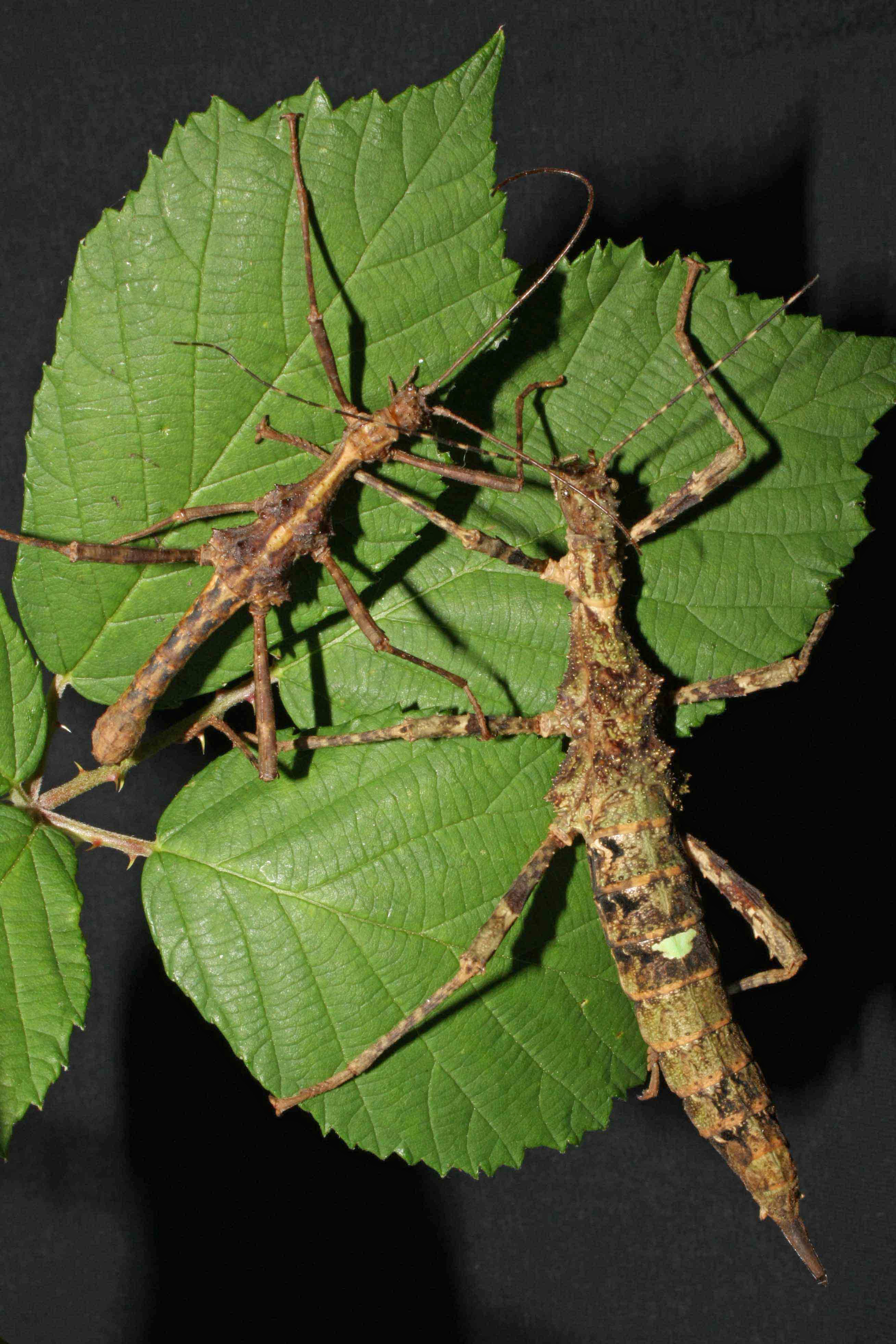
- Pair of Trachyaretaon negrosanon 'Negros'

Scientific classification
- Kingdom: Animalia
- Phylum: Arthropoda
- Clade: Pancrustacea
- Class: Insecta
- Order: Phasmatodea
- Family: Heteropterygidae
- Subfamily: Obriminae
- Tribe: Obrimini; Brunner von Wattenwyl, 1893

Genera
- List: Aretaon; Armadolides; Brasidas; Eubulides; Heterocopus; Mearnsiana; Miroceramia; Obrimus; Pterobrimus; Stenobrimus; Sungaya; Theramenes; Tisamenus; Trachyaretaon
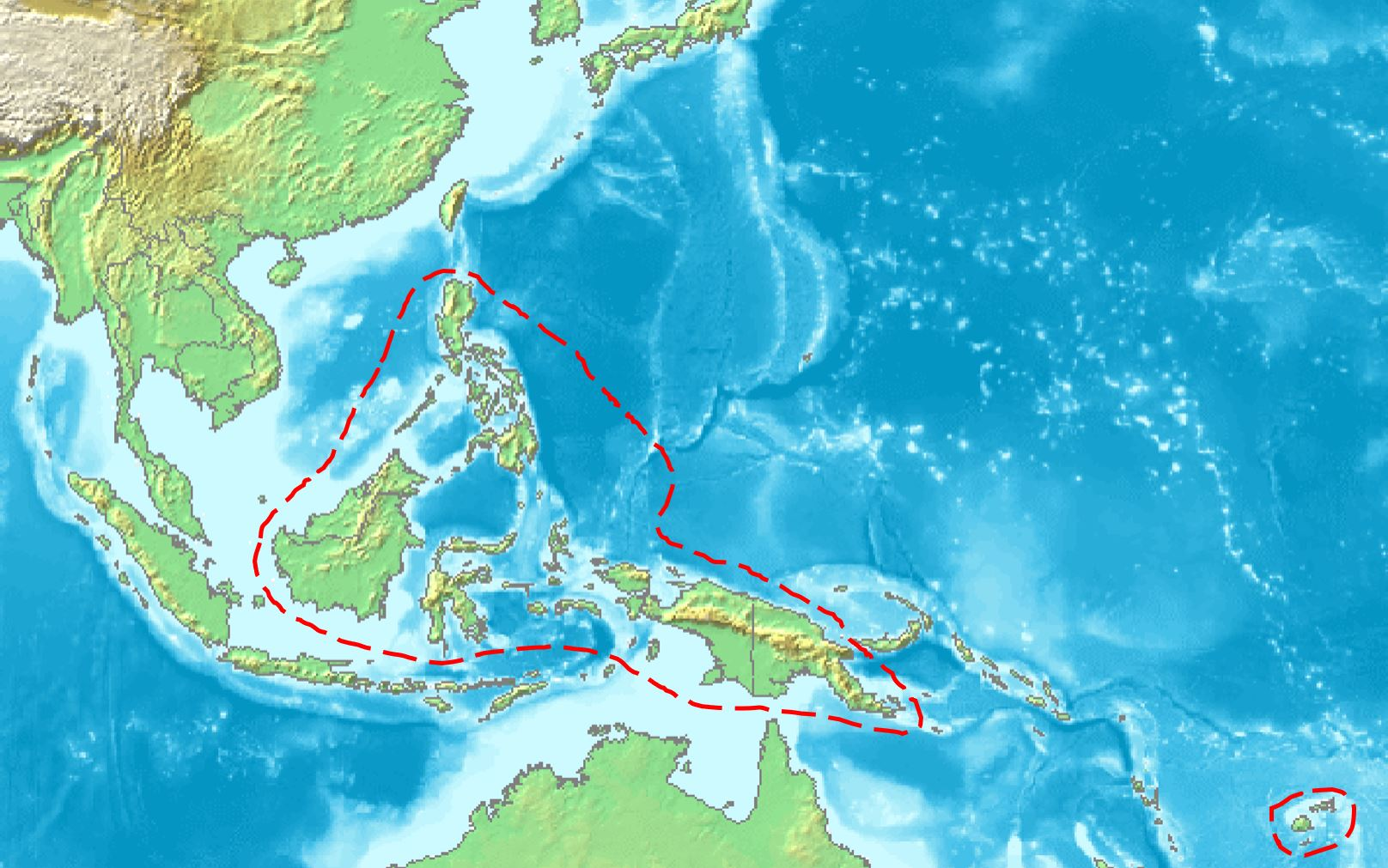
- Range of the Obrimini

Synonyms
- Eubulidini Zompro, 2004; Miroceramiini Zompro, 2004; Tisamenini Hennemann, Conle, Brock & Seow-Choen, 2016

= Obrimini =

Obrimini Temporal range: 50–0 Ma Early Eocene to present

Tribe of stick insects

The Obrimini are the most species-rich tribe of the Phasmatodea family of the Heteropterygidae native to Southeast Asia.

== Description ==
The Obrimini differ from their sister tribe the Hoplocloniini by the structure of the secondary ovipositor at the abdomen of the females, which surrounds the actual ovipositor. It is formed in the Obrimini dorsally from the eleventh abdominal tergum called supraanal plate or epiproct, while in the Hoplocloniini it originated from the tenth tergum.

== Distribution area ==
The distribution area of the Obrimini extends from Borneo to the east and includes the Philippines, Sulawesi, most of the Moluccas and New Guinea. Farthest east lies with Viti Levu, the main island of the Fiji group, the distribution area of Pterobrimus depressus.

== Taxonomy ==
- Obrimini
  - - Miroceramia
    - Pterobrimus
  - - - Theramenes
      - Tisamenus
    - - Stenobrimus
      - - - Obrimus
          - Brasidas
            Euobrimus
        - - - Mearnsiana
            - Aretaon
          - - Eubulides
            - - Obrimini sp. 'Negros'
                = Trachyaretaon negrosanon
              - - Sungaya
                - Trachyaretaon

Relationships of the examined Obrimini genera by Sarah Bank et al (2021)

Brunner von Wattenwyl built in 1893 for the genera already described Obrimus, Hoploclonia, Tisamenus, Pylaemenes, Dares and Datames (today a synonym to Pylaemenes) the tribe Obrimini (abbreviated there as Obrimi.). He placed these together with the genus Heteropteryx and the South American tribe Cladomorphini (abbreviated there as Cladomorphi.) in the family Cladomorphidae (now synonymous with Cladomorphinae). In the following years, basesd on this work, mostly genera of today's Obriminae and Dataminae were listed in this tribe, for example by Josef Redtenbacher in 1906. Lawrence Bruner raised the Obrimini to the rank of a family in 1915. James Abram Garfield Rehn and his son John William Holman Rehn divided the Obriminae, which they only referred to as a subfamily, into the tribes Obrimini and Datamini in 1939. Both tribes were transferred in 1953 by Klaus Günther to the subfamily Heteropteryginae. In 2004 Oliver Zompro raised this subfamily to the rank of family and the tribes contained in the rank of subfamilies or in the rank of a separate family (Anisacanthidae). At the same time he built three tribes in the subfamily Obriminae. In addition to the Obrimini, these were the Miroceramiini and the Eubulidini. The latter was in 2016 by Frank H. Hennemann et al synonymized with the Obrimini. At the same time, the new tribe Tisamenini was established within the Obriminae. In a study based on genetic analysis, published in 2021, Sarah Bank et al. synonymized the tribe Miroceramiini and the tribe Tisamenini with the Obrimini and placed next to this the Hoplocloniini as the only other tribe in the subfamily Obriminae. In addition, a species previously referred to as Trachyaretaon sp. 'Negros' was identified as a representative of an as yet undescribed genus. Hennemann described this in 2023 alongside many other species of the tribe as Trachyaretaon negrosanon.

=== Genera with species ===
Image	Genus	Species
	Aretaon Rehn, J.A.G. & Rehn, J.W.H., 1939	Aretaon asperrimus (Redtenbacher, 1906); Aretaon muscosus (Redtenbacher, 1906)
	Armadolides Hennemann, 2023	Armadolides manobo (Acola, Naredo & Eusebio, 2022)
	Brasidas Rehn, J.A.G. & Rehn, J.W.H., 1939	Brasidas bakeri (Rehn, J.A.G. & Rehn, J.W.H., 1939); Brasidas cavernosus (Stål, 1877); Brasidas foveolatus (Redtenbacher, 1906); Brasidas lacerta (Redtenbacher, 1906); Brasidas malaki Hennemann, 2023; Brasidas manobo Hennemann, 2023; Brasidas rehni Hennemann, 2023; Brasidas samarensis Rehn, J.A.G. & Rehn, J.W.H., 1939; Brasidas viscayanus Rehn, J.A.G. & Rehn, J.W.H., 1939; Brasidas waray Hennemann, 2023
	Eubulides Stål, 1877	Eubulides alutaceus Stål, 1877; Eubulides blaan Hennemann, 2023; Eubulides constanti Hennemann, 2023; Eubulides igorrote Rehn, J.A.G. & Rehn, J.W.H., 1939; Eubulides lumawigi Hennemann, 2023; Eubulides taylori Rehn, J.A.G. & Rehn, J.W.H., 1939; Eubulides timog Hennemann, 2023
	Heterocopus Redtenbacher, 1906	Heterocopus leprosus Redtenbacher, 1906
	Mearnsiana Rehn, J.A.G. & Rehn, J.W.H., 1939	Mearnsiana bullosa Rehn, J.A.G. & Rehn, J.W.H., 1939; Mearnsiana maranao Hennemann, 2023
	Miroceramia Günther, 1934	Miroceramia westwoodii (Bates, 1865)
	Obrimus Stål, 1875	Obrimus bicolanus Rehn, J.A.G. & Rehn, J.W.H., 1939; Obrimus bufo (Westwood, 1848); Obrimus mesoplatus (Westwood, 1848); Obrimus uichancoi Rehn, J.A.G. & Rehn, J.W.H., 1939
	Pterobrimus Redtenbacher, 1906	Pterobrimus depressus Redtenbacher, 1906
	Stenobrimus Redtenbacher, 1906	Stenobrimus bolivari Redtenbacher, 1906; Stenobrimus lumad Lit & Eusebio, 2010; Stenobrimus pilipinus Eusebio, Lit & Lucañas, 2023; Stenobrimus tagalog Rehn, J.A.G. & Rehn, J.W.H., 1939
	Sungaya Zompro, 1996	Sungaya aeta Hennemann, 2023; Sungaya dumagat Hennemann, 2023; Sungaya ibaloi Hennemann, 2023; Sungaya inexpectata Zompro, 1996
	Theramenes Stål, 1875	Theramenes dromedarius Stål, 1877; Theramenes exiguus Hennemann & Conle, 2003; Theramenes letiranti Hennemann, 2023; Theramenes mandirigma Zompro & Eusebio, 2001; Theramenes olivaceus (Westwood, 1859)
	Tisamenus Stål, 1875	Tisamenus alviolanus Lit & Eusebio, 2010; Tisamenus armadillo Redtenbacher, 1906; Tisamenus asper (Bolívar, 1890); Tisamenus cervicornis Ignacio Bolívar, 1890; Tisamenus charestae Hennemann & Le Tirant, 2025; Tisamenus clotho (Rehn, J.A.G. & Rehn, J.W.H., 1939); Tisamenus deplanatus (Westwood, 1848); Tisamenus draconina (Westwood, 1848); Tisamenus fratercula (Rehn, J.A.G. & Rehn, J.W.H., 1939); Tisamenus hebardi (Rehn, J.A.G. & Rehn, J.W.H., 1939); Tisamenus heitzmanni Hennemann, 2025; Tisamenus hystrix (Rehn, J.A.G. & Rehn, J.W.H., 1939); Tisamenus irenoliti Hennemann, 2025; Tisamenus kalahani Lit & Eusebio, 2005; Tisamenus lachesis (Rehn, J.A.G. & Rehn, J.W.H., 1939); Tisamenus makinis Hennemann, 2025; Tisamenus malawak Hennemann, 2025; Tisamenus napalaki Hennemann, 2025; Tisamenus polillo (Rehn, J.A.G. & Rehn, J.W.H., 1939); Tisamenus ranarius (Westwood, 1859); Tisamenus serratorius Stål, 1875; Tisamenus spadix (Rehn, J.A.G. & Rehn, J.W.H., 1939); Tisamenus summaleonilae Lit & Eusebio, 2005; Tisamenus tagalog (Rehn, J.A.G. & Rehn, J.W.H., 1939); Tisamenus trapezoides Hennemann, 2025
	Trachyaretaon Rehn, J.A.G. & Rehn, J.W.H., 1939	Trachyaretaon bresseeli Hennemann, 2023; Trachyaretaon carmelae Lit & Eusebio, 2005; Trachyaretaon echinatus (Stål, 1877); Trachyaretaon gatla Zompro, 2004; Trachyaretaon maliit Hennemann, 2023; Trachyaretaon mangyan Hennemann, 2023; Trachyaretaon nakatago Hennemann, 2023; Trachyaretaon negrosanon Hennemann, 2023; Trachyaretaon tumandok Hennemann, 2023
