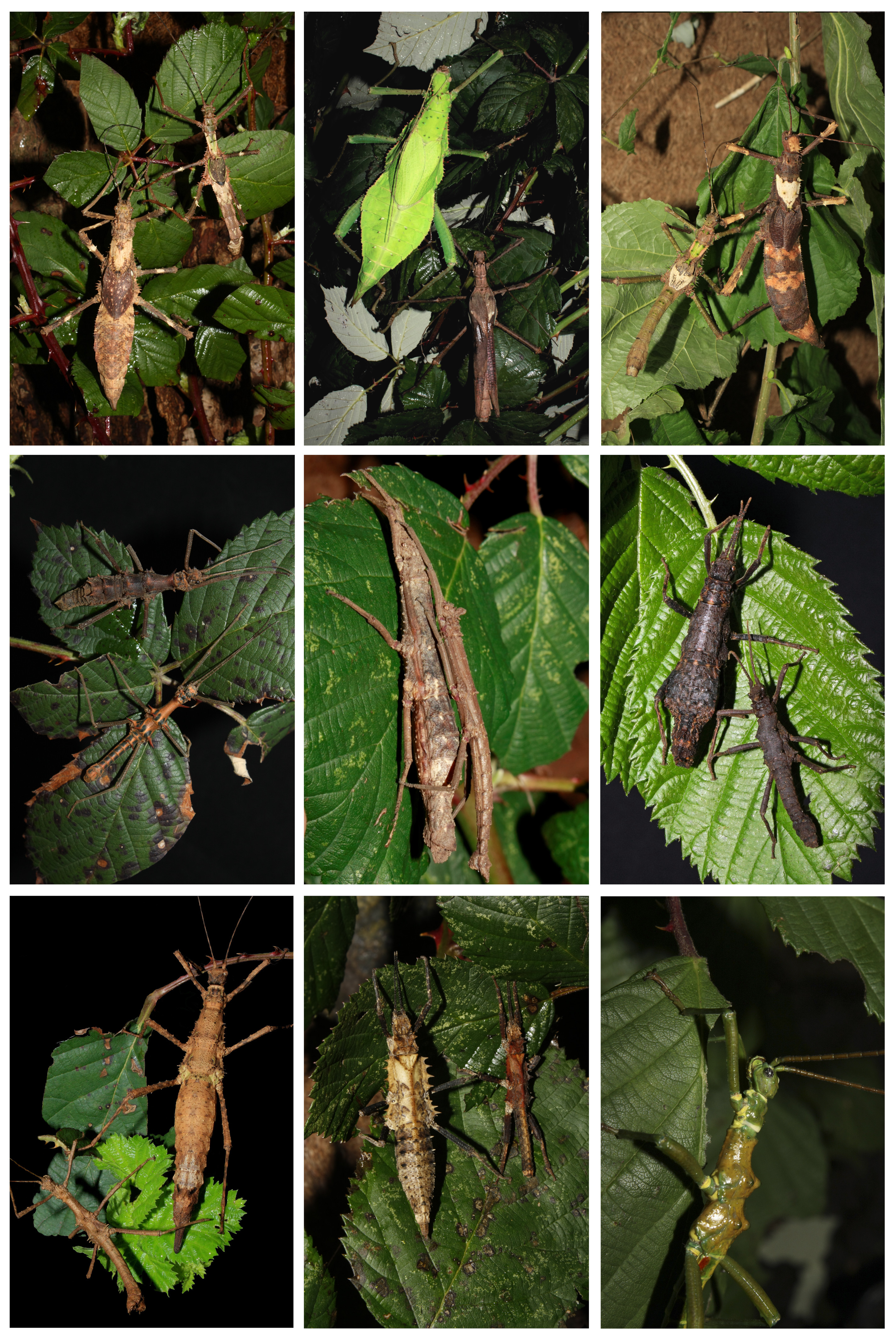
- Different species of Heteropterygidae

Scientific classification
- Kingdom: Animalia
- Phylum: Arthropoda
- Clade: Pancrustacea
- Class: Insecta
- Order: Phasmatodea
- Superfamily: Bacilloidea
- Family: Heteropterygidae; Kirby, 1896

Subfamilies
- Dataminae; Heteropteryginae; Obriminae
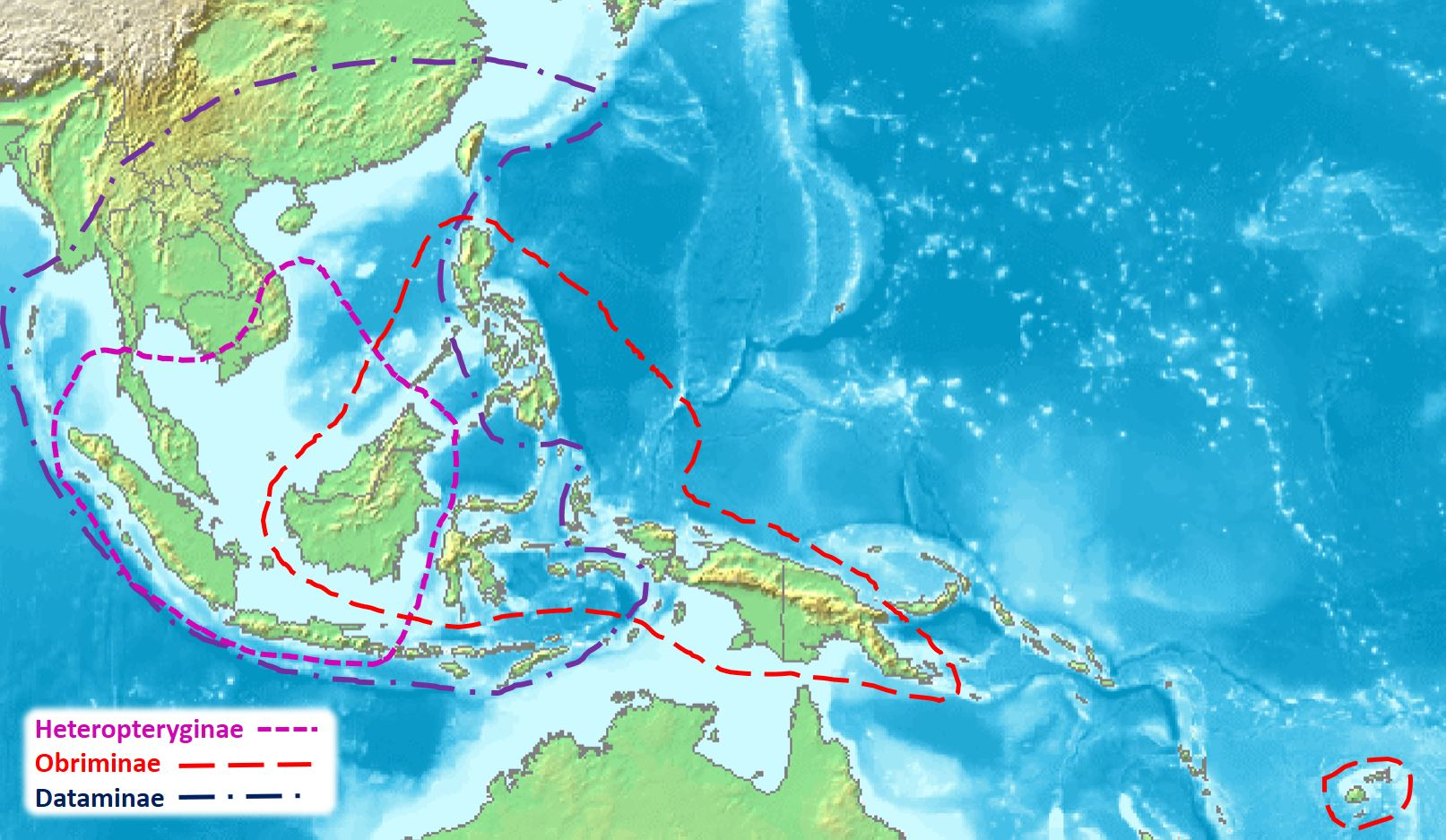
- Range of the Heteropterygidae

= Heteropterygidae =

Heteropterygidae Temporal range: 50–0 Ma Early Eocene to present

Family of stick insects

The Heteropterygidae is a family of stick insects belonging to the suborder Euphasmatodea. Species can be found in Australasia, East and Southeast Asia. About 150 valid species have been described (at the end of 2023).

== Characteristics ==
=== Size ===
The Heteropterygidae include both very small and very large and massive species. The representatives of the Dataminae are consistently rather small. So Planispectrum species are only 1.9 to 3.5 centimetres (0.75 to 1.38 in) long. The largest Dataminae species, with a maximum length of 5.0 to 6.0 centimetres (2.0 to 2.4 in), are within the genera Pylaemenes and Orestes. While the subfamily Obriminae with almost 3.0 centimetres (1.2 in) in Tisamenus hebardi and up to 13.5 centimetres (5.3 in) in Trachyaretaon carmelae shows a wide range of sizes, the Heteropteryginae are considered rather large. Indeed, there are very large and massive species, such as the up to 17.0 centimetres (6.7 in) long Heteropteryx dilatata known as Malayan jungle nymph, but also small species such as those in the male sex only 2.5 to 3.7 centimetres (0.98 to 1.46 in) long Haaniella parva.

=== Morphology ===
A common autapomorphic characteristic of the Heteropterygidae is the presence of sensory areas on the prosternum. In the Dataminae is a pair of these sensory fields on the Prosternum and in the middle behind it a third on the so-called (Pro-) Furcasternit. The Obriminae lack the posterior field that is present in the Heteropteryginae. These in turn lack the front pair of sensory fields. A striking morphological feature is the females abdomen, which is widened towards the middle. In adult females this area is not only wide, but also significantly increased due to the eggs that are permanently and often produced in more or less large numbers. In the females of the subfamilies Heteropteryginae and Obriminae, the abdomen ends in a pointed secondary ovipositor that surrounds the actual ovipositor. This is ventral formed from the eighth abdominal sternite, which is here named subgenital plate, or also called operculum. Dorsally it is formed in the Heteropteryginae and the Obrimini by the eleventh abdominal tergum called the supraanal plate or Epiproct. In case of the Hoplocloniini, is formed by the tenth abdominal tergum. The smaller males have a cylindrical formed middle of abdomen, which is the thinnest area of abdomen in contrast to the females. The thickened end of the abdomen is formed ventrally by the subgenital plate and dorsally by the eighth, ninth and tenth tergum. The latter is known as the anal segment. Except in Miroceramia westwoodii and in a reduced form in Pterobrimus depressus the only representatives of their genera, the species of Obriminae and Dataminae have no wings, while the Heteropteryginae have wings. Their forewings, here developed as Tegmina and mostly also the hindwings are shortened, as in many Haaniella species and the female of Heteropteryx dilatata. In some Haaniella males and those of Heteropteryx dilatata the tegmina cover almost the entire abdomen. The fully developed hind wings underneath enable them to make short flights.

=== Acanthotaxy ===
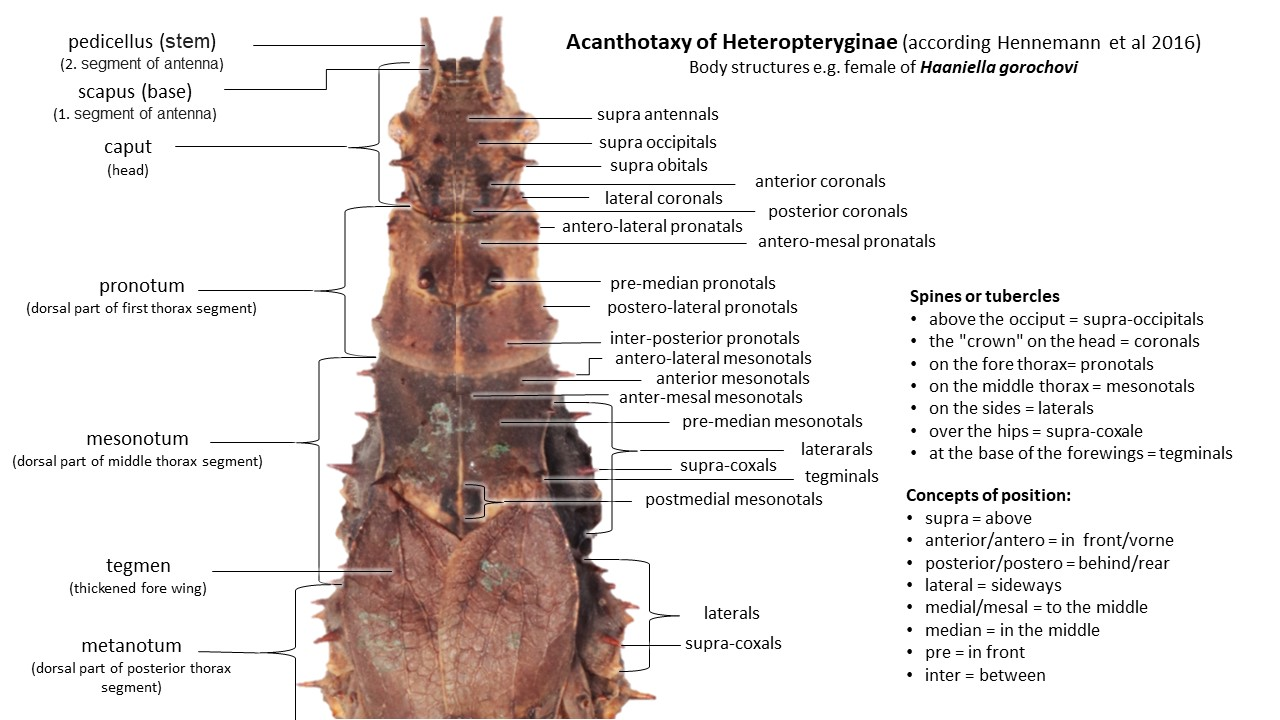
Acanthotaxy of the Heteropteryginae using the example of Haaniella gorochovi, ♀

The body can be covered with numerous pointed spines, more or less blunt thorns or tubercles, which can be found mainly on the upper side of the head and thorax. Their characteristics can be very different and often so species-specific that they are used to identify and delimit species. This method, known as acanthotaxy, was developed in 1939 by James Abram Garfield Rehn and his son John William Holman Rehn for the Obriminae, and was modified in 1998 and 2001 by Philip Edward Bragg for the Dataminae and adapted in 2016 by Frank H. Hennemann et al. for the Heteropteryginae. The respective structures are named according to their location. The spines, which are located on the vertex of the head, which is inclined downwards, act like a crown and are therefore called coronals (Corona Latin for wreath or crown). The ones above the base of the antennae are called supraantenals, those on the occiput are called supraoccipital. Spines on the pro, meso- and metanotum are referred to as pronotals, mesonatals and metanotals, respectively. Spines on the meso- and meta pleura are generally referred to as laterals and the individual spines above the coxae are referred to as supracoxals.

== Distribution area ==
The center of the distribution area of the Heteropterygidae is Borneo, where representatives of all three subfamilies occur. The Heteropteryginae have the smallest distribution area. Besides Borneo, it only includes the Thailand part of Malay Peninsula, Sumatra and Java. On the continental mainland of Asia Haaniella gorochovi is the only Hetropteryginae species, which can be found in the south of Vietnam. The distribution area of Dataminae includes the entire region inhabited by the Heteropteryginae. In addition, they settle on the Asian mainland in eastern Myanmar, Thailand, Laos, Cambodia, Vietnam and parts of South China. To the east are the Okinawa Islands, Taiwan, Palawan, the Moluccas islands Buru and Seram, all of the Lesser Sunda Islands and Sulawesi inhabited. The distribution area of Obriminae extends from Borneo to the east. It includes the Philippines, Sulawesi, most of the Moluccas Islands, and New Guinea. Even further to the east is Viti Levu, the main island of the Fiji group, which is the distribution area of Pterobrimus depressus.

== Reproduction and life cycle ==
The adult females of Heteropteryginae and Obriminae lay their often relatively large eggs almost always individually, several centimeters deep in the ground using the ovipositor. The Dataminae also lay their eggs on or in the ground. In Epidares and some Orestes species it has been proven that they prepare a hollow in the ground with their forelegs, then quickly fold the abdomen over the front body, squeezing out an egg. This is catapulted forward, caught with the antennae and rolled over them into the trough, where it will covered with earth by using the forelegs again. After two to twelve months, the nymphs hatch from the eggs, which are quite large even in smaller species with a length of at least 10 mm. Growing up to imago often takes up to a year. Except species with a medium life expectancy of at least six to twelve months, there are others that reach an amazing age. For example, Oskar V. Conle was able to prove that a female of Haaniella scabra wild caught was more than five years old. Such lifetimes are also documented by the Dataminae, for example in Dares verrucosus.

== Defense behaviour ==
Typical of the short-winged representatives of the subfamily Heteropteryginae is a pronounced defensive behavior in which the opponent is initially threatened by a defensive stridulation generated with the wings. Long-winged representatives lack the ability to stridulate. They open the wings to appear larger. Finally, the abdomen and the thorny hind legs are raised, whose tibiae are knocked against the femura like a ratchet knife during tactile stimuli, causing the opponent to become trapped. In contrast, the less armed species are much better camouflaged. Almost all Obriminae rely on camouflage and cling to the bark or branches of the trees on which they are usually hidden during the day. The representatives of the Dataminae have almost perfected the mimesis of bark and short branches. If they are touched, most species react with playing dead. Therefore, the legs and antennae are placed along the body axis to create the impression of a short stick. A pronounced autotomy of the legs, as it is known in many other phasmids, is not found in the Heteropterygidae.

== Taxonomy ==
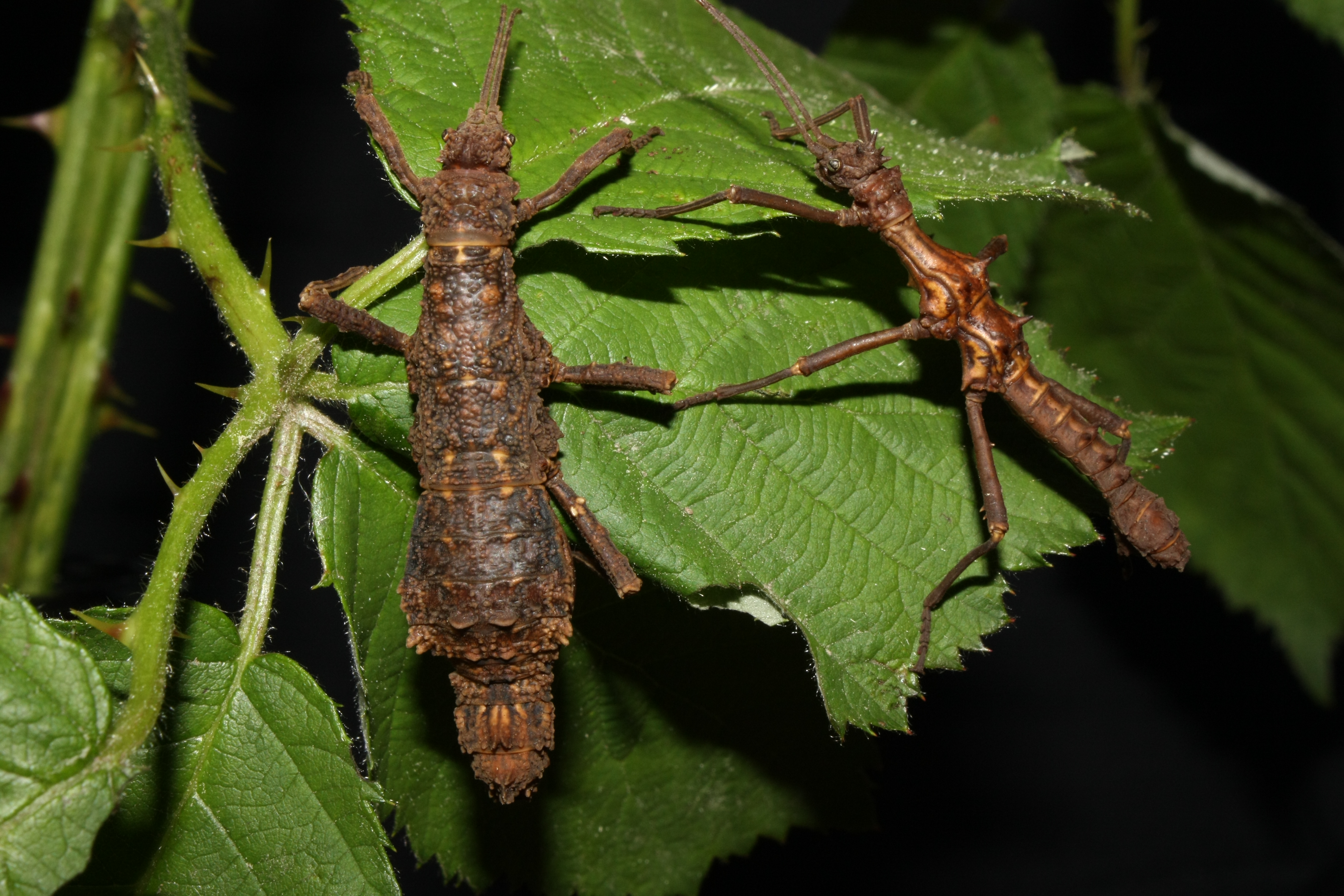
Dares validispinus, pair

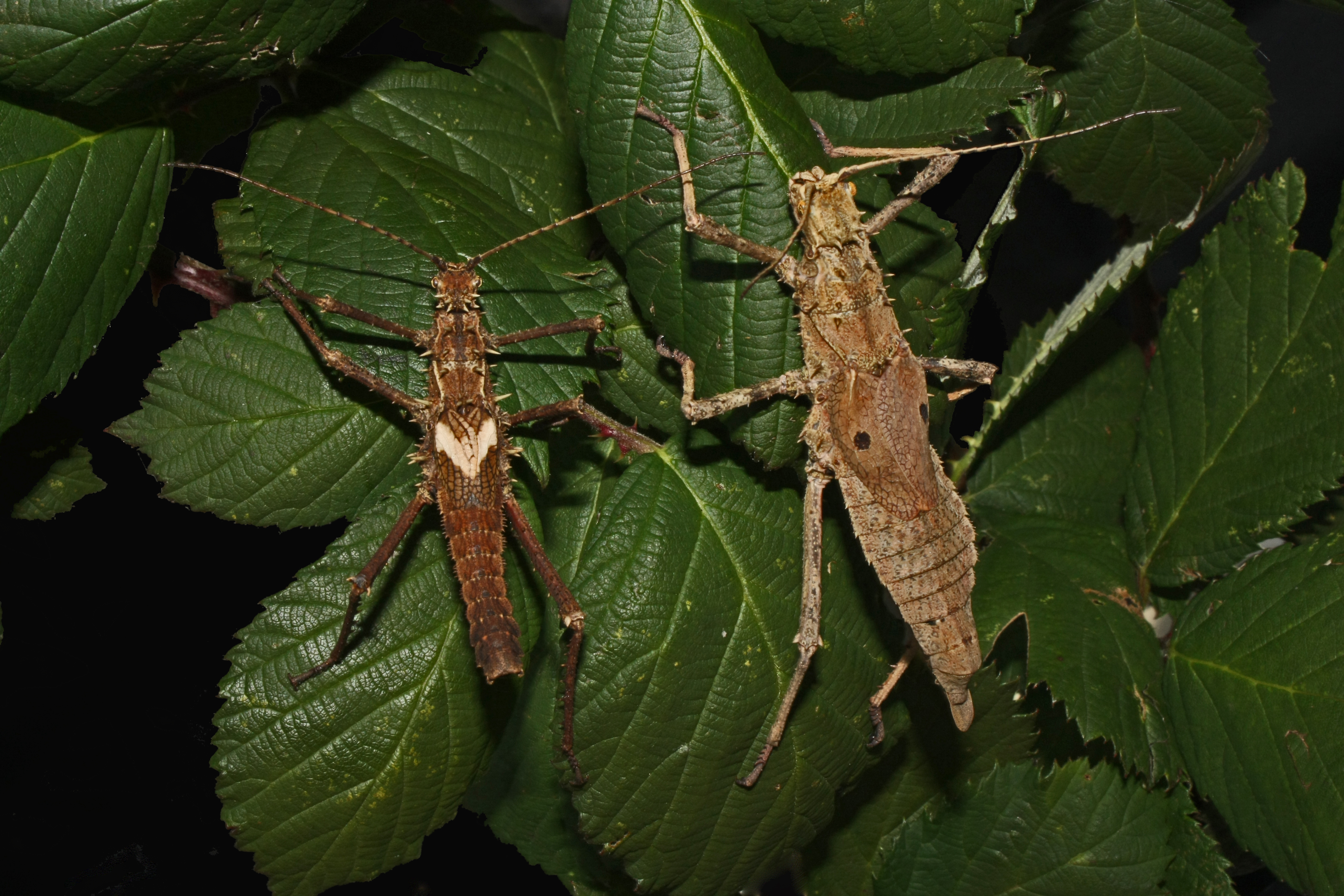
Haaniella scabra, pair

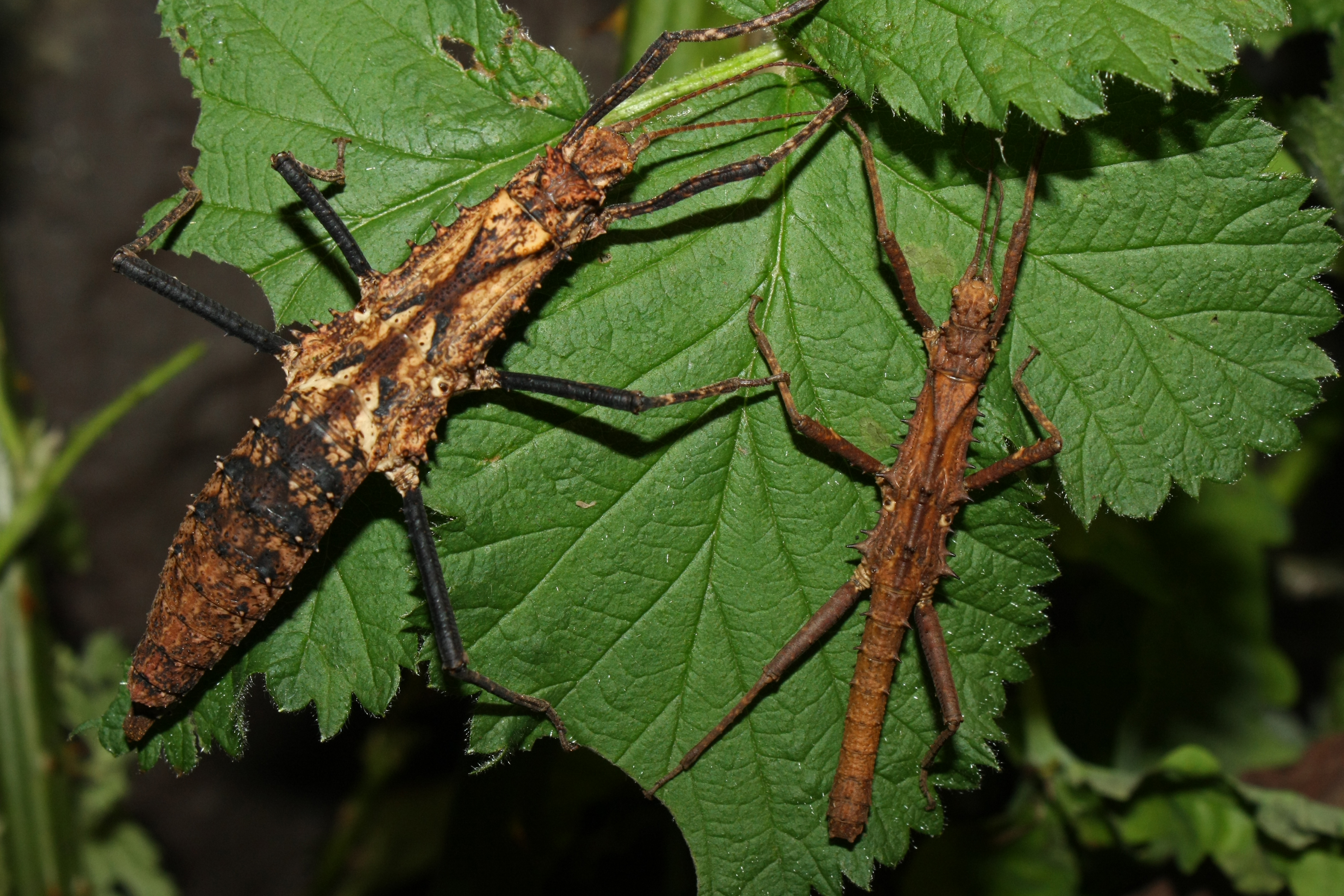
Tisamenus serratorius, pair

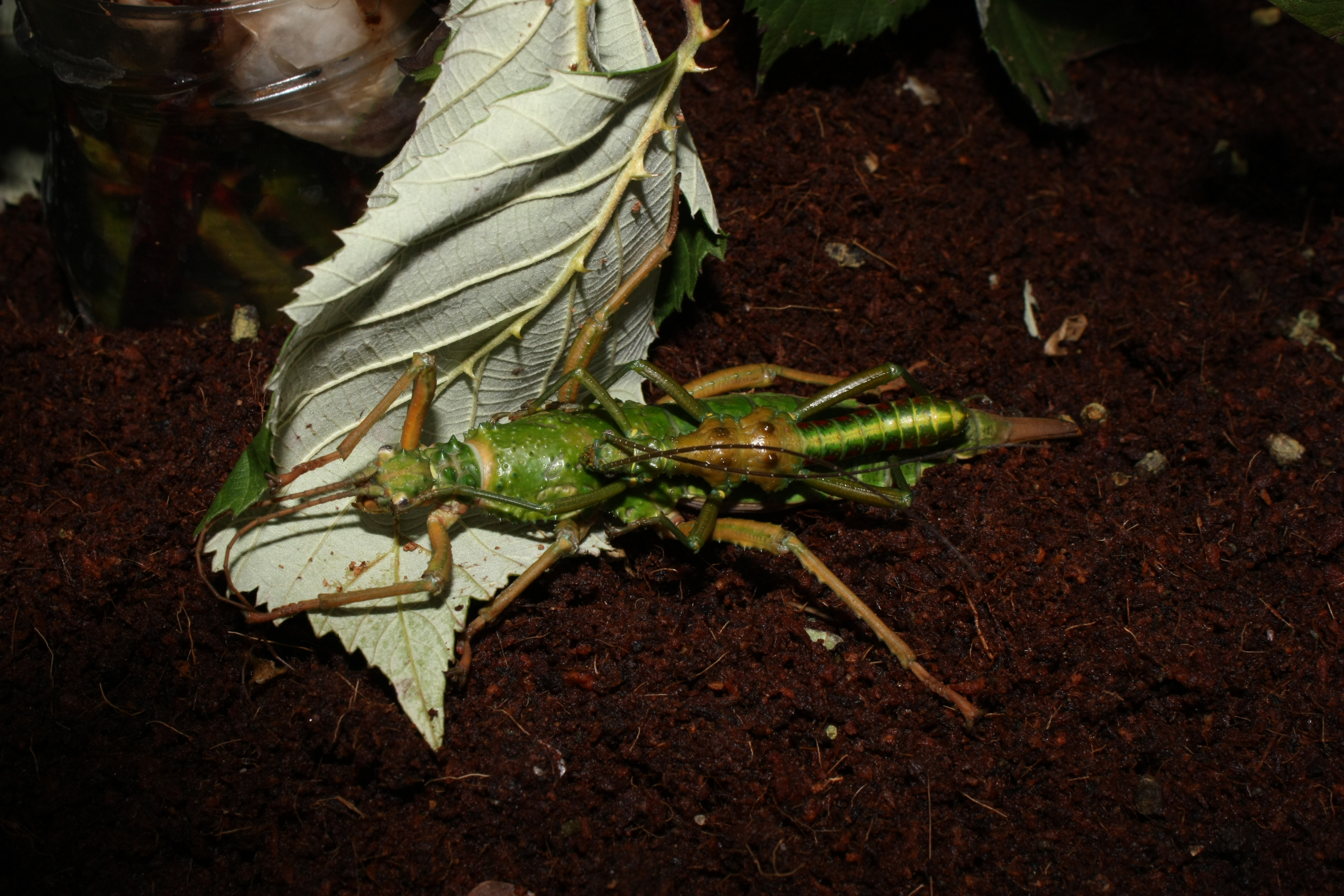
Mearnsiana bullosa, pair

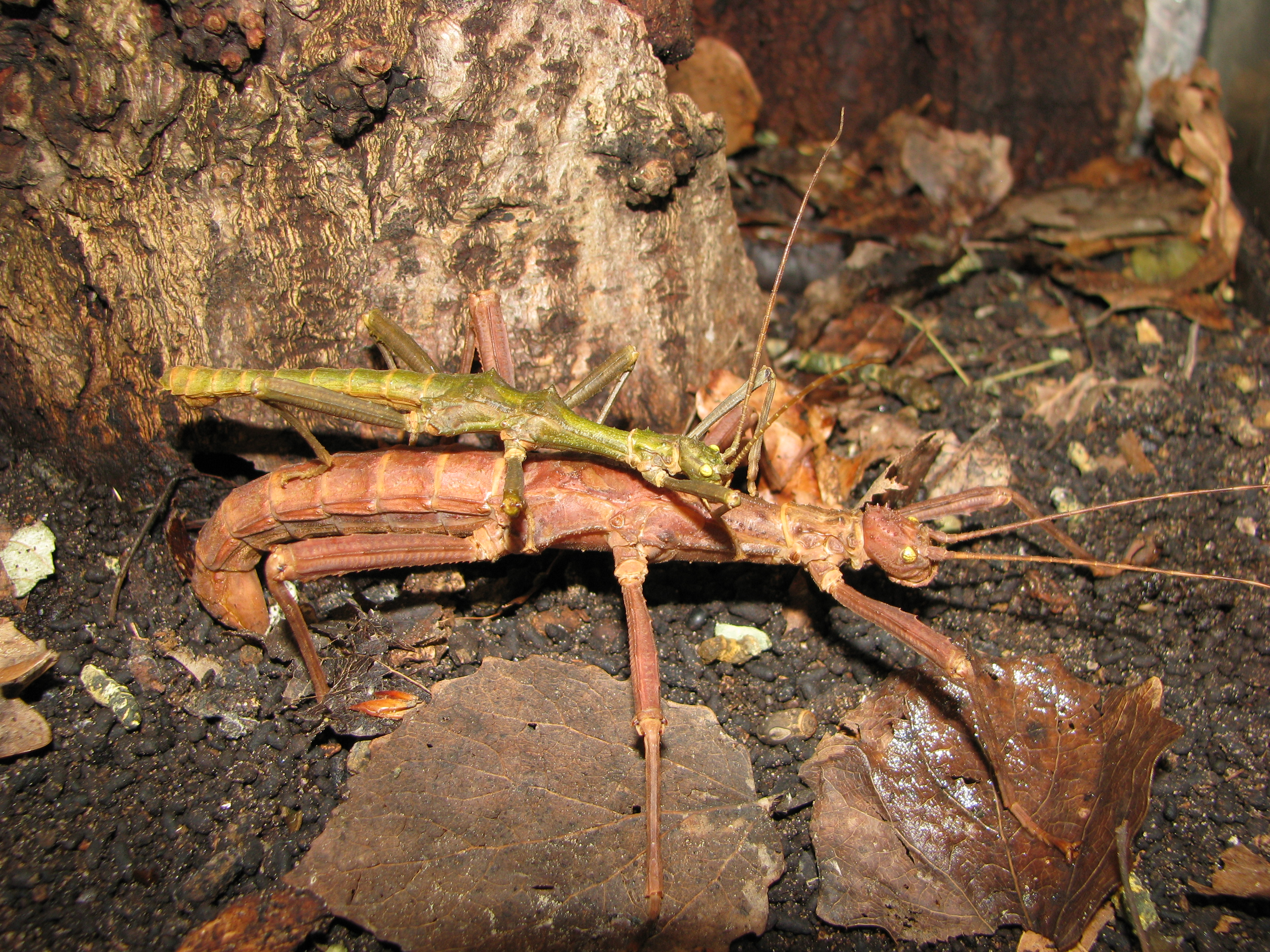
Trachyaretaon carmelae, pair

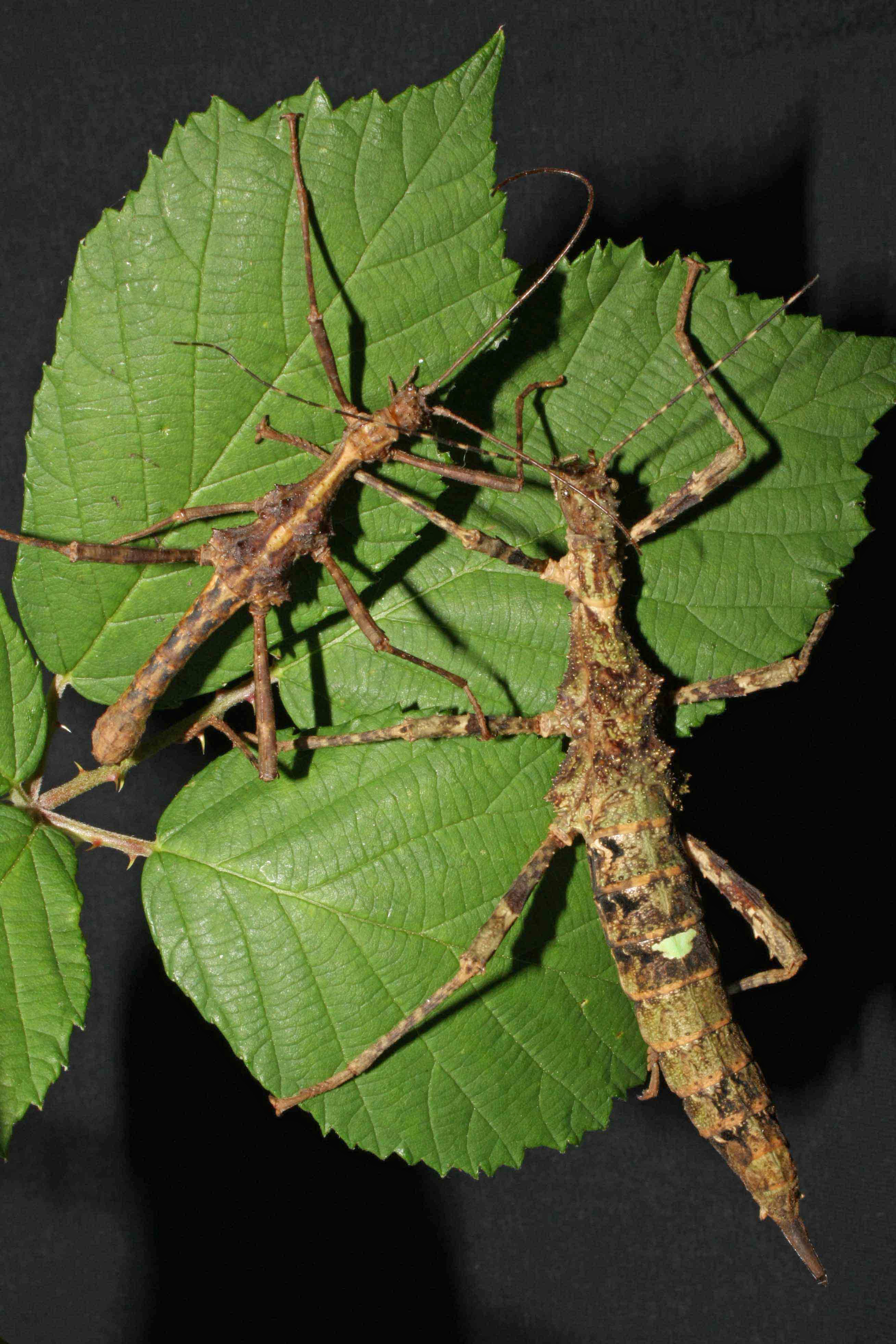
Trachyaretaon negrosanon, pair

=== Systematic background ===
Karl Brunner von Wattenwyl erected in 1893 the Obrimini (abbreviated there as Obrimi) for the already described genera Obrimus, Hoploclonia, Tisamenus, Pylaemenes, Dares and Datames (today synonym to Pylaemenes). He placed these together with the genus Heteropteryx and the Cladomorphini (abbreviated there as Cladomorphi.) in the family Cladomorphidae (now synonym to Cladomorphinae). William Forsell Kirby established the subfamily Heteropteryginae within the family Bacillidae for the genus Heteropteryx in 1896, without referring to the Obrimini from Brunner's work. In 1904 he included all the genera of today's Heteropterygidae, as well as the genus Parectatosoma in this subfamily. Josef Redtenbacher included the genera of today's Obriminae and Dataminae such as Brunner in the tribe Obrimini, while he included the genera Heteropteryx, Leocrates (today synonym to Heteropteryx) and again Parectatosoma, as well as the newly established Anisacantha in the tribe Heteropterygini leads. However, it does not indicate the relationship between the two tribes, which Kirby and Brunner had already established. Lawrence Bruner raised the Obrimini to the rank of family in 1915. In 1939 Rehn and Rehn divided the Obriminae, which they only referred as a subfamily, into the tribes Obrimini and Datamini. Klaus Günther transferred these two tribes to the subfamily Heteropteryginae in 1953. He placed their previous Southeast Asian genres in the Heteroperygini. For the Malagasy genera Parectatosoma and Anisacantha he established the Anisacanthini. Oliver Zompro raised the subfamily to the rank of family Heteropterygidae in 2004. Of the four tribes contained, three were placed in the rank of subfamilies, while the Malagasy species were transferred to the newly established family Anisacanthidae. Kirby 1896 is to be prioritized as first author for the subfamiliy of Heteropteryginae and even for the family. In 2016 Hennemann et al. reworked in an extensive work about the Heteropterygidae the tribes within the Obriminae and synonymized the tribe Eubulidini and established the Tisamenini.

=== Internal systematic ===
The three subfamilies and their tribes are shown here down to the genus level:

- Dataminae Rehn, J.A.G. & Rehn, J.W.H., 1939
  - Datamini Rehn, J.A.G. & Rehn, J.W.H., 1939
    - Dares Stål, 1875
    - Epidares Redtenbacher, 1906
    - Hainanphasma Ho, 2013
    - Microrestes Bresseel & Constant, 2020
    - Orestes Redtenbacher, 1906
    - Planispectrum Rehn, J.A.G. & Rehn, J.W.H., 1939
    - Pylaemenes Stål, 1875
    - Spinodares Bragg, 1998
    - Woodlarkia Günther, 1932
- Heteropteryginae Kirby, 1896
  - Heteropterygini Kirby, 1904
    - Haaniella Kirby, 1904
    - Heteropteryx Gray, G.R., 1835
- Obriminae Brunner von Wattenwyl, 1893
  (syn. = Therameninae Karny, 1923)
  - Obrimini Brunner von Wattenwyl, 1893
    (syn. = Eubulidini Zompro, 2004)
    (syn. = Miroceramiini Zompro, 2004)
    (syn. = Tisamenini Hennemann, Conle, Brock & Seow-Choen, 2016)
    - Aretaon Rehn, J.A.G. & Rehn, J.W.H., 1939
    - Armadolides Hennemann, 2023
    - Brasidas Rehn, J.A.G. & Rehn, J.W.H., 1939
    - Eubulides Stål, 1877
    - Heterocopus Redtenbacher, 1906
    - Mearnsiana Rehn, J.A.G. & Rehn, J.W.H., 1939
    - Miroceramia Günther, 1934
    - Obrimus Stål, 1875
    - Pterobrimus Redtenbacher, 1906
    - Stenobrimus Redtenbacher, 1906
    - Sungaya Zompro, 1996
    - Theramenes Stål, 1875
    - Tisamenus Stål, 1875
    - Trachyaretaon Rehn, J.A.G. & Rehn, J.W.H., 1939
  - Hoplocloniini Bank et al., 2021
    - Hoploclonia Stål, 1875

In the first genetic analysis for clarification of the phylogeny of a phasmid family were described by Sarah Bank et al. in sum seven mitochondrial genes and gene from the cell nucleus examined to clarify relationship within this family as well as their phylogenetic classification in other phasmid groups. As a result, the second tribe Miroceramiini set up by Zompro and the 2016 by Hennemann et al. established tribe Tisamenini of the Obriminae withdrawn. In addition, the special position of the genus Hoploclonia, known from the morphology of the ovipsitor, was also phylogenetically confirmed and accounted for by setting up a corresponding tribe. The Datamini were identified as the more original clade. In the three remaining tribes, the secondary ovipositor developed three times independently of one another. The representatives Heteropterigini form a common clade, but the genus Heteropteryx is phylogenetically placed in the middle of several lines of species currently listed in Haaniella. Following this, either Haaniella would have to be split up into several genera or withdrawn in favor of the previously described genus Heteropteryx. The latter appears more likely due to the lack of major autapomorphic differences. The relationships between the investigated Heteropterygidae genera are shown in the following cladogram:

- Heteropterygidae
  - Dataminae
    - - Epidares
      - Dares
    - - Planispectrum
      - - Pylaemenes
        - Orestes
  - - Heteropteryginae
      - Haaniella (1) = Haaniella saussurei
      - - - Haaniella (2)
          - - Haaniella (3) = Haaniella erringtoniae
            - Heteropteryx
        - Haaniella (4)
    - Obriminae
      - Hoplocloniini
        Hoploclonia
      - Obrimini
        - - Miroceramia
          - Pterobrimus
        - - - Theramenes
            - Tisamenus
          - - Stenobrimus
            - - - Obrimus
                - - Euobrimus
                  - Brasidas
              - - - Mearnsiana
                  - Aretaon
                - - Eubulides
                  - - Obrimini sp. 'Negros'
                    - - Sungaya
                      - Trachyaretaon

=== External systematic ===
In the classical taxonomy the Heteropterygidae were assigned to the disputed suborder of the Areolatae. Already in this it was led with the families Bacillidae and Anisacanthidae in the superfamily Bacilloidea. As genetic studies have shown, the representatives of the Bacilloidea are not a uniform clade. Only the relationship with the representatives of the Madagascan Anisacanthidae, which Kirby had already assumed in 1904 with regard to the genus Parectatosoma and in 1906 by Redtenbacher also in Parectatosoma and the newly established genus Anisacantha, could be confirmed. The classification of the Heteropterygidae in so far genetically examined representatives of different taxa is shown in the following cladogram:

- - Aschiphasmatidae
  - Neophasmatodea
    - Phylliidae
    - - - Heteronemiinae
        - Diapheromerinae inkc. Cladomorphus
      - - - Agathemeridae
          - Pseudophasmatidae
        - - - Anisacanthoidea
              - Achriopterini
              - Anisacanthidae
            - - - Lonchodinae
                - Necrosciinae inkl. Korinninae
              - - - Clitumnini
                  - Medaurini
                  - Gratidiini
                - - - Stephanacridini
                    - Lanceocercata
                  - - Pharnaciini incl. Prosentoria
                    - - Palophinae
                      - Cladomorphinae exkl. Cladomorphus
          - Heteropterygidae
            - Dataminae
            - - Heteropteryginae
              - Obriminae
                - Hoplocloniini
                - Obrimini
