= Pterobrimus =

Scientific classification
- Domain: Eukaryota
- Kingdom: Animalia
- Phylum: Arthropoda
- Class: Insecta
- Order: Phasmatodea
- Family: Heteropterygidae
- Tribe: Obrimini
- Genus: Pterobrimus; Redtenbacher, 1906
- Species: P. depressus

Binomial name
- Pterobrimus depressus Redtenbacher, 1906

Genus of stick insects

Pterobrimus is a monotypic genus of stick insects (Phasmatodea), containing the species Pterobrimus depressus, which is native to Fiji.

== Description ==
The females reach a length of 35 millimetres (1.4 in). The males are 25 millimetres (0.98 in) long. This makes the species one of the smallest Obrimini along with Tisamenus hebardi. Morphologically, the animals resemble the representatives of the genus Tisamenus, but differ among other things by the small, scaly, rudimentary elytra in both sexes. Pterobrimus depressus is the only Obriminae species described with wings or wing remains, along with the fully winged Miroceramia westwoodii. In common with Tisamenus, Pterobrimus has large, laterally flattened spines on the front edge of the pronotum and indicated triangle on the top of the mesonotum. In addition to the pronatal spines, there are only a few spines on the head especially in males. The body shape is somewhat reminiscent of that of flat Tisamenus representatives such as Tisamenus deplanatus, whose species name, like that of Pterobrimus depressus, already indicates the compressed body shape. The abdomen of the females ends in the secondary ovipositor typical of Obrimini. This ovipositor is formed dorsally from the supraanal plate (also called epiproct) and is serrated at the tip, atypical for Obrimini in Pterobrimus depressus. The first segment of the antennae, the scapus, has an apical outer spine, which is otherwise only found in the representatives of the subfamily Dataminae.

== Distribution area ==
Fiji was already mentioned as a type locality by Redtenbacher in the species description. Since this locality is far to the east of the range of the other Heteropterygidae, the occurrence there and thus the type locality was occasionally questioned. A specimen collected by Daniel Otte in Naitasiri Province on Viti Levu finally confirmed Fiji as distribution of this species.

== Taxonomy ==
Pterobrimus depressus was described in 1906 by Redtenbacher in the genus Pterobrimus, which was specially established for this species. While the species name refers to the flat, compressed body shape of the species, the genus name is a combination of "ptero" for Ancient Greek πτερόν pterón "wing" and "Obrimus". Redtenbacher chooses this name because of the rudimentary wings and the proximity of the genus to Obrimus, or more precisely to the tribe Obrimini, in which he places the species. He calls the genus a transition between Heterocopus and Tisamenus and described both sexes using specimens from the Zoological Museum in Hamburg. Of the specimens mentioned, a damaged male classified as syntype can be found there. A severely damaged female syntype is deposited in the Natural History Museum in Vienna.

The affiliation of the genus to the Obrimini was doubted very early on. James Abram Garfield Rehn and his son John William Holman Rehn suspect that the genus belongs to a different tribe. The tribes in question were raised in 2004 by Oliver Zompro to the status of separate subfamilies. He places the genus Pterobrimus in the tribe Eubulidini set up by him within the Obriminae. Frank H. Hennemann et al. synonymized this tribe and placed the genus in the tribe Tisamenini set up by them. Sarah Bank et al. were able to clarify the relationships within the family in a study on the spread of the Heteropterygidae based on genetic analysis. They synonymized the Tisamenini and confirmed the assignment of Redtenbacher to the Obrimini as well as the type locality he specified on the basis of more recent finds. The full-winged Miroceramia was identified as the sister genus. Both genera together form a sister clade to all other Obrimini. The genus Tisamenus mentioned by Redtenbacher is also closely related. The monotypic genus Heterocopus was not part of this study.
