= Austrosalomona falcata =

Scientific classification
- Kingdom: Animalia
- Phylum: Arthropoda
- Clade: Pancrustacea
- Class: Insecta
- Order: Orthoptera
- Suborder: Ensifera
- Family: Tettigoniidae
- Genus: Austrosalomona
- Species: A. falcata

Binomial name
- Austrosalomona falcata Redtenbacher, 1891

Synonyms
- Lobaspis falcata; Nicsara falcata

Species of insect

Austrosalomona falcata, the olive-green coastal katydid, is a species of insect found in eastern Australia and is introduced to New Zealand. The habitat includes urban gardens, rural areas and grassy woodlands. Food consists of flowers and fruits. The males communicate by stridulation, where one forewing is scraped against the other.
