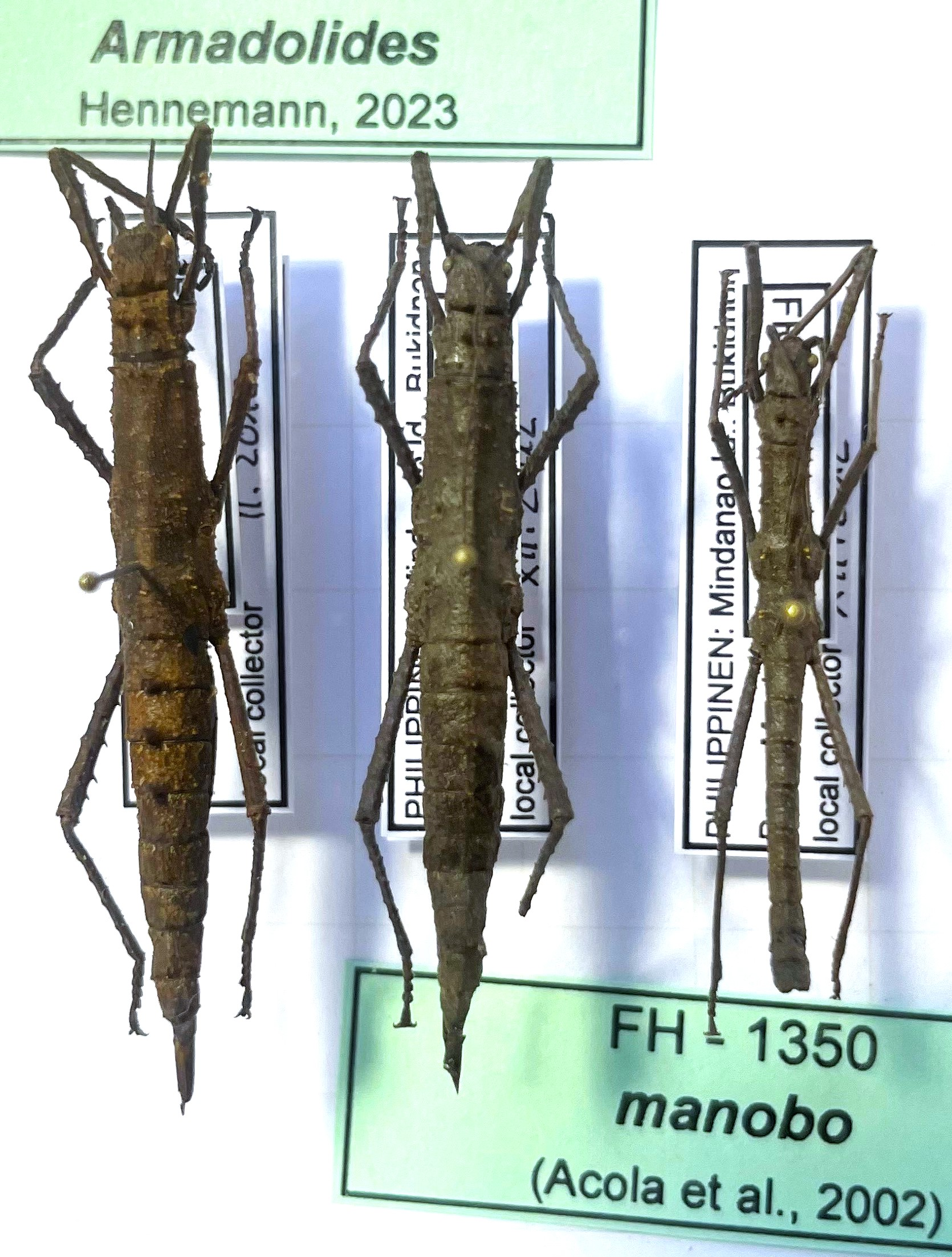
- Armadolides manobo from te collection of Frank H. Hennemann

Scientific classification
- Kingdom: Animalia
- Phylum: Arthropoda
- Class: Insecta
- Order: Phasmatodea
- Family: Heteropterygidae
- Subfamily: Obriminae
- Tribe: Obrimini
- Genus: Armadolides; Hennemann, 2023
- Species: A. manobo

Binomial name
- Armadolides manobo (Acola, Naredo & Eusebio, 2022)

Synonyms
- Eubulides manobo Acola, Naredo & Eusebio, 2022

= Armadolides =

Genus of stick insects

Armadolides is a monotypic genus of stick insects (Phasmatodea), containing the species Armadolides manobo, which is native to the Philippine island of Mindanao.

== Description ==
The wingless animals in both sexes closely resemble those of the closely related genus Eubulides, but are smaller on average and differ in the spines (meso- and metanotals) present on the posterior meso- and metanotum and a distinct, central pair of spines on the pronotum. In addition, on the terga three to five of the abdomen there is a large, spine-like protrusion in the middle of the posterior area (posteromedial). As in Eubulides the ovipositor of the females is clearly curved.

The first known female, which comes from the region around Mount Apo and was described as holotype of Armadolides manobo, is significantly larger at 60 millimetres (2.4 in) than the females from the province of Bukidnon, which are only 43 to 46 millimetres (1.7 to 1.8 in) long. The male paratypes from the region around Mount Apo are also larger. Although there are four specimens mentioned, only one total length of 41 millimetres (1.6 in) is given. The four males examined from the province of Bukidnon are also smaller. Here too, only one length of 32 millimetres (1.3 in) is given. Overall, the specimens from Bukidnon are not only smaller, but also slimmer and their posterior meso- and metanotals are more pronounced and more spiny.

== Occurrence and lifestyle ==
Armadolides manobo has been recorded on the Philippine island of Mindanao in the province Cotabato, where they were found in the area around Mount Mahuso in the Apo range. Other, slightly smaller and slimmer animals were found in the province of Bukidnon in Intavas in the municipality of Sumilao, in Cabanglasan, on Mount Kitanglad and in Valencia.

The natural food plants of the species include Saurauia species on which the animals have been found. The projectile-shaped eggs, laid in the soil using the curved ovipositor, resemble those of Eubulides. They are about 5.2 to 5.5 millimetres (0.20 to 0.22 in) long, 1.8 to 2.25 millimetres (0.071 to 0.089 in) wide and 2.7 to 3.0 millimetres (0.11 to 0.12 in) high and brownish dark grey. The micropylar plate is large and almost as long as the capsule. Its anterior end is broad, almost rectangular in shape with rounded corners. The two posterior-lateral extensions become narrower towards the end and reach almost to the end of the egg capsule. The lid (operculum) is slightly elliptical, flattened and slopes slightly towards the dorsal side, creating a distinct opercular angle. In its center is a mountain of bristles.

== Taxonomy ==
In 2022, Mescel S. Acola, Jeremy Carlo B. Naredo and Orlando L. Eusebio described Eubulides manobo from one female and four males from the Cotabato Province on Mindanao in the genus Eubulides. The female was deposited as holotype, the four males as paratypes at the Museum of the Central Mindanao University. The specific name is dedicated to the Manobo people, an indigenous peoples on Mindanao. As early as 2023, Frank H. Hennemann transferred the species to the genus Armadolides, which was specially established for this species. For his research, he had eleven females, four males and one female nymph from various locations in the province of Bukidnon. Of these, nine females, three males and the female nymph are deposited in the Museum of Natural Sciences in Brussels. The remaining specimens come from his collection. The neuter genus name is a combination of the Filipino word "armado" for spiny or armed and the ending "lides", which refers to the closely related genus Eubulides. Thus it means "spiny Eubulides".
