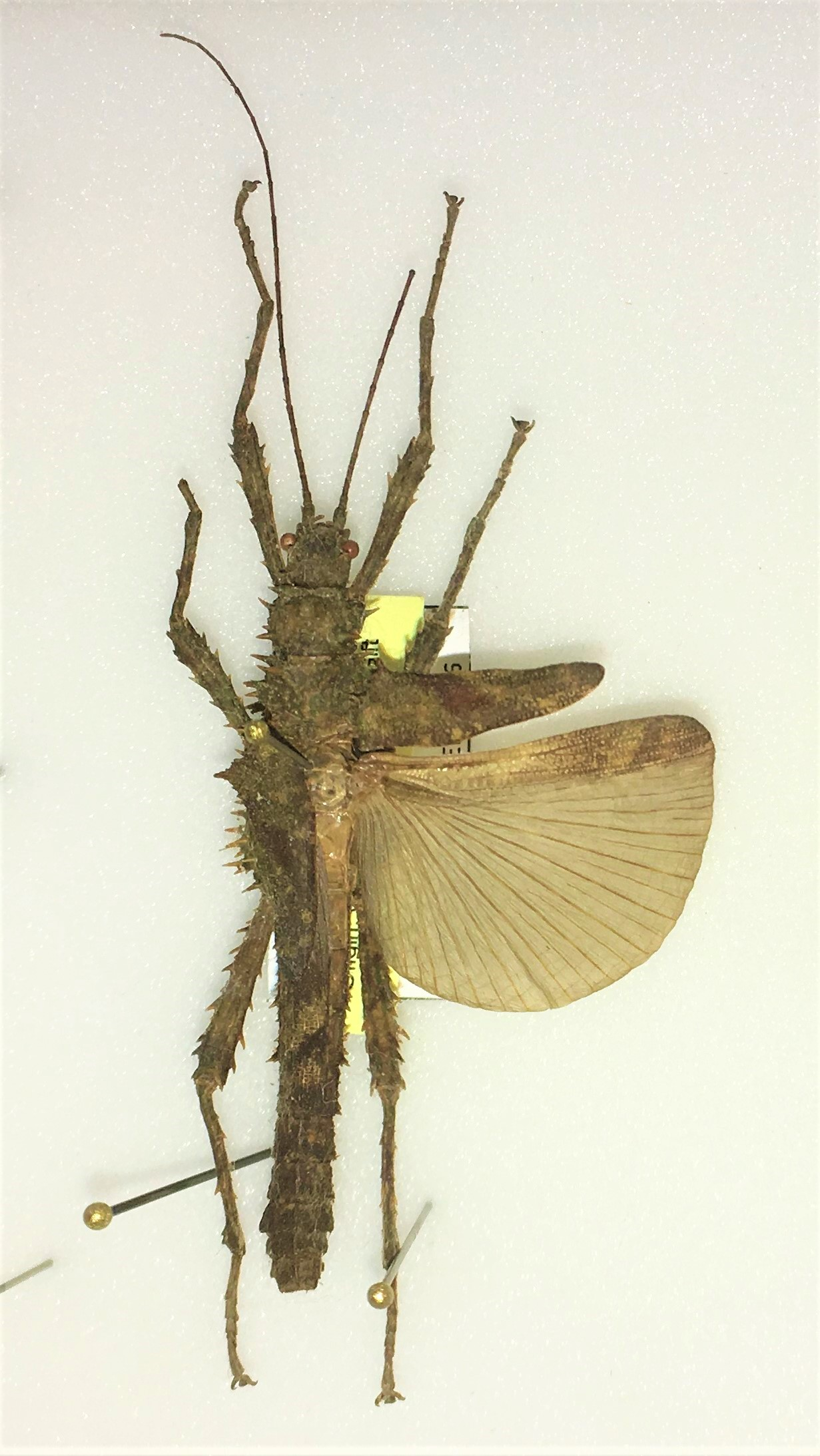
- Miroceramia westwoodii, preserved male

Scientific classification
- Domain: Eukaryota
- Kingdom: Animalia
- Phylum: Arthropoda
- Class: Insecta
- Order: Phasmatodea
- Family: Heteropterygidae
- Tribe: Obrimini
- Genus: Miroceramia; Günther, 1934
- Species: M. westwoodii

Binomial name
- Miroceramia westwoodii (Bates, 1865)

Synonyms
- Miroceramia pterobrimus Günther, 1934

= Miroceramia =

Genus of stick insects

Miroceramia is a monotypic genus of stick insects, containing Miroceramia westwoodii as the only described species. It is the only fully winged one of the subfamily Obriminae.

== Characteristics ==
The species and thus also the genus differ from all other Obriminae by the presence of fully developed wings, the very short and medial extended mesothorax, which is hardly longer than the prothorax, as well as the very long tarsi, which are more than half as long as the corresponding tibia. In the females, the downward directed secondary ovipositor is unique. The eggs can be distinguished from those of related species by their strong longitudinal curvature, whereby the capsule dorsal convex and ventrally concave.

With about 4.6 centimetres (1.8 in) in the male, and 7 to 7.3 centimetres (2.8 to 2.9 in) in length in the female, Miroceramia westwoodii is a medium-sized Obriminae species. Their most noticeable feature is the presence of wings in both sexes. The thorax is prickly on the surface of the pro- and mesonotum as well as the pleura. The pronotum is trapezoidal and much narrower at the front edge than at the back. The mesothorax is noticeably shortened and only about 1.2 times longer than the prothorax. The antennae are long and slender. They consist of 26 segments. Both fore and hind wings are present, with the hind wings protruding beyond the anterior ones. The forewings are designed as tegmina and reach about two thirds of the length of the hind wings (alae). The hind wings extend to the sixth or seventh segment of the abdomen. The tegmina are elongated and narrow towards the end. At the base they are strongly convex and equipped with two spines. The hind wings are ocher and translucent in the anal field. According to a note from M. J. D. Brendell on the label of a male he collected in the Manusela National Park on Seram Island, which is deposited in the Natural History Museum, London, these animals are capable of stridulation using their wings. In females, segments two to four of the abdomen are roughly the same width and about twice as wide as they are long. The segments behind it gradually taper towards the tip. The secondary ovipositor is long and strongly curved downwards. Its upper part, the epiproct, is blunt and shorter than the lower part. The longer, ventral part of the ovipositor, called subgenital plate, ends with a point. The abdomen of the males is approximately parallel. Their second to seventh segments are almost equally wide and slightly wider than they are long. The segments are pointed at the rear, outer corners and there is a slender spine on the second to fifth segment.

== Distribution ==
The few representatives of the species found so far come from the area of the Wallace line, more precisely from the Moluccas island Seram and from the north of Sulawesi.

== Taxonomy ==
The species was described in 1865 by Henry Walter Bates as Heteropteryx westwoodii. The specific epithet is dedicated to John Obadiah Westwood. An adult female is deposited as a holotype in the zoological collection of the Oxford University Museum of Natural History. William Forsell Kirby transferred the species to the genus Haaniella established by him in 1904.

Klaus Günther described a species called Miroceramia pterobrimus using a male holotype. The species name pterobrimus means winged Obrimus and indicates both the proximity to the already known representatives of the Obriminae, as well as the peculiarity of this species, namely the presence of wings. The holotype is deposited at the State Museum of Zoology, Dresden.

In 1998 Philip Edward Bragg introduced Miroceramia pterobrimus as synonym to Haaniella westwoodii. Since he synonymized the species, but the genus remained valid, the newly combined name Miroceramia westwoodii resulted. Type species for the genus Miroceramia is the synonymized Miroceramia pterobrimus.

Due to the clear differences between Miroceramia westwoodii and almost all other Obriminae, Oliver Zompro established the tribe Miroceramiini for this species in 2004. He also included the monotypical genus Mearnsiana, which up to now was only known from the juvenile female holotype of Mearnsiana bullosa. After their adult wingless Imago became known and after a closer comparison of their morphology, Mearnsiana bullosa was included in the Tribus Obrimini convicted. As a result, the tribe Miroceramiini initially became monotypical, before it was made a synonym for the Obrimini in 2021 after the publication of genetic studies. The monotypical genus Pterobrimus was identified by this investigation as the sister genus of Miroceramia.
