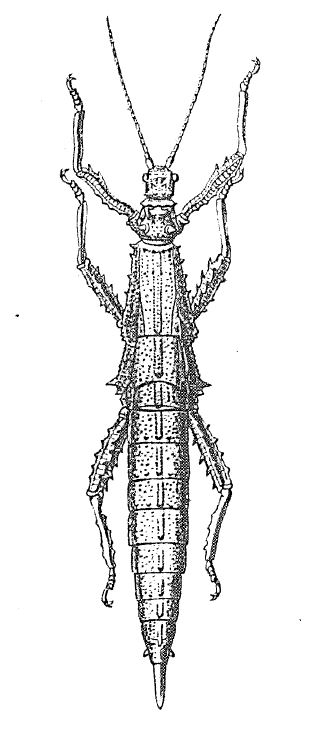
- Heterocopus leprosus, picture of a female from the original description by Redtenbacher

Scientific classification
- Domain: Eukaryota
- Kingdom: Animalia
- Phylum: Arthropoda
- Class: Insecta
- Order: Phasmatodea
- Family: Heteropterygidae
- Tribe: Obrimini
- Genus: Heterocopus; Redtenbacher, 1906
- Species: H. leprosus

Binomial name
- Heterocopus leprosus Redtenbacher, 1906

= Heterocopus =

Genus of stick insects

Heterocopus is a monotypic stick insect genus, containing Heterocopus leprosus as the only valid species.

== Description ==
The few known specimens of the genus are medium-sized and completely wingless, hardly spined species. They are similar to the genera Eubulides and Theramenes. In contrast to these, the females of Heterocopus do not have a curved, but a straight and relatively long secondary ovipositor. They reach a length of 57 to 69 millimetres (2.2 to 2.7 in). From the mesonotum over the metanotum to the end of the abdomen there is a distinct ridge running down the middle of the body. Only the spines above the rear coxae (supracoxal spines) are recognizable on the upper side of the body. On the underside, smaller spines are present on both the sternites of the thorax and the abdomen. The legs are more or less spined on the femurs and tibiae. Males are around 44 millimetres (1.7 in) long.

== Taxonomy ==
Josef Redtenbacher described the genus Heterocopus in 1906 for Heterocopus leprosus, which he also described based on a female. At the same time he transferred the 1859 by John Obadiah Westwood as Acanthoderus ranarius described species in this genus. The latter was already in 1939 by James Abram Garfield Rehn and his son John W. H. Rehn transferred in the genus Ilocano. Thus, with Heterocopus leprosus, Rehn and Rehn name only one species in the genus Heterocopus. Ilocano has been a synonym since 2021 to Tisamenus, the species described by Westwood has been included in this genus since 2004 and consequently as Tisamenus ranarius . Two females preserved in alcohol in the Natural History Museum, Vienna and another dry prepared female in the Zoological Museum Hamburg deposited. All three originally come from the Museum Godeffroy in Hamburg. A male of Heterocopus leprosus was first described in 1950 by Cornelis Joseph Maria Willemse. It is deposited in the Bernice P. Bishop Museum in Honolulu. Already in 1937 Klaus Günther described with Heterocopus carli another species of the genus, which differs from Heterocopus leprosus in the absence of spines on the femurs and tibiae. For each of these, a male and female syntype are deposited in the State Museum of Zoology, Dresden. Oliver Zompro transferred the species to the genus Pachymorpha in 1998, a genus with more stick-like insects. Since it is kept there to this day, Heterocopus is still monotypic.

== Distribution area ==
The three female syntypes are from the Palau Islands in the east of Micronesia.
