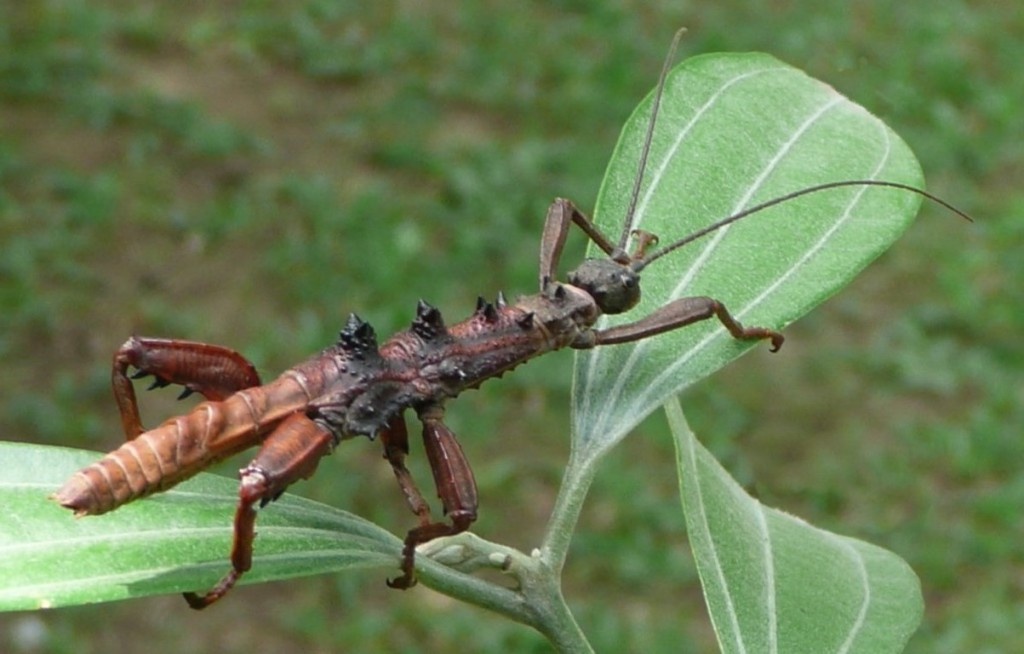
- Theramenes mandirigma, male

Scientific classification
- Kingdom: Animalia
- Phylum: Arthropoda
- Clade: Pancrustacea
- Class: Insecta
- Order: Phasmatodea
- Superfamily: Bacilloidea
- Family: Heteropterygidae
- Subfamily: Obriminae
- Tribe: Obrimini
- Genus: Theramenes; Stål, 1875

Type species
- Theramenes olivaceus (Westwood, 1859)

Species
- Theramenes dromedarius; Theramenes exiguus; Theramenes letiranti; Theramenes mandirigma; Theramenes olivaceus

= Theramenes (insect) =

Genus of insects

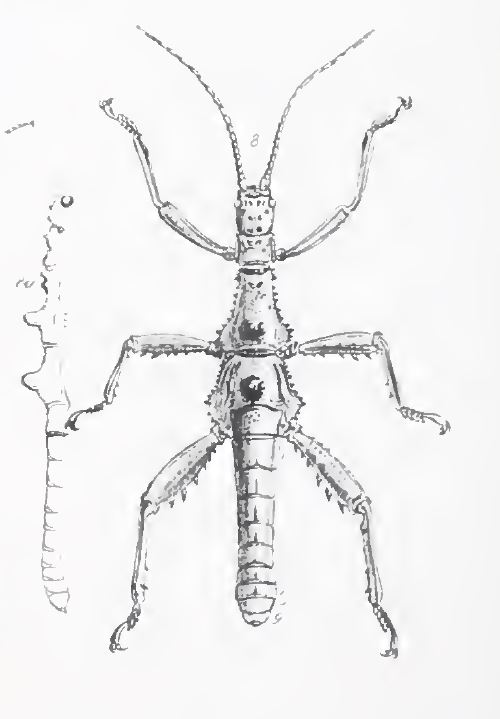
Theramenes olivaceus, male from Westwood 1859

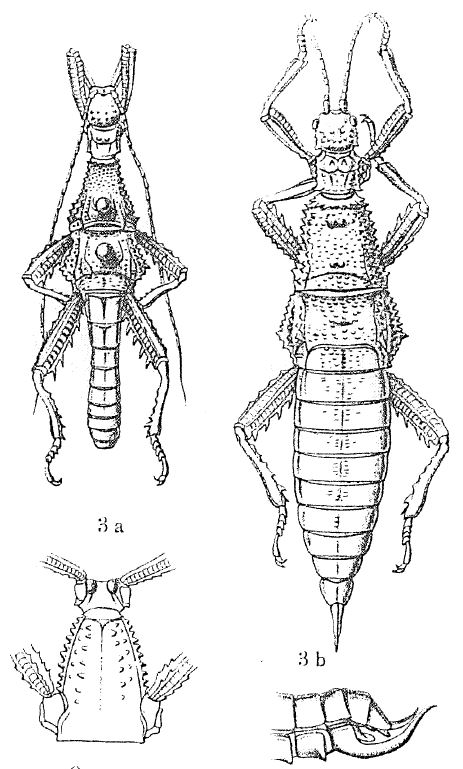
Theramenes dromedarius, pair from Redtenbacher, 1906

Theramenes is a genus of medium-sized stick insects in the tribe Obrimini, which is native to the Philippines and to the Indonesian Talaud Islands.

== Description ==
The males of the different species reach lengths of 31 to 58 millimetres (1.2 to 2.3 in). Characteristic and thus autapomorphic are their mostly pronounced hump-like elevations on the rear meso- and metanotum. The 60 to 85 millimetres (2.4 to 3.3 in) long females have a strongly curved ovipositor, which is found similar only in the females of the genus Eubulides. As with these, the abdomen is entirely free of spines or other elevations. Striking are the strong femurs, which have a square cross-section and are reminiscent of those of the genus Eurycantha. At least the hind femurs are heavily spined. In addition to light and dark brown species, there is also an olive-green species, Theramenes olivaceus, whose basic color is reminiscent of Mearnsiana bullosa.

The eggs are elongated, laterally compressed and therefore oval in cross-section. They are 6.5 to 7 millimetres (0.26 to 0.28 in) long, about 2 millimetres (0.079 in) wide and 2.2 to 2.5 millimetres (0.087 to 0.098 in) high. The micropylar plate runs parallel-sided almost over the entire length of the egg and splits in a Y-shape narrow the lower pole. The micropyle can be seen at the vertex of the angle formed by the two lower arms. The lid (operculum) is oval and stretches convex over the upper pole.

== Distribution area ==
The species of this genus are mostly native to various Philippine islands. Thus Theramenes dromedarius and Theramenes letiranti was found on Mindanao, Theramenes mandirigma on Cebu and Theramenes exiguus on Panay. The locality given for the holotype of Theramenes olivaceus with Ceylon (today Sri Lanka) is probably a result of confused labeling. The Talaud Islands were assumed to be the actual location early on, from where all other finds of the species originate.

== Taxonomy ==
Carl Stål presents the genus Theramenes rather casually, after listing typical characteristics of Eurycantha, why the species described in 1859 by John O. Westwood under the basionym Eurycantha olivacea does not belong to this genus. He names it Theramenes olivaceus, which is equivalent to the description of the genus. The genus name, like that of many genera described at the time, refers to a person from ancient Greece, in this case the politician Theramenes. Type species by monotype is Theramenes olivaceus. As early as 1877, Stål described a second species in this genus, Theramenes dromedarius. Both species have each been described in a male. Only Josef Redtenbacher described the female of Theramenes dromedarius in 1906 and depicts both sexes. Heinrich Hugo Karny presented the subfamily Therameninae in 1923 and synonymized the Obrimini or the Obrimidae with this. In the introduction to his work, he justified the renaming with the fact that Carl Brunner von Wattenwyl and Redtenbacher did not always take into account the genera described first when naming the subfamilies they established - and as such he also regards the tribes described by both had. In the case of the Obriminae this is not true, since both the genus Obrimus and Theramenes were established at the same time by Stål in 1875. The name Therameninae was withdrawn by Klaus Günther in 1929 and is therefore a synonym for Obriminae. Theramenes dromedarius was synonymized with Theramenes olivaceus by Günther in 1935 and revalidated by James Abram Garfield Rehn and his son John W. H. Rehn in 1939, so that the genus was again regarded as monotypic from 1935 to 1939. In their description of Theramenes mandirigma in 2001, Oliver Zompro and Orlando L. Eusebio synonymized Theramenes dromedarius a second time with Theramenes olivaceus. It was only in 2016 Frank Hennemann et al. confirmed their validity by comparing the male holotypes of both species. In 2003, Theramenes exiguus was described, and in 2023 Theramenes letiranti, the smallest species of the genus.

Valid species are:

- Theramenes dromedarius Stål, 1877
- Theramenes exiguus Hennemann & Conle, 2003
- Theramenes letiranti Hennemann, 2023
- Theramenes mandirigma Zompro & Eusebio, 2001
- Theramenes olivaceus (Westwood, 1859) - type species (as Eurycantha olivacea Westwood, 1859)

In 2004, Zompro divided the Obriminae, which he raised to the rank of a subfamily, into three tribes and listed Theramenes here in the tribe Eubulidini, in which he included the genus Tisamenus, among others. Hennemann et al. synonymized this tribe 2016 with the Obrimini in which they also transferred Theramenes. In their work based on genetic analysis to clarify the phylogeny of the Heteropterygidae, Sarah Bank et al. also Theramenes exiguus, as well as another Theramenes species examined. This investigation showed that Tisamenus is the sister genus of Theramenes.

== Captivity and way of life ==
On August 6, 2015, Franz Seidenschwarz found a pair of Theramenes mandirigma and thus also the first female of this species, of which only three males were known until then. He kept the collected specimens in captivity and was able to determine the time from mating to oviposition with 23 days and the time from oviposition to hatching of the nymphs with 83 days. He also described the females, the eggs and the nymphs, which are 13 millimetres (0.51 in) long when they hatch, and documented some food plants with Diospyros philippinensis and at least two other Diospyros species as well as Swietenia macrophylla. The further breeding of this species has not been successful and the other representatives of the genus are not being bred either.
