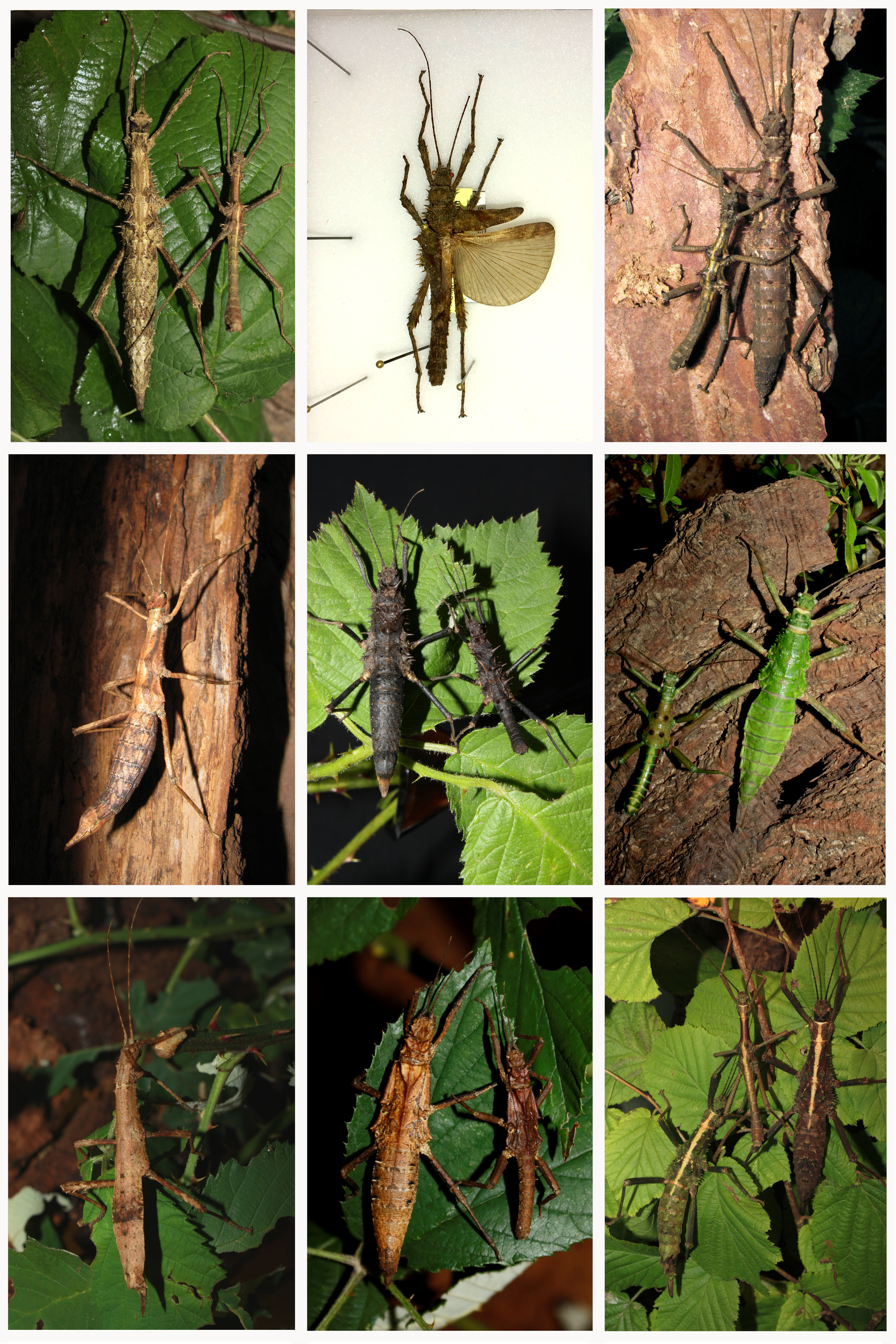
- Different species of Heteropterygidae

Scientific classification
- Kingdom: Animalia
- Phylum: Arthropoda
- Clade: Pancrustacea
- Class: Insecta
- Order: Phasmatodea
- Family: Heteropterygidae
- Subfamily: Obriminae; Brunner von Wattenwyl, 1893

Tribes
- Hoplocloniini; Obrimini
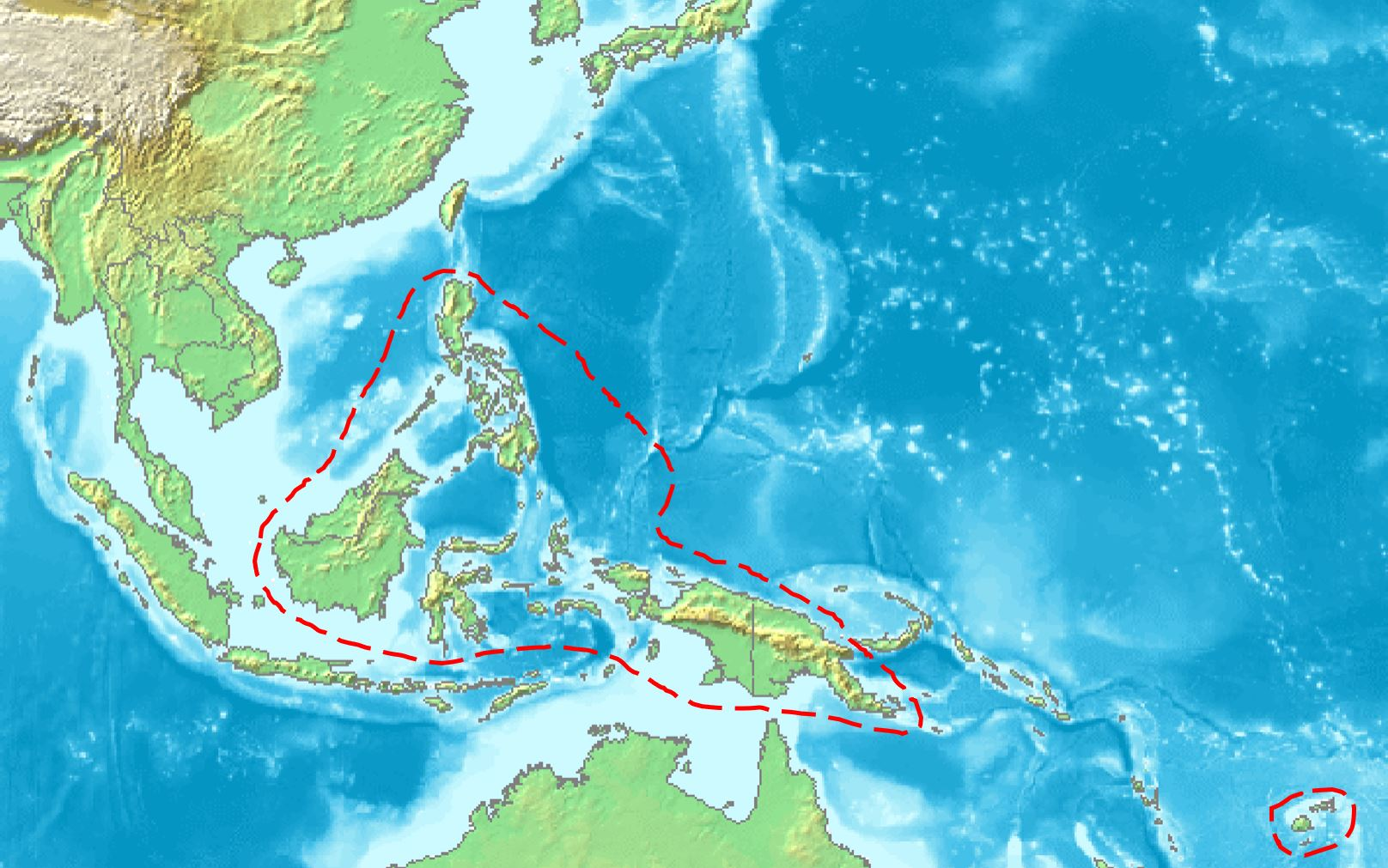
- Range of the Obriminae

Synonyms
- Therameninae Karny, 1923

= Obriminae =

Obriminae Temporal range: 50–0 Ma Early Eocene to present

Family of stick insects

The Obriminae are the most species-rich subfamily of the Phasmatodea family Heteropterygidae native to Southeast Asia. It is divided into two tribe.

== Taxonomy ==
The tribe Obrimini was created by Brunner von Wattenwyl in 1893 for the genera Obrimus, Hoploclonia, Tisamenus, Pylaemenes, Dares and Datames (today synonym to Pylaemenes) (abbreviated there as Obrimi.). Lawrence Bruner raised the Obrimini to the rank of a family in 1915. Heinrich Hugo Karny renamed the Obrimini or the Obrimidae in 1923 to Therameninae. In the introduction to his work he justified the renaming by saying that Brunner von Wattenwyl and Josef Redtenbacher when naming the subfamilies they established – and as such he also considers the tribes described by both of them – not always taking into account the genera described first. At least in the case of the Obriminae this is not true, since both the genus Obrimus and Theramenes was built in 1875 by Carl Stål. The name Therameninae was withdrawn again in 1929 by Klaus Günther and is therefore a synonym for Obriminae. In 1939 the Obriminae, now referred to as a subfamily, were split up by James Abram Garfield Rehn and his son John William Holman Rehn into the Obrimini and Datamini tribes. Günther transferred both tribes to the Heteropteryginae subfamily in 1953. In 2004 Oliver Zompro elevated this subfamily to the rank of a family and the tribe included to the rank of subfamilies or, in the case of the Anisacanthini, to the rank of a family of their own. He divided the new subfamily Obriminae into three tribes. In addition to the Obrimini, these were the Eubulidini and the Miroceramiini. The two new tribes were synonymed in 2016 by Frank H. Hennemann et al. and 2021 by Sarah Bank et al. with the Obrimini. The 2016 by Hennemann et al. established tribe Tisamenini was synonymous in 2021. With the establishment of the Hoplocloniini, the anatomical peculiarity of the secondary ovipositor of the genus Hoploclonia was taken into account. This special status was also confirmed by genetic analysis investigations.
Thus the Obriminae consist of two valid tribes. One is the monotypical tribus Hoplocloniini, with the only genus Hoploclonia and the other tribus is Obrimini with now 14 genera and 70 valid species.

== Description ==
The Obriminae can reach very different sizes with almost 3 centimetres (1.2 in) in Tisamenus hebardi and up to 13 centimetres (5.1 in) in length in Trachyaretaon carmelae. The sensory fields present in all Heteropterygidae are to be found in pairs in the Obriminae in the front area of the prosternum. In adult females the abdomen is widened and significantly increased by the eggs that are permanently and often produced in large numbers. Their abdomen ends in a pointed secondary ovipositor that surrounds the actual ovipositor. It is ventral formed from the eighth abdominal sternite, which is here named subgenital plate, or also called operculum. Dorsally it consists in the Obrimini by the eleventh abdominal tergum called the supraanal plate or Epiproct and in the Hoplocloniini from the tenth tergum. This peculiarity means that the secondary ovipositor must have developed independently of one another twice within the Obriminae. The abdomen of the smaller males is round in cross-section and thinnest in the middle of abdomen. Except in Miroceramia westwoodii and in rudiments in Pterobrimus depressus, the only known representatives of their genera, the Obrimini have no wings.

The body is often covered with numerous spines, more or less blunt thorns or tubercles, which can be found mainly on the upper side of the head and thorax. Their characteristics can be very different, and their arrangement is mostly species-specific and is often used to identify and delimit the species. This method, known as acanthotaxy, was developed in 1939 by Rehn and Rehn for the Obriminae.

== Distribution area ==
The distribution area of the Obriminae includes Borneo, where both Hoplocloniini and Obrimini can be found. The latter are also widespread to the east on the Philippines, Sulawesi, most of the Moluccas islands, New Guinea and Viti Levu.
