= James A. G. Rehn =

American entomologist (1881–1965)

James Abram Garfield Rehn (October 26, 1881 – January 25, 1965) was an American entomologist who was a specialist on the New World Orthoptera. He worked at the Academy of Natural Sciences of Philadelphia, making several collection expeditions around the world on their behalf.

Rehn was born in Philadelphia to William and Cornela Loud Rehn. He studied at the Public Industrial Art School and at the Pennsylvania Academy of Fine Arts. He took an interest in natural history at a young age and along with several others of his age were encouraged by Charles Willison Johnson, curator of the Wagner Free Institute of Science. He joined the Academy of Natural Sciences of Philadelphia as a Jessup student in 1900. Here he met many other naturalists including the ornithologist Witmer Stone from whom Rehn received informal training. Rehn met a 16 year old Morgan Hebard in 1903 and the two maintained a close association until Hebard's death in 1946. Hebard graduated from Yale and after working in the family business, he quit in 1911 and dedicated his life to entomology. Hebard and Rehn made numerous trips together across America collecting orthoptera. The work on a monograph by the two was postponed after arthritis hit Hebard in 1930. Rehn eventually began work in 1954 and the first volume was published in 1961 along with Harold J. Grant. He was an editor of the Transactions of the American Entomological Society from 1917 to 1924. His son John William Holman Rehn was briefly interested in entomology and published some papers with his father but gave it up for a career in the US Army.

== See also ==
- Category:Taxa named by James Abram Garfield Rehn
