= Genetic analysis =

Study and research of genes

Genetic analysis is the overall process of studying and researching in fields of science that involve genetics and molecular biology. There are a number of applications that are developed from this research, and these are also considered parts of the process. The base system of analysis revolves around general genetics. Basic studies include identification of genes and inherited disorders. This research has been conducted for centuries on both a large-scale physical observation basis and on a more microscopic scale. Genetic analysis can be used generally to describe methods both used in and resulting from the sciences of genetics and molecular biology, or to applications resulting from this research.

Genetic analysis may be done to identify genetic/inherited disorders and also to make a differential diagnosis in certain somatic diseases such as cancer. Genetic analyses of cancer include detection of mutations, fusion genes, and DNA copy number changes.

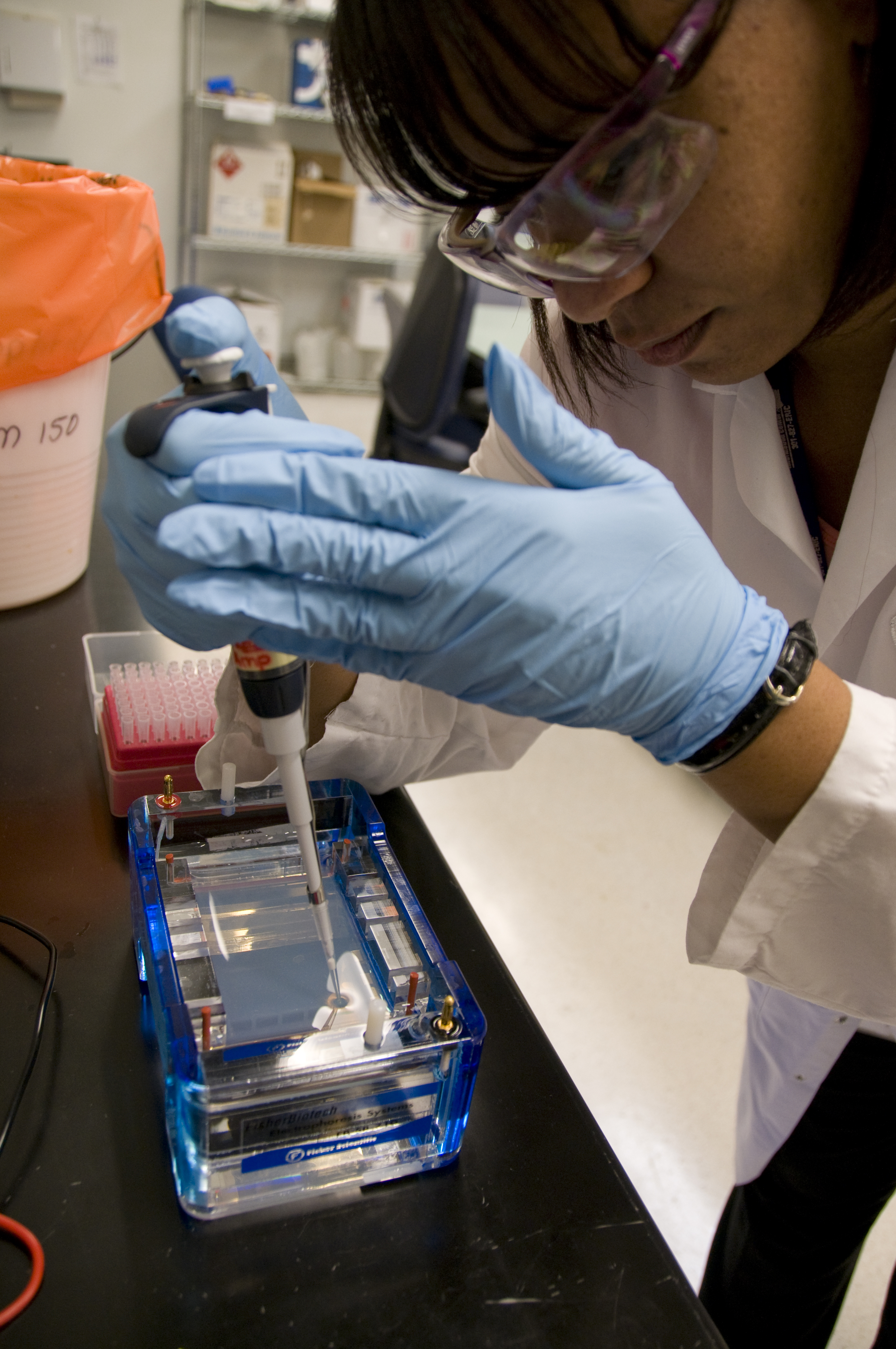
FDA microbiologist prepares DNA samples for gel electrophoresis analysis

== History ==
Much of the research that set the foundation of genetic analysis began in prehistoric times. Early humans found that they could practice selective breeding to improve crops and animals. They also identified inherited traits in humans that were eliminated over the years. The many genetic analyses gradually evolved over time.

=== Mendelian research ===
Modern genetic analysis began in the mid-1800s with research conducted by Gregor Mendel. Mendel, who is known as the "father of modern genetics", was inspired to study variation in plants. Between 1856 and 1863, Mendel cultivated and tested some 29,000 pea plants (i.e., Pisum sativum). This study showed that one in four pea plants had purebred recessive alleles, two out of four were hybrid and one out of four were purebred dominant. His experiments led him to make two generalizations, the Law of Segregation and the Law of Independent Assortment, which later became known as Mendel's Laws of Inheritance. Lacking the basic understanding of heredity, Mendel observed various organisms and first utilized genetic analysis to find that traits were inherited from parents and those traits could vary between children. Later, it was found that units within each cell are responsible for these traits. These units are called genes. Each gene is defined by a series of amino acids that create proteins responsible for genetic traits.

== Types ==
Genetic analyses include molecular technologies such as PCR, RT-PCR, DNA sequencing, and DNA microarrays, and cytogenetic methods such as karyotyping and fluorescence in situ hybridisation.

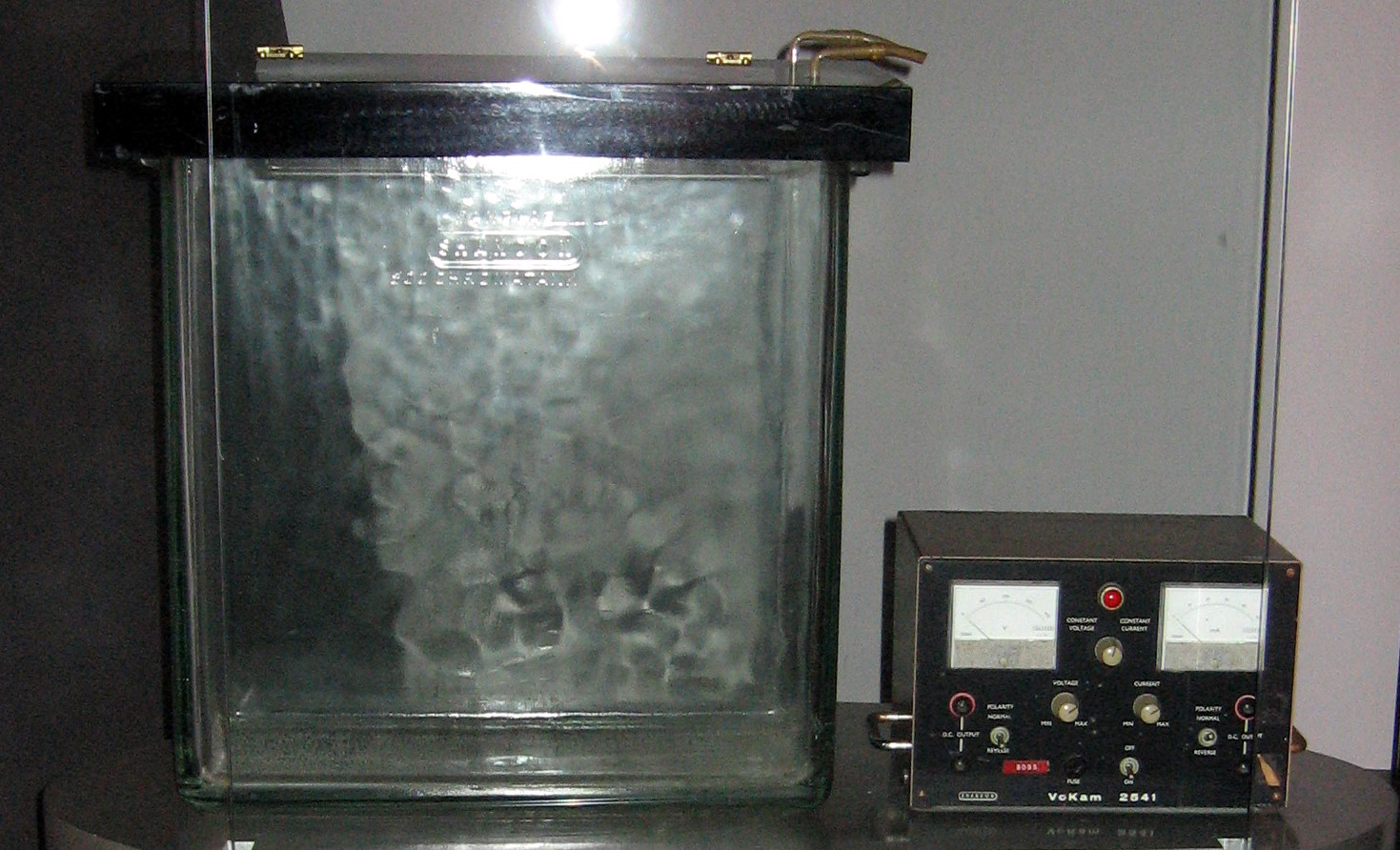
Electrophoresis apparatus

=== DNA sequencing ===
DNA sequencing is essential to the applications of genetic analysis. This process is used to determine the order of nucleotide bases. Each molecule of DNA is made from adenine, guanine, cytosine and thymine, which determine what function the genes will possess. This was first discovered during the 1970s. DNA sequencing encompasses biochemical methods for determining the order of the nucleotide bases, adenine, guanine, cytosine, and thymine, in a DNA oligonucleotide. By generating a DNA sequence for a particular organism, you are determining the patterns that make up genetic traits and in some cases behaviors.

Sequencing methods have evolved from relatively laborious gel-based procedures to modern automated protocols based on dye labelling and detection in capillary electrophoresis that permit rapid large-scale sequencing of genomes and transcriptomes. Knowledge of DNA sequences of genes and other parts of the genome of organisms has become indispensable for basic research studying biological processes, as well as in applied fields such as diagnostic or forensic research. The advent of DNA sequencing has significantly accelerated biological research and discovery.

=== Cytogenetics ===
Cytogenetics is a branch of genetics that is concerned with the study of the structure and function of the cell, especially the chromosomes. Polymerase chain reaction studies the amplification of DNA. Because of the close analysis of chromosomes in cytogenetics, abnormalities are more readily seen and diagnosed.

==== Karyotyping ====
A karyotype is the number and appearance of chromosomes in the nucleus of a eukaryotic cell. The term is also used for the complete set of chromosomes in a species, or an individual organism.

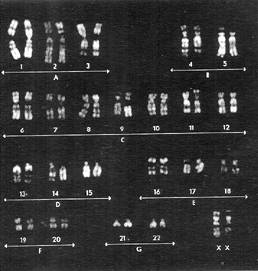
Karyotype of chromosomes

Karyotypes describe the number of chromosomes, and what they look like under a light microscope. Attention is paid to their length, the position of the centromeres, banding pattern, any differences between the sex chromosomes, and any other physical characteristics. Karyotyping uses a system of studying chromosomes to identify genetic abnormalities and evolutionary changes in the past.

=== DNA microarrays ===
A DNA microarray is a collection of microscopic DNA spots attached to a solid surface. Scientists use DNA microarrays to measure the expression levels of large numbers of genes simultaneously or to genotype multiple regions of a genome. When a gene is expressed in a cell, it generates messenger RNA (mRNA). Overexpressed genes generate more mRNA than underexpressed genes. This can be detected on the microarray. Since an array can contain tens of thousands of probes, a microarray experiment can accomplish many genetic tests in parallel. Therefore, arrays have dramatically accelerated many types of investigations.

=== PCR ===
The polymerase chain reaction (PCR) is a biochemical technology in molecular biology to amplify a single or a few copies of a piece of DNA across several orders of magnitude, generating thousands to millions of copies of a particular DNA sequence. PCR is now a common and often indispensable technique used in medical and biological research labs for a variety of applications. These include DNA cloning for sequencing, DNA-based phylogeny, or functional analysis of genes; the diagnosis of hereditary diseases; the identification of genetic fingerprints (used in forensic sciences and paternity testing); and the detection and diagnosis of infectious diseases.

== Applications ==
=== Cancer ===
Numerous practical advancements have been made in the field of genetics and molecular biology through the processes of genetic analysis. One of the most prevalent advancements during the late 20th and early 21st centuries is a greater understanding of cancer's link to genetics. By identifying which genes in the cancer cells are working abnormally, doctors can better diagnose and treat cancers.

=== Research ===
Research has been able to identify the concepts of genetic mutations, fusion genes and changes in DNA copy numbers, and advances are made in the field every day. Much of these applications have led to new types of sciences that use the foundations of genetic analysis. Reverse genetics uses the methods to determine what is missing in a genetic code or what can be added to change that code. Genetic linkage studies analyze the spatial arrangements of genes and chromosomes. There have also been studies to determine the legal and social and moral effects of the increase of genetic analysis. Genetic analysis may be done to identify genetic/inherited disorders and also to make a differential diagnosis in certain somatic diseases such as cancer. Genetic analyses of cancer include detection of mutations, fusion genes, and DNA copy number changes.
