= Josef Redtenbacher (entomologist) =

Austrian entomologist (1856–1926)

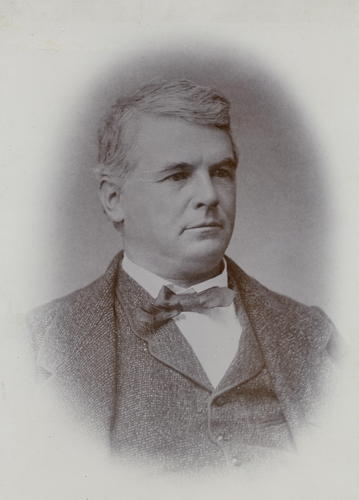
- Born: March 27, 1856; Kirchdorf an der Krems, Austrian Empire
- Died: July 18, 1926 (aged 70); Linz, Austria
- Citizenship: Austrian
- Education: University of Vienna
- Occupations: Entomologist, teacher
- Known for: Study of Orthoptera and Phasmatodea
- Relatives: Ludwig Redtenbacher (uncle), Simon Redtenbacher (brother)
- Scientific career
- Fields: Entomology

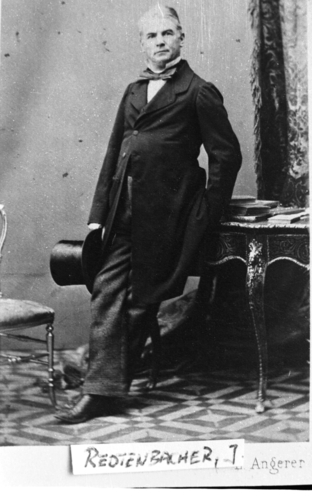

Josef Redtenbacher (27 March 1856 – 18 July 1926) was an Austrian entomologist and teacher. He specialized in the orders of Orthoptera (grasshoppers, locusts, and crickets), Phasmatodea (stick and leaf insects), Mantodea (mantis) and Blattodea (cockroaches), which are classically summarized as Orthoptera, as well as in the earwigs (Dermaptera), which are not assigned to the Orthoptera, especially from Austria-Hungary and Germany.

== Life ==
Redtenbacher was born on 27 March 1856 in Kirchdorf an der Krems. He was born the son of the scythe dealer Franz Xaver Redtenbacher (1804–1871) and Theresia Redtenbacher née Lampl (1823–1883) in the wealthy market town of Kirchdorf an der Krems in what was then the Austrian Empire. He was the brother of the scythe dealer Simon Redtenbacher, the nephew of the chemist Josef Redtenbacher and the entomologist Ludwig Redtenbacher. Redtenbacher studied natural sciences at the University of Vienna from 1874 to 1878. He passed his teaching examination in 1879 in the subjects of natural history, mathematics and natural sciences and from 1880 worked in the teaching profession in Vienna. From 1892 to 1896 he taught at the German Realschule in České Budějovice. From 1896 to 1915 Redtenbacher was a professor at the gymnasium in Vienna-Wieden. He spent the last decade of his life in Linz. He died in Linz on 18 July 1926, at the age of 70.

== Scientific activity ==
As early as 1886 he worked as a trainee at the Natural History Museum in Vienna. This activity resulted in a collaboration with the entomologists Ludwig Ganglbauer, Friedrich Moritz Brauer and especially with Carl Brunner von Wattenwyl. From 1889 he was a corresponding member of the Francisco Carolinum Museum, to which he gave most of his entomological collection in 1887. The Kremsmünster Monastery received the Upper Austrian grasshoppers. His achievements as an entomologist include, in particular, the creation of a "Monograph of the Conocephalinae" (German original: "Monographie der Conocephaliden"), the research of the Orthoptera and earwigs of Austria-Hungary and Germany, whose identification tables form the basis of all later work on the orders processed here Central and Southeastern Europe formed. He also wrote (Vol. 1 & 3) together with Brunner von Wattenwyl (Vol. 2) an edit and complete overview of the stick insects. Of the stick insect taxa described by Redtenbacher, 570 species, 78 genera and some higher taxa are valid to date (as of November 2022). In addition, he published some smaller studies on the larvae of Myrmeleontidae (antlions) and other works on grasshoppers, of which he described 223 species and 53 genera that are still valid today. In addition, together with Brauer and Ganglbauer, he established the fossil grasshopper genus Parapleurites and described their type species, as well as the fossil Humbertiella grandis (today Pseudohumbertiella grandis).

== Dedication names ==
The following grasshoppers were named after Josef Redtenbacher: Colossopus redtenbacheri (Brongniart, 1897), Conocephalus redtenbacheri (Bolívar, 1905), Isophya redtenbacheri Adelung, 1907, Neoconocephalus redtenbacheri (Karny, 1907), Phlugiola redtenbacheri Karny, 1907, Salomona redtenbacheri Brongniart, 1897 and Xiphidiopsis redtenbacheri Karny, 1924. The genus Redtenbacheriella Karny, 1910 named after him has been synonymized in 1964 with the older genus Pseudosaga Brancsik, 1897. In addition, Phoberodema redtenbacheri Brancsik, 1897 (today Phricta spinosa) and Tabaria redtenbacheri Bolívar, 1903 (today Rhammatopoda opilionoides) are synonyms named after Redtenbacher. Their valid names are species described by Redtenbacher.

Among the stick insects, the following species have been named after Redtenbacher: Ceroys redtenbacheri (Piza, 1936), Chlorobistus redtenbacheri Bragg, 2001, Phanocloidea redtenbacheri (Brock, 1998) and Phobaeticus redtenbacheri (Dohrn, 1910). In addition, the name of the subspecies Bacillus rossius redtenbacheri Padewieth, 1899 is dedicated to him.

== Publications ==
- Übersicht der Myrmeleoniden-Larven, Denkschriften Wien, mathematisch-naturwissenschaftliche Kl. 48, 1884
- Vergleichende Studien über das Flügelgeäder der Insecten, Annalen des kaiserlich-königlichen Naturhistorischen Hofmuseums 1, 1886
- Fossile Insekten aus der Juraformation Ost-Sibiriens, together Friedrich Moritz Brauer and Ludwig Ganglbauer, Mémoires de l’Acad. Impériale des Sciences de St.-Pétersbourg, Ser. 7, 36, 1889
- Monographie der Conocephaliden, Verhandlungen der kaiserlich-königlichen zoologischen-botanischen Gesellschaft in Wien 41, 1891
- Über Wanderheuschrecken, Programm der deutschen kaiserlich-königlichen Staats-Realschule in Budweis, 1893
- Die Dermatopteren und Orthopteren (Ohrwürmer und Geradflügler) von Österreich-Ungarn und Deutschland, 1900
- Die Insektenfamilie der Phasmiden. Vol. 1. Phasmidae Areolatae. Verlag Wilhelm Engelmann, Leipzig 1906
- Die Insektenfamilie der Phasmiden. Vol. 3. Phasmidae Anareolatae (Phibalosomini, Acrophyllini, Necrosciini). Verlag Wilhelm Engelmann, Leipzig 1908

== Literature ==
- Krackowizer, Anton Redtenbacher (1900). Die steirischen und oberösterreichischen Redtenbacher.; Botanik und Zool. in Österr. in den Jahren 1850–1900, 1901, pp. 10, 58, 289, 291, 298, 300, 311, 313, 316, 349, 503.
- Derksen, W. & Scheiding-Göllner, U. (1968). Index litteraturae entomologicae, Ser. 2, 3, p. 370.
- Zapfe, H. (1971). Index Palaeontologicorum Austriae (= Cat. Fossilium Austriae 15).
