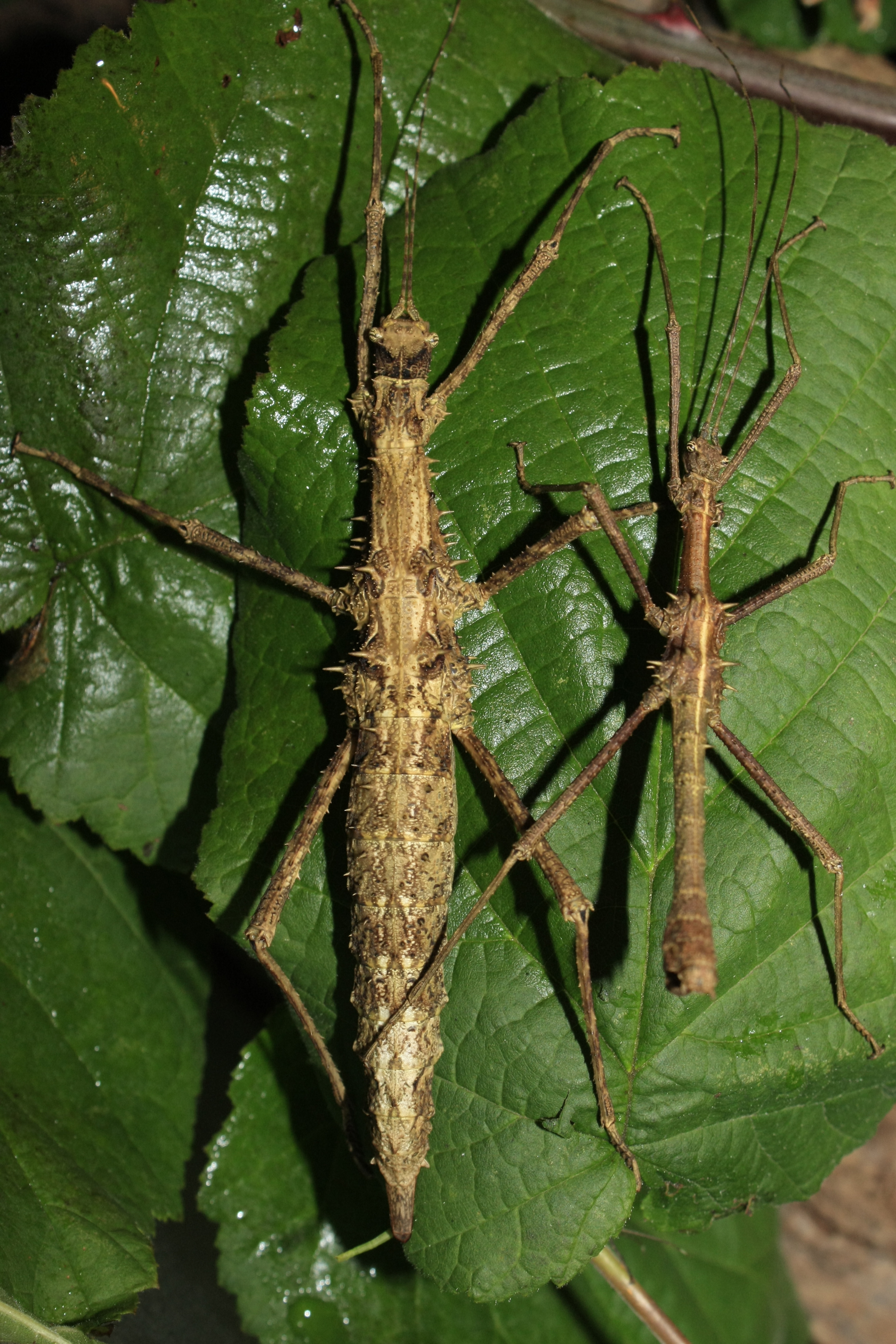
- Obrimus bicolanus, left female, right male

Scientific classification
- Kingdom: Animalia
- Phylum: Arthropoda
- Clade: Pancrustacea
- Class: Insecta
- Order: Phasmatodea
- Superfamily: Bacilloidea
- Family: Heteropterygidae
- Subfamily: Obriminae
- Tribe: Obrimini
- Genus: Obrimus; Stål, 1875

Type species
- Obrimus bufo (Westwood, 1848)

Species
- Obrimus bicolanus; Obrimus bufo; Obrimus mesoplatus; Obrimus quadratipes; Obrimus uichancoi

= Obrimus =

Genus of stick insects

Obrimus is a stick insect genus native to the Philippines. It is type genus for the tribe and the subfamily in which it is listed.

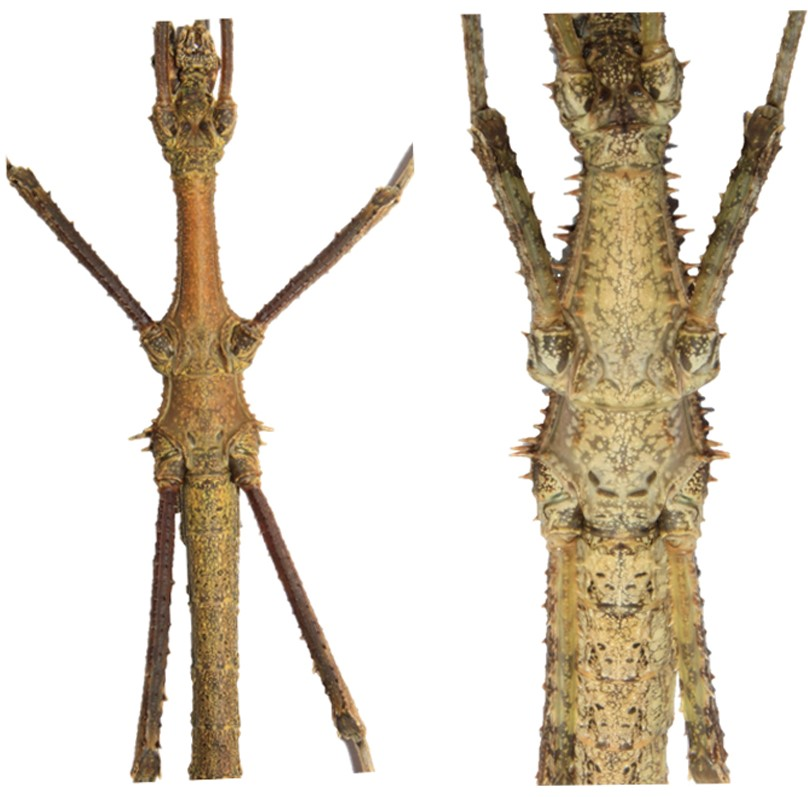
Obrimus bicolanus, left ♂, right ♀ view of slit-like impression near the lateral margins of the metasternum

== Characteristics ==
The species of this genus correspond in the habitus to the other representatives of the Obrimini, appear somewhat longer-legged compared to these and also have longer antennae than these. Like almost all other Obrimini, they are wingless in either sex. They are similar in size and appearance to the species of the genus Brasidas. As with these, the females have a relatively long and straight ovipositor. Obrimus species usually have more and sharper spines, but these are often thinner than those of most other Obrimini species. Like the representatives of the genus Brasidas, they have depressions in the metasternum, which here are merely formed as poorly or sometimes barely recognizable, flat slits on the outer edge of the metasternum, while in Brasidas they are holes or pits.

The shape of the eggs also differs significantly from that of other genera. The eggs are 4 to 5 millimetres (0.16 to 0.20 in) long and 3 to 4 millimetres (0.12 to 0.16 in) wide. The micropylar plate has three arms and is located on the dorsal area, which is bulging. The egg shape is reminiscent of that of Sungaya eggs. However, behind the tip at the lower pole there is another blunt pole, so that the eggs below, more or less clearly recognizable, have two blunt ends. The lid (operculum) sits diagonally on the egg and falls off sharply to the ventral side.

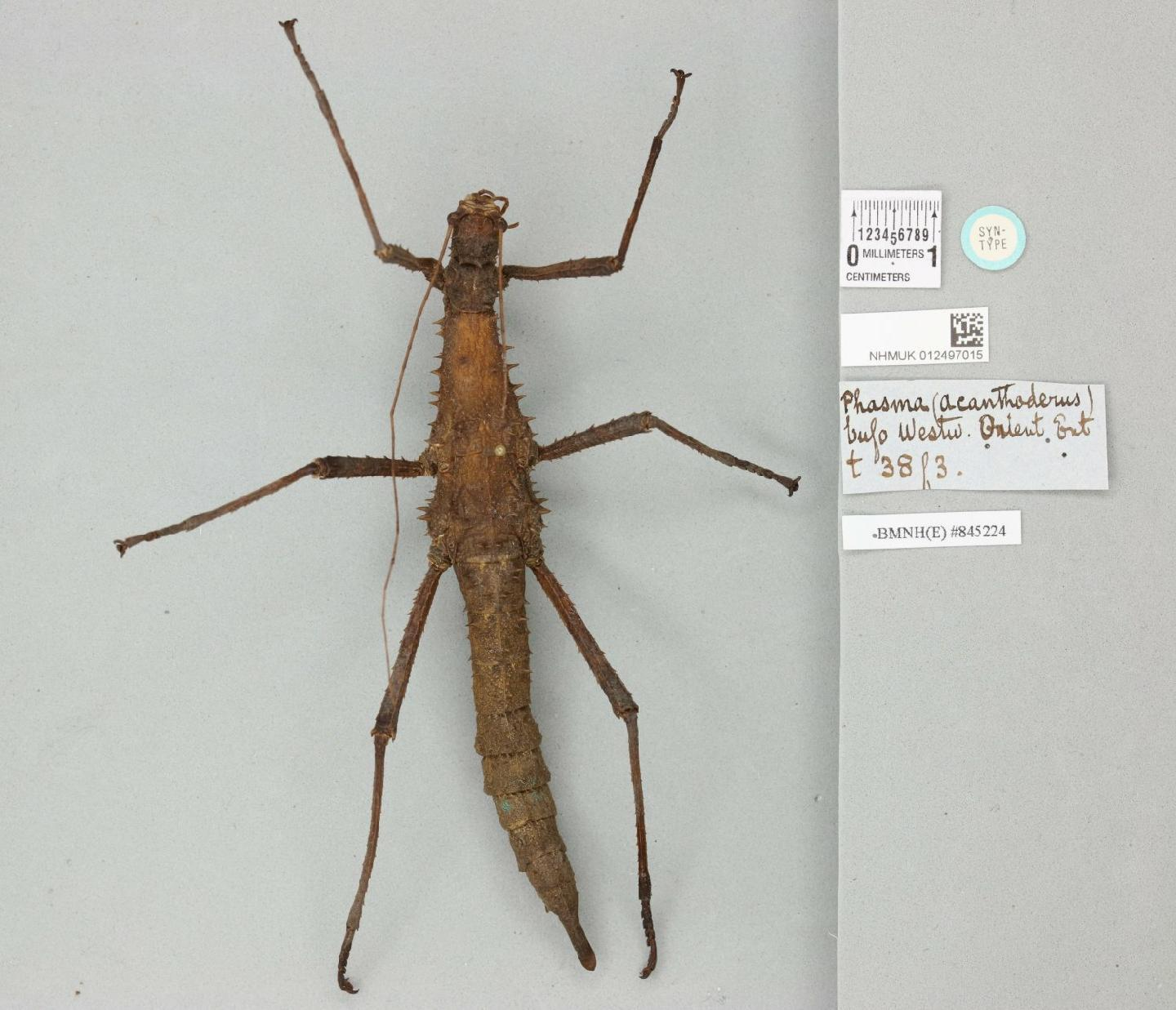
Obrimus bufo, female syntype from the BMNH

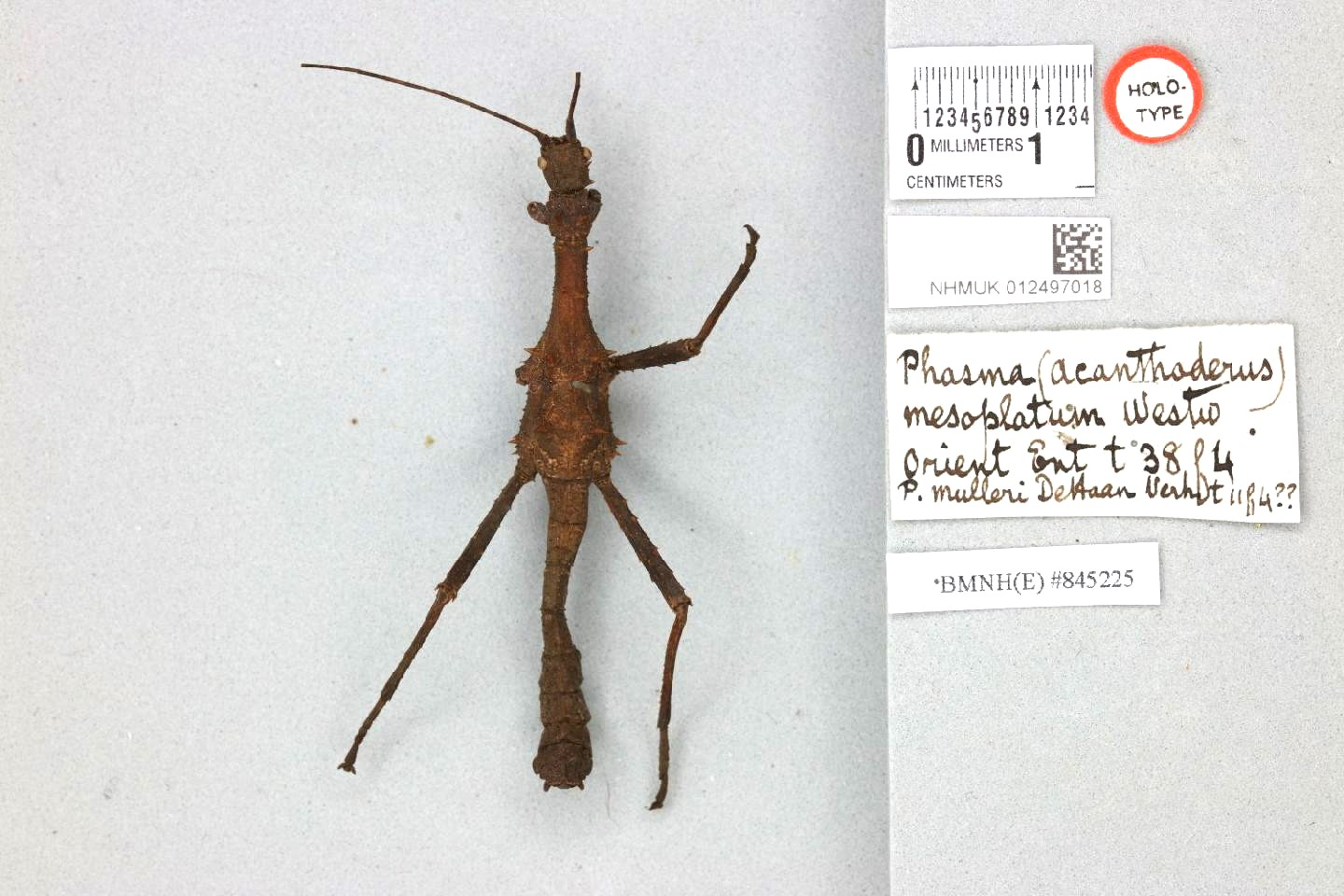
Obrimus mesoplatus, male holotype from the BMNH

== Taxonomy ==
The genus Obrimus was established in 1875 by Carl Stål. The generic name is borrowed from Greek mythology. As the only species, and thus type species, Stål named Obrimus bufo, which until then was listed in the genus Acanthoderus. Further species were described in this genus by Stål in 1877 and by Josef Redtenbacher in 1906. However, these were transferred in 1939 by James Abram Garfield Rehn and John William Holman Rehn into the genera Aretaon (Aretaon asperrimus and Aretaon muscosus both described in Obrimus in 1906), Trachyaretaon, which was described by Rehn and Rehn as a subgenus of Aretaon (Trachyaretaon echinatus described in Obrimus in 1877) and Brasidas (Brasidas cavernosus described in Obrimus in 1877, Brasidas foveolatus described in 1906 in Obrimus). Conversely, Frank H. Hennemann in 2023 transferred Obrimus quadratipes back to the genus Obrimus due to the slit-shaped depressions in the metasternum, in which it was described in 1890 by Ignacio Bolívar. Rehn and Rehn had transferred the species to the genus Brasidas in 1939 due to incorrectly identified material.

The following species are listed in the genus Obrimus:

- Obrimus bicolanus Rehn, J. A. G. & Rehn, J. W. H., 1939
- Obrimus bufo (Westwood, 1848)
- Obrimus mesoplatus (Westwood, 1848)
- Obrimus quadratipes Bolívar, 1890
- Obrimus uichancoi Rehn, J.A.G. & Rehn, J.W.H., 1939

In a study based on genetic analysis to clarify the phylogeny of the Heteropterygidae published by Sarah Bank et al. in 2021, samples from Obrimus bicolanus and Obrimus bufo were also sequenced. The study found that the genus Obrimus forms a common clade with the sister genus Brasidas.

== Distribution ==
Of the representatives known so far, only the occurrence of the two species described by Rehn and Rehn is known in more detail. Both appear on Luzon. While Obrimus bicolanus comes from the southeast of the island, more precisely from the Bicol region, Obrimus uichancoi was collected in the north in the province Apayao. Only the Philippines are given as location of the two other species.

== Terraristic ==
A single representative of the genus is currently in the terrariums of lovers. The stock goes back to specimens that Thierry Heitzmann collected in 2010 on Luzon and bred for the first time. Eggs of the species were brought to Europe by Hennemann, Joachim Bresseel and Bruno Kneubühler and successfully bred in 2011. Kneubühler initially passed on his animals as Obrimus sp. "Pulog", later as Obrimus bicolanus "Pulog". The Phasmid Study Group lists the species under the PSG number 324. Animals of this breeding line are no longer in breeding.
