= Obrimus quadratipes =

Scientific classification
- Kingdom: Animalia
- Phylum: Arthropoda
- Clade: Pancrustacea
- Class: Insecta
- Order: Phasmatodea
- Family: Heteropterygidae
- Subfamily: Obriminae
- Tribe: Obrimini
- Genus: Obrimus
- Species: O. quadratipes

Binomial name
- Obrimus quadratipes Bolívar, 1890

Synonyms
- Brasidas quadratipes (Bolívar, 1890)

Species of stick insect

Obrimus quadratipes is a stick insect species from the family of Heteropterygidae native to the Philippine island of Luzon.

== Description ==
Obrimus quadratipes is so far only known from two male specimens, namely the juvenile lectotype and an adult male in the collection of the National Museum of Natural History, France (MNHN) in Paris. In these specimens too, the slits in the slits in the metasternum (metasternal pseudoforamina) typical of the genus Obrimus are very narrow and barely recognizable. The juvenile lectotype is 42 millimetres (1.7 in) long, the adult male 64 millimetres (2.5 in) long. In contrast to all other males of the genus known to date, those of Obrimus quadratipes do not have any spines on the second to fourth tergum of the abdomen. There are eight spines on the head. A large pair of spines can be found on the posterior edge of the pronotum. On the anterior edge of the mesonotum is a smaller pair of spines, in its middle is a barely noticeable or missing pair, and on its posterior edge there is another pair of spines just as large as the one on the pronotum. The pair of spines on the posterior edge of the metanotum is just as large. The metapleurae are very spiny. In contrast to Obrimus mesoplatus, Obrimus quadratipes lacks both the prominent, central pair of spines on the mesonotum, as well as the spines on the anterior and the triangular lobes on the posterior abdominal segments.

== Occurrence ==
In the first description, only the Philippines, Mazareddo, is mentioned as the type locality, with Mazareddo presumably being the collector of the described specimen. Since the genus is so far only known from Luzon, more recent works assume that Obrimus quadratipes is also endemic there.

== Taxonomy ==
Ignacio Bolívar described the species in 1890 as Obrimus quadratipes on a juvenile male that had meanwhile been deposited as a lectotype in the Museo Nacional de Ciencias Naturales in Madrid. This made the species, along with Obrimus bufo, the only representative of the genus Obrimus established by Carl Stål in 1875. Obrimus mesoplatus, which had already been described in 1848 as Phasma (Acanthoderus) mesoplatus, was still listed in the genus Dares at that time.

In 1906, Josef Redtenbacher supplemented Bolívar's description by adding features of a second specimen to the description, namely a 64 millimetres (2.5 in) long male, which is obviously the male deposited in the National Museum of Natural History in Paris.

James Abram Garfield Rehn and his son John William Holman Rehn transferred Obrimus quadratipes to the genus Brasidas in 1939. Frank H. Hennemann transferred the species back to the genus Obrimus in 2023 due to the slit-shaped depressions in the metasternum, since its transfer to the genus Brasidas by Rehn and Rehn was based on incorrectly identified material.
