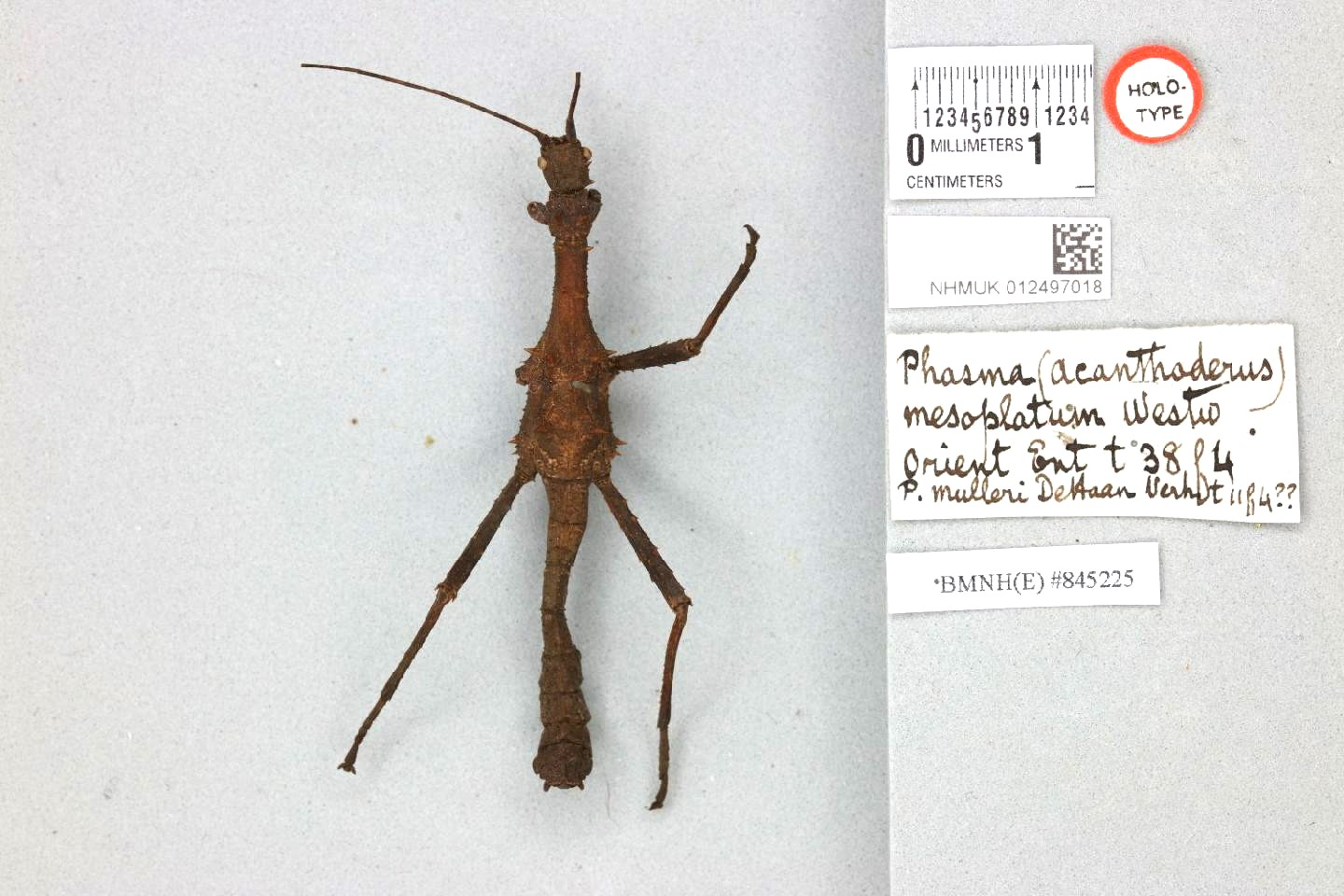
- Obrimus mesoplatus, male holotype from the NHM

Scientific classification
- Kingdom: Animalia
- Phylum: Arthropoda
- Clade: Pancrustacea
- Class: Insecta
- Order: Phasmatodea
- Family: Heteropterygidae
- Subfamily: Obriminae
- Tribe: Obrimini
- Genus: Obrimus
- Species: O. mesoplatus

Binomial name
- Obrimus mesoplatus (Westwood, 1848)

Synonyms
- Phasma (Acanthoderus) mesoplatum Westwood, 1848; Acanthoderus mesoplatus (Westwood, 1848); Dares mesoplatus (Westwood, 1848)

= Obrimus mesoplatus =

Species of stick insect

Obrimus mesoplatus is a stick insect species from the family of the Heteropterygidae native to the Philippine island of Luzon.

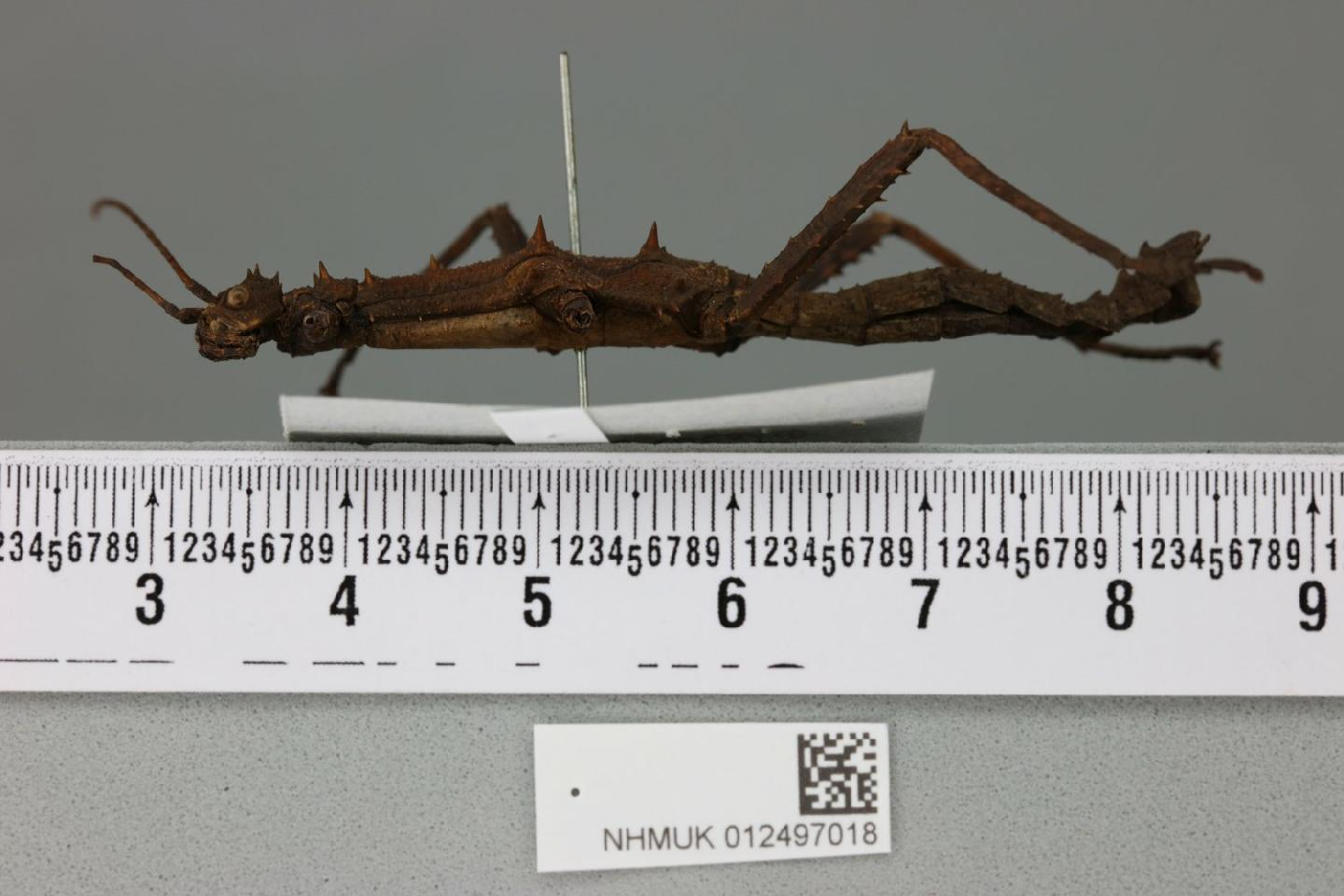
Male holotypus from the NHM

== Description ==
Obrimus mesoplatus is so far only known from a single specimen, namely the male holotype. In this case too, the slits in the metasternum (metasternal pseudoforamina) typical of the genus Obrimus are very narrow and barely recognizable. The male is a good 5.3 centimetres (2.1 in) long. This makes Obrimus mesoplatus the smallest species of the genus. The male has three pairs of spines on its head. There is a larger pair of spines on the pronotum. One pair of spines on the frontal edge and one in the middle of the mesonotum are hardly smaller. The front and rear edges of the metanotum also have a similarly large pair of spines. There are small pairs of spines on the second to fourth tergum of the abdomen. Triangular elevations (lobes) are located in the middle of the sixth to ninth abdominal tergum. Obrimus quadratipes lacks both the middle pair of spines on the mesonotum and the spines on the front and the triangular lobes on the rear abdominal segments.

== Occurrence ==
In the first description, only the Philippine Islands are mentioned as the location. Since the genus is so far only known from Luzon, more recent works assume that Obrimus mesoplatus is also endemic there.

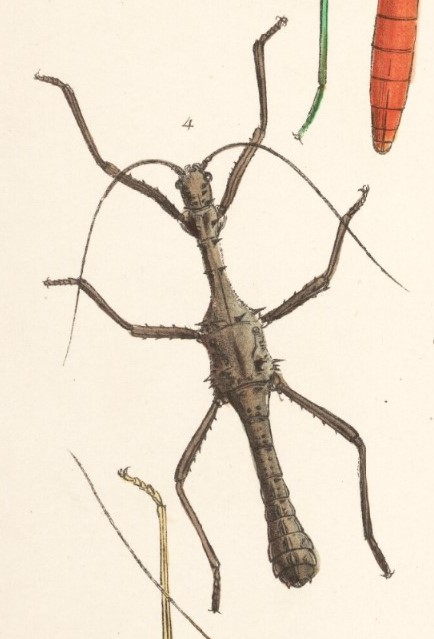
Drawing from the original description by Westwood 1848

== Taxonomy ==
John Obadiah Westwood described the species in 1848 as Phasma (Acanthoderus) mesoplatus. The chosen species name "mesoplatus" is not explained. Westwood depicts a male and describes it. In 1859, like many others, he transferred the species to the former subgenus Acanthoderus, which is now listed as a genus, and here again describes the male, which is kept as the holotype at the Natural History Museum in London.

Carl Stål transferred the species in 1875, along with two other Westwood species from the genus Acanthoderus, to the genus Dares, which had been established for Dares validispinus. Of the other two species, Dares ulula has remained in this genus, while Dares otys is now listed as Pylaemenes otys. Ignacio Bolívar mentioned in 1890 when describing Obrimus quadratipes its similarity to Acanthoderus mesoplatus and pointed out that he also saw this more in Obrimus and not in Dares like Stål. William Forsell Kirby finally transferred Acanthoderus mesoplatus in 1904 as the third representative alongside Obrimus bufo and Obrimus quadratipes in the genus Obrimus described by Stål in 1875.

Josef Redtenbacher also worked on the species in 1906. He assigned it as a synonym of Obrimus bufo and obviously used its holotype to describe the morphology and size of the males of Obrimus bufo. This synonymization was withdrawn in 1939 by James Abram Garfield Rehn and his son John William Holman Rehn and the species was transferred back to the genus Obrimus as Obrimus mesoplatus.
