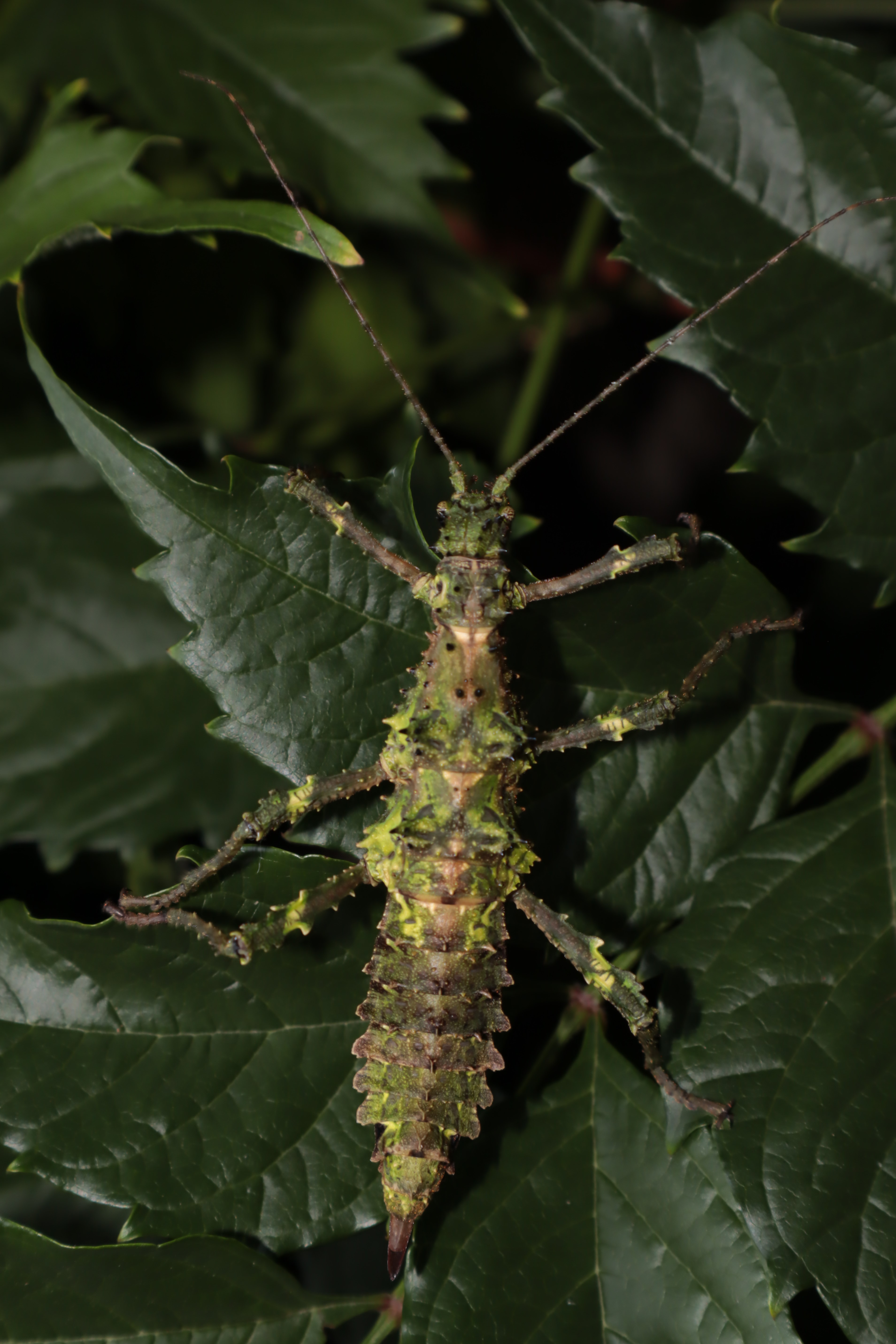
- Aretaon muscosus, female

Scientific classification
- Kingdom: Animalia
- Phylum: Arthropoda
- Clade: Pancrustacea
- Class: Insecta
- Order: Phasmatodea
- Family: Heteropterygidae
- Subfamily: Obriminae
- Tribe: Obrimini
- Genus: Aretaon
- Species: A. muscosus

Binomial name
- Aretaon muscosus (Redtenbacher, 1906)

Synonyms
- Obrimus muscosus Redtenbacher, 1906

= Aretaon muscosus =

Species of stick insect

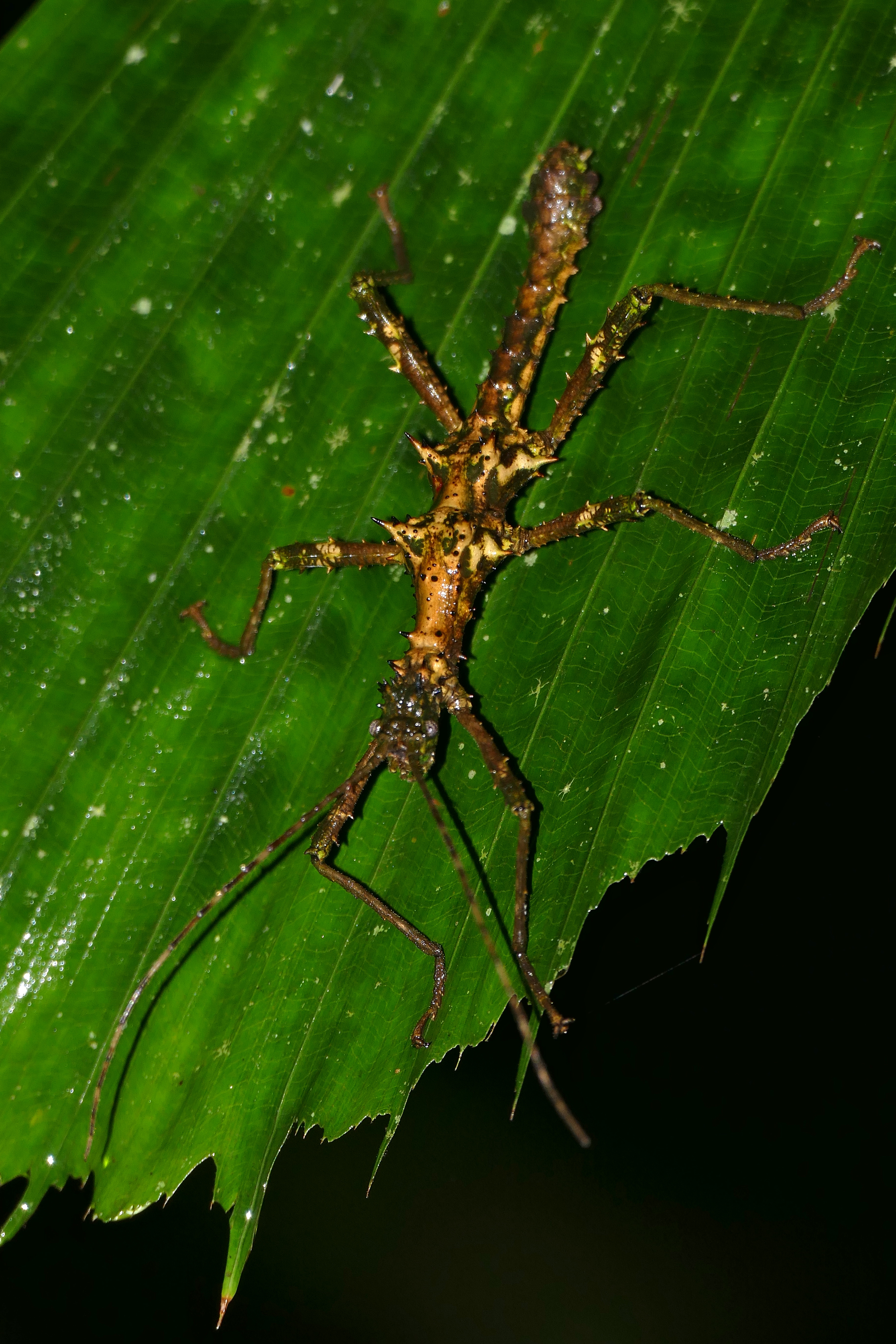
Male

Aretaon muscosus is a stick insect species from the family Heteropterygidae, which is native to Borneo.

== Characteristics ==
While in the sister species Aretaon asperrimus only occasionally nymph with a clear green component appear in the coloration, the nymphs of Aretaon muscosus are always colored green. The adult females are also intensely green in color. At 72 to 74 millimetres (2.8 to 2.9 in), they remain somewhat smaller than those of Aretaon asperrimus. Their most noticeable feature are the lobes or leaf-like extensions on the edges of the abdomen. They exist from the first through the eighth segments, with the largest being on segments three through seven. The dorsal edges of the tibiae are equipped with easily recognizable spines. Their color and body structure make them look like they are overgrown with moss. The rather golden yellow and brown patterned males reach a size of 49 to 50 millimetres (1.9 to 2.0 in). They too have lobes on the edges of the abdomen, which can be found here on segments three to nine. Like the abdominal segments themselves, they also gradually increase in size towards the end of the abdomen.

== Taxonomy ==
Josef Redtenbacher described the species in 1906 as Obrimus muscosus. James Abram Garfield Rehn and his son John William Holman Rehn transferred them in 1939 together with Obrimus asperrimus also described by Redtenbacher to the genus Aretaon, which was specially established for these two species. As syntypes are diverse, 47 to 64 millimetres (1.9 to 2.5 in) long, male and female specimens deposited. Two female and one male syntypes are in the Natural History Museum Vienna and three nymph syntypes in the Zoological Museum of the Russian Academy of Sciences in St. Petersburg. As early as 1935 Klaus Günther considered that Aretaon muscosus could be more spiny representatives of Aretaon asperrimus. However, because of the pronounced spines of the smaller specimens, he considered this to be unlikely. Also Philip Edward Bragg, who had already made the experience that the spines in adult Aretaon asperrimus are significantly reduced, mentioned this possibility in 2001, holding a synonymization but for too hasty. In 2004 Oliver Zompro also mentioned that Aretaeon muscosus is very likely a synonym of Aretaon asperrimus. Daniel Otte and Paul D. Brock finally used Aretaon muscosus as a synonym in 2005. Francis Seow-Choen revalidated the species in 2016 because its syntypes match perfectly with the specimens he found from the Gunung Mulu National Park.

== Distribution area ==
Aretaeon muscosus occurs in the Malay part of Borneo, more precisely in the northwestern state of Sarawak. There the species was found in the Gunung Mulu National Park. For most syntypes, Kinabalu in Sabah is given as the place where it was found. As with Aretaon asperrimus, Rehn and Rehn state that they also examined specimens from the island Labuan from the collection of Morgan Hebard in Aretaon muscosus.

== Terraristic ==
In July 2014 Albert Kang collected specimens in the Gunung Mulu National Park, which Thierry Heitzmann was able to bring to the Philippines. The resulting parthenogenetic stock can now also be found in the terrariums of European breeders and was initially called Aretaon sp. 'Mulu'. After the revalidation of Aretaon muscosus and the publication of the first pictures of adult specimens by Seow-Choen in 2016, it became clear that the breeding stock is identical to this species both in appearance and in terms of where it was found. Since then he has been referred to as Aretaon muscosus 'Mulu'. Various ferns, as well as bramble, hazel and mango are accepted as fodder plants.
