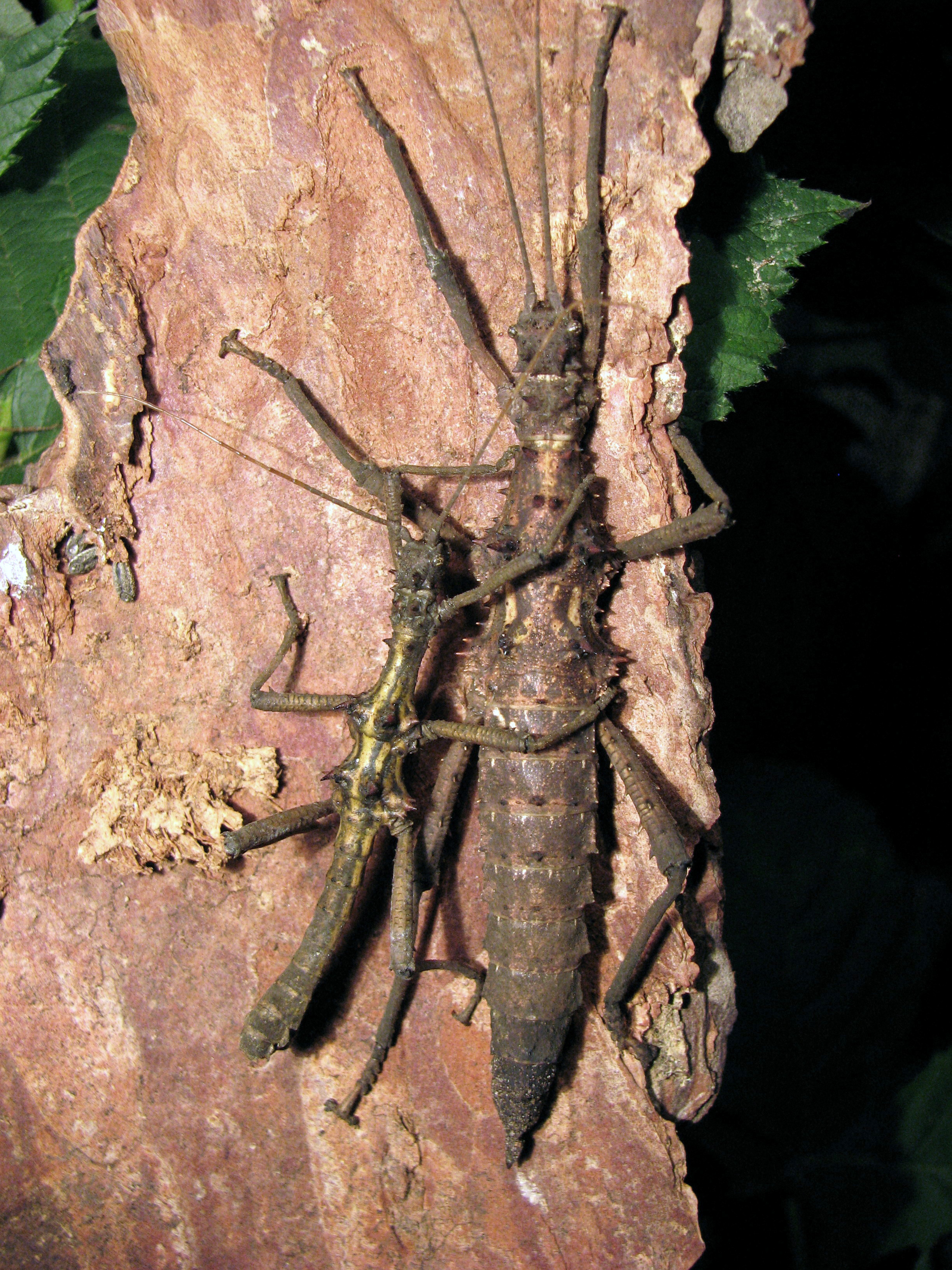
- Aretaon asperrimus, pair

Scientific classification
- Kingdom: Animalia
- Phylum: Arthropoda
- Class: Insecta
- Order: Phasmatodea
- Superfamily: Bacilloidea
- Family: Heteropterygidae
- Subfamily: Obriminae
- Tribe: Obrimini
- Genus: Aretaon; Rehn, J.A.G. & Rehn, J.W.H., 1939

Type species
- Aretaon asperrimus (Redtenbacher, 1906)

Species
- Aretaon asperrimus; Aretaon muscosus

= Aretaon (insect) =

Genus of stick insects

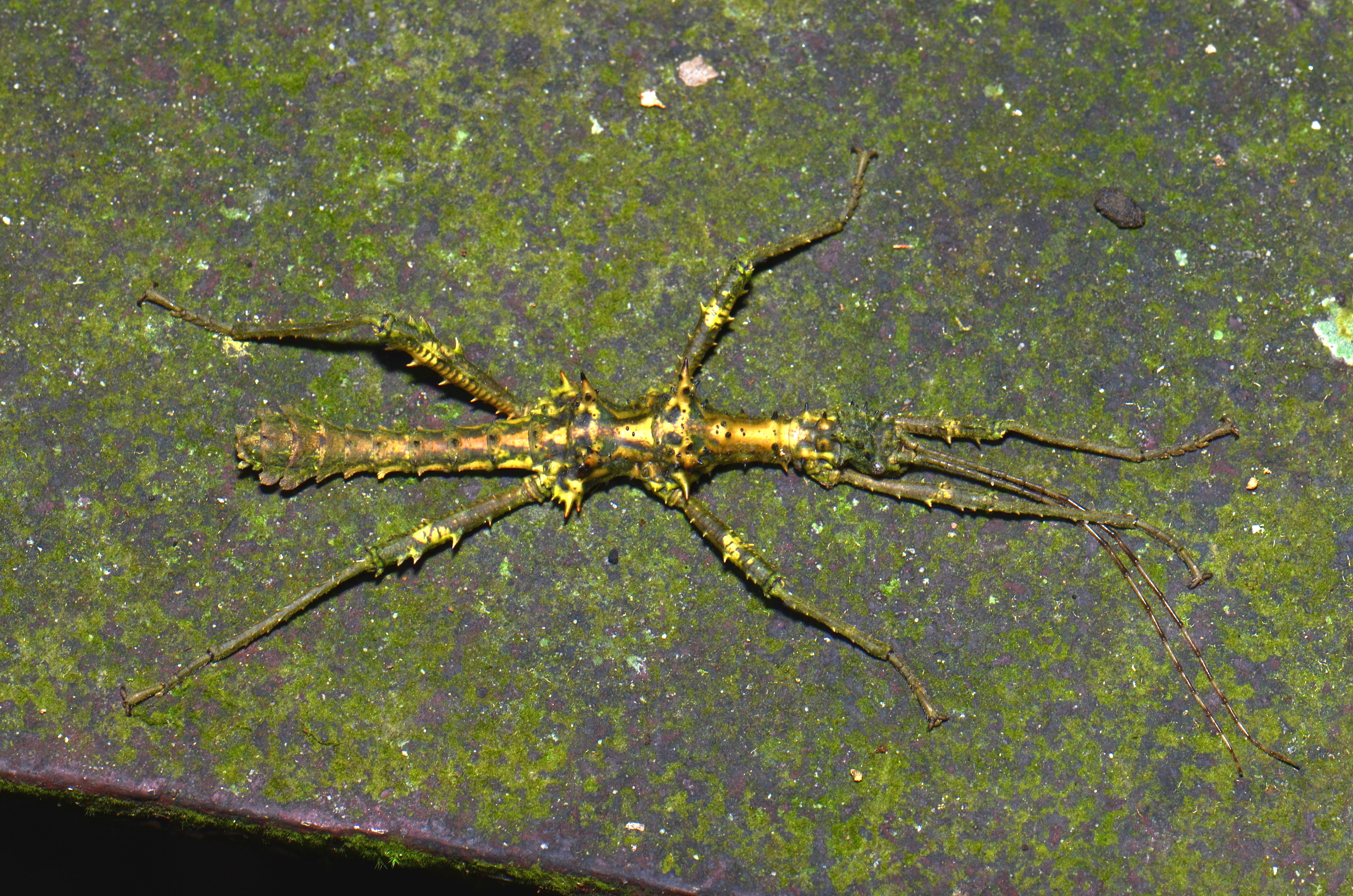
Male of Aretaon muscosus from Mulu

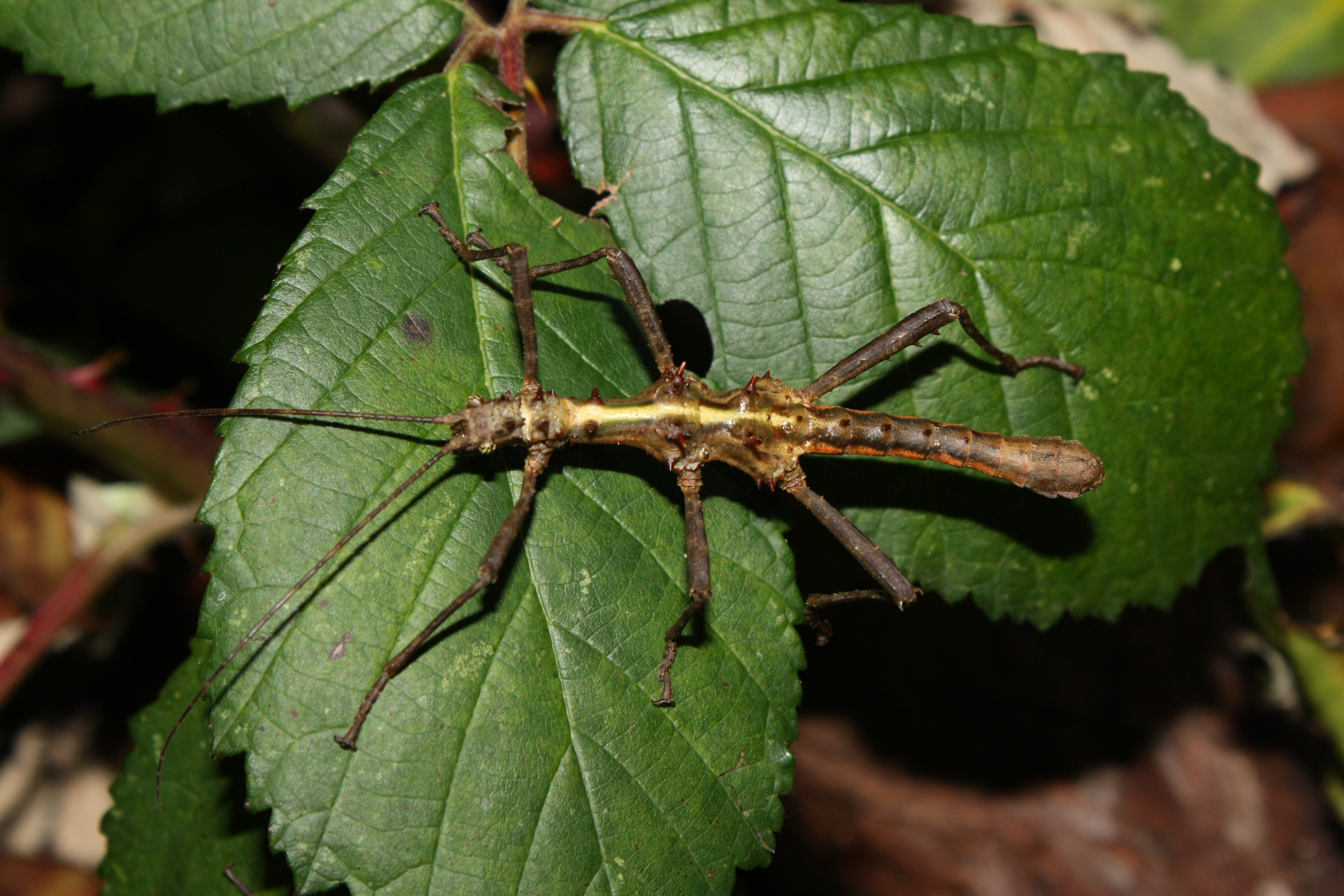
Male of Aretaon asperrimus from Palawan

Aretaon is a genus of stick insects native to Borneo and the Philippine island Palawan.

== Characteristics ==
The species of the genus Aretaon correspond in the habitus typical representatives of the Obrimini and are very similar in appearance to those of the genera Trachyaretaon and Sungaya. Like these, they are wingless in either sex. With a length of approx. 4.7 to 5.4 centimetres (1.9 to 2.1 in), the males remain smaller than the females which reach length from 7.2 to 8.8 centimetres (2.8 to 3.5 in). In egg-laying adult females, the abdomen in the middle is clearly thickened in height and width and thus almost circular in cross-section. As with the other genera of the Obriminae, an ovipositor at the end of the abdomen surrounds the actual ovipositor. It is ventral formed from the eighth sternite, which is called the subgenital plate or operculum and dorsally from the eleventh tergum, which here is called the supraanal plate or epiproct. Unlike Trachyaretaon species, they have a pair of distinct spines in the front area of the mesonotum. In the metasternum there are no holes or pits or noticeable slits, which are common for representatives of the genera Brasidas, Euobrimus and Obrimus are typical.

== Distribution ==
The representatives of the genus described so far are native to the Malay part of Borneo. Aretaon asperrimus can be found in the north of the island, in the state of Sabah. In addition, this species is said to be found also on Labuan and on the Philippine island Luzon, more precisely in Benguet. Aretaon muscosus is in the further northwest located state Sarawak, more precisely in the Gunung Mulu National Park, but is also said to occur in Sabah. On the Philippine island Palawan there are further specimens of Aretaon asperrimus, which differ in color from those native to Borneo. Her status was not initially clarified. Their affiliation to Aretaon asperrimus could be proven by genetic analysis published in 2021.

== Taxonomy ==
James Abram Garfield Rehn and his son John William Holman Rehn established the genus Aretaon in 1939 for two by Josef Redtenbacher as Obrimus asperrimus and Obrimus muscosus described species. Type species of the genus is Aretaon asperrimus. The name "Aretaon" is derived from Greek mythology borrowed and denotes, among other things, a defender Troy. Since the description of Aretaon muscosus was only based on a few very spine and very rich in lobes, 4.7 to 6.4 centimetres (1.9 to 2.5 in) long nymphs, their species status was long controversial. As early as 1935 Klaus Günther considered that these animals could be nymphs of Aretaon asperrimus. However, because of the pronounced spines and lobes of the smaller specimens, he considered this to be unlikely. Also Philip Edward Bragg, who had already made the experience that the spines and lobes adult of the Aretaon asperrimus is significantly reduced, mentioned this possibility in 2001, holding a synonymization but for too hasty. In 2004 Oliver Zompro also mentioned that Aretaeon muscosus is very likely a synonym for Aretaon asperrimus. Daniel Otte and Paul D. Brock finally used Aretaeon muscosus as a synonym in 2005. As a result Aretaon became a monotypic genus. Francis Seow-Choen revalidated the species in 2016 because its types match perfectly with the specimens he found from the Gunung Mulu National Park.

== Terraristic ==
As early as 1992 and 1996, Aretaon asperrimus was introduced for terraristics. Both stocks were collected at Kinabalu. The Phasmid Study Group gave this the PSG number 118. Another, color-distinguishable, sexual strain goes into fertilized female, which Joachim Bresseel collected in 2010 on Mount Gantung on Palawan. It was initially called Aretaon sp. 'Palawan' and received the PSG number 329. Since its identification in 2021 it has been referred to as Aretaon asperrimus 'Palawan'.

In July 2014 Albert Kang collected another species in the Gunung Mulu National Park, which Thierry Heitzmann was able to breed successfully in 2015. The resulting stock is parthenogenetic and is called Aretaon sp. 'Mulu'. The species corresponds both in its appearance and in its locality to the specimens identified by Francis Seow-Choen as Aretaeon muscosus.
