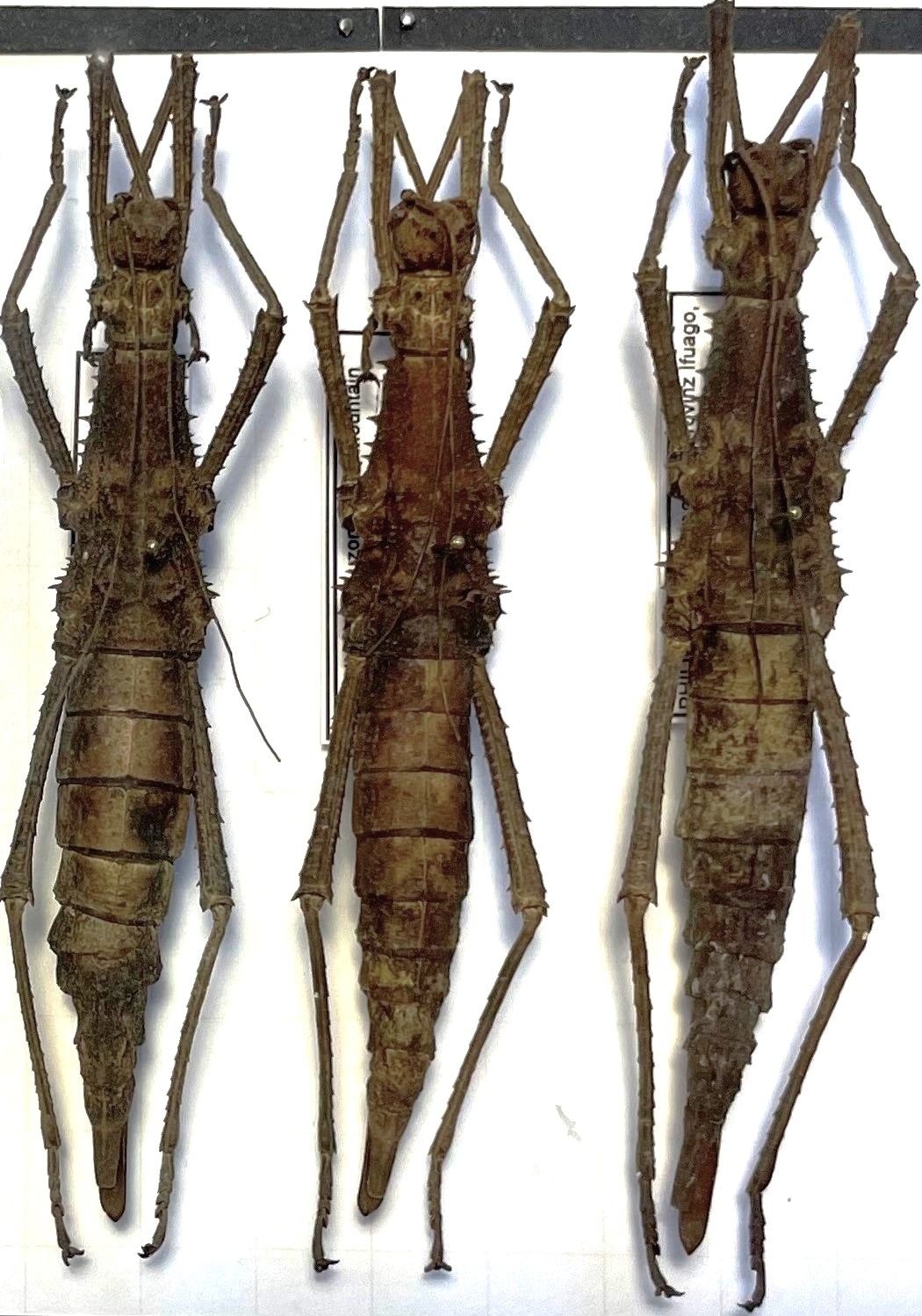
- Obrimus uichancoi, three females from the collection of Frank H. Hennemann

Scientific classification
- Kingdom: Animalia
- Phylum: Arthropoda
- Clade: Pancrustacea
- Class: Insecta
- Order: Phasmatodea
- Family: Heteropterygidae
- Subfamily: Obriminae
- Tribe: Obrimini
- Genus: Obrimus
- Species: O. uichancoi

Binomial name
- Obrimus uichancoi Rehn, J. A. G. & Rehn, J.W.H., 1939

= Obrimus uichancoi =

Species of stick insect

Obrimus uichancoi is a stick insect species from the family of the Heteropterygidae native to the north of the Philippine island of Luzon.

== Description ==
Males of Obrimus uichancoi have not been described. In this species, too, the slits in the metasternum typical of the genus are very narrow and barely recognizable. Compared to the two other species of Obrimus for which females are known, Obrimus bicolanus and Obrimus bufo, this species is less spiny and on average somewhat smaller. The central spines on terga I to VI of the abdomen are either completely missing or are only recognizable as paired, small tubercles. The medial spines on the mesonotum (median mesonotals) are either completely missing or very indistinct, as in the females collected in Bay-Yo in the Mountain Province. The females reach lengths of 8.5 to 10.0 centimetres (3.3 to 3.9 in), although the specimens from the Ifugao province examined are somewhat larger on average. The coloration of the specimen in life is known only from one female from Banaue in the Ifugao province. This specimen has a pure green base color with little brown and light patterning.

== Occurrence and reproduction ==
The distribution area of the species extends across the north of the island of Luzon. The type locality is Ripang in the province of Apayao. The geographic coordinates are given as 17°48’N 121°90’E. Other localities are in Bay-Yo on the border of the Mountain Province and the province of Nueva Vizcaya, where it has been found in both provinces, as well as in the province of Ifugao, in the Cordillera Central mountain range, and in Banaue. The specimens have been found at altitudes between 450 and 1,300 metres (1,480 and 4,270 ft). Another locality is in Los Banos in the province of Laguna. A very young male, identified by the first describers of this species, comes from southern Luzon, more precisely from Barangay Binay in the municipality of San Narciso in the province of Quezon., Since only female animals have been found apart from this male, it is assumed that the species reproduces purely parthenogenetically, at least locally.

== Taxonomy ==
James Abram Garfield Rehn and his son John William Holman Rehn described Obrimus uichancoi in 1939, alongside Obrimus bicolanus, as one of two new Obrimus species. The chosen species name "uichancoi" was chosen in honor of Professor Leopoldo B. Uichanco (* 1894; † 1972), the first Philippine field entomologist. He had lent Rehn and Rehn material for their 1938/39 work.

Rehn and Rehn described the species from a juvenile, 6.2 centimetres (2.4 in) long female from the collection of Morgan Hebard, which was collected by W. Boettcher in Ripang in February 1918. It is deposited as the holotype at the Academy of Natural Sciences in Philadelphia. In addition to this female, Rehn and Rehn examined five other females in various larval stages from Herbard's collection, also collected by Boettcher in Ripang in February 1918, as well as a juvenile female from the collection of the University of the Philippines Los Baños College of Agriculture and Food Science, which was collected by C.S. Banks on November 20, 1915 in Los Baños. In addition, a male nymph from Herbard's collection was examined. This was collected by Boettcher on March 17, 1916, in Binay (information from Rehn and Rehn, or Herbard) or Vinai (information on Boettcher's original label). Its locality, located in Quezon Province, formerly known as Tayabas, with coordinates 13°30'N 122°35'E, is located significantly further south in Luzon. Since this specimen was still in a very early larval stage, its description was omitted. With the exception of the female holotype, all other specimens examined were not mentioned in subsequent studies on this species. Only their localities were given.

For the scientific study of the Philippine Obrimini, Frank H. Hennemann examined a total of twelve adult females of the species collected between 2010 and 2013. These included one specimen found by Thierry Heitzmann in Banaue and two collected by Albert Kang in Bay-Yo in July 2012. All three are deposited at the Museum of Natural Sciences in Brussels. The remaining nine females come from local collectors and are in Hennemann's specimen collection.

== In terraristics ==
On December 11, 2013, Heitzmann and Kang found several females of this species in the Mountain Province in Bay-Yo at an altitude of 1,050 to 1,350 metres (3,440 to 4,430 ft). Heitzmann found two additional female nymphs in Mayoyao in the Cordillera Central Mountain range. He raised these and brought some females to lay eggs. He offered the eggs to European breeders. No breeding stock could be established from the eggs he sent.
