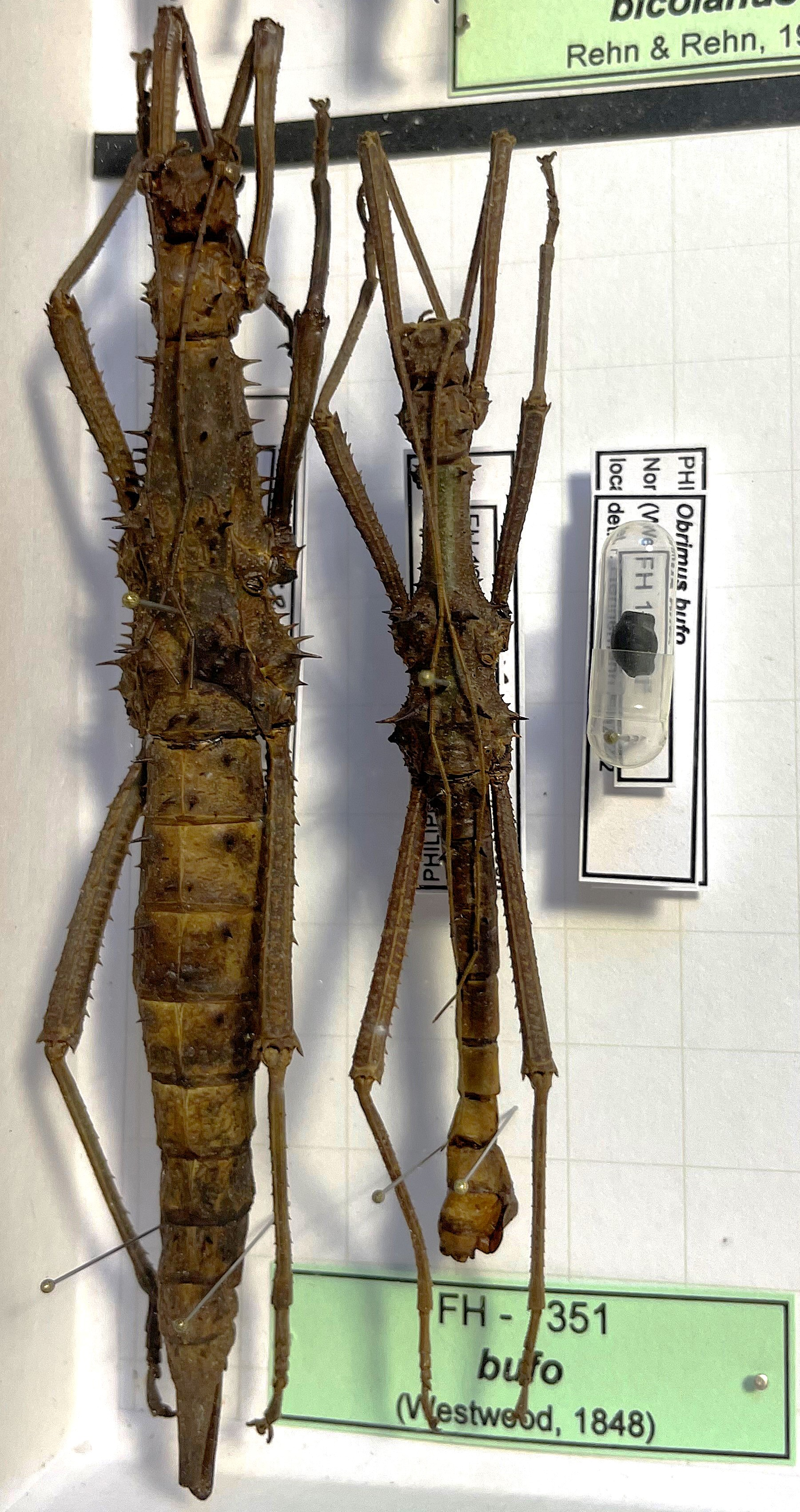
- Obrimus bufo, pair from the collection of Frank H. Hennemann

Scientific classification
- Kingdom: Animalia
- Phylum: Arthropoda
- Clade: Pancrustacea
- Class: Insecta
- Order: Phasmatodea
- Family: Heteropterygidae
- Subfamily: Obriminae
- Tribe: Obrimini
- Genus: Obrimus
- Species: O. bufo

Binomial name
- Obrimus bufo (Westwood, 1848)

Synonyms
- Phasma (Acanthoderus) bufo Westwood, 1848; Acanthoderus bufo (Westwood, 1848)

= Obrimus bufo =

Species of stick insect

Obrimus bufo is a stick insect species from the family of the Heteropterygidae native to the Philippine island of Luzon.

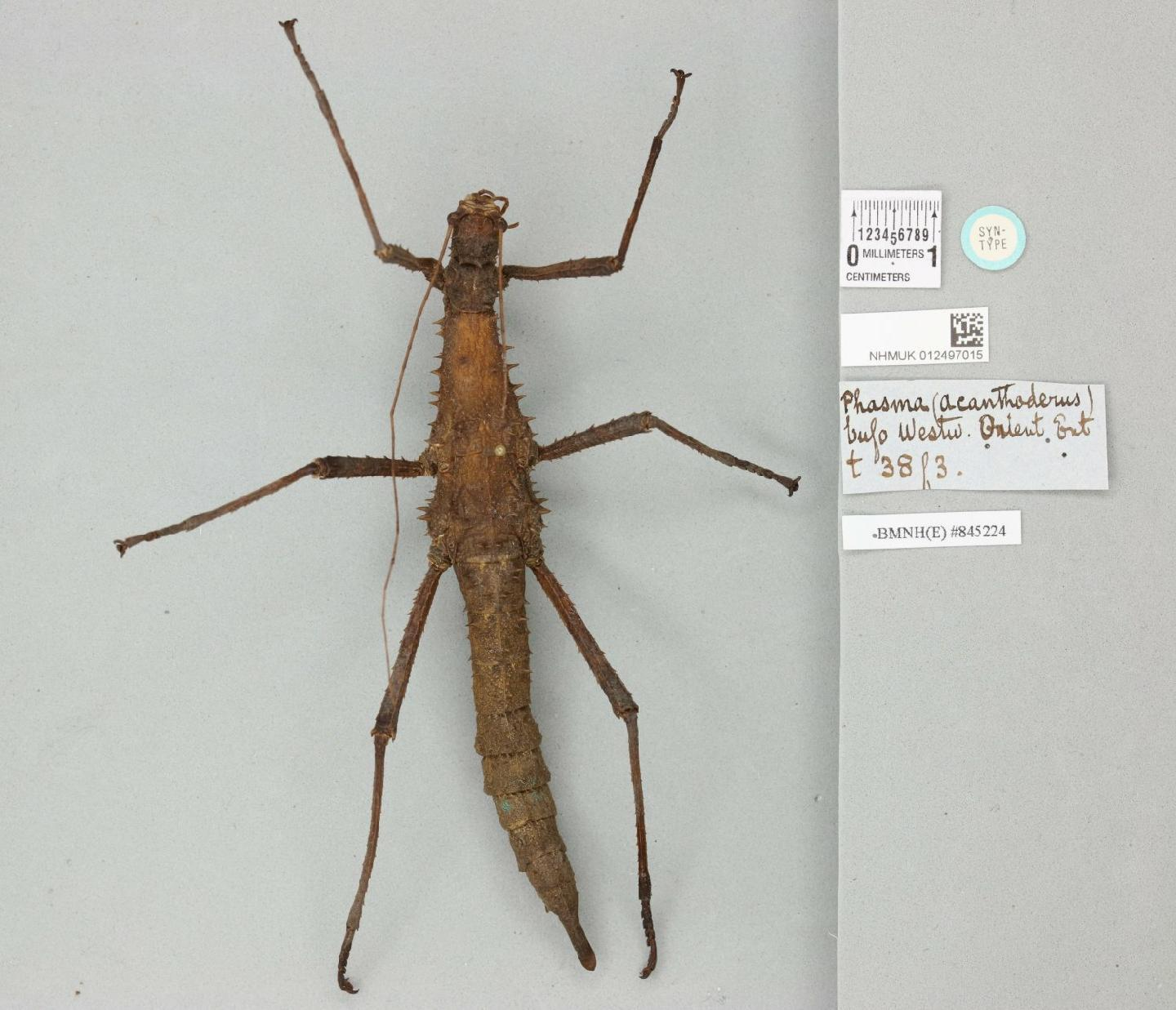
Female syntype from the NHM

== Description ==
Obrimus bufo is the largest species of the genus. In this species, too, the slits in the metasternum that are typical of the genus are very narrow and barely recognizable. The females known to date reach lengths of between 10.6 to 10.9 centimetres (4.2 to 4.3 in). The coloration when alive is unknown. The coloration of the collection specimens varies between iron-, medium- and ochre-brown, with the ochre-brown specimen showing an olive-green shimmer. The body spines of the females are similar to those of the smaller and stockier Obrimus bicolanus. From these, Obrimus bufo females are distinguished by the presence of a pair of small but distinct anterior spines on the pronotum (anterior pronotals), the absence of a second, posterior pair of spines on the abdominal terga II to IV, as well as by a differently shaped preopercular organ, which has a transverse and slightly double-humped swelling on the posterior edge of the sternum VII of the abdomen.

The males reach a length of about 6.85 to 7.3 centimetres (2.70 to 2.87 in). They are as slender and spiny as those of Obrimus bicolanus, but differ from these in that their anal segment which is broadened transversely and more rectangular. Its posterior margin is broader, slightly bilobed and has a shallow pit near each posterior-lateral angle. The anal segment of the males of Obrimus bicolanus is, on the other hand, almost hexagonal.

The only known egg is 5.3 millimetres (0.21 in) long, 3.0 millimetres (0.12 in) wide and 3.8 millimetres (0.15 in) high, bulbous and of a typical shape for the genus. The capsule is slightly domed and shows the transverse indentation typical of Obrimus at the lower pole, which makes the eggs there appear double-humped. The dorsal surface is more convex than the ventral. The micropylar plate is 3.9 millimetres (0.15 in) long and wide, three-armed, inverted T-shaped. It is noticeably inflated and clearly raised above the capsule surface. The lid (operculum) is round, flat and sits on the capsule with an opercular angle of about 15°, which slopes slightly towards the ventral side. In Obrimus bicolanus this is larger and amounts to 25°.

== Occurrence ==
In the first description, only the Philippine islands are mentioned as locality of the described material. Later, the place of discovery is given as Manila and thus the island of Luzon. The more recent finds that can be definitely assigned to this species come from the province of Ilocos Norte or, somewhat less precisely, from the Ilocos Region and thus from the northwest of Luzon.

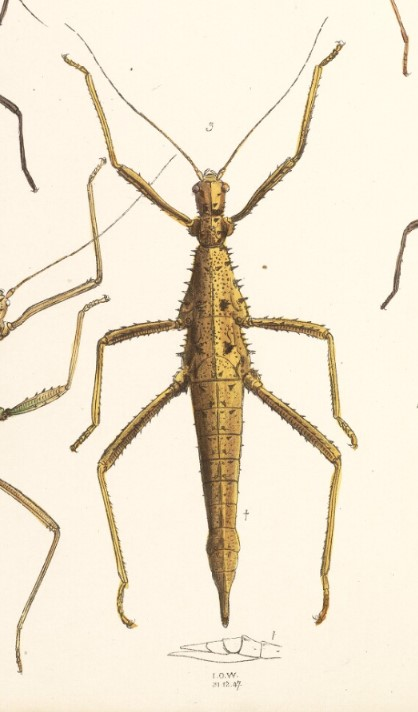
Drawing from the original description by Westwood 1848

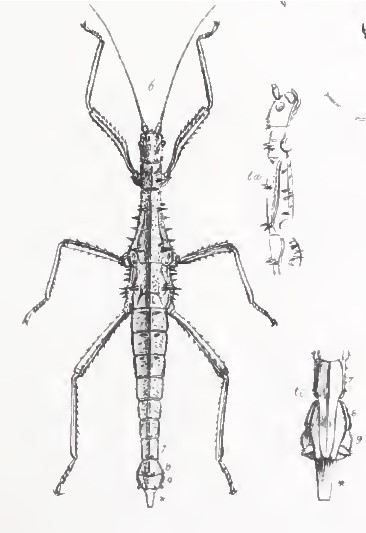
Drawing of a female nymph from Westwood 1859

== Taxonomy ==
John Obadiah Westwood described the species in 1848 as Phasma (Acanthoderus) bufo. The chosen species name "bufo" (Latin and borrowed there for the family of true toads (Bufonidae) or the genus (Bufo)) is not explained. Westwood depicts a female and describes in particular the spines. The description of the males is reduced to the statements that they are smaller and slimmer and have the same spines as the females. In 1859 he transferred the species, like many others, to the former subgenus Acanthoderus, which is now listed as a genus. Here, too, he describes the females and depicts an animal that he suspects to be a juvenile female, but does not rule out that it could also be a male. Whether this is the specimen to which the short description of the male appended in 1848 refers is not clear from the text. This is supported by the fact that among the four syntypes of the species there is also a juvenile female, which was sometimes referred to as a male until the 2020s.

Carl Stål transferred the species in 1875 to the specially for it created genus Obrimus, making it its type species. Joseph Redtenbacher also worked on the species in 1906. He assigned Obrimus mesoplatus, known only from the male holotype, as a synonym of Obrimus bufo and obviously used its holotype to describe the morphology and size of the males. He mentions material from his collection that is said to come from Manila. This specimen from his collection is now in the Natural History Museum, Vienna and is characterized by slightly more pronounced spines. Redtenbacher's synonymization of Obrimus mesoplatus was revised again in 1939 by James Abram Garfield Rehn and his son John William Holman Rehn. They also pointed out that Redtenbacher's specimen from Manila could be either Obrimus bufo or Obrimus uichancoi they had newly described.

Of the four syntypes of the species, one female is deposited at the Oxford University Museum of Natural History. The two remaining adult females and the juvenile female are kept at the Natural History Museum. Frank H. Hennemann chose the Oxford female as the lectotype in 2023, as this is apparently the specimen from which Westwood had described the species in 1848. In addition, for the scientific analysis of the Philippine Obrimini he examined a pair of the species from his collection, which was found by local collectors on June 8, 2010, in the province of Ilocos Norte, and another pair, which was also collected in the Ilocos region by Thierry Heitzmann and Albert Kang and is deposited in the Museum of Natural Sciences in Brussels. These animals are the first records of the species since its description, and both the males and an egg taken from the ovopositor are described for the first time. Hennemann reports on five further specimens deposited in Brussels that are assigned to as Obrimus bufo. One female and three males come from Santa Ana in the province of Cagayan and thus, like the specimens from Ilocos, also from the very north of Luzon, but from considerably further east. The males are much slimmer than those from Ilocos. Their mesonotum is 5.4x longer than it is wide. In the males from Ilocos, it is only 4.2x as long as it is wide. Their mesonotum is 3.25x longer than the pronotum. In the specimens from Ilocos, it is only 2.75x longer than the pronotum. The female is just more green in color than those from Ilocos. Another female comes from the Province of Isabela, much further south. At 11.8 centimetres (4.6 in), it is larger than all other specimens. It has not yet been clarified whether these aspecimens actually belong to Obrimus bufo.
