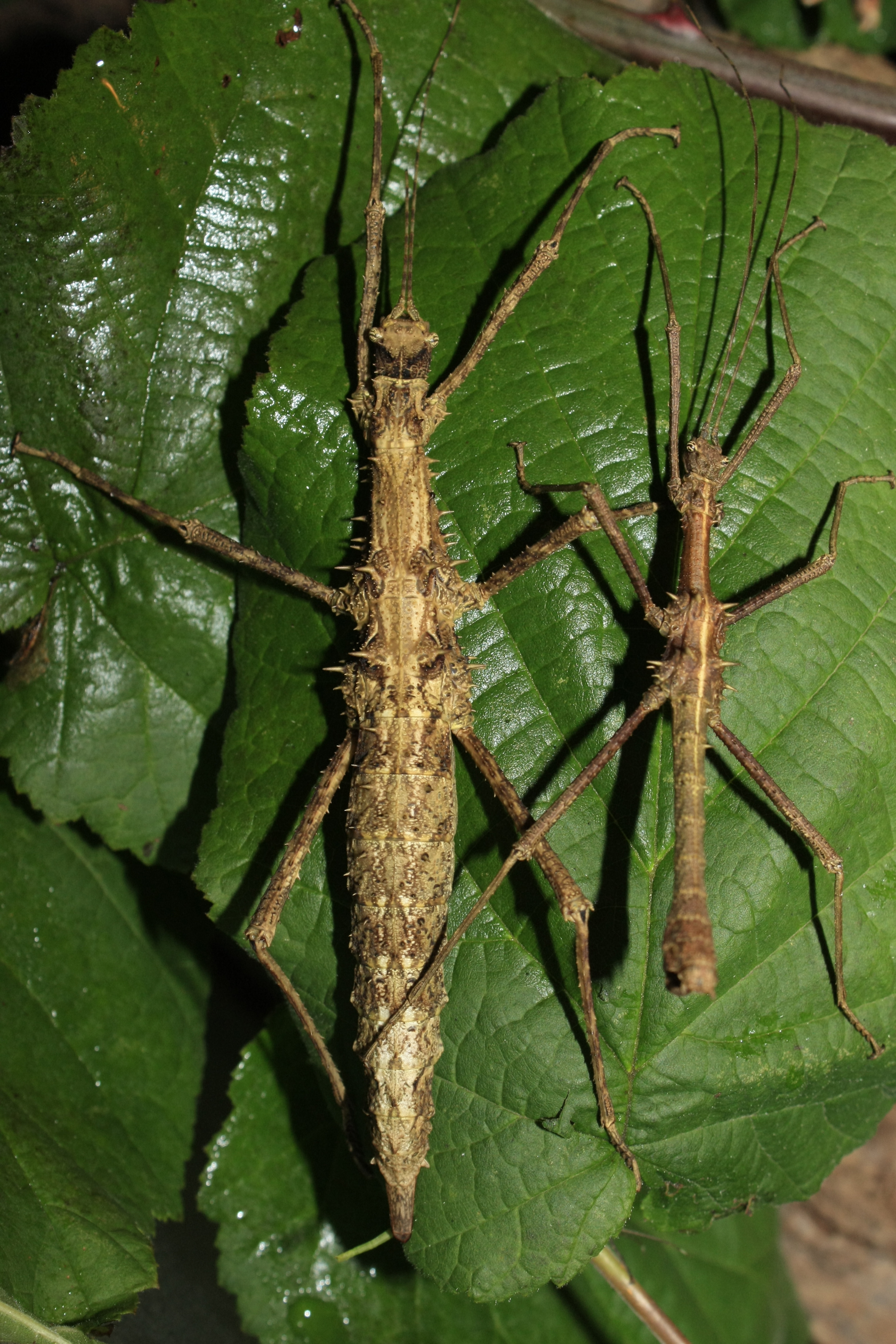
- Obrimus bicolanus, left female, right male

Scientific classification
- Kingdom: Animalia
- Phylum: Arthropoda
- Clade: Pancrustacea
- Class: Insecta
- Order: Phasmatodea
- Family: Heteropterygidae
- Subfamily: Obriminae
- Tribe: Obrimini
- Genus: Obrimus
- Species: O. bicolanus

Binomial name
- Obrimus bicolanus Rehn, J. A. G. & Rehn, J.W.H., 1939

= Obrimus bicolanus =

Species of stick insect

Obrimus bicolanus is a stick insect species from the family of the Heteropterygidae native to the southeast of the Philippine island of Luzon, more precisely in the Bicol Region.

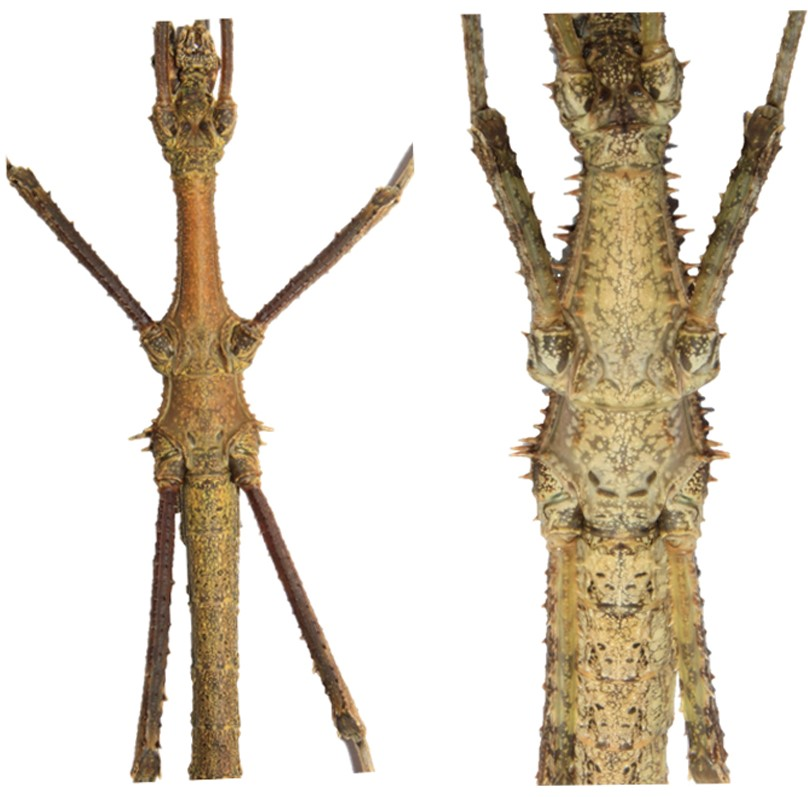
Metasternal slits of Obrimus bicolanus, left ♂, right ♀

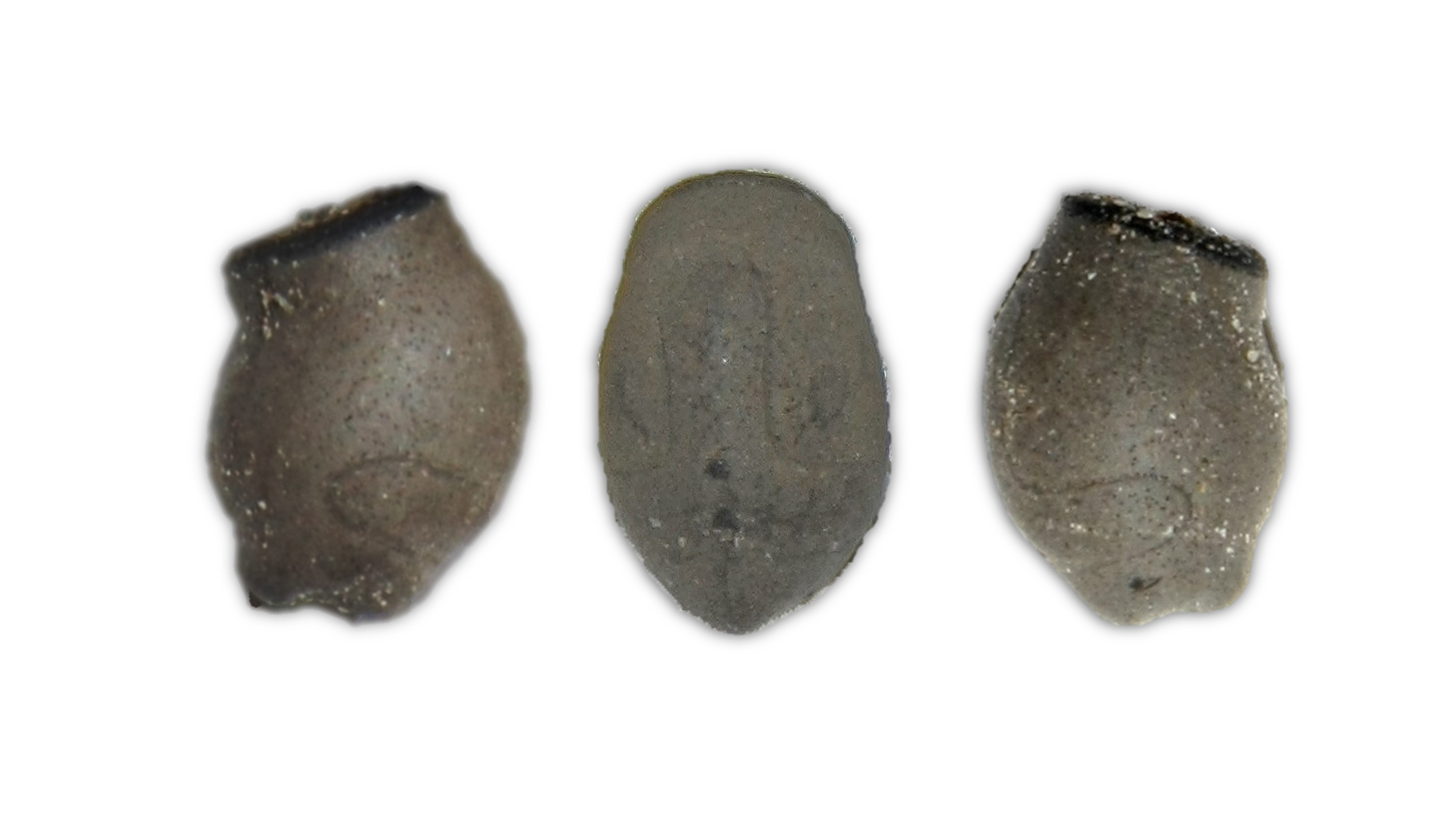
Eggs in different views

== Description ==
In Obrimus bicolanus the slits in the metasternum that are typical for the genus are very narrow and barely visible. They are surrounded by a more or less distinct bulge on the outer edge. The 9.5 to 10.5 centimetres (3.7 to 4.1 in) long females are more variable in color than the males. There are specimens that have patterns in beige, gray, brown or almost black. The underside is completely beige and brown patterned. In size and shape, the female is similar to that of Obrimus uichancoi, from which it can be distinguished by the strongly pronounced medial spines on the mesonotum (median mesonotals), as well as the distinct medials and second paired posterior spines of the abdominal terga I to IV. They can be distinguished from those of the much larger Obrimus bufo by the somewhat stockier body shape, the lack of anterior spines on the pronotum (anterior pronotals), the presence of a second, posterior pair of spines on the terga II to VI of the abdomen, as well as by clear, lateral spines on the terga II to V of the abdomen.

Males reach a length of about 6.2 to 6.7 centimetres (2.4 to 2.6 in) and are very slender. They are usually grey-brown or grey-green in colour. The metathorax and the underside of the meso- and metathorax are usually fawn-brown, while the rest of the underside, including the abdomen, has brown speckles on a beige background. There is often a characteristic, light, usually yellowish longitudinal stripe on the upper side of the body. It begins at the pronotum and can extend halfway down the abdomen. The spines on the head and body are the same as those of Obrimus bufo males. However, these are usually significantly larger, at more than 6.8 centimetres (2.7 in) in length. In addition, the anal segment of the males of Obrimus bicolanus is almost hexagonal, while in Obrimus bufo it is rather broadened transversely.

== Occurrence ==
All known localities of the species are in the province of Sorsogon in the Bicol in southeastern Luzon. The holotype was collected in 1918 in Bulusan. All other localities are further north. A male specimen was collected by Thierry Heitzmann and Albert Kang in October 2009 on Mount Osiao. Heitzmann found further specimens in September and October 2010 and in 2011 on Mount Pulog in Mt. Pulog National Park in the Pocdol Mountains.

== Reproduction ==
The females lay about five eggs per week using the straight, beak-shaped ovipositor. These are 5.4 to 5.5 millimetres (0.21 to 0.22 in) long, 3.7 to 3.8 millimetres (0.15 to 0.15 in) wide and 3.9 to 4.0 millimetres (0.15 to 0.16 in) high, bulbous and of a typical shape for the genus. The capsule is grey, slightly domed and resembles that of the genus Sungaya except for the transverse indentation at the lower pole that is only typical for Obrimus, which makes the eggs there appear double-humped. The dorsal surface is much more convex than the ventral surface. The micropylar plate is 3.8 millimetres (0.15 in) long and the three armes forms an inverted T. Its outer edge is dark grey. The lid (operculum) is round, flat and sits on the capsule with an opercular angle of about 25° sloping towards the ventral side. In Obrimus bufo this is only 15°. The outer edge of the lid is blackish.

== Taxonomy ==
James Abram Garfield Rehn and his son John William Holman Rehn described Obrimus bicolanus as one of two new Obrimus species in 1939. The chosen species name "bicolanus" refers to the type locality of the species, the Bicol Region. Rehn and Rehn described the species from a juvenile female from the collection of Morgan Hebard, which was collected by W. Boettcher in September 1918 in Bulusan. It is deposited as the holotype at the Academy of Natural Sciences in Philadelphia. This female in the penultimate larval stage is heavily damaged. The right hind leg is completely missing and the abdomen is broken off in the middle, but is still next to the holotype.

Frank H. Hennemann examined 25 males and 25 females for the scientific study of the Philippine Obrimini. These included the following specimens deposited at the Museum of Natural Sciences in Brussels: the male collected by Heitzmann and Kang in 2009, two females and one male (collected by Heitzmann in 2011), as well as two females and one male from the breeding of Joachim Bresseel (deposited in 2013), which went back to specimens collected by Heitzmann in 2010. He also examined 19 females and 22 males from his breeding, which also went back to the animals collected by Heitzmann in 2010 (prepared between 2011 and 2014), as well as two females found by local collectors in October 2010. All specimens not deposited in Brussels are in Hennemann's collection.

== In terraristics ==
Heitzmann was able to successfully breed the animals he found at Mt. Pulog National Park in the Pocdol Mountains. Bresseel, who identified the species, Hennemann and Bruno Kneubühler were also able to breed them in 2011 from the eggs Heitzmann sent to Europe. The latter initially referred to the species as Obrimus sp. 'Pulog', later as Obrimus bicolanus 'Pulog'. The Phasmid Study Group lists the species under the PSG number 324. Animals from this breeding line are no longer in breeding.

Obrimus bicolanus feeds on the leaves of bramble and raspberries, hazel, oaks, Salal or hawthorns. Keeping and breeding is not a problem if the air humidity is slightly increased. To enable egg laying, the floor of the terrarium should be covered with a slightly moist substrate of soil a few centimeters high.

== Gallery ==
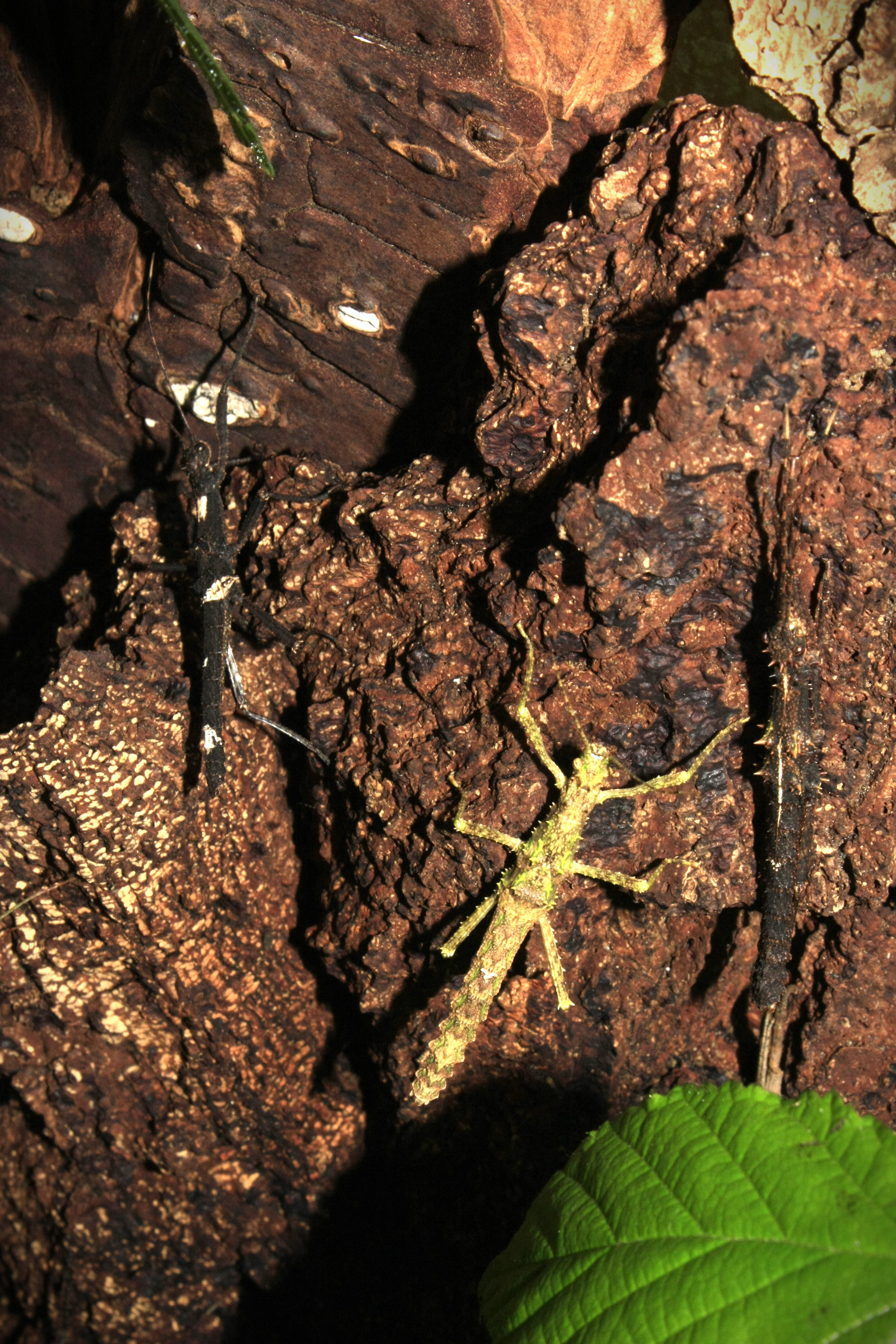
Differently colored nymphs

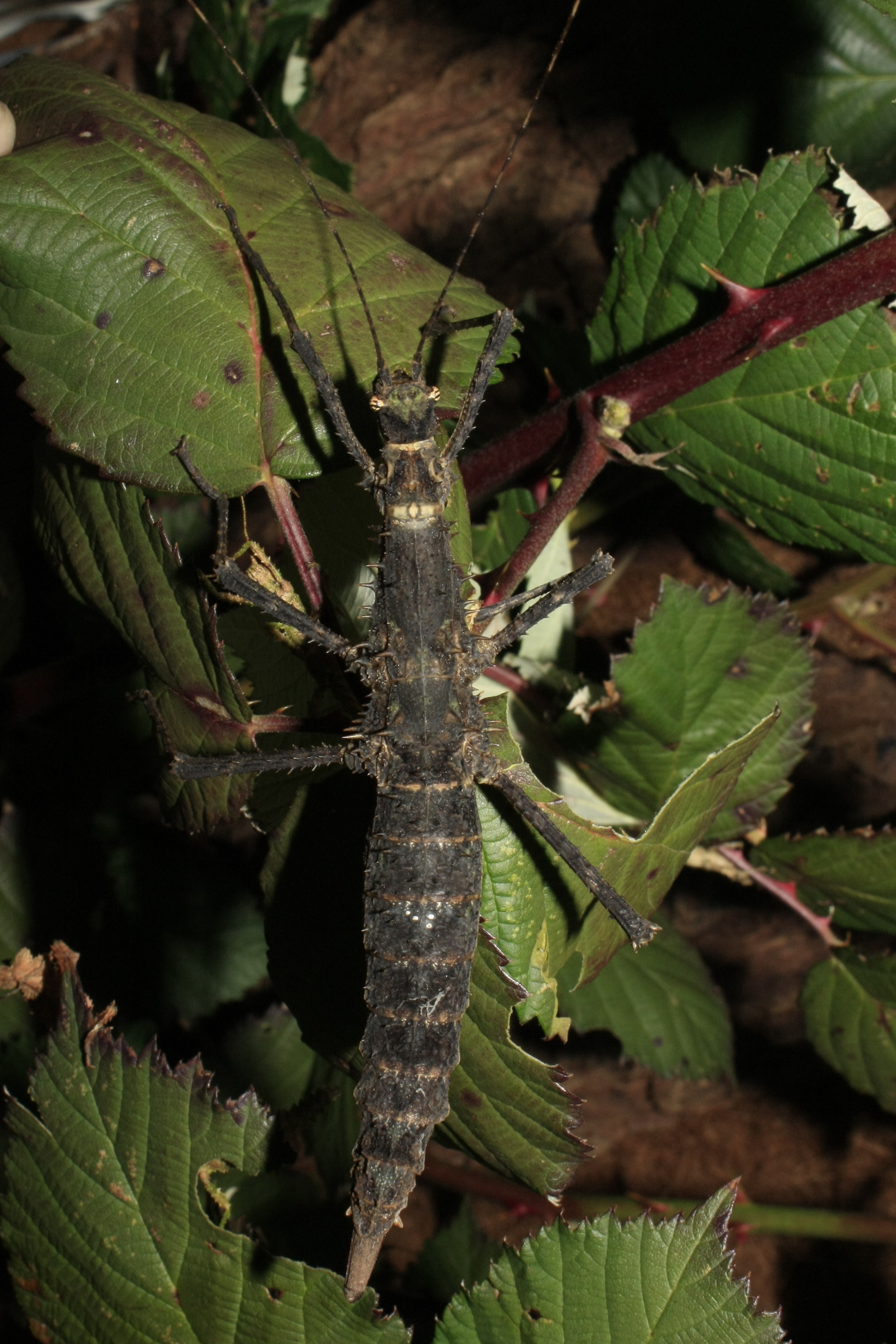
Dark colored female

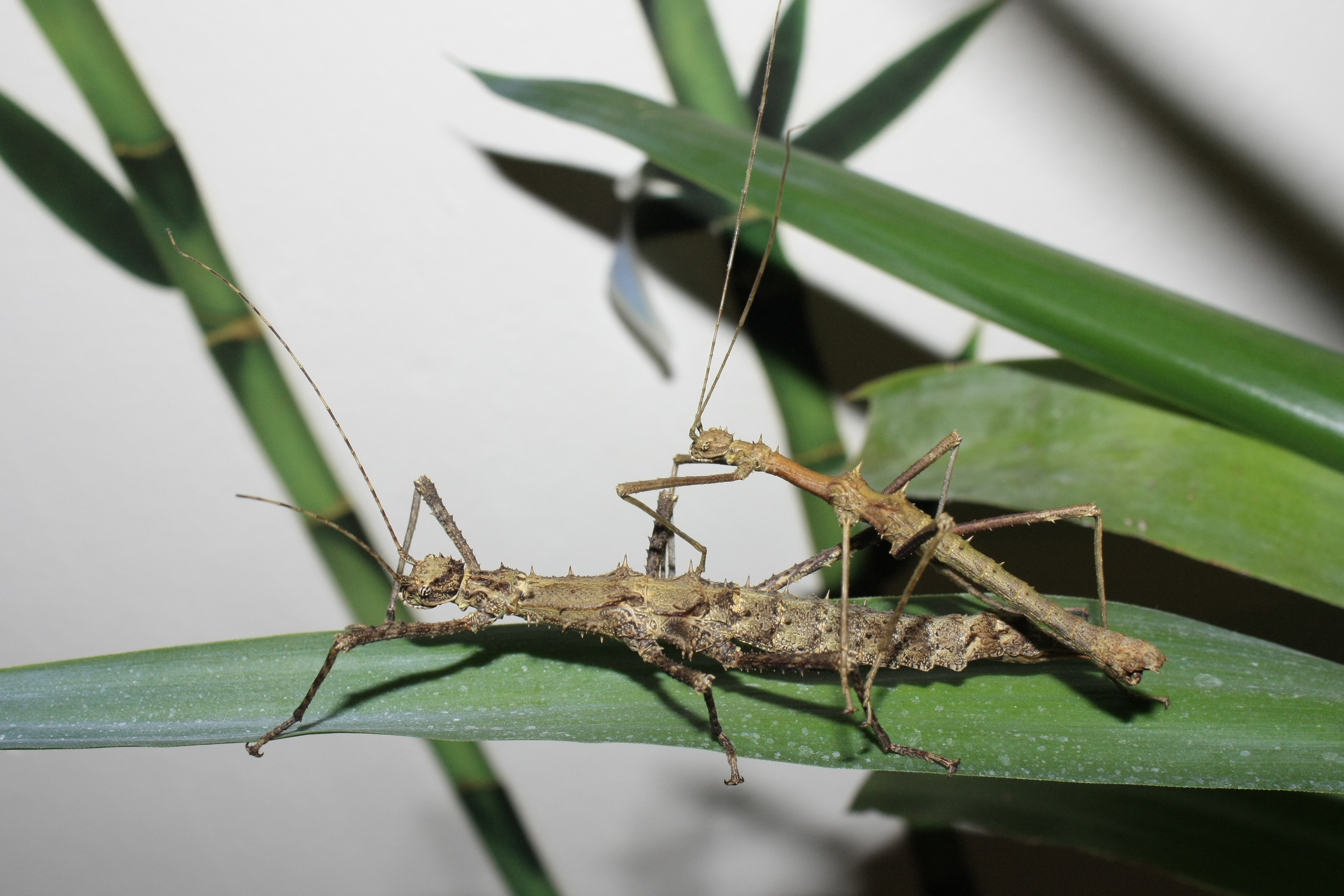
Pair

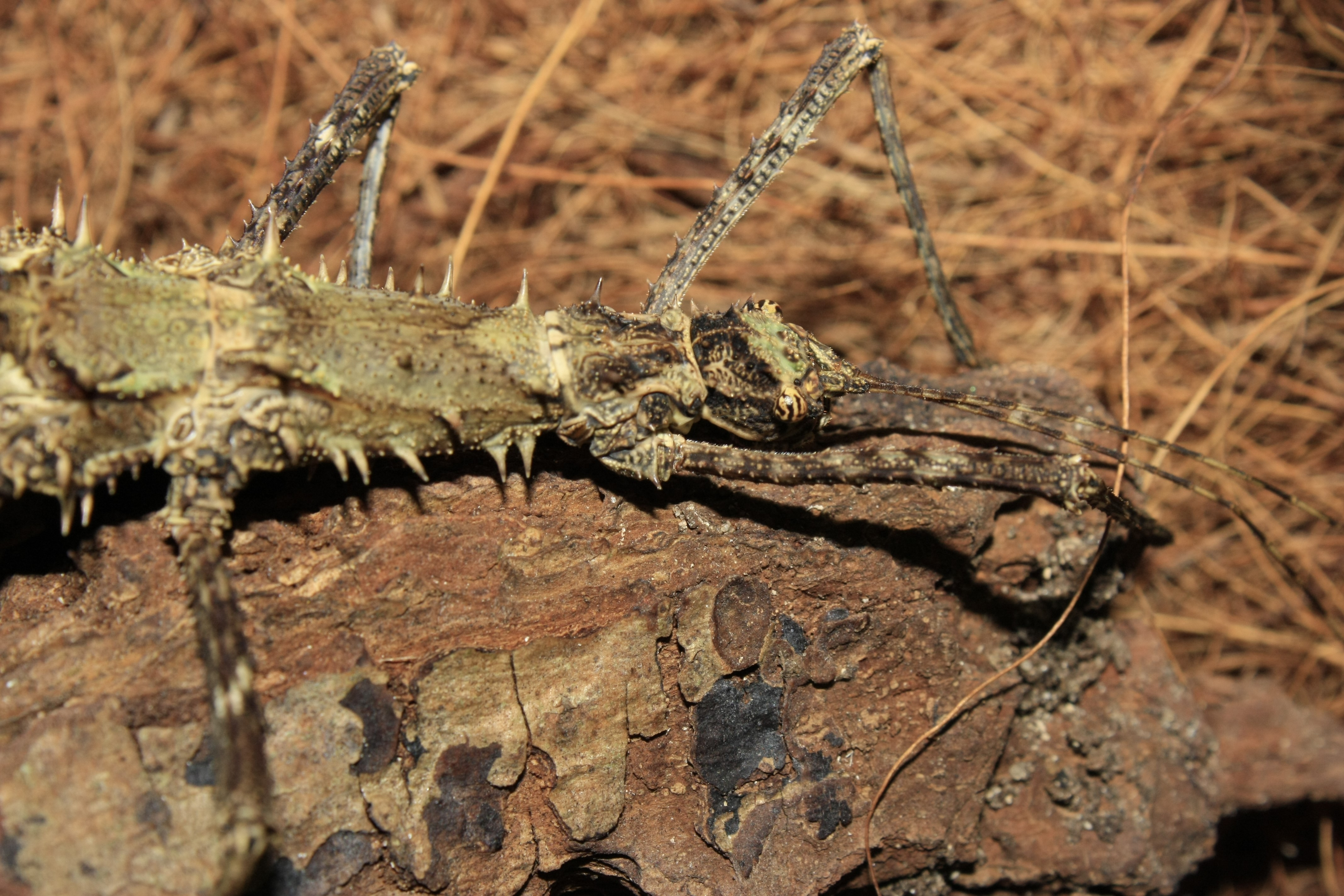
Portrait of a female

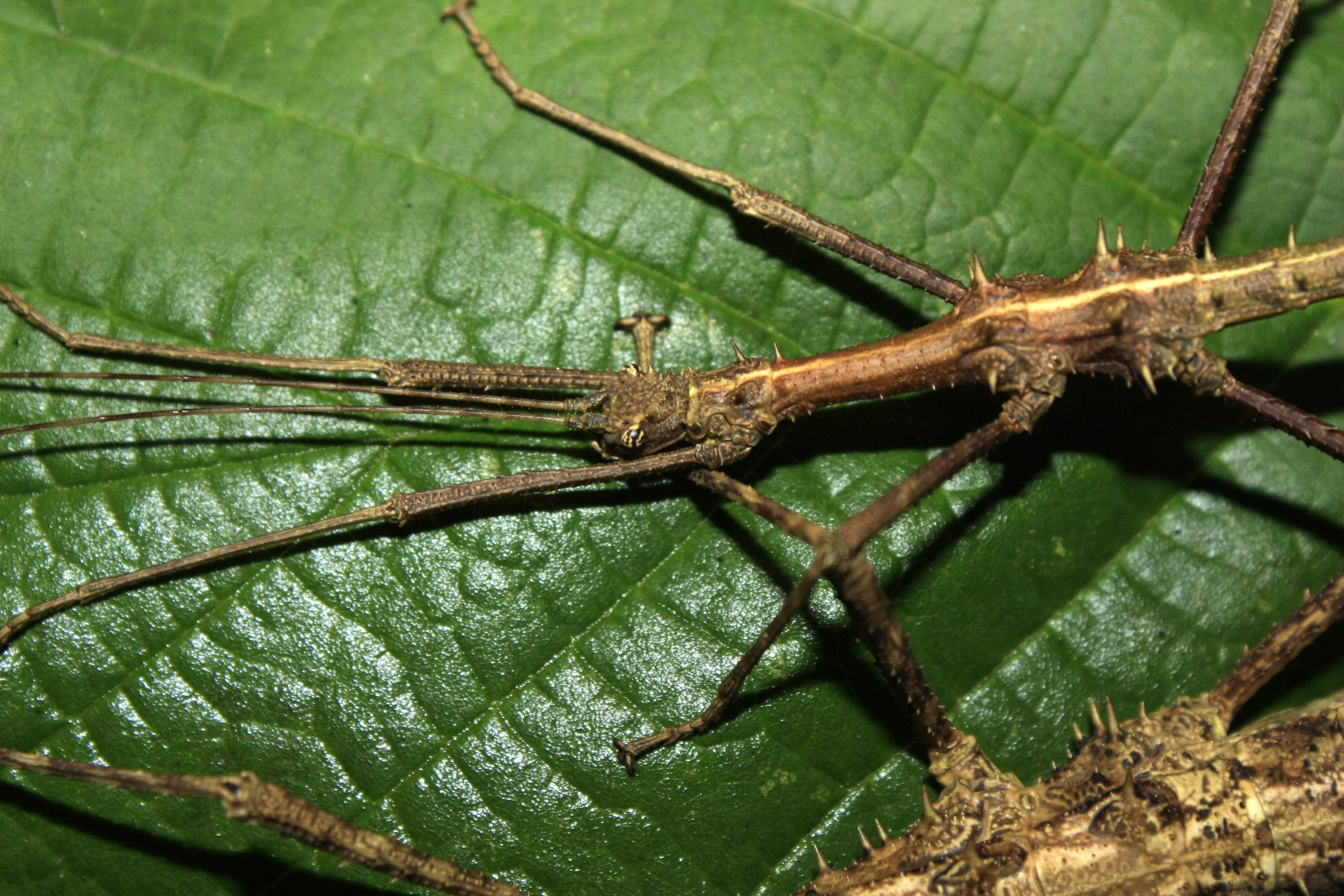
Portrait of a male
