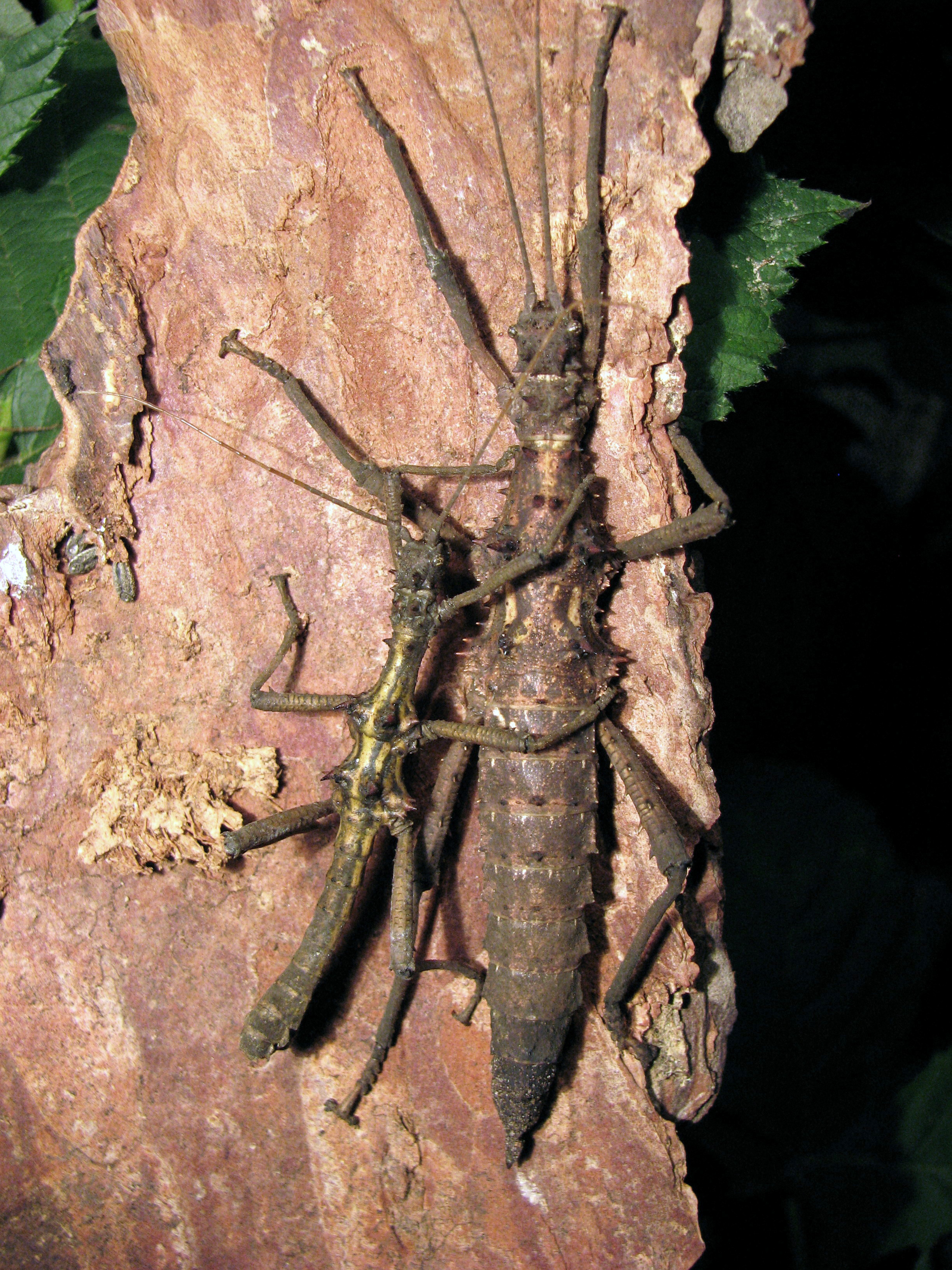
- Aretaon asperrimus, pair

Scientific classification
- Domain: Eukaryota
- Kingdom: Animalia
- Phylum: Arthropoda
- Class: Insecta
- Order: Phasmatodea
- Family: Heteropterygidae
- Subfamily: Obriminae
- Tribe: Obrimini
- Genus: Aretaon
- Species: A. asperrimus

Binomial name
- Aretaon asperrimus (Redtenbacher, 1906)

Synonyms
- Obrimus asperrimus Redtenbacher, 1906

= Aretaon asperrimus =

Species of stick insect

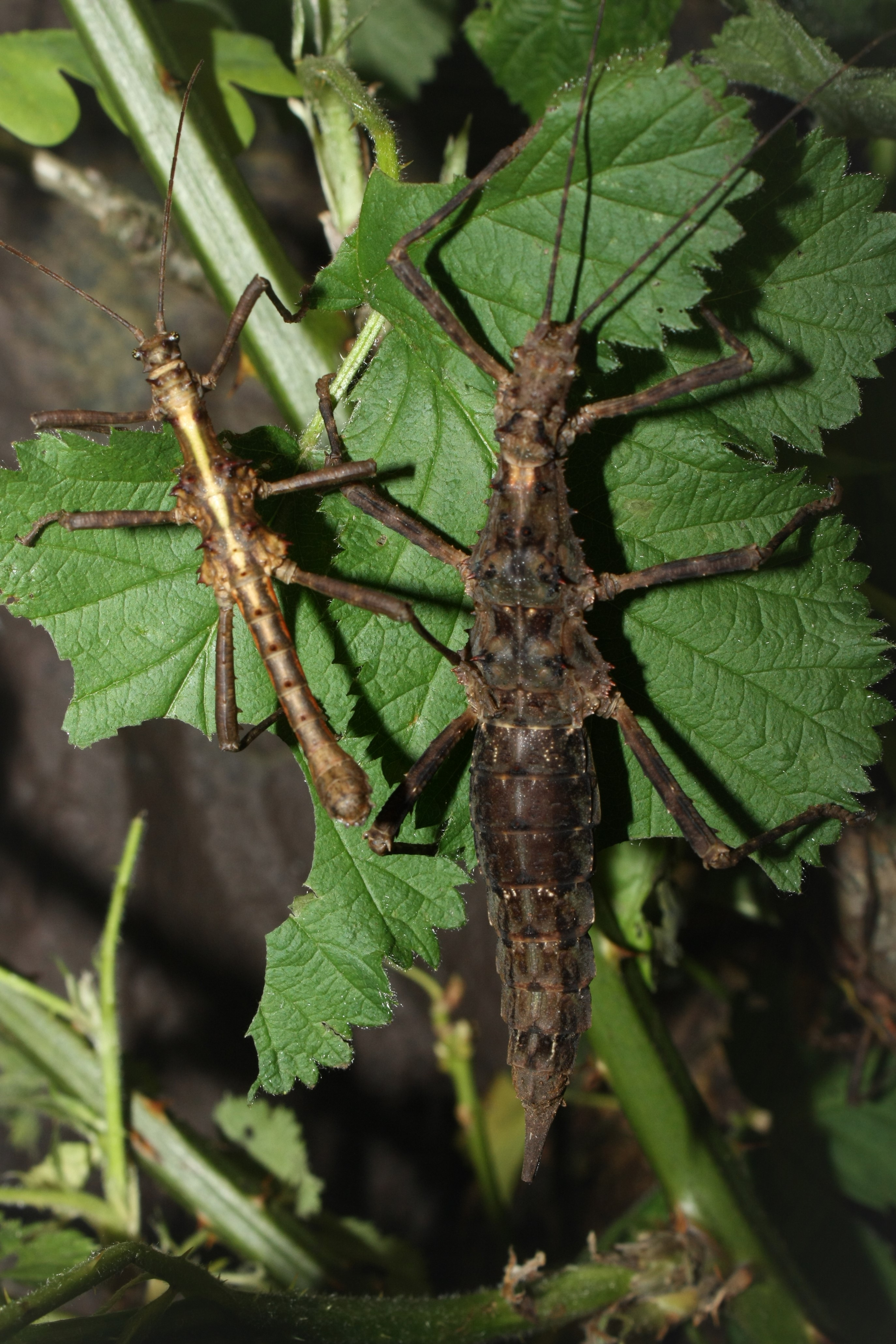
Pair from philippine island Palawan

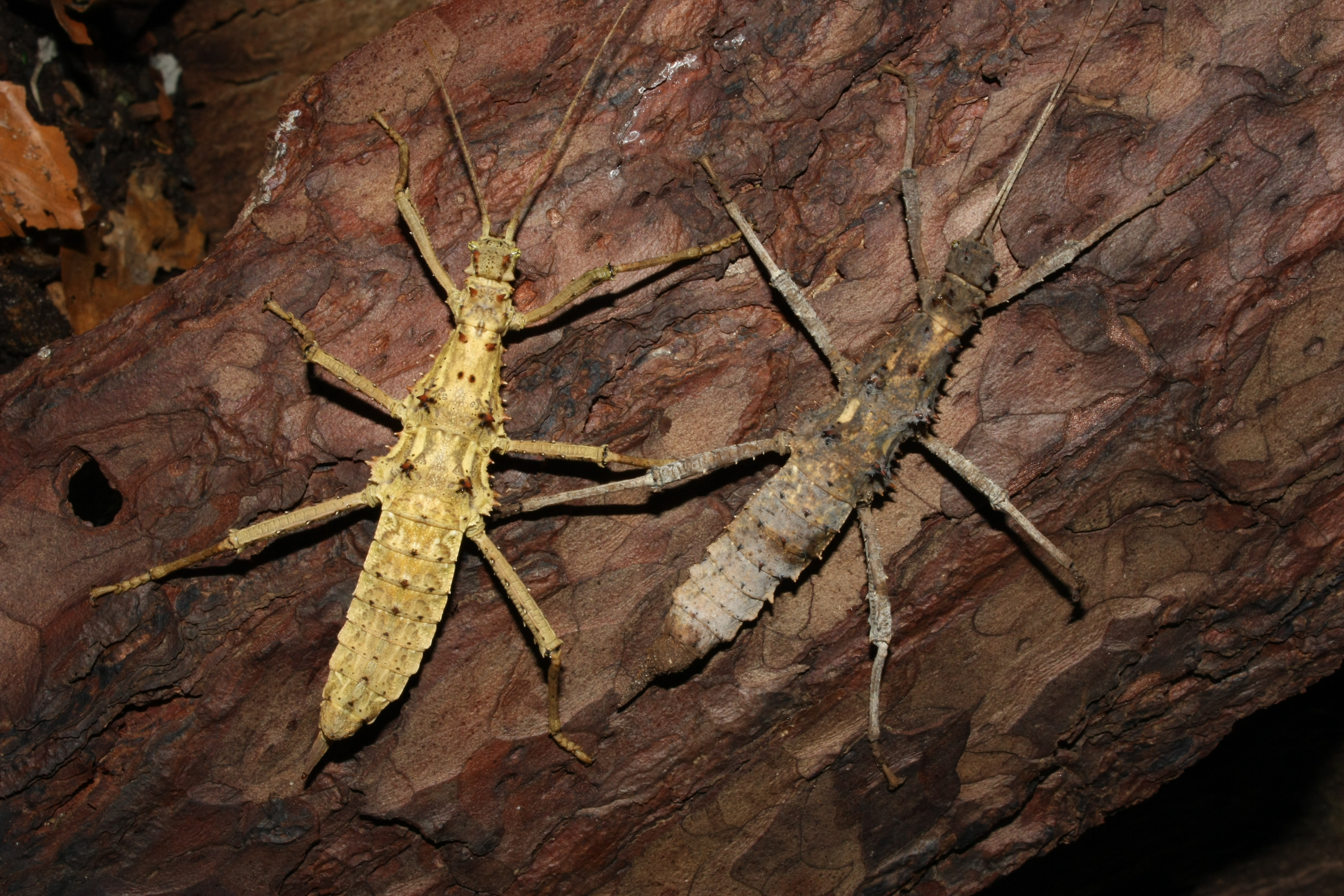
Very light colored and normally colored females

Aretaon asperrimus is a species of insect in the Aretaon genus of the Phasmatodea order. The sometimes used common name thorny stick insect is a bit misleading, since the species does not correspond to the typical stick-like habitus and many other species are thorny as well.

== Characteristics ==
Both sexes are completely wingless and have conspicuous thorns. Their eyes are mottled dark-brown and yellow. On the head, the pro- and the metathorax there is a pair, on the mesothorax two pairs of thorns are particularly well developed. These thorns are dark, red-brown, black-brown towards the tips. The rear pair on the mesothorax and that on the metathorax have even smaller side spines at their base. They stand out particularly clearly due to their contrast to the otherwise brown and beige marbled body of the female, or the male, which is drawn with yellow vertical stripes on a brown background. The legs, which are also brown, are thorny too.

In addition to these normal-colored animals, very light-colored animals can occasionally be found in which the brown colors are lighter, sometimes light beige. As a result, the parts of the thorns that then appear wine-red are much more noticeable. In addition, the colors can fade significantly in the course of life, and older females in particular often appear as if they were covered with a layer of lime. In addition to the more brown and pale yellow to beige colored animals from Borneo, the animals from Palawan appear more colorful or at least more contrasting. The females are generally darker in color. In addition to dark brown colors, there are also lighter colors, which can also be pale green, especially in the area of the rear abdomen and the thorax. A more or less characteristic pattern consisting of these greenish, dark brown and beige to pale yellow areas can often be found on the thorax.

The previously known males from Palawan are much more colorful than those from Borneo. A light, almost yellow stripe on the meso- and metanotum that narrows slightly from front to back forms a striking contrast to the dark brown basic color. Meso- and metasternum are colored bright orange. Their abdomen is brown on top, bright orange on the sides and pale orange from below. In the habitus both sexes correspond to the sexual dimorphism typical of the tribe Obrimini, in which the 5.0 to 6.0 centimetres (2.0 to 2.4 in) long males have a relatively slender abdomen with thicker end segments and the larger females with a length of 8.0 to 9.0 centimetres (3.1 to 3.5 in) have a wider abdomen, which swells significantly during the period of egg laying and ends in a pointed, secondary ovipositor.

== Distribution, life course and reproduction ==
Aretaon asperrimus is native to the Malay part of Borneo. Here it can be found especially in the north of the island, in Sabah. Another locality of the species is the Philippine island Palawan. It should also appear on Labuan and Luzon, more precisely in Benguet.

The nocturnal insects prefer to hide on or behind the bark of the food plants during the day. The males allow themselves to be carried around by the females for days before, during and after mating. Four to five weeks after the last moult, the females begin to lay an average of one to a maximum of two cylindrical eggs a day with the ovipositor in the soil. These are 5.5 millimetres (0.22 in) long, 2.5 millimetres (0.098 in) high, 2.8 millimetres (0.11 in) wide and about 25 mg in weight. They resemble the faeces of their parents and have a micropylar plate in the shape of an upside-down Y. The ends of the lower legs of the micropylar plate reach the ventral side of the egg in about 40% of the eggs. Macroscopically, they can be distinguished from the eggs of Trachyaretaon carmelae by the arm of the micropylar plate that widens towards the lid (operculum).

Depending on the temperature, the nymphs hatch, which are already 18 millimetres (0.71 in) long when hatched, usually after 12 to 13 weeks, rarely after four to five months. Adolescent nymphs have considerably more thorns to protect against predators than adults. This is an adaptation that can also be found in other representatives of tribe Obrimini and takes into account the softer exoskeleton of the nymphs. Usually the adolescent nymphs have a lively beige to brown pattern. But there are also animals with a green basic color.

== Taxonomy ==
The species was described by Josef Redtenbacher in 1906 under the basionym Obrimus asperrimus. In the same publication he described another species as Obrimus muscosus on the basis of some very thorny 4.7 to 6.4 centimetres (1.9 to 2.5 in) long nymphs. Both species were transferred in 1938/39 by James Abram Garfield Rehn and his son John William Holman Rehn to the newly established genus Aretaon. Oliver Zompro placed Aretaeon muscosus as a synonym to Aretaon asperrimus. Francis Seow -Choen revalidated the species in 2016. So there are no synonyms except the basionym. The specific name "asperrimus" refers to the rough, prickly body surface (Latin: asper 'rough, coarse'; and rimosus 'cracked, full of crevices').

The syntypes of Aretaon asperrimus are in the Natural History Museum Vienna, in the Museo Nacional de Ciencias Naturales in Madrid and in the Zoological Museum of the Russian Academy of Sciences in St. Petersburg.

== Terraristic ==
Aretaon asperrimus was introduced for the first time in 1992 and a second time in 1996 for terrariums. Both stocks come from Mount Kinabalu and were collected at a height of around 480 metres (1,570 ft). The Phasmid Study Group has it under PSG number 118. In 2010, Joachim Bresseel collected an Aretaon female from Mount Gantung in Palawan, from whose abdomen he was able to dissect four eggs. From these hatched a male and a female. These were the basis for a stock that has been in breeding since then, which was initially called Aretaon sp. 'Palawan'. Representatives of this stock are listed under PSG number 329. A study published in 2021 by Sarah Bank et al to the phylogenesis of the Heteropterygidae, proved on the basis of genetic analysis the affiliation of this stock to Aretaon asperrimus, which since then has been referred to as Aretaon asperrimus 'Palawan'.

A. asperrimus is one of the easiest Phasmatodea species to keep and to breed. Also eaten are ivy, oak, hazel, European beech, and Rosaceae like bramble, and Crataegus (hawthorns). The food plants are placed as leafy twigs in narrow-necked vases in the terrarium and sprayed with water about every two days. To lay eggs, a five-centimeter-high layer of a slightly damp humus-sand mixture should cover the ground. The eggs can be left in the ground or transferred to a simple incubator for better control.

== Gallery ==
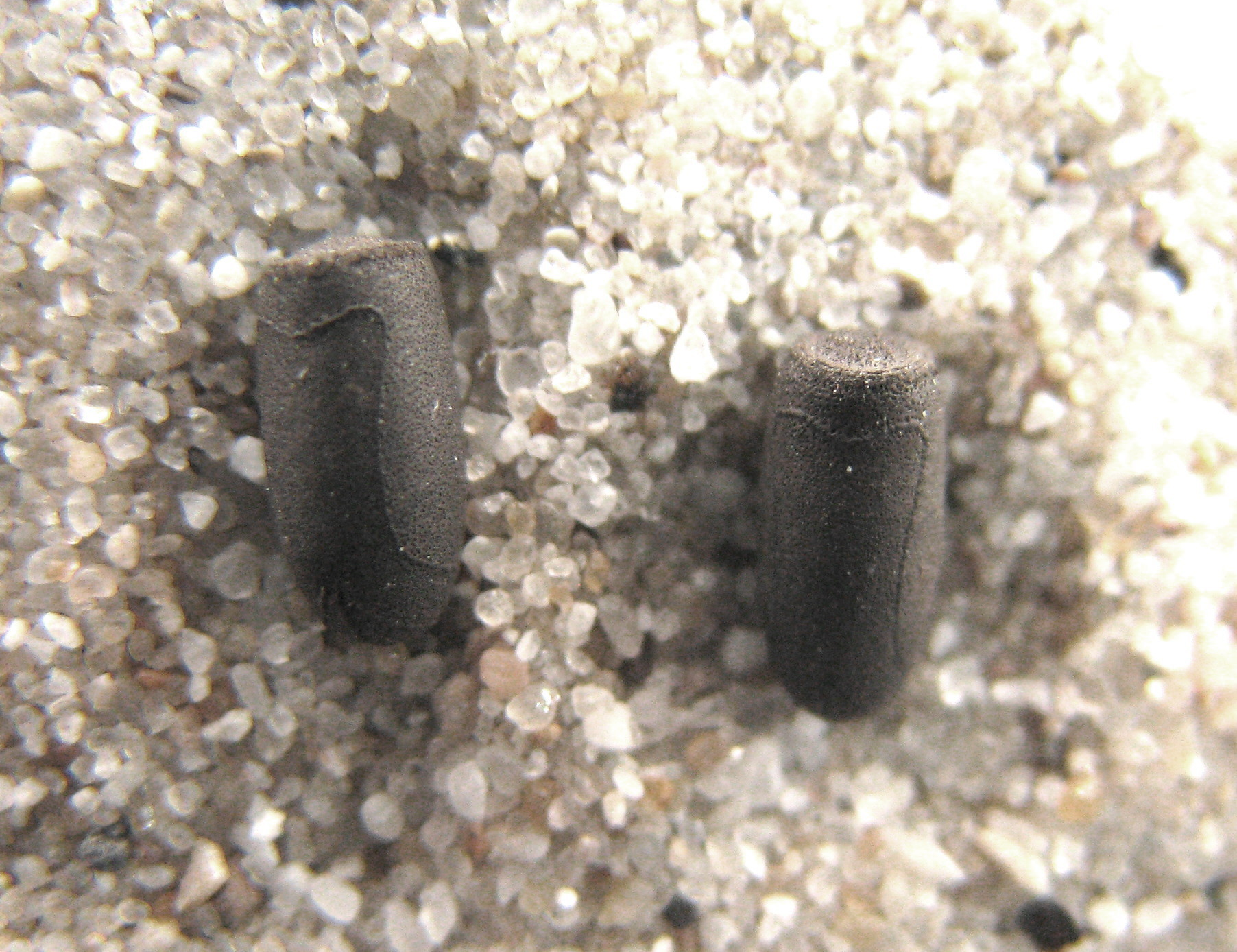
Eggs

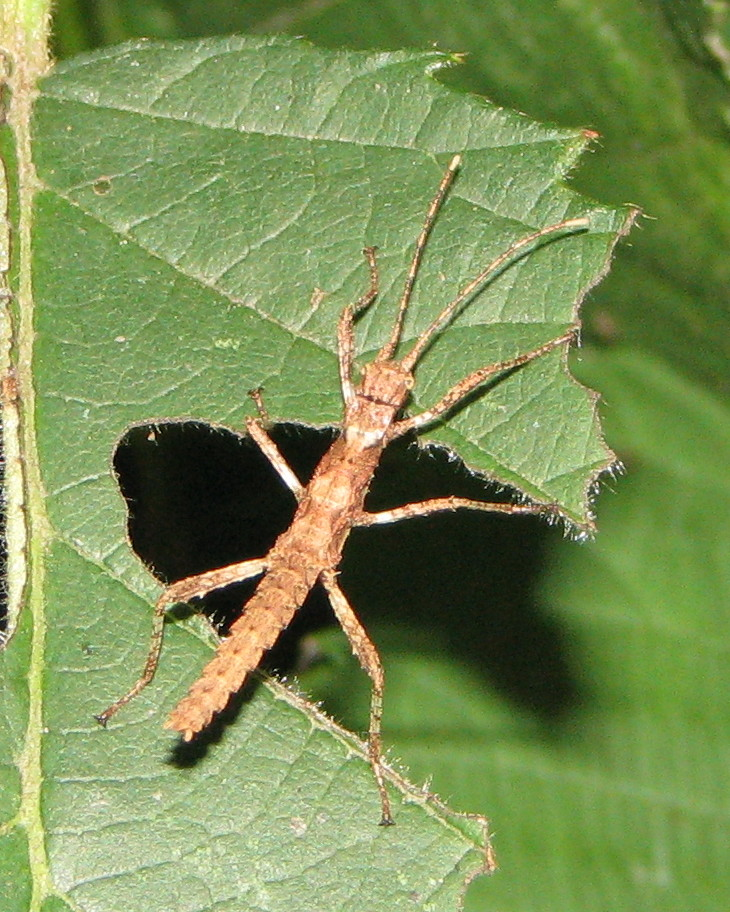
L1 nymph

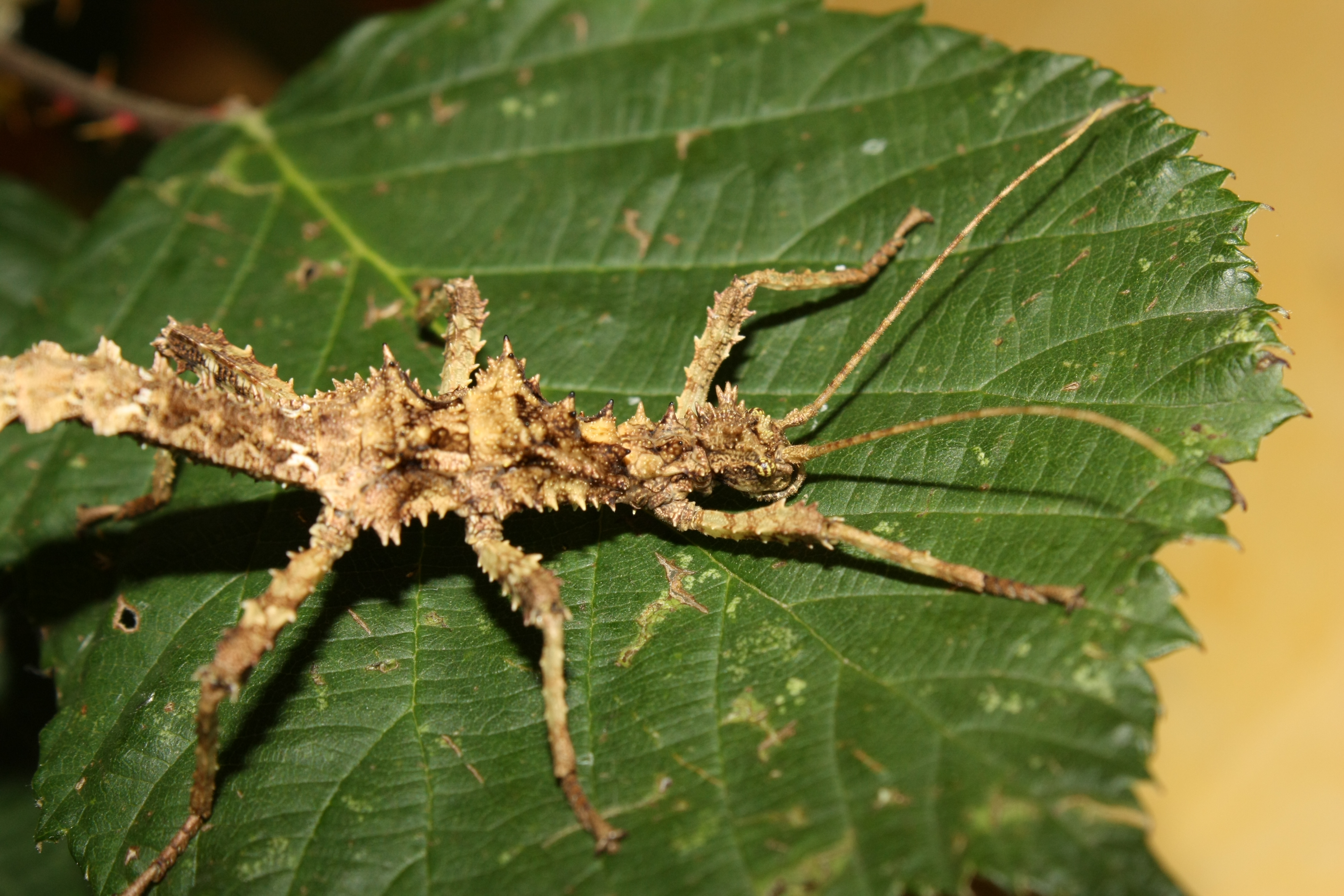
female nymph

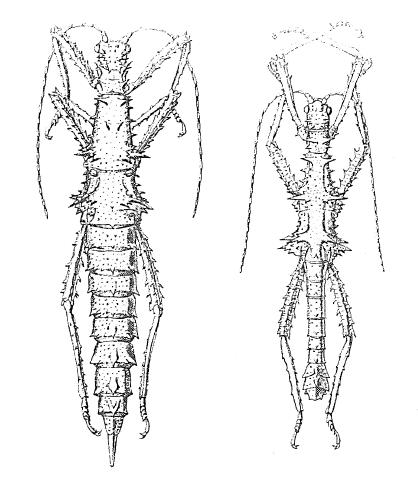
Illustrations (plate. I, fig. 4 & 5) from Redtenbachers first description
