= Acanthoderus =

Scientific classification
- Domain: Eukaryota
- Kingdom: Animalia
- Phylum: Arthropoda
- Class: Insecta
- Order: Phasmatodea
- Family: Phasmatidae
- Tribe: Pachymorphini
- Genus: Acanthoderus; Gray, 1835
- Species: A. spinosus

Binomial name
- Acanthoderus spinosus (Gray, 1834)

Genus of stick insects

Acanthoderus is a monotypic genus of stick insects in the tribe Pachymorphini. The single species Acanthoderus spinosus has a known distribution in Australia.

From 1859 until 1875 the similar but unrelated Hoploclonia gecko was placed in the genus Acanthoderus.

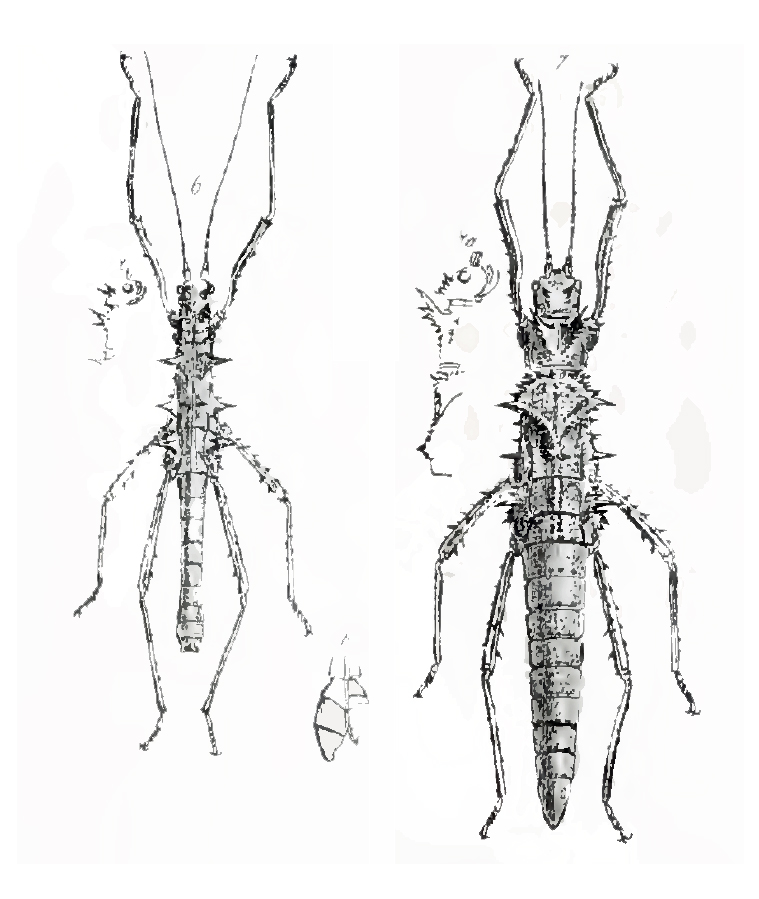
"Acanthoderus gecko" in the description of Gray, 1859
