= Brasidas foveolatus =

Scientific classification
- Kingdom: Animalia
- Phylum: Arthropoda
- Clade: Pancrustacea
- Class: Insecta
- Order: Phasmatodea
- Family: Heteropterygidae
- Subfamily: Obriminae
- Tribe: Obrimini
- Genus: Brasidas
- Species: B. foveolatus

Binomial name
- Brasidas foveolatus (Redtenbacher, 1906)

Synonyms
- Obrimus foveolatus Redtenbacher, 1906

Species of stick insect

Brasidas foveolatus is a species of stick insects from the family Heteropterygidae native to the Philippine archipelago Mindanao.

== Description ==
In habitus the species corresponds to typical representatives of the Obrimini. As with all Brasidas species, Brasidas foveolatus has a pair of characteristic holes in the metasternum. As with Brasidas cavernosus and Brasidas samarensis, these are only formed as flat pits surrounded on the outside by a fold and a row of grains. The females of the species are not known. The only known specimen is the 63.5 millimetres (2.50 in) long male holotype. There is a pair of spines on the second, third and fourth tergum of its abdomen.

== Taxonomy ==
Josef Redtenbacher described this species as Obrimus foveolatus in 1906 based on the only known male originally deposited in the Muséum national d'histoire naturelle in Paris. This specimen, considered the holotype, cannot be found in the MNHN and is considered missing.

James Abram Garfield Rehn and his son John William Holman Rehn transferred the species in 1938/39 to their newly created genus Brasidas, which they distinguished from the newly described genus Euobrimus (now synonym of Brasidas) by the semicingulate (= "half-girdled") metasternal holes, in which these were described as cingulate (= "girdled"). In Brasidas they transferred not only Obrimus foveolatus, but also Obrimus quadratipes (now back in Obrimus) and described four further new species. They also described the subspecies Brasidas foveolatus asper based on a single male collected by Baker in Davao on Mindanao. This male was deposited as the holotype of the subspecies in the National Museum of Natural History (NMNH) in Washington, D.C.. Rehn and Rehn examined three males of Brasidas foveolatus foveolatus, also collected by Baker on Mindanao in Tangcolan in the province of Bukidnon. One of these came from the collection of Morgan Hebard, the other two from the NMNH. With total lengths of 54 to 58 millimetres (2.1 to 2.3 in), all three remain somewhat smaller than the 63.5 millimetres (2.50 in) long male described by Redtenbacher and thus fit better with the very variable Brasidas lacerta. Rehn and Rehn distinguish the nominotypical subspecies from the newly described subspecies Brasidas foveolatus asper based on the structure of the pro- and mesonotum, in particular the development of spines and tubercles. Frank H. Hennemann synonymized the subspecies with Brasidas lacerta in 2023.

Since Redtenbacher describes the metasternal pits of foveolatus in the 1906 species description as being just as developed as those of Obrimus quadratipes, the species could also be a representative of the genus Obrimus in which he originally described it. However, Redtenbacher probably only had the description of Obrimus quadratipes and no specimen to compare the metasternal pits. He calls Obrimus bufo and Obrimus quadratipes, which he considers to be synonym, species without holes or pits in the metasternum. Here, too, it is not known whether he only had the description or also specimens. For this reason, Hennemann leaves the species in the genus Brasidas.

== In terraristics ==
All specimens previously introduced, kept and distributed under the name Brasidas foveolatus were identified by Hennemann in 2023 as representatives of Brasidas lacerta. This also applies to the breeding strain of Mount Apo, which is maintained by the Phasmid Study Group under the PSG number 301 until mid-2024.
