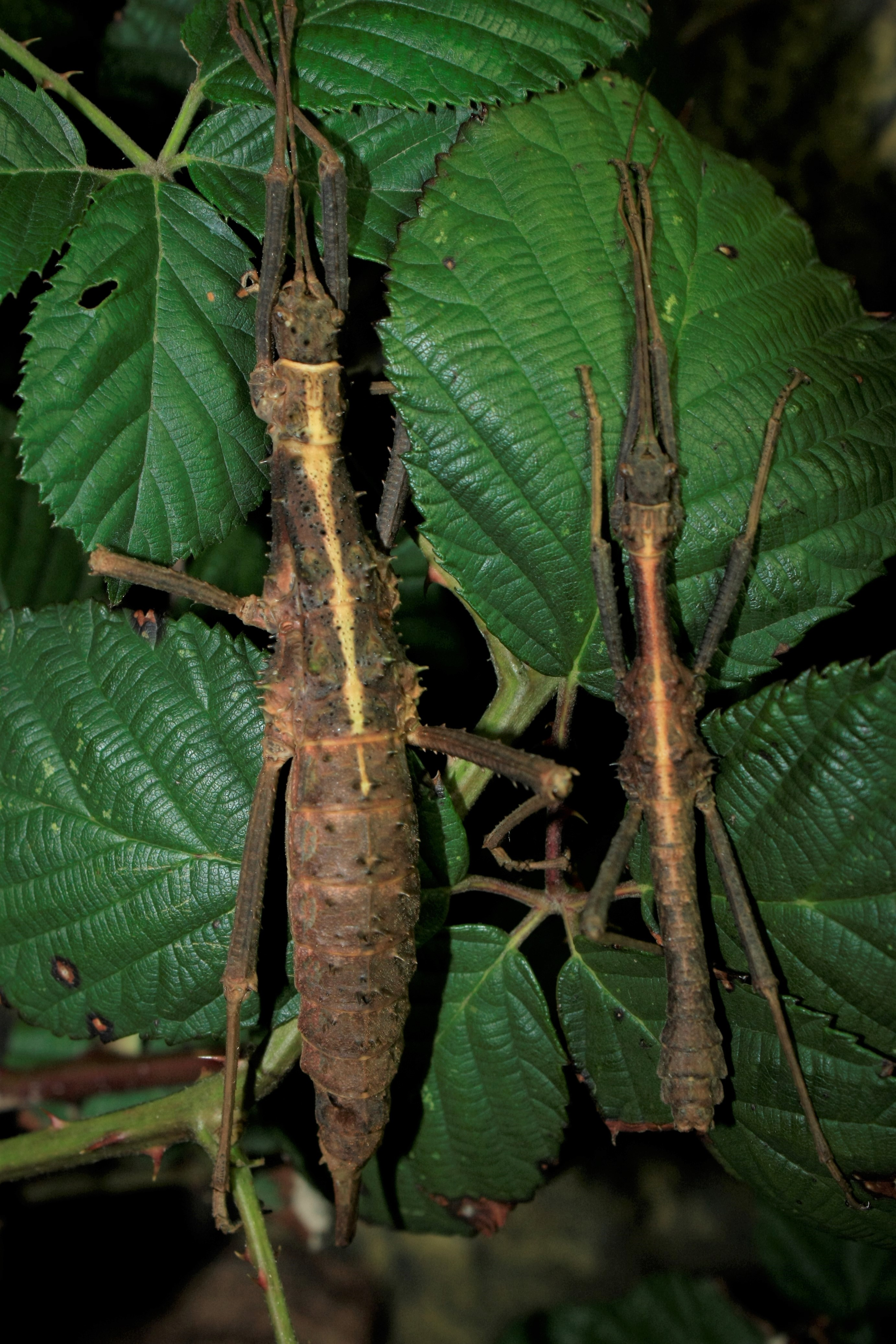
- Brasidas cavernosus, from Mount Pulog (PSG No. 377), left female, right male

Scientific classification
- Kingdom: Animalia
- Phylum: Arthropoda
- Class: Insecta
- Order: Phasmatodea
- Superfamily: Bacilloidea
- Family: Heteropterygidae
- Subfamily: Obriminae
- Tribe: Obrimini
- Genus: Brasidas; Rehn, J.A.G. & Rehn, J.W.H., 1939

Type species
- Brasidas samarensis Rehn, J.A.G. & Rehn, J.W.H., 1939

Species
- List: Brasidas bakeri; Brasidas cavernosus; Brasidas foveolatus; Brasidas lacerta; Brasidas malaki; Brasidas manobo; Brasidas rehni; Brasidas samarensis; Brasidas viscayanus; Brasidas waray

Synonyms
- Euobrimus Rehn, J.A.G. & Rehn, J.W.H., 1939

= Brasidas (insect) =

Genus of stick insects

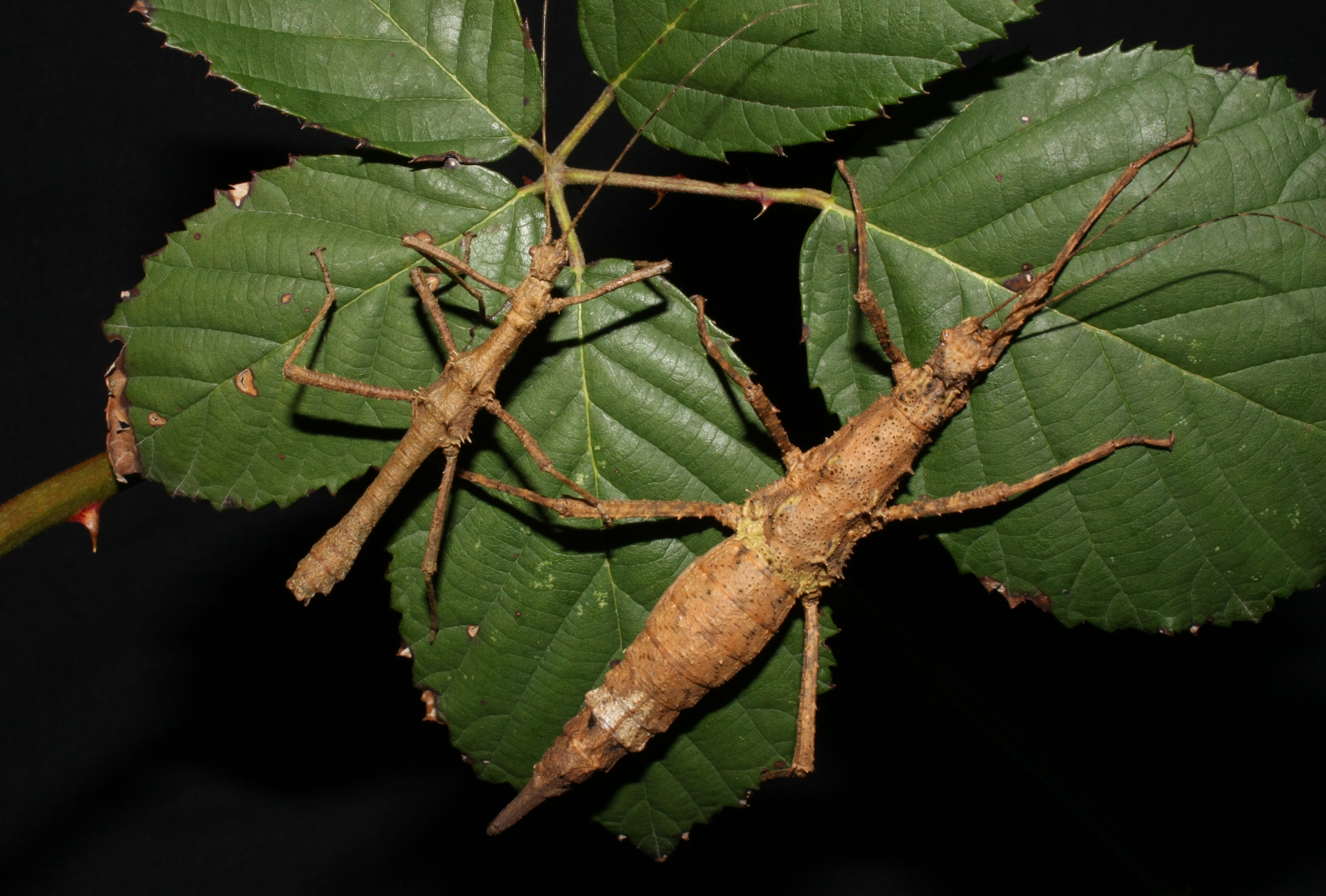
Brasidas lacerta

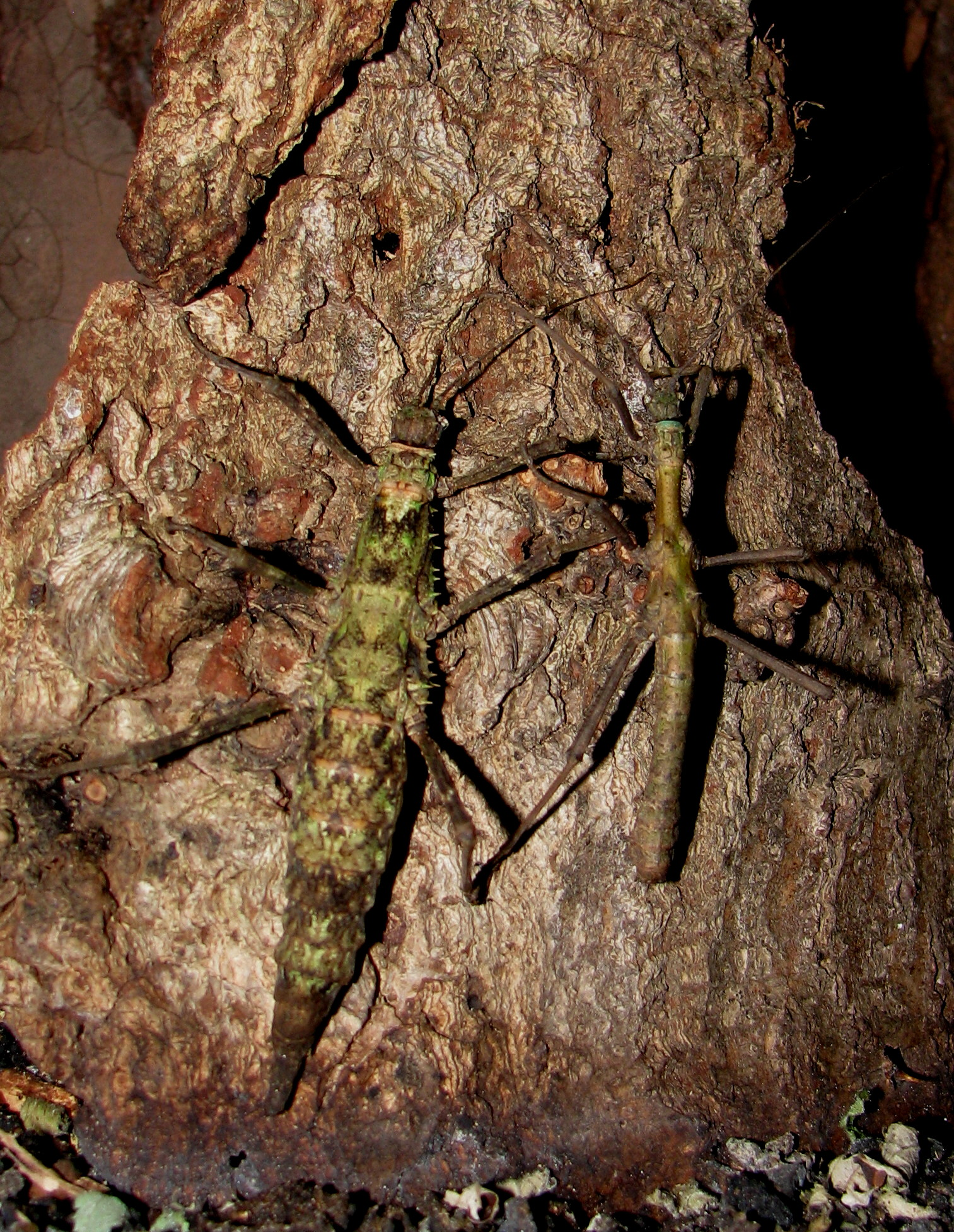
Brasidas samarensis

Brasidas is a genus of stick insects that is native to the Philippines and is named after the Spartan general Brasidas

== Characteristics ==
The representatives of this genus correspond in the habitus typical representatives of the Obrimini and are similar in appearance to Obrimus species. A pair of very conspicuous holes or pits in the metasternum is characteristic of this genus. Similar indentations can otherwise only be found in the representatives of the genus Euobrimus. The males of the previously known species are about 4.5 to 72 centimetres (1.8 to 28.3 in) in length, and are significantly smaller than the approximately 7.2 to 12.0 centimetres (2.8 to 4.7 in) long females. In egg-laying adult females, the abdomen in the middle is clearly thickened in height and width. A secondary ovipositor at the end of the abdomen surrounds the actual ovipositor. It is ventral formed from the eighth sternite, here named subgenital plate or operculum and dorsally from the eleventh tergum, which is referred to here as the supraanal plate or epiproct.

== Distribution area ==
The distribution area of the genus extends to the islands Samar, Luzon, Mindanao, Leyte, Siargao and Rapu-Rapu. In Mindanao, representatives of the genus occur in all provinces of the island. On Luzon, the genus is found in the provinces Aurora, Albay and Sorsogon and here, for example. at Mount Pulog (not to be confused with Mount Pulag located in the north of Luzon), as well as on the offshore island of Rapu-Rapu. In Samar, species occur in the provinces Eastern Visayas and Samar.

== Way of life and reproduction ==
The eggs are laid in the ground by the females with the ovipositor. Typical of the eggs, which are usually 4 to 6 millimetres (0.16 to 0.24 in) long and 2 to 3 millimetres (0.079 to 0.118 in) wide, is the bulging dorsal area and the sloping lid (operculum). Because of this construction, Brasidas eggs have a clearly recognizable opercular angle.

== Taxonomy ==
- - - Obrimus bicolanus
    - Obrimus bufo
  - - Brasidas bakeri*
    - - - Brasidas samarensis
        - Brasidas cavernosus*
          = Brasidas sp. 1 (Mt. Pulog)
          = Brasidas sp. 2 (Rapu-Rapu)
      - - Brasidas sp. 7 (Camiguin)
        - Brasidas lacerta*
          = Brasidas sp. 1 (Mt. Parker)
          = Brasidas sp. 2 (Taal Falls)
          = Brasidas sp. 3 (Frankfort)
          = Brasidas sp. 4 (Mt. Hamiguitan)
          = Brasidas sp. 5 (Impulatao)
          = Brasidas sp. 6 (Mt. Apo)
          = Euobrimus dohrni

Relationship of the Obrimus, Euobrimus and Brasidas species examined so far according to Bank et al (2021), *names changed according to Hennemann (2023)

In 1939, James Abram Garfield Rehn and his son John William Holman Rehn published an extensive work in which, among other things, they established the genus Brasidas. In this they placed two already known species, which until then had been counted in the genus Obrimus. They also described four new Brasidas species and one new subspecies. The newly described species Brasidas samarensis was established as type species. The description of Brasidas acanthoderus was made on a female nymph. In the same work, Rehn and Rehn described the genus Euobrimus, whose type species Euobrimus atherura was established. A common autapomorphic feature of both genera are the metasternal holes, which, according to Rehn and Rehn, differ in their shape and expression. While in Euobrimus they are said to be completely rimmed (literally “cingulate”), in Brasidas they are described as semi-rimmed (literally “semi-cingulate”).

As early as 2004, Oliver Zompro mentioned the need to carry out studies at the species level in order to clarify the status of the genus Euobrimus and Brasidas. Also Frank H. Hennemann et al. point out in 2016 that both genera are probably synonym to each other. This assumption was confirmed by Sarah Bank et al. research published in 2021 based on genetic analysis to clarify the phylogeny of the Heteropterygidae. Although the examined Euobrimus and Brasidas species were found in a common clade, there are no separate clades that would justify the existence of two genera. Obrimus was identified as sister genus to Euobrimus and Brasidas. Hennemann synonymized Euobrimus with Brasidas in 2023, described four new species, synonymized some of the species previously listed as Brasidas or Euobrimus and transferred one species (Obrimus quadratipes) to the genus in which it was originally described. He also showed that, among others, Bank et al. species listed as Brasidas foveolatus belong to Brasidas lacerta.

The species described so far are:

- Brasidas bakeri (Rehn, J.A.G. & Rehn, J.W.H., 1939)
  Syn. = Euobrimus hoplites Rehn, J.A.G. & Rehn, J.W.H., 1939
- Brasidas cavernosus (Stål, 1877)
- Brasidas foveolatus (Redtenbacher, 1906)
- Brasidas lacerta (Redtenbacher, 1906)
  Syn. = Brasidas acanthoderus Rehn, J.A.G. & Rehn, J.W.H., 1939
  Syn. = Euobrimus atherura Rehn, J.A.G. & Rehn, J.W.H., 1939
  Syn. = Euobrimus cleggi Rehn, J.A.G. & Rehn, J.W.H., 1939
  Syn. = Euobrimus dohrni Rehn, J.A.G. & Rehn, J.W.H., 1939
  Syn. = Brasidas foveolatus asper Rehn, J.A.G. & Rehn, J.W.H., 1939
  Syn. = Brasidas montivagus Rehn, J.A.G. & Rehn, J.W.H., 1939
  Syn. = Euobrimus stephenreyesi Lit & Eusebio, 2006
- Brasidas malaki Hennemann, 2023
- Brasidas manobo Hennemann, 2023
- Brasidas rehni Hennemann, 2023
- Brasidas samarensis Rehn, J.A.G. & Rehn, J.W.H., 1939
- Brasidas viscayanus Rehn, J.A.G. & Rehn, J.W.H., 1939
- Brasidas waray Hennemann, 2023

== Terraristic ==
The genus is present through several representatives in the terrariums of enthusiasts. The first species to be introduced in 2002 was Brasidas samarensis, which is listed by the Phasmid Study Group under PSG number 235, but is apparently no longer in breeding.

In 2008, a species from Mount Apo on the island of Mindanao was imported under the name Brasidas foveolatus, which was identified by Hennemann in 2023 as Brasidas lacerta. The breeding stock that is most widespread in terrariums must be correctly called Brasidas lacerta 'Mt. Apo'. It is listed in the PSG list under the number 301 and until 2024 under the name Brasidas foveolatus foveolatus. Additional specimens were later imported (around 2010) from the neighboring province where this breeding line was found, more precisely from the vicinity of Nabunturan. They were initially called Brasidas sp. 'Nabunturan' after their location and also belong to Brasidas lacerta. The same applies to specimens collected in October 2012 by Francis Seow-Choen and Ian Abercrombie near Valencia in the province of Bukidnon. According to where it was found, it was named Brasidas sp. 'Bukidnon'.

In October 2011, Thierry Heitzmann, who lives in the Philippines, collected four pairs of another species on the island of Rapu-Rapu. The very large animals were initially named Brasidas sp. 'Rapu-Rapu'. After three of the four pairs died, the fourth female laid enough eggs to be able to send some to Europe. In 2012, the Swiss Philipp Heller managed to hatch some specimens from these, successfully raise them and pass them on. According to Sarah Bank et al. and Hennemann it is Brasidas cavernosus. Even before the summer of 2011, Heitzmann also collected on Luzon in the province of Sorsogon on Mount Pulog animals that are now also classified as Brasidas cavernosus. The resulting strain, which was temporarily in breeding, was initially named Euobrimus lacerta ('Mt. Pulog'). While the first-mentioned strain received the PSG number 362 from the Phasmid Study Group and was called Brasidas sp. 'Rapu-Rapu' until 2024, the other strain was given the PSG number 377 and was referred to there as Euobrimus lacerta until 2024.

== Gallery ==
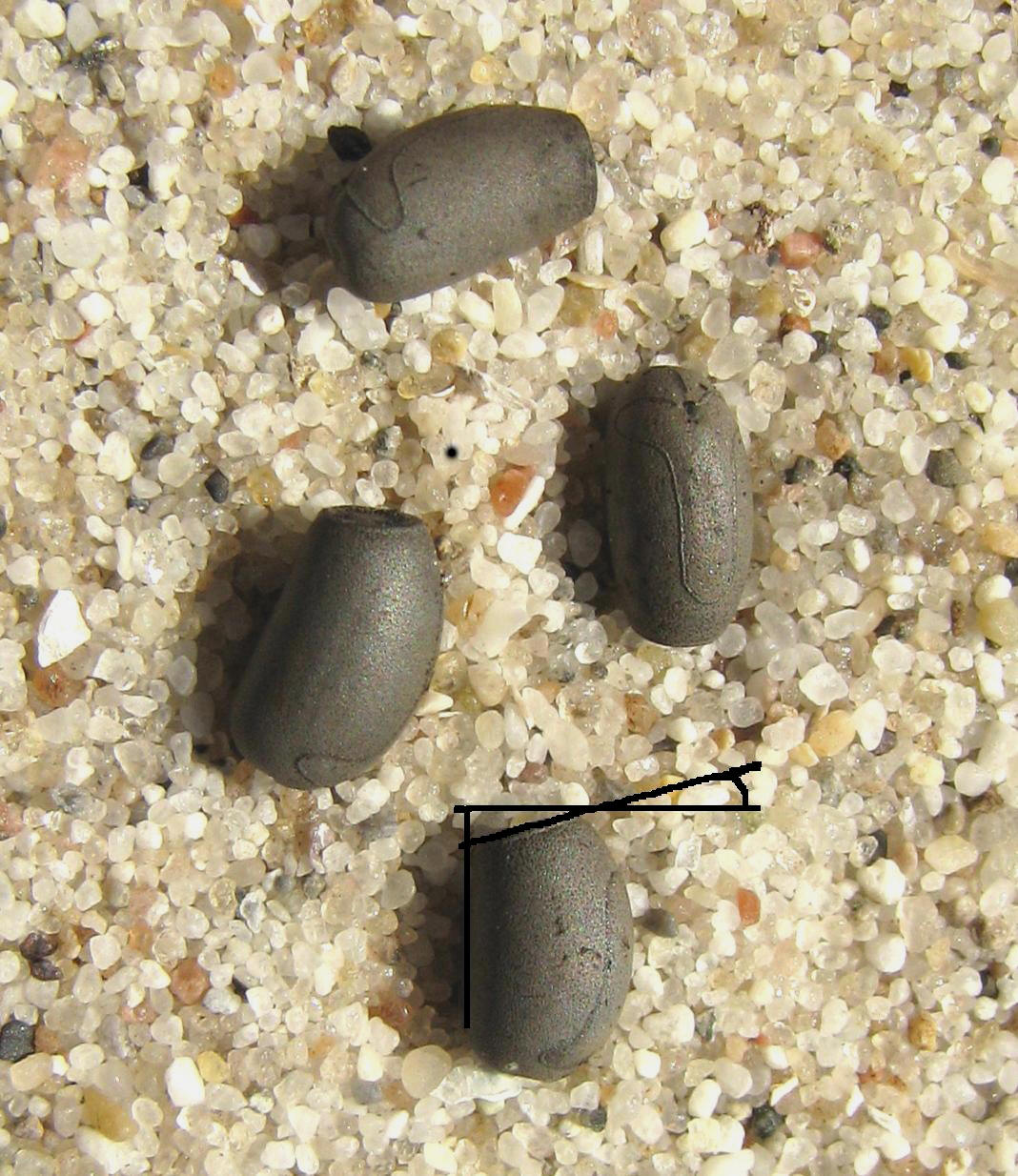
Brasidas samarensis, eggs

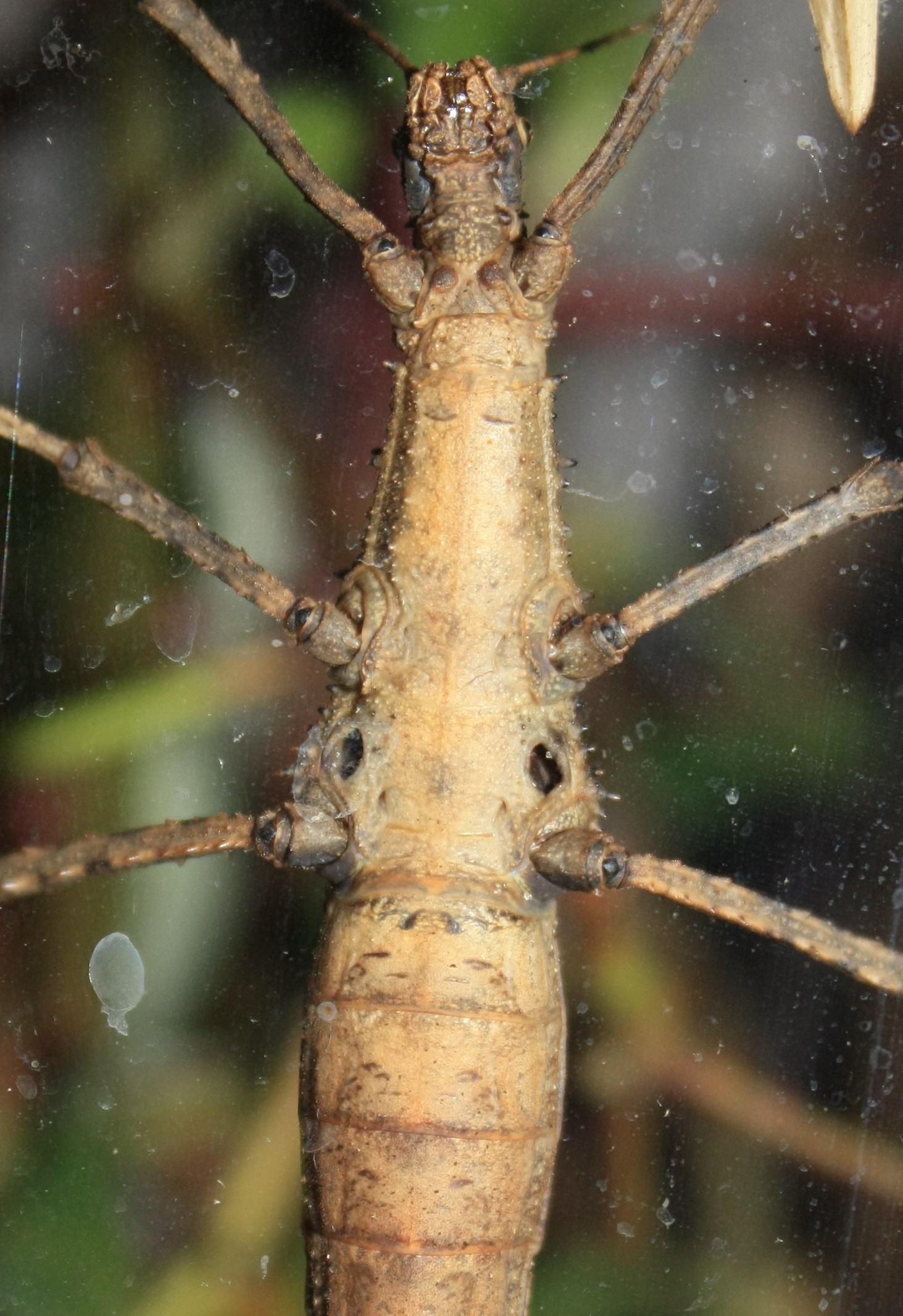
Brasidas lacerta, ventral view of a female

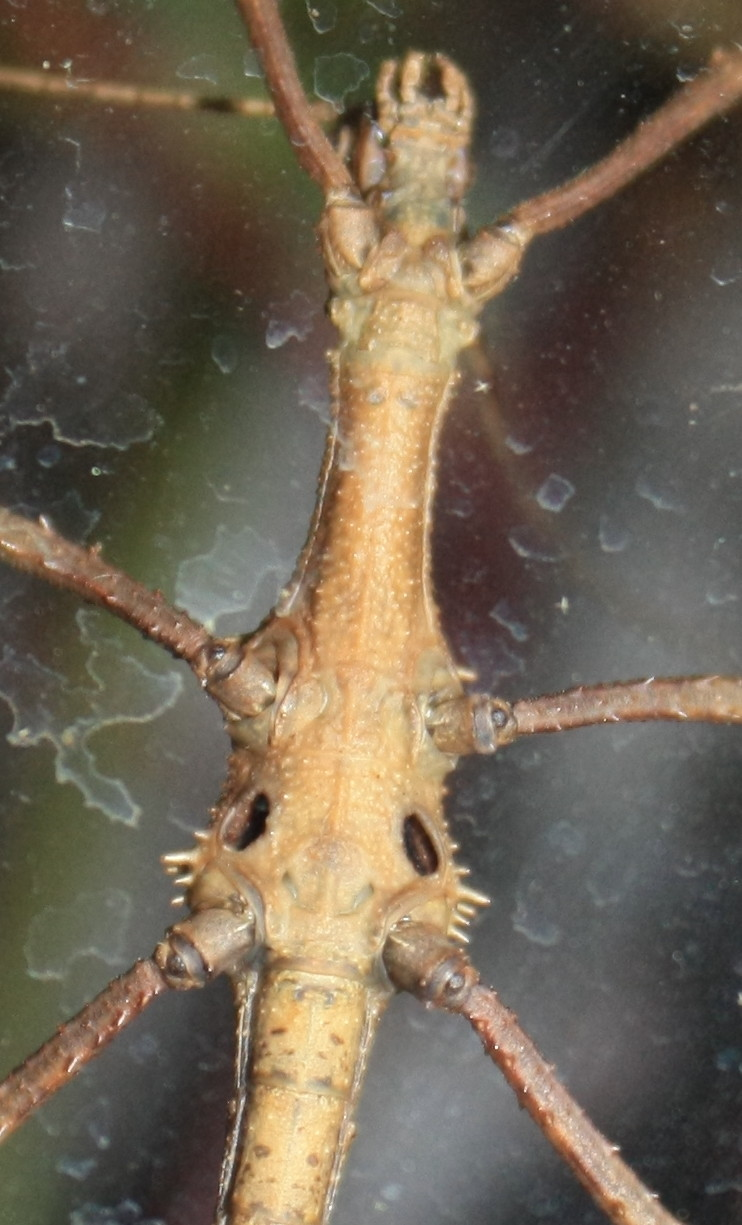
Brasidas lacerta, ventral view of a male

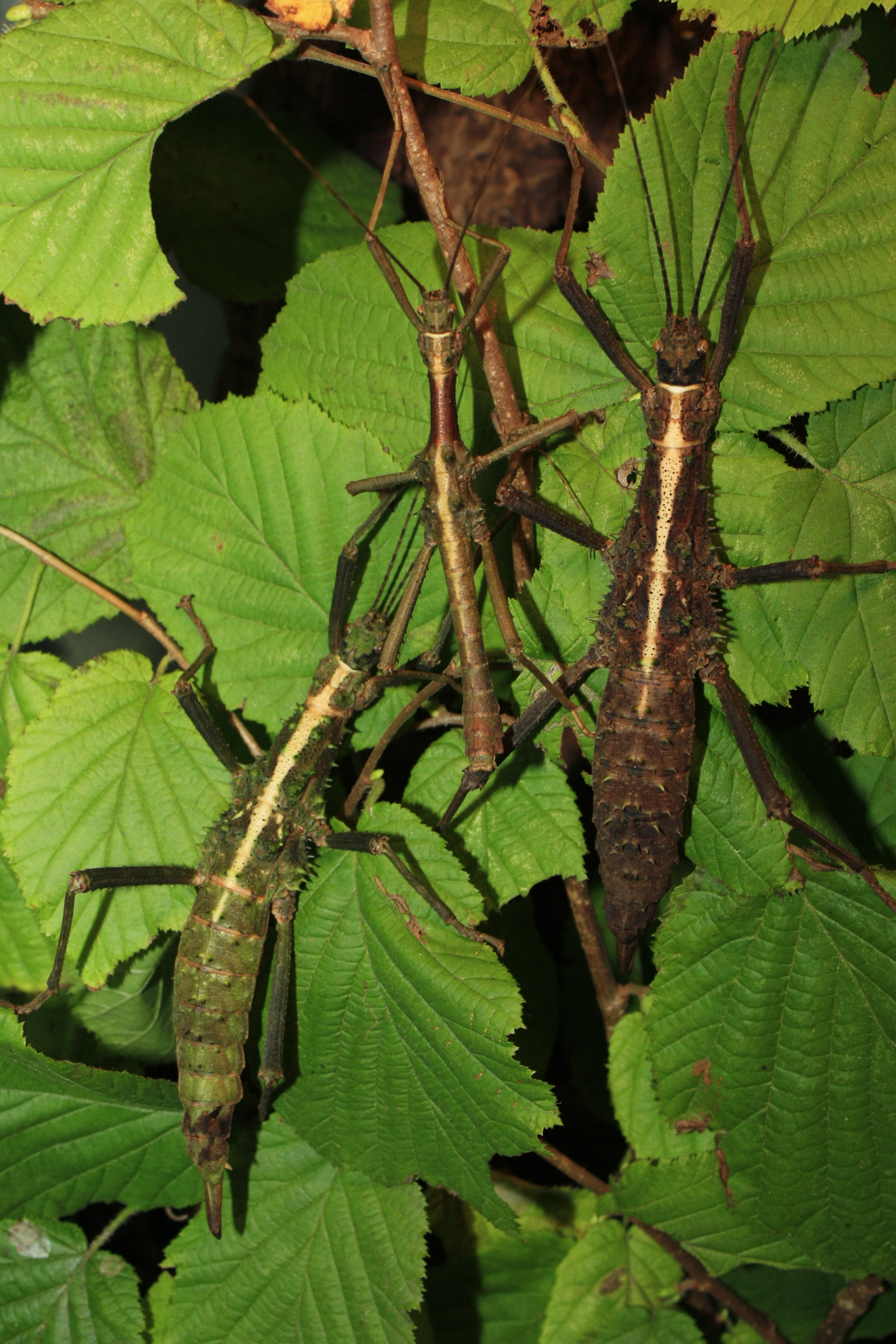
♀♀ and ♂ of Brasidas cavernosus, first named as Brasidas sp. 'Rapu-Rapu
