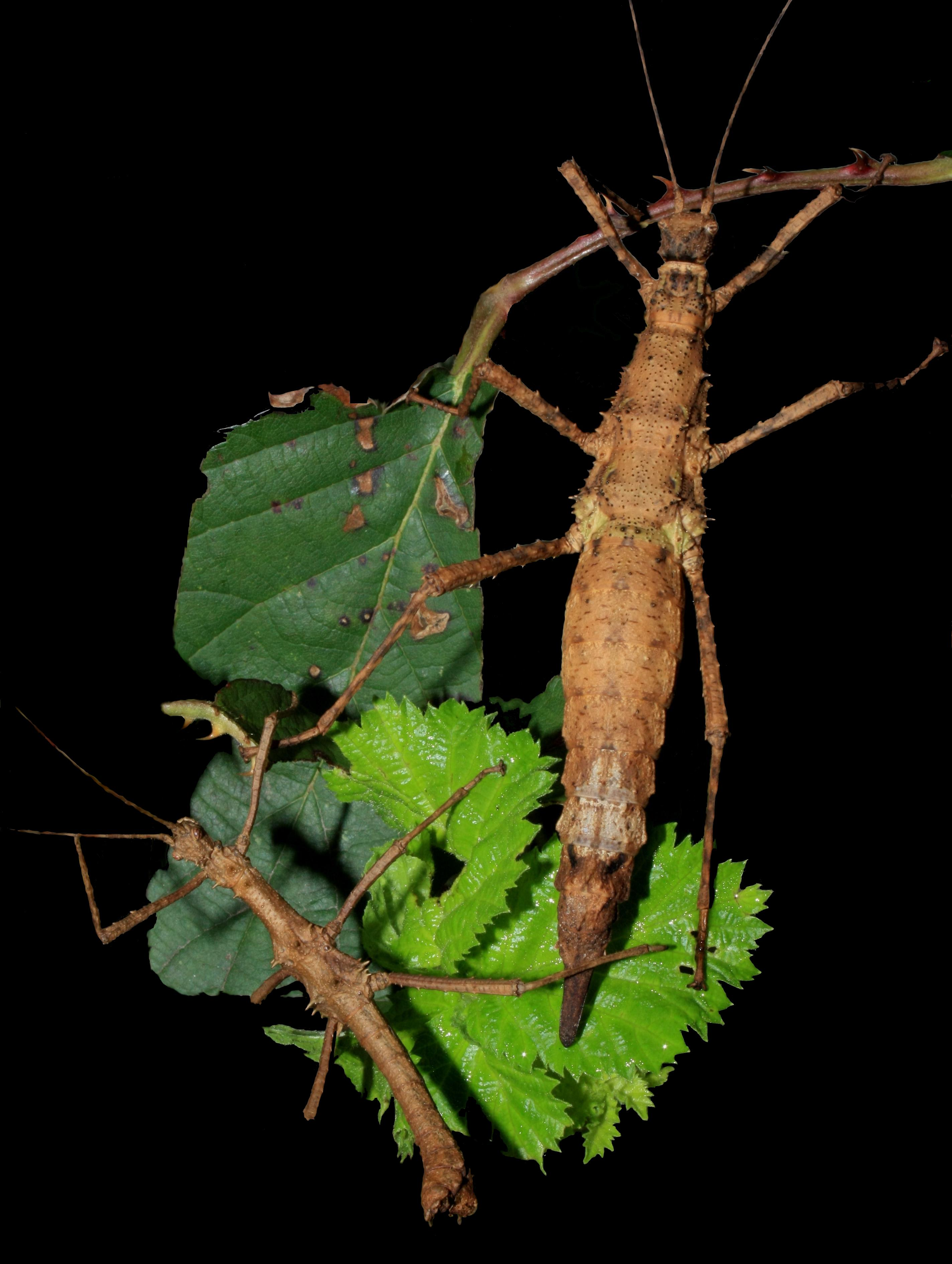
- Brasidas lacerta, pair

Scientific classification
- Kingdom: Animalia
- Phylum: Arthropoda
- Clade: Pancrustacea
- Class: Insecta
- Order: Phasmatodea
- Family: Heteropterygidae
- Subfamily: Obriminae
- Tribe: Obrimini
- Genus: Brasidas
- Species: B. lacerta

Binomial name
- Brasidas lacerta (Redtenbacher, 1906)

Synonyms
- List: Brasidas acanthoderus Rehn, J.A.G. & Rehn, J.W.H., 1939; Euobrimus atherura Rehn, J.A.G. & Rehn, J.W.H., 1939; Euobrimus cleggi Rehn, J.A.G. & Rehn, J.W.H., 1939; Euobrimus dohrni Rehn, J.A.G. & Rehn, J.W.H., 1939; Brasidas foveolatus asper Rehn, J.A.G. & Rehn, J.W.H., 1939; Brasidas montivagus Rehn, J.A.G. & Rehn, J.W.H., 1939; Euobrimus stephenreyesi Lit & Eusebio, 2006

= Brasidas lacerta =

Species of stick insect

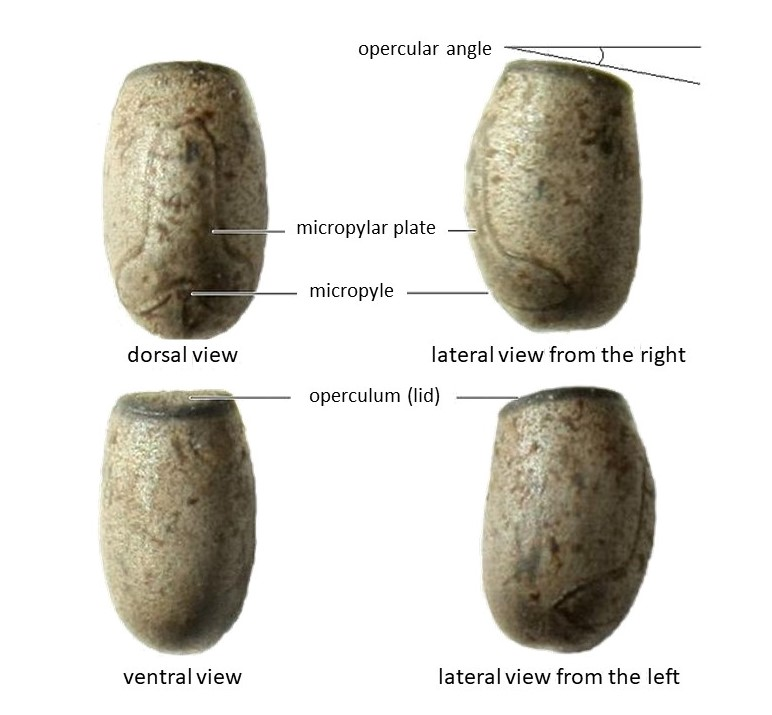
Eggs, from various viewpoints

Brasidas lacerta is a species of stick insect in the family Heteropterygidae which is endemic to Mindanao. Due to its extreme variability, and the nymphs being spinier than to the adults, the species has been described under other names, resulting in a total of seven synonyms.

== Description ==
In terms of habit, the species corresponds to typical representatives of the Obrimini. All representatives of the genus Brasidas have a pair of characteristic holes in the metasternum. These metasternal pits are deep and usually completely bordered.

At around 80 to 95 millimetres (3.1 to 3.7 in) long, the females are significantly larger and more plump than the approx. 48 to 57 millimetres (1.9 to 2.2 in) long males. Both sexes are dominated by brown and, more rarely, olive-brown tones. The more vividly marked and variable females can show bright, mostly greenish, areas particularly on the lateral and rear edge of the metanotum. Furthermore, numerous black tubercles on the head and thorax stand out clearly from the brown base color. Often, there is also a whitish area that extends from the middle of the sixth to almost the entire width of the seventh segment of the abdomen. There is almost always a pair of black spots on the eighth segment. Due to this color combination, the end of the abdomen, together with the ovipositor, is reminiscent of a head, more precisely a bird's head. Occasionally females occur with a wide, white, longitudinal band over the entire body on a brown background, complemented by the black spots on the eighth abdominal segment. At the end of the abdomen is the ovipositor, which is typical for all Obriminae and is long and straight.

Like females, adult males are less spined than nymphs. They are less variably colored. Shades of brown usually dominate on the males, and where the females have white or beige markings, the same areas tend to be light brown on the males.

== Reproduction ==
As with all Obrimini, the 4 to 5 millimetres (0.16 to 0.20 in) long and 2 to 3 millimetres (0.079 to 0.118 in) wide eggs are laid in the ground using the laying spine (ovipositor) at the end of the abdomen. The eggshells are gray and become darker when the humidity is higher, becoming lighter again when it is dry. The dorsal area is bulging and the lid (operculum), which is always dark gray in color, sits on the egg sloping towards the ventral side, so that an opercular angle of around ten degrees is created. The nymphs hatch from the eggs after about four months and then need another four months to grow.

== Taxonomy ==
Josef Redtenbacher described this species as Obrimus lacerta in 1906 based on three specimens from Luzon and Mindanao. These came partly from the Natural History Museum, Berlin and partly from his own collection, which was later affiliated with the Natural History Museum, Vienna. He does not specify the origin of each specimen. The chosen species name, lacerta, is borrowed from Latin and means "lizard" (see also genus of lizards Lacerta). At the end of the species description he mentions that he is not sure whether the two males and the female belong to the same species. In the same work he also published a section on Obrimus cavernosus (today named Brasidas cavernosus, described in 1877 by Carl Stål on the basis of a female). Here too, three animals were examined, specifically one male and two females. The material from the Museum für Natural History Museum, Berlin, was collected in the island of Luzon, and that from the National Museum of Natural History in Paris was acquired in Mindanao. Here too he mentions that it is not certain whether both sexes belong to the same species and leaves open which animals come from which location. Heinrich Dohrn in 1910 doubted that the two species mentioned, Obrimus lacerta and Obrimus cavernosus, were independent species. He examined two pairs from Mindanao, whose males fit Redtenbacher's cavernosus and whose females fit his lacerta.

James Abram Garfield Rehn and his son John William Holman Rehn transferred both species to the newly created genus Euobrimus in 1938/39 and described five new species in it, including Euobrimus dohrni, which is the basis for the description of the two pairs from Mindanao mentioned by Dohrn. One of the sexes of Obrimus cavernosus and Obrimus lacerta examined by Redtenbacher is said to belong to this species. Later cataloging of the collections in Berlin and Vienna revealed that the three syntypes described by Redtenbacher are an adult male from Luzon, an adult female from Mindanao in the Berlin Museum, and a juvenile male from Luzon in the Vienna Museum. Frank H. Hennemann synonymized the genus Euobrimus with Brasidas in 2023 and clarified the status of the syntypes that belong to three different species. The juvenile male from Luzon belongs to Brasidas cavernosus, which was described before Brasidas lacerta. The adult male from Luzon from Berlin belongs to Euobrimus bakeri described by Rehn and Rehn in 1939. Since the latter was described using several adult specimens with precise collection dates, the species has been retained as Brasidas bakeri. The adult female from the Vienna collection remained as a lectotype of Brasidas lacerta.

When examining the species now completely listed in Brasidas, Hennemann found that five of the species described by Rehn and Rehn, as well as one subspecies, are synonyms of Brasidas lacerta. The type material of the synonymized Brasidas montivagus and Brasidas foveolatus asper is located in the National Museum of Natural History (USNM) in Washington, D.C. The types of Euobrimus atherura and Euobrimus cleggi named after the insect collector Charles F. Clegg can be found in the Academy of Natural Sciences of Drexel University in Philadelphia (ANSP). The juvenile holotype of Brasidas acanthoderus is located in the Museum of Comparative Zoology (MCZ) of Harvard University in Cambridge. The specimens of Euobrimus dohrni examined by Dohrn and named after him are deposited as syntypes in the Museum and Institute of Zoology of the Polish Academy of Sciences (MIZ) in Warsaw. Also deposited in the UPLB collection in 2006 are specimens named by Ireno L. Lit jr. and Orlando L. Eusebio in honor of Stephan Reyes, a taxonomic entomologist researching bees and wasps, and former director of the Museum of Natural History of the University of the Philippines Los Baños (UPLB). The specimens are described as Euobrimus stephenreyesi and are synonymous with Brasidas lacerta. Its male holotype and the juvenile female paratype are deposited in the same place.

== In terraristics ==
The first representatives of this species arrived in the terrariums of enthusiasts in March 2008. They were collected by Joachim Bresseel, Mark Bushell and Ellen Caluwé on the island of Mindanao in Nabunturan and at Lake Agko near Mount Apo. Until the end of 2023 and for some time thereafter, the breeding strain was known and distributed under the name Brasidas foveolatus. It is still listed by the Phasmid Study Group as Brasidas foveolatus foveolatus under the PSG number 301.

A breeding strain of the species, also introduced later (around 2010) from Nabunturan, was initially called Brasidas sp. 'Nabunturan' after its location and is no longer in breeding.

A stock collected in 2011 by Thierry Heitzmann on Mount Pulog in Luzon, Sorsogon Province, was initially identified as Euobrimus lacerta. This strain, listed under PSG number 377, does not belong to Brasidas lacerta, but was identified in 2021 as Euobrimus cavernosus (today Brasidas cavernosus).

Brasidas lacerta can easily be fed with leaves of bramble and other Rosaceae, as well as hazel, oak, ivy or Hypericum. Occasionally the forage plants should be sprayed with water. In order to enable eggs to be laid, the floor of the terrarium should be covered a few centimeters high with a slightly moist soil substrate.

== Gallery ==
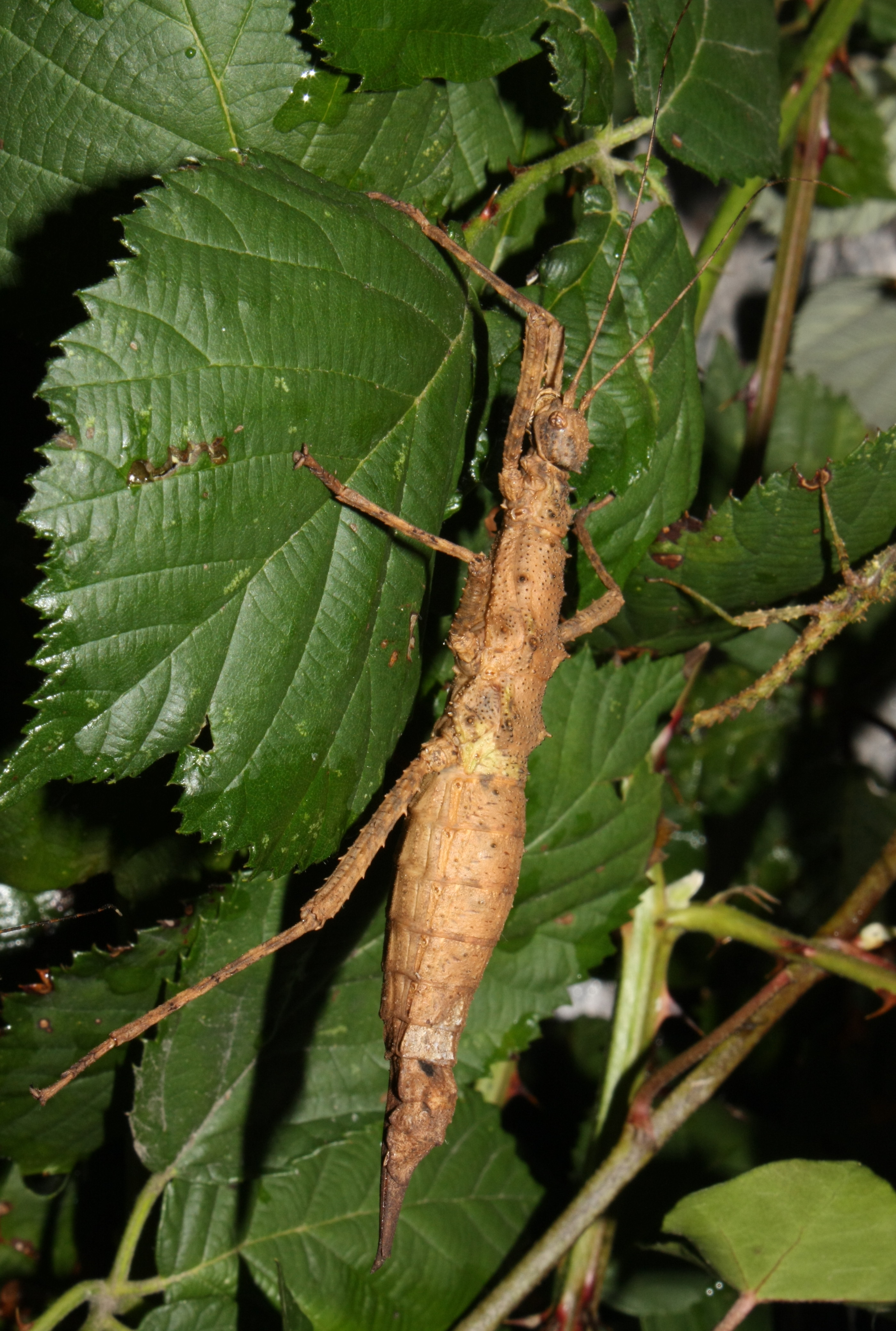
Female

Portrait of a male

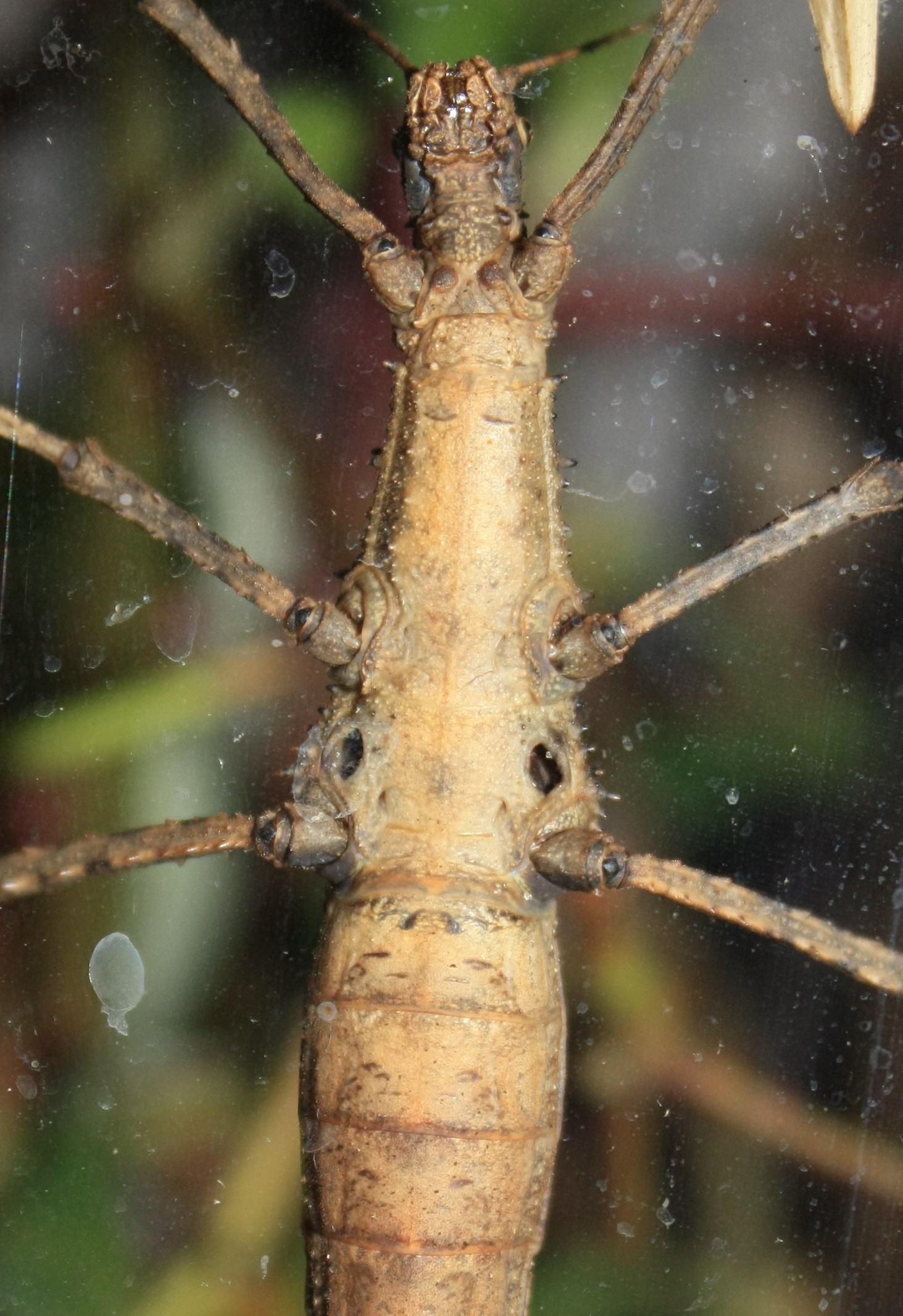
Female from ventral

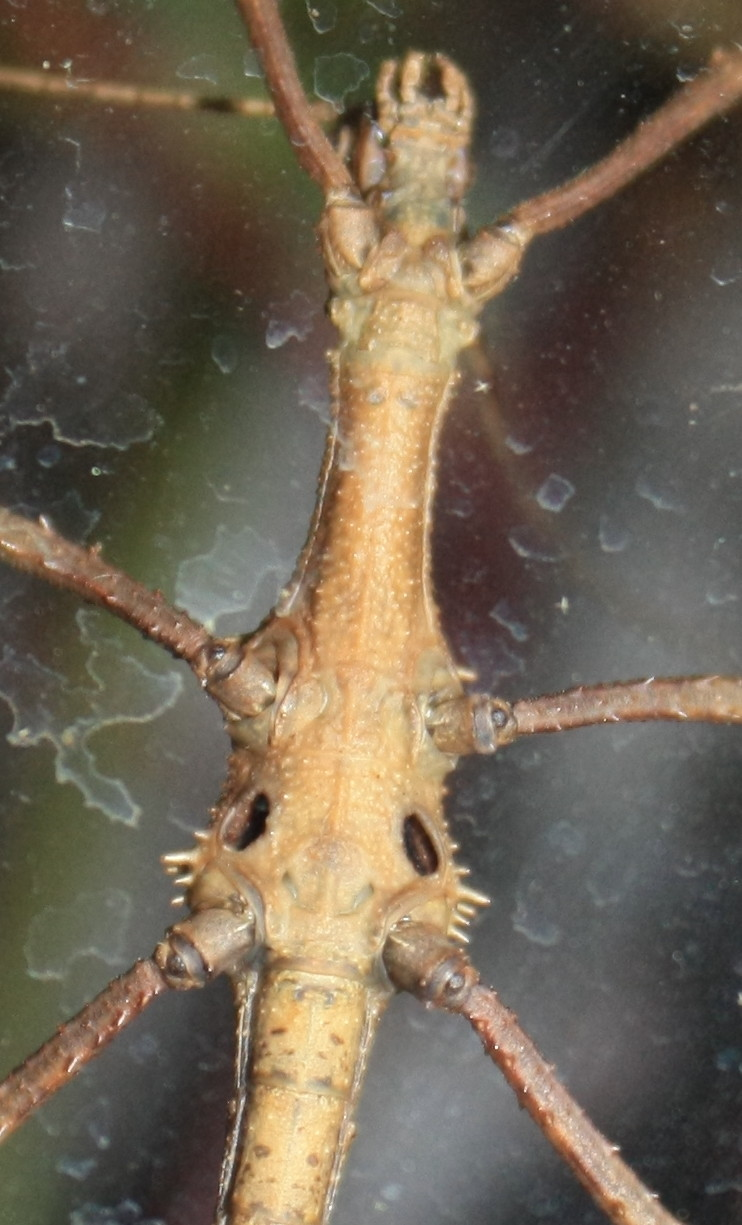
Male from ventral
