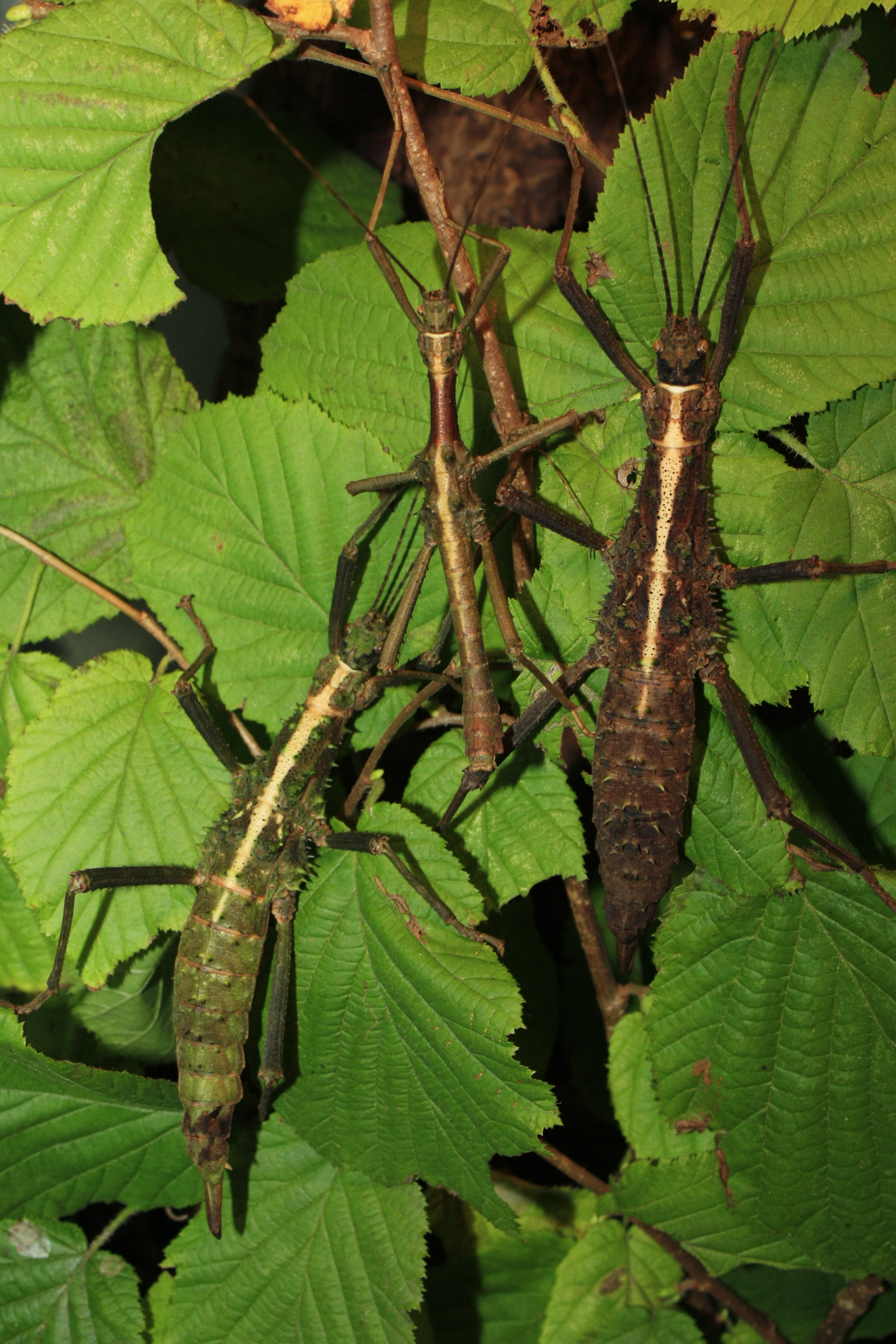
- Brasidas cavernosus from Rapu Rapu, ♀♀ and ♂

Scientific classification
- Kingdom: Animalia
- Phylum: Arthropoda
- Clade: Pancrustacea
- Class: Insecta
- Order: Phasmatodea
- Family: Heteropterygidae
- Subfamily: Obriminae
- Tribe: Obrimini
- Genus: Brasidas
- Species: B. cavernosus

Binomial name
- Brasidas cavernosus (Stål, 1877)

Synonyms
- Obrimus cavernosus Stål, 1877; Euobrimus cavernosus (Stål, 1877)

= Brasidas cavernosus =

Species of stick insect

Brasidas cavernosus is a representative of the stick insects native to the Philippine island Luzon. It is considered one of the largest species in the subfamily Obriminae.

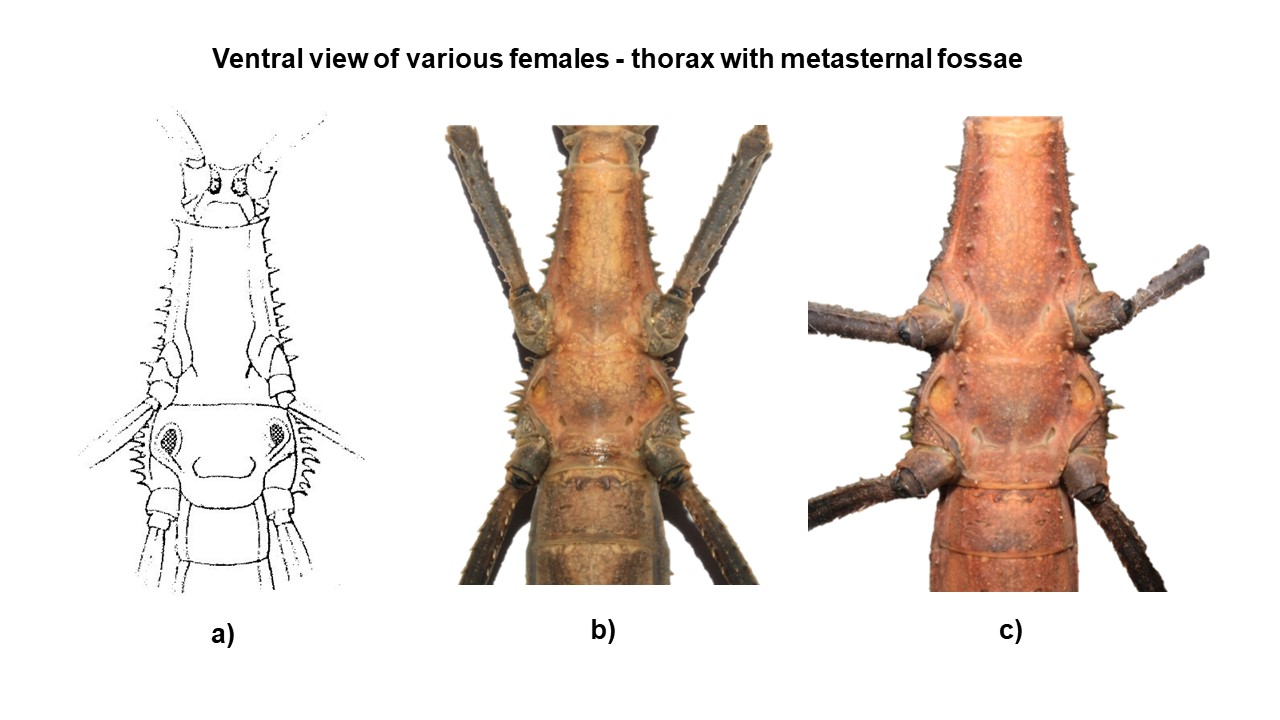
a) picture from Rethenbacher 1906, (pl. I, fig. 6); b) female from stock imported as Euobrimus lacerta coll. at Mount Pulog (PSG 377); c) female from stock imported as Brasidas sp. "Rapu Rapu" (PSG 362)

== Taxonomy ==
The species was described in 1877 by Carl Stål under the basionym Obrimus cavernosus in the genus Obrimus, which had also been set up by Stål two years earlier. He calls them closely related to Obrimus bufo and distinguishes them from the latter by the slightly different spines on the body and legs. The main difference is the lateral pits in the metasternum, which also give the species its name ("cavernousus" Latin for cave-like). In 1933, Sjöstedt mentioned the female presumably used for the first description as a holotype. It is in the Swedish Museum of Natural History in Stockholm.

Joseph Redtenbacher examined three animals in 1906, more precisely one male and two females, which he assigned to this species. The male from the Natural History Museum, Berlin was collected on Luzon, the females from the National Museum of Natural History, France in Paris were collected on Mindanao. He mentions at the end of the description that it is not certain whether both sexes belong to the same species. Redtenbacher also describes another species with metasternal pits under the name Obrimus lacerta (today Brasidas lacerta). This is smaller and, according to Redtenbacher, differs in the female gender by the larger, but flatter, four spines on the basal segments of the abdomen. In addition, Obrimus lacerta is missing the four spines on the posterior edge of these abdominal segments. Of the specimens referred to as Obrimus cavernosus by Redetenbacher, according to current knowledge, the male specimen from Mindanao belongs to an other species. This is already indicated by studies by Heinrich Dohrn, who in 1910 doubted that the Obrimus lacerta and Obrimus cavernosus described by Redtenbacher were independent species. He examined two pairs from Mindanao, whose males fit Redtenbacher's cavernosus and whose females fit his lacerta. Frank H. Hennemann clarified in 2023 that the three syntypes of Brasidas lacerta are representatives of three species, of which only the adult female from Redtenbacher's collection which is deposited at the Natural History Museum, Vienna can be attributed to Brasidas lacerta. The juvenile male from Redtenbacher's collection is Brasidas cavernosus while an adult male from Luzon from the Berlin collection belongs to the later described Euobrimus bakeri (today Brasidas bakeri).

James Abram Garfield Rehn and his son John William Holman Rehn described both the genus Brasidas and Euobrimus in 1939. They transferred both Obrimus cavernosus and Obrimus lacerta to the latter. Regarding Euobrimus cavernosus they sometimes mention confusion between Redtenbacher and Dohrn. Four of the six specimens they examined, four of which were male and two female, came from the collection of Morgan Hebard. These are deposited in the natural history museum at Drexel University in Philadelphia. The other two specimens, two males, come from the collection of what is now the National Museum of Natural History in Washington, D.C. In fact, the specimens from Hebard's collection examined by Rehn and Rehn, which come from the island Siargao off Mindanao, belong to the Brasidas rehni, which was described in 2023 by Hennemann.

In a molecular genetic study published in 2021, several species of the then genera Brasidas and Euobrimus were examined, including samples of Euobrimus cavernosus from different localities. While most of the Obrimini genera have been confirmed as monophyletic, this does not apply to Brasidas and Euobrimus. Hennemann synonymized "Euobrimus" with "Brasidas" in 2023.

== Description ==
The females of the species reach 9.6 to 11.4 centimetres (3.8 to 4.5 in) in length and are therefore among the largest representatives of the obrimini along with Trachyaretaon carmelae. Like many other species of the tribe, they are very variably colored. In addition to females with a light or dark brown base color, there are also green and mixed colored animals. The small, black tubercles, which are often typical for representatives of the genus, are particularly present in the area of the meso- and metanotum. In addition, larger areas of white or beige are often present, such as a line beginning on the pronotum and extending to the abdomen, or symmetrical areas on the metanotum. Darker or almost black patterns can also appear, especially on the abdomen. The larger spines on the head, thorax, and anterior abdomen may be dark or green in color. The abdomen ends in an ovipositor. Its ventral subgenital plate ends in a point. The dorsal part of the ovipositor, which is called the supraanal plate or epiproct, is significantly shorter than the ventral part and ends bluntly.

Males are a about 6.6 to 7.25 centimetres (2.60 to 2.85 in) long and are usually quite similar in colour. The body, which is olive green to brown on the upper side, is conspicuously reddish brown in the area of the mesonotum. The beige to yellowish longitudinal line from the pronotum to the front abdomen, which also occurs in some females, is always more or less clearly present. The males have significantly fewer spines than the females. In addition to three pairs of spines on the head, there is only one larger pair of spines in the rear area of the pro-, meso- and metanotum. In addition, a larger pair of mesopleurals and several metapleural spines are formed.

== Distribution area and reproduction ==
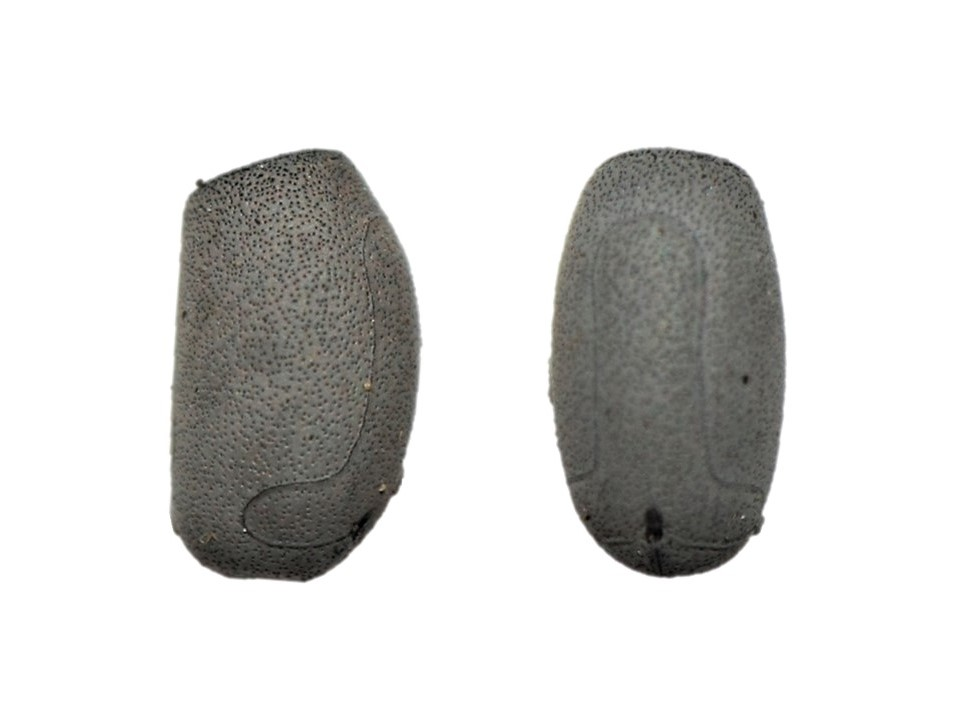
Eggs of Brasidas cavernosus native to Rapu Rapu (PSG No. 362)

While Stål only states that the distribution area is the Philippines, it is now certain that the mention of Mindanao by Redtenbacher refers to Brasidas lacerta and the island Siargao off the coast of Mindanao by Rehn and Rehn refer to Brasidas rehni. The representatives of the species examined by Sarah Bank are exclusively animals from Luzon, more precisely from the southeastern province of Sorsogon from Mount Pulog (not to be confused with Mount Pulag located in the north of Luzon), as well as from the offshore island Rapu Rapu in the province of Albay. Hennemann also names locations on Luzon in the provinces Aurora and Leyte.

The kidney-shaped, grey-brown eggs laid by the females using the ovipositor are 6.1 millimetres (0.24 in) long and 3.3 millimetres (0.13 in) wide. Their operculum (cover) is flat and sits slightly obliquely on the egg. The nymphs that hatch from the eggs are about 15 millimetres (0.59 in) long and light brown.

== In terraristics ==
In October 2011, the Frenchman Thierry Heitzmann, who lives in the Philippines, collected four pairs of this species on the island of Rapu-Rapu. The very large animals were initially classified as Brasidas sp. 'Rapu-Rapu'. After the animals did not eat well and three of the four pairs died, the fourth female laid enough eggs to be able to send some to Europe. In 2012, the Swiss Philipp Heller managed to hatch some animals, raise them successfully and pass them on. The species received the PSG number 362 from the Phasmid Study Group and is still known there as Brasidas sp. 'Rapu-Rapu'.

Another stock was also collected by Heitzmann on Luzon in the province of Sorsogon at Mount Pulog before the summer of 2011. From the animals identified as Euobrimus lacerta, he sent some eggs to the Dutchman Rob Krijns, who successfully bred them and distributed the offspring in Europe. The resulting breeding line is listed by the Phasmid Study Group under the PSG number 377 and the name Euobrimus lacerta used by Heitzmann. According to the recent study by Bank et al. and Hennemann, this stock is also Brasidas cavernosus.

Keeping the stocks currently being bred is uncomplicated. Unlike Heitzmann's original animals of Rapu Rapu, they readily eat a variety of forage plants. Hazel, salal, Araceae, bramble and other Rosaceae are suitable as food for all stages.

== Gallery ==
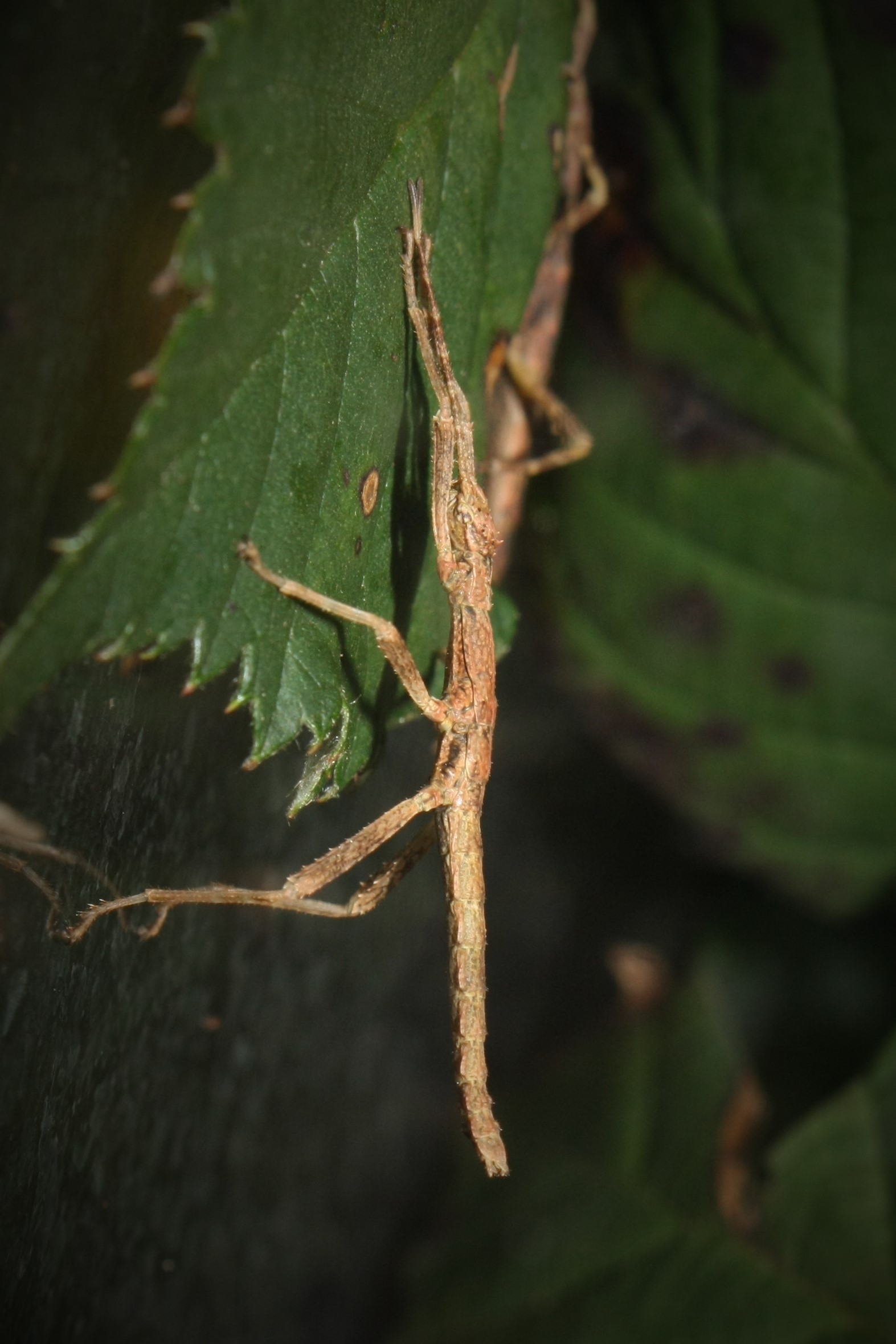
nymph of stock first named Euobrimus lacerta (PSG 377)

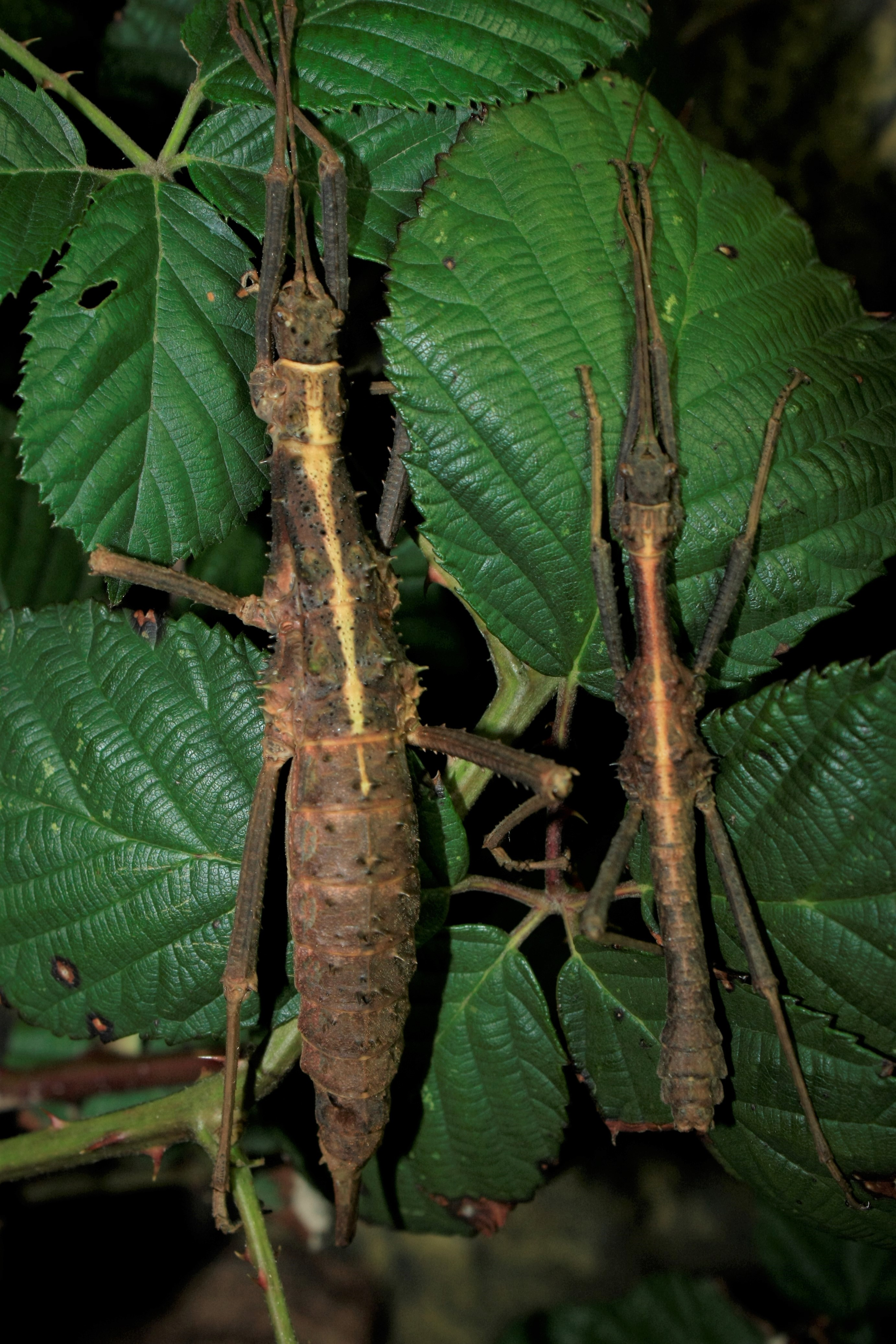
pair of stock first named Euobrimus lacerta (PSG 377)

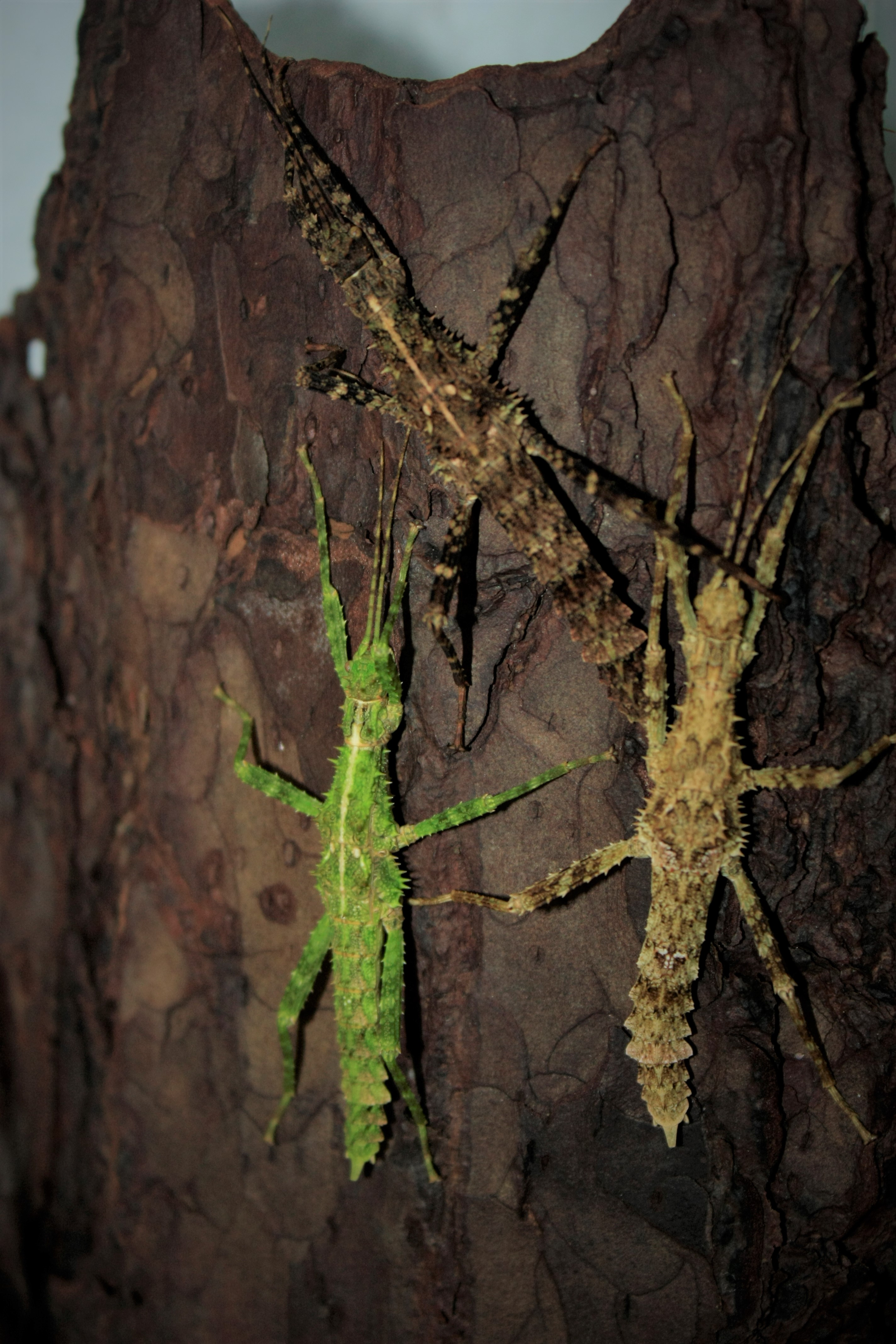
differently colored female nymphs from the Rapu-Rapu stock (PSG 362)

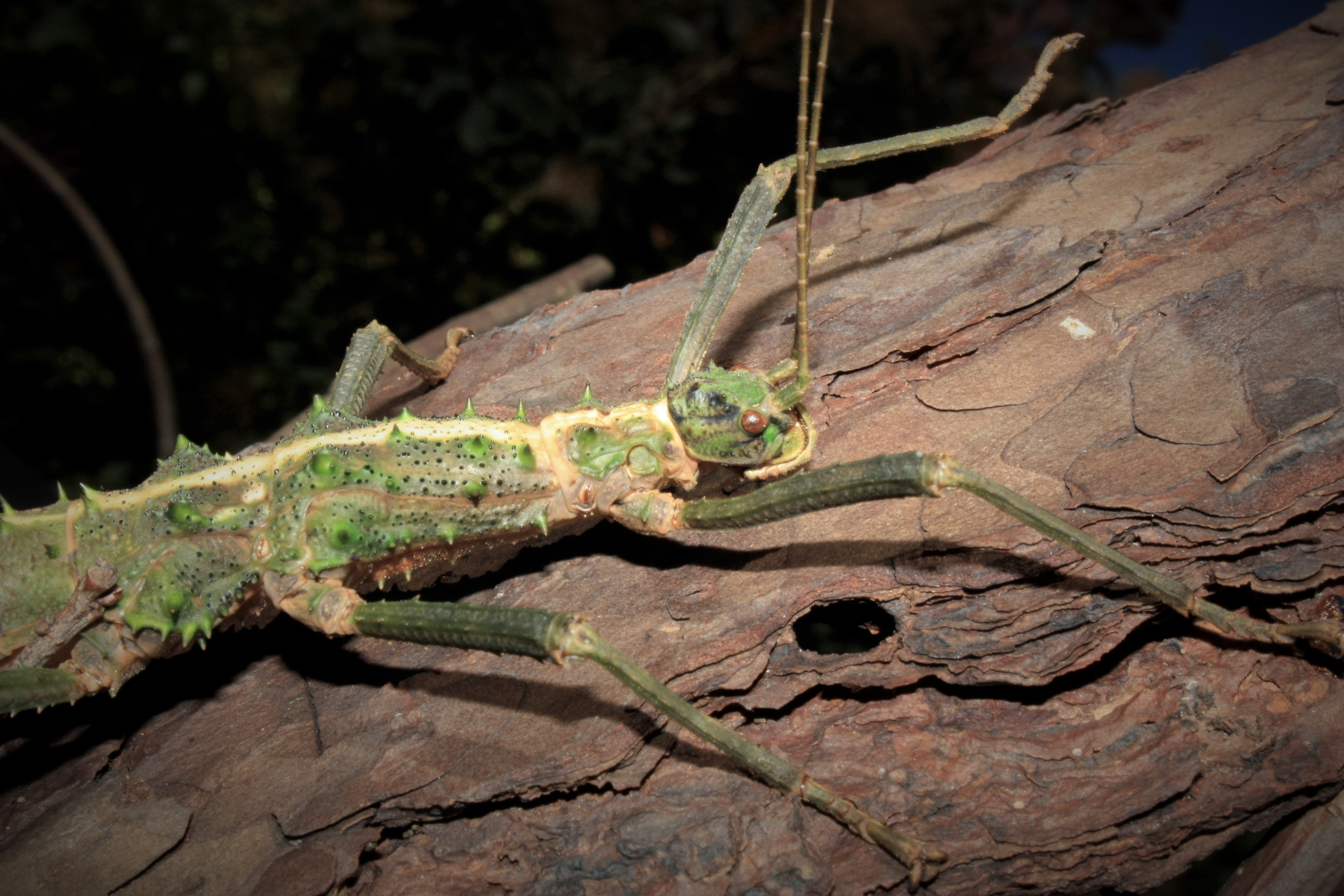
portrait of a female from the Rapu-Rapu stock (PSG 362)

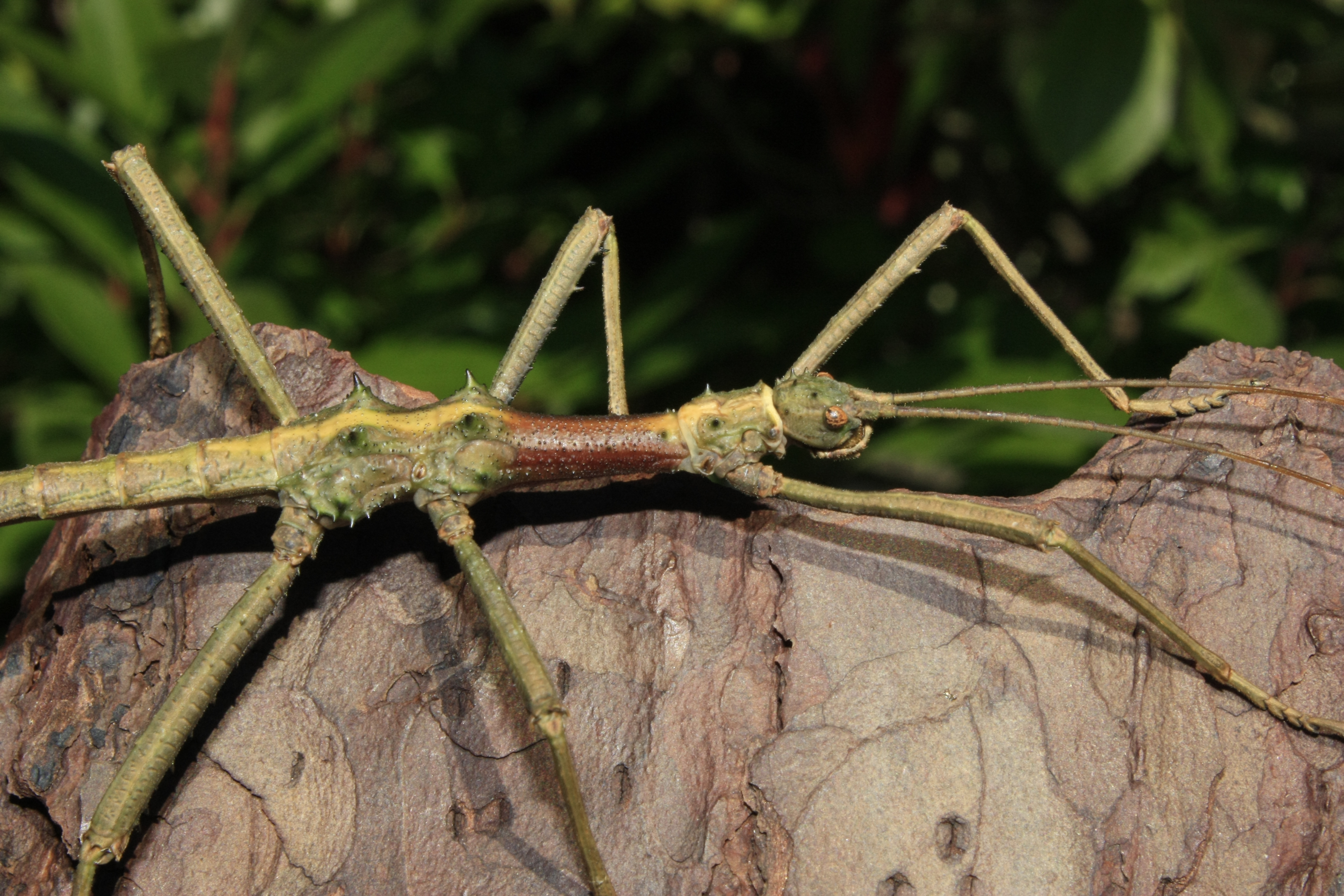
portrait of a female from the Rapu-Rapu stock (PSG 362)
