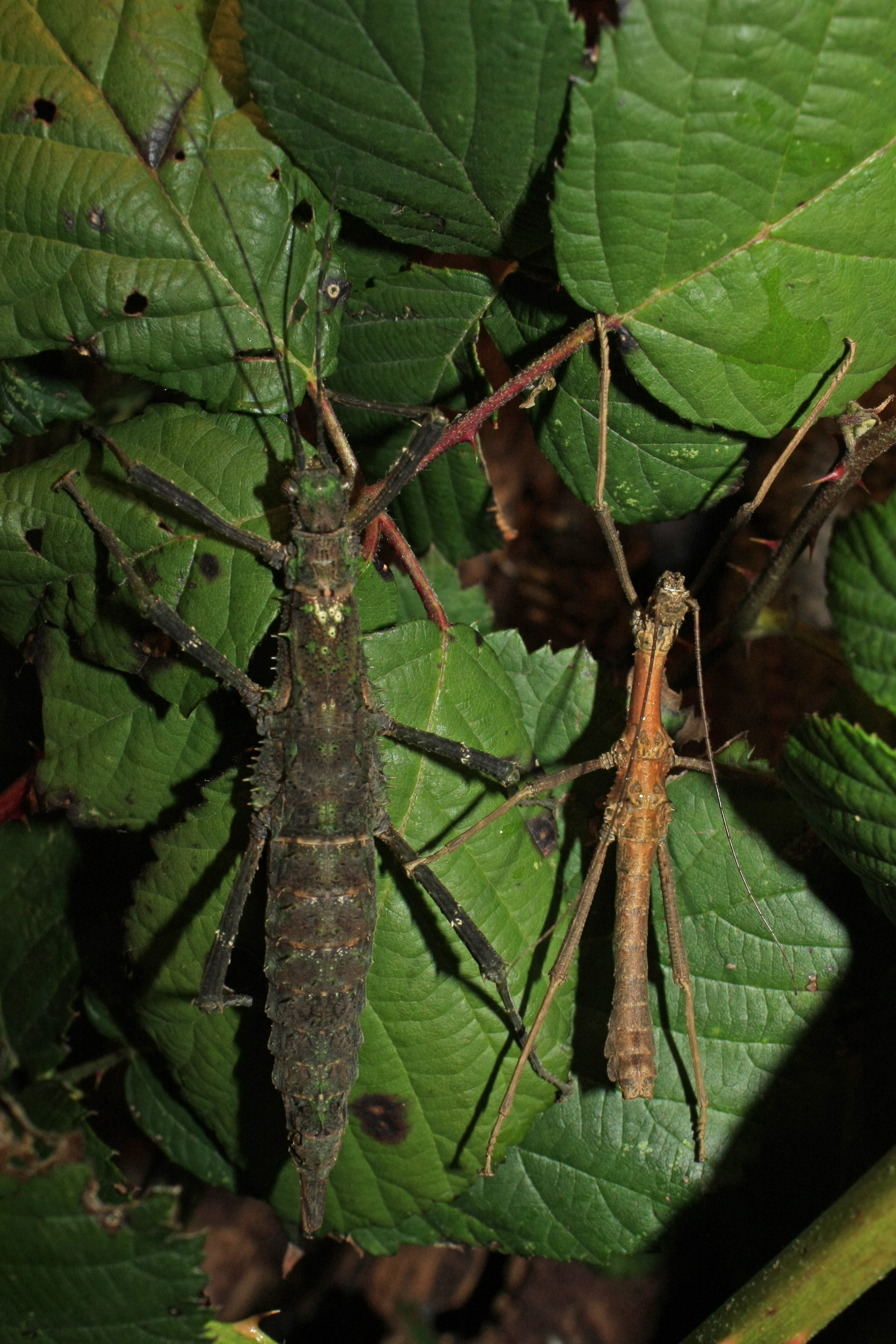
- Brasidas samarensis, pair

Scientific classification
- Kingdom: Animalia
- Phylum: Arthropoda
- Clade: Pancrustacea
- Class: Insecta
- Order: Phasmatodea
- Family: Heteropterygidae
- Subfamily: Obriminae
- Tribe: Obrimini
- Genus: Brasidas
- Species: B. samarensis

Binomial name
- Brasidas samarensis Rehn, J.A.G. & Rehn, J.W.H., 1939

= Brasidas samarensis =

Species of stick insect

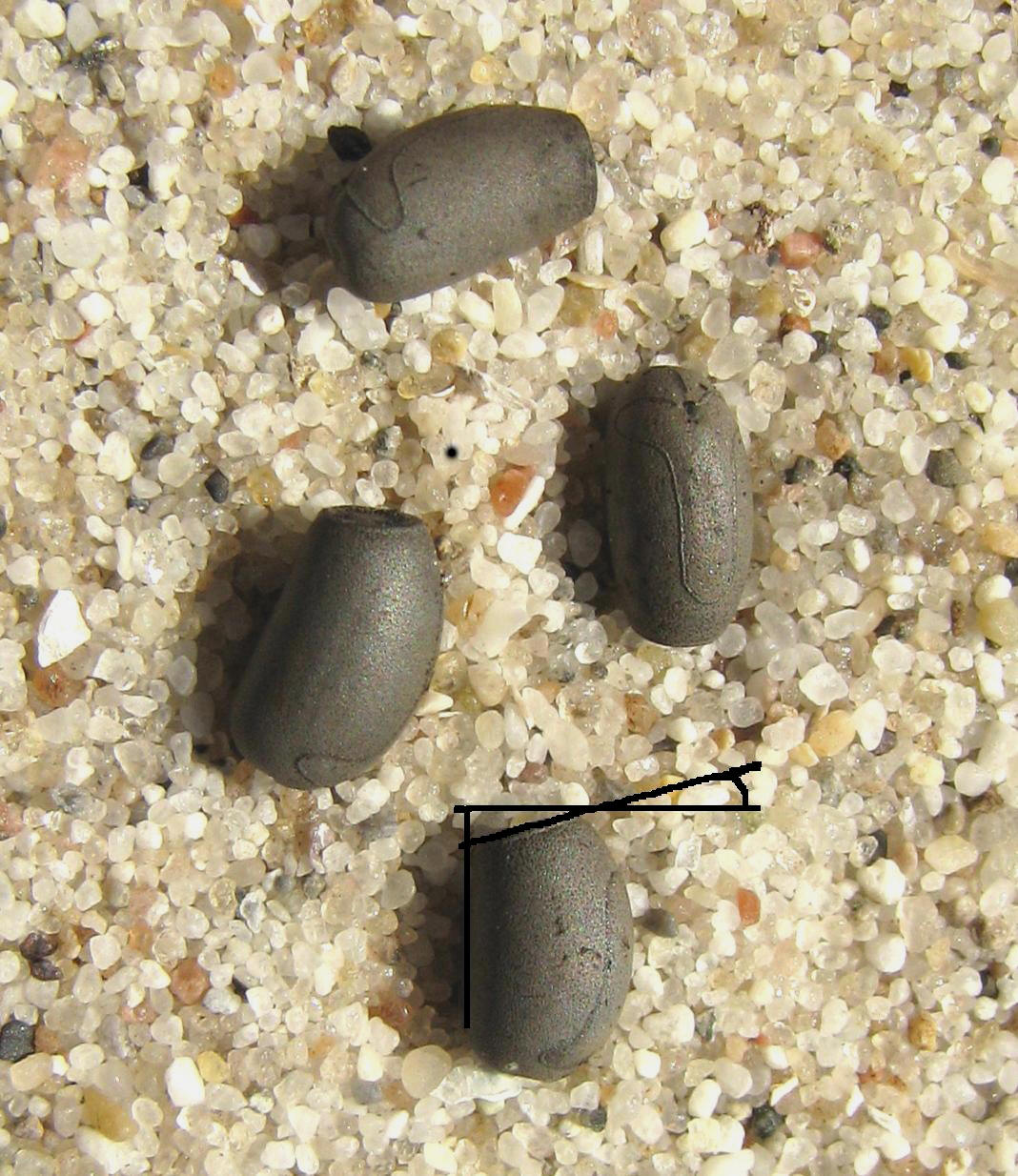
Eggs (lower one with marked opercular angle)

Brasidas samarensis is stick insect species from the family Heteropterygidae. Occasionally it is named Samar stick insect according to their origin. In addition is the type species of the genus Brasidas, which was named after the Spartan officer Brasidas.

== Taxonomy ==
James Abram Garfield Rehn and his son John William Holman Rehn described the species in 1939 as type species of the genus described in the same work. In the National Museum of Natural History in Washington, DC a male holotype, a female allotype and another adult couple and three nymphs are stored as paratypes.

== Description ==
The females of Brasidas samarensis are about 100 to 110 millimetres (3.9 to 4.3 in) larger and wider than the approx. 55 to 70 millimetres (2.2 to 2.8 in) long males. They are very individually colored, with mostly brown colors dominating, which are often interrupted by green areas. In the more vividly drawn nymphs the green areas still take up large parts of the body. The male nymphs are also mostly green with a few brown areas. The adult males are only slightly prickly and often almost completely brown in color. Only the head is usually pale green and often has an intense green spot on the forehead. In the habitus both sexes correspond to the representatives of the Obrimini such as Trachyaretaon or Sungaya species. As with all representatives of the genus Brasidas, this species also has a pair of characteristic holes in the metasternum.

== Distribution area and way of life ==
The occurrence of Brasidas samarensis is known so far limited to the Philippine island Samar, to which the specific epithet refers.

Forage plants are guavas and various other species. To lay eggs, the females drill the secondary ovipositor at the end of the abdomen, which surrounds the actual ovipositor, into the ground and lay the eggs there. These are around 4 to 5 millimetres (0.16 to 0.20 in) long and 2 to 3 millimetres (0.079 to 0.118 in) wide. Their gray color changes to dark brown with highrt humidity or contact with water. After drying, they are gray again. In the lateral view the ventral edge appears straight, while the dorsal area is bulbous. The resulting opercular angle from the lid (operculum) to the ventral edge is 10 to 12 degrees. The nymphs hatch from the eggs after about four to five months, even if there is less moisture. After another six months they are adult and can then live for up to a year.

== In terraristics ==
The first breeding stocks present in the enthusiasts' terrariums dates back to 2002 in specimens collected in Bobon. The species is listed under PSG number 235 by the Phasmid Study Group. This stock, and thus the species, is no longer in breeding that is widely known. Brasidas samarensis is not so easy to keep. It can be kept at room temperature and is easy to feed all year round with bramble or other Rosaceae. Alternatively, leaves of oaks, Crataegus species or hazel can be fed. Occasionally the forage plants should be sprayed with water. So that the females can lay their eggs in the ground, a slightly moist substrate is necessary, which should cover the floor of the terrarium a few centimeters high.

== Gallery ==
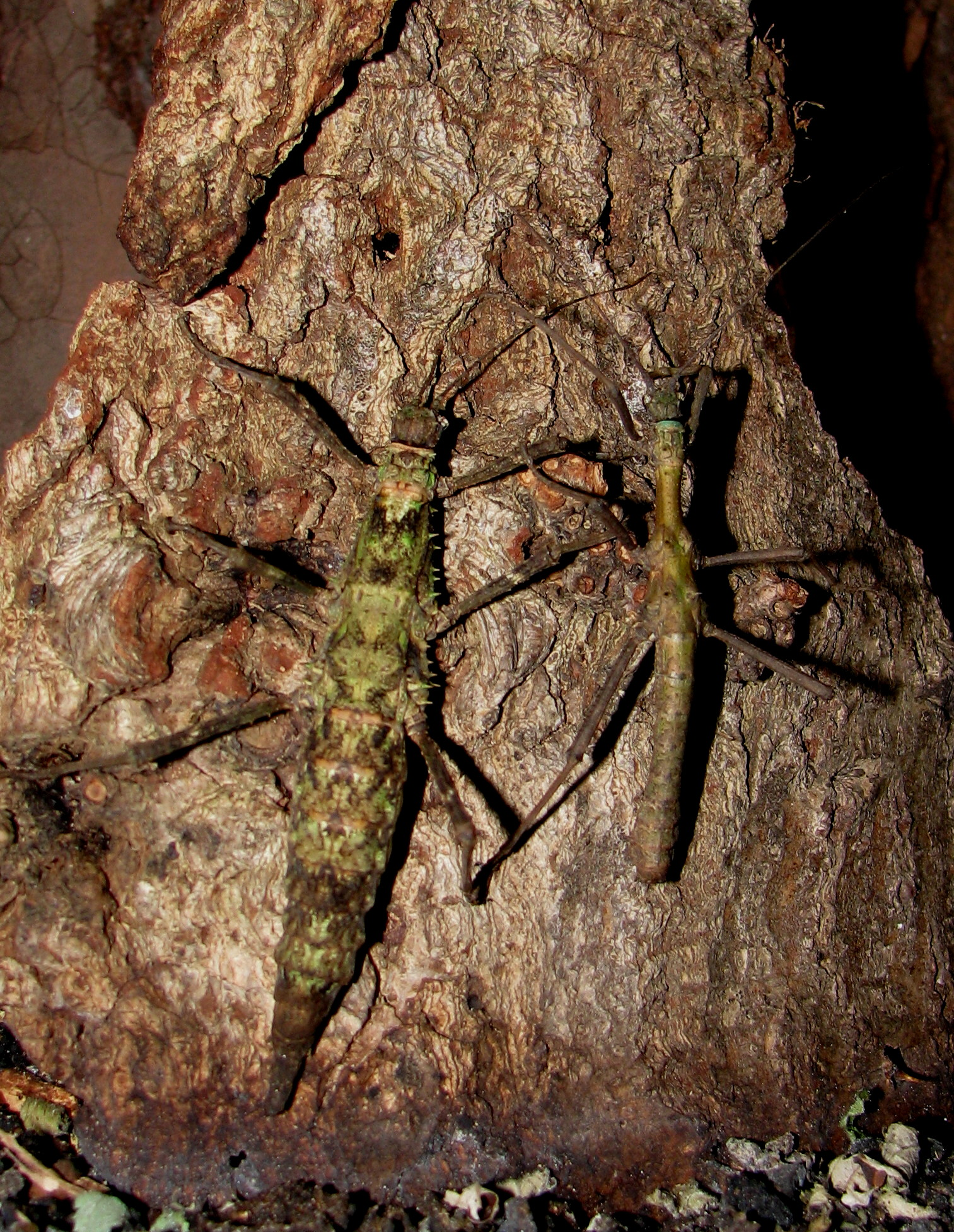
Pair

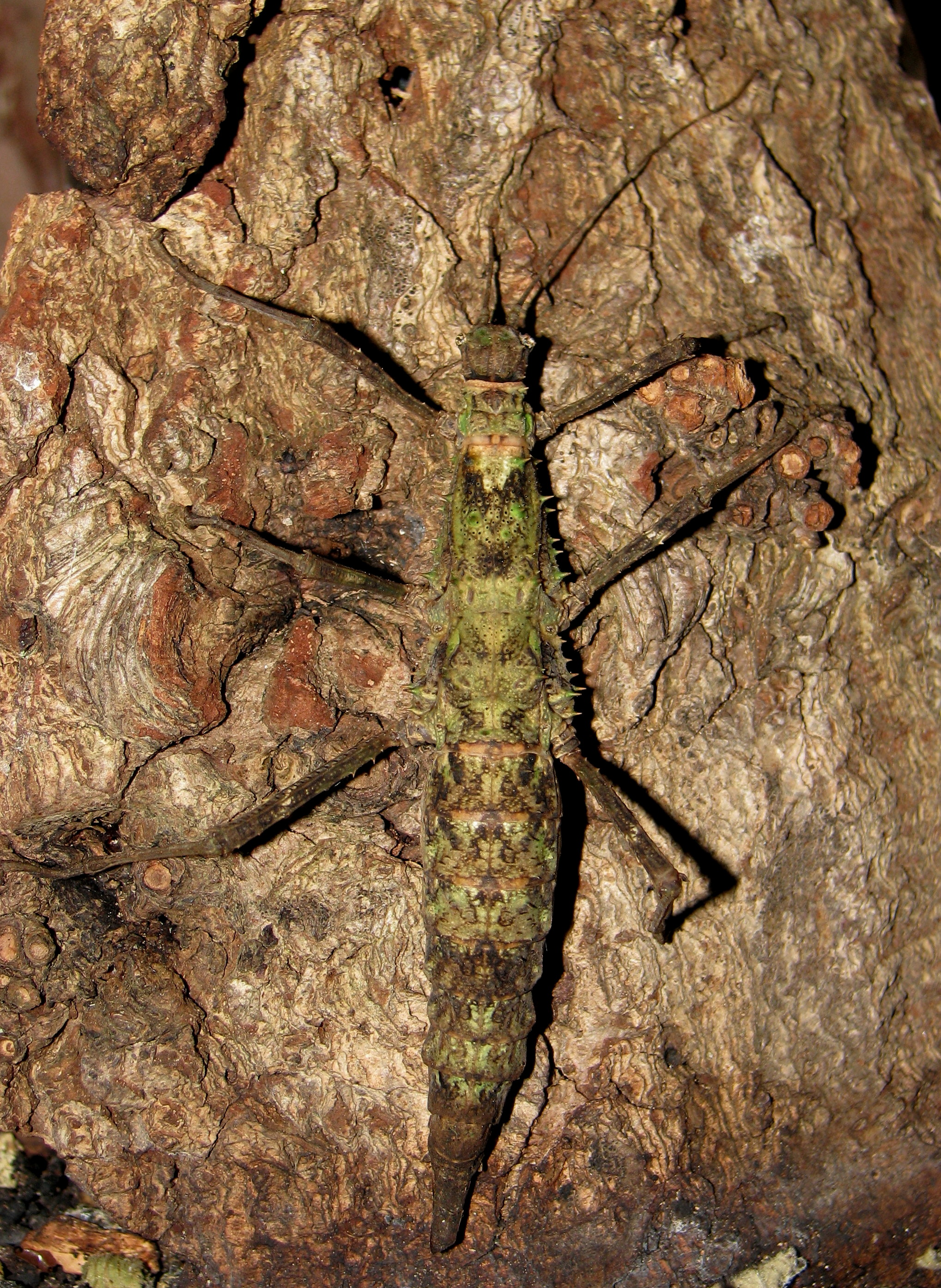
Female

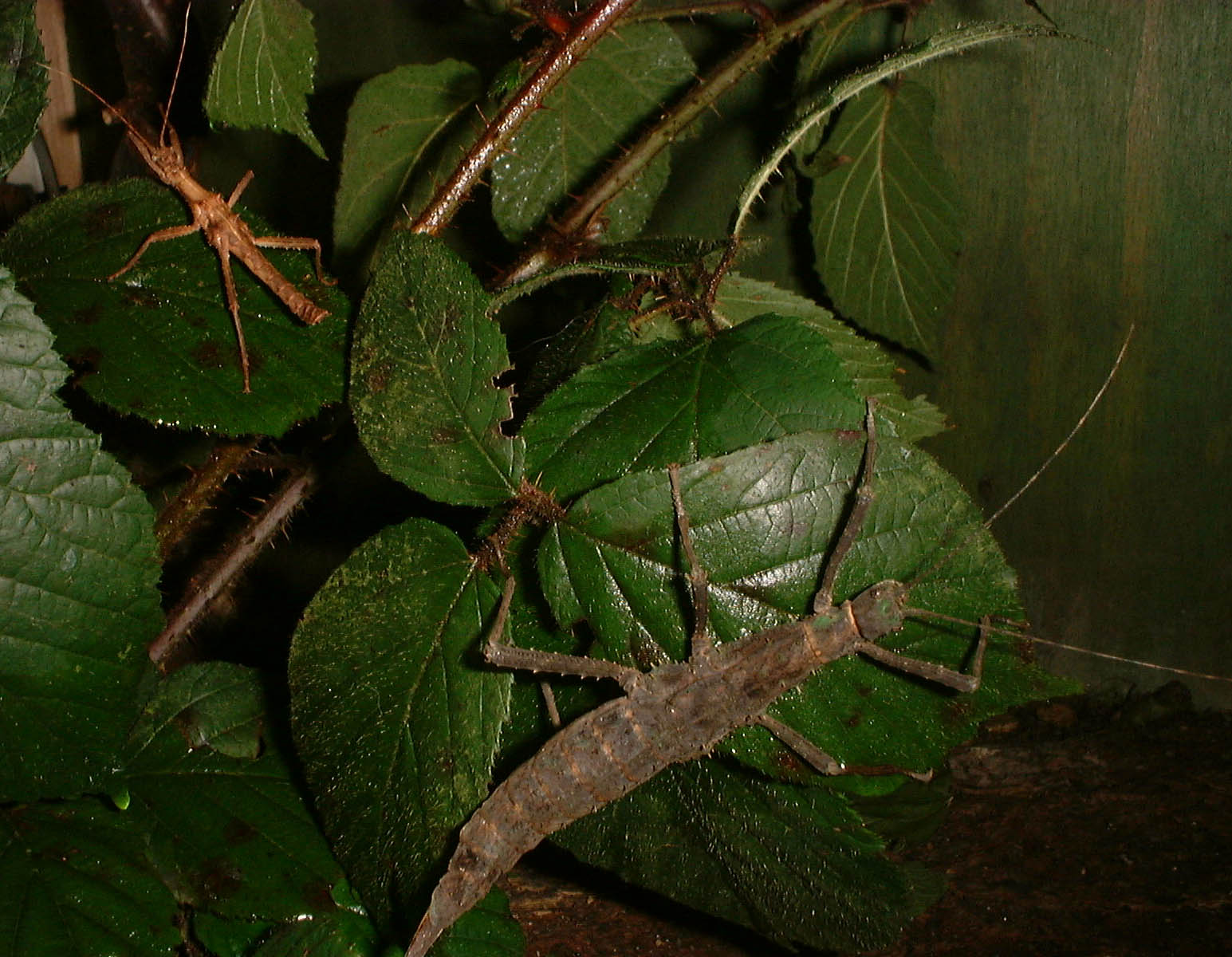
above subaldult male, below female

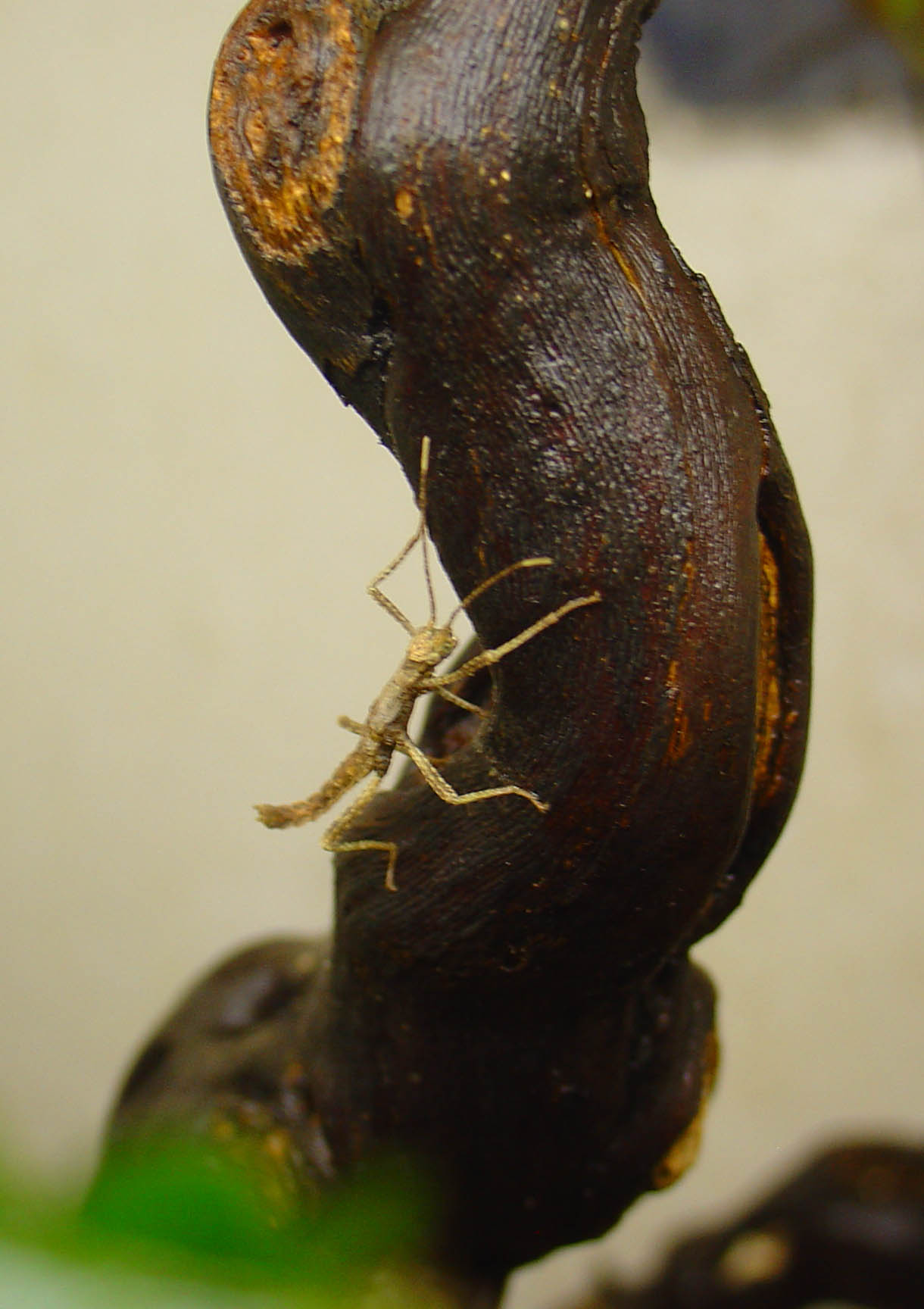
Nymph

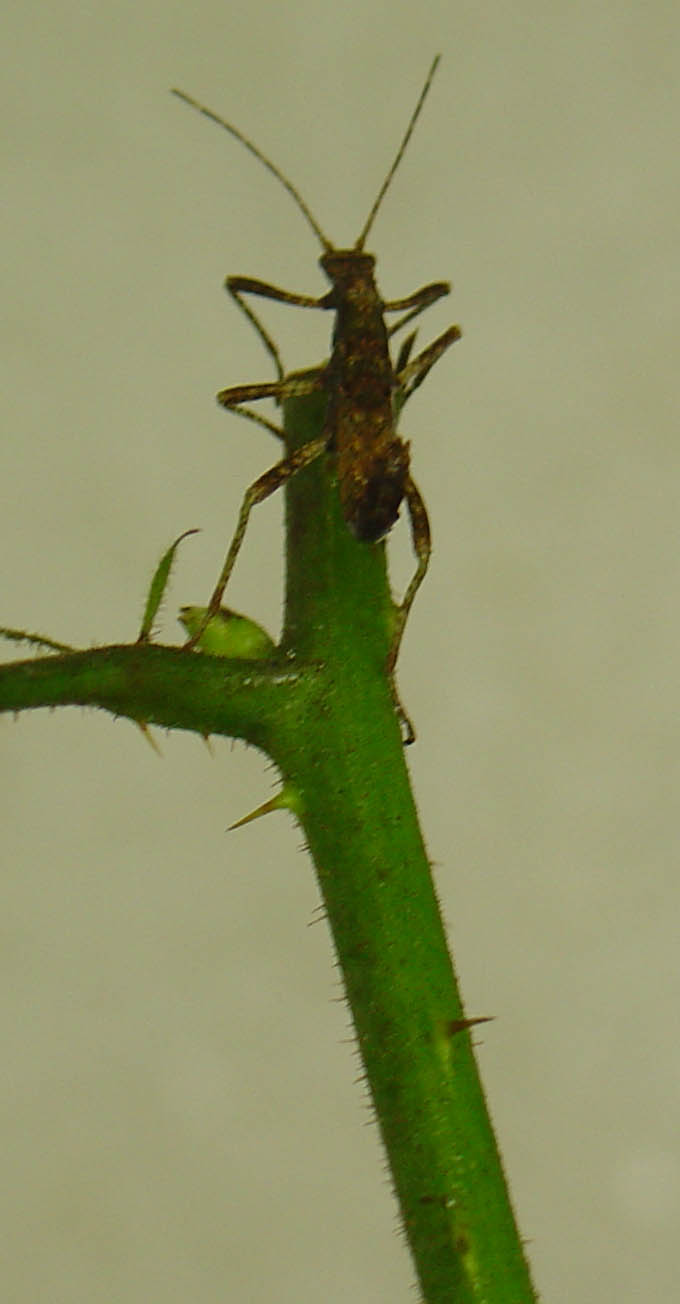
Nymph
