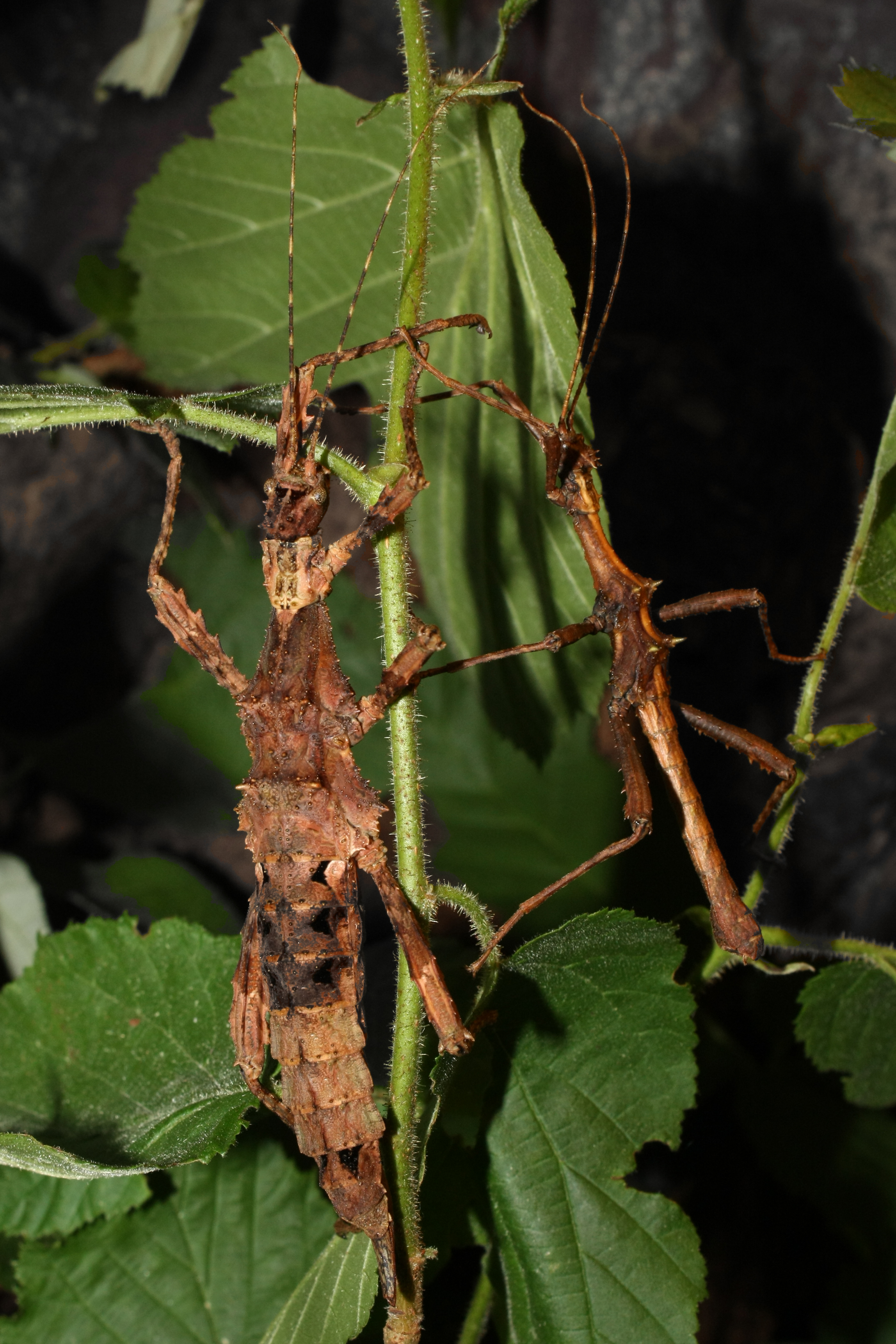
- Pair in Aurora province

Scientific classification
- Kingdom: Animalia
- Phylum: Arthropoda
- Clade: Pancrustacea
- Class: Insecta
- Order: Phasmatodea
- Family: Heteropterygidae
- Genus: Trachyaretaon
- Species: T. bresseeli

Binomial name
- Trachyaretaon bresseeli Hennemann, 2023

= Trachyaretaon bresseeli =

Species of stick insect

Trachyaretaon bresseeli is a species of stick insects in the family Heteropterygidae. It is native to the Philippine island Luzon.

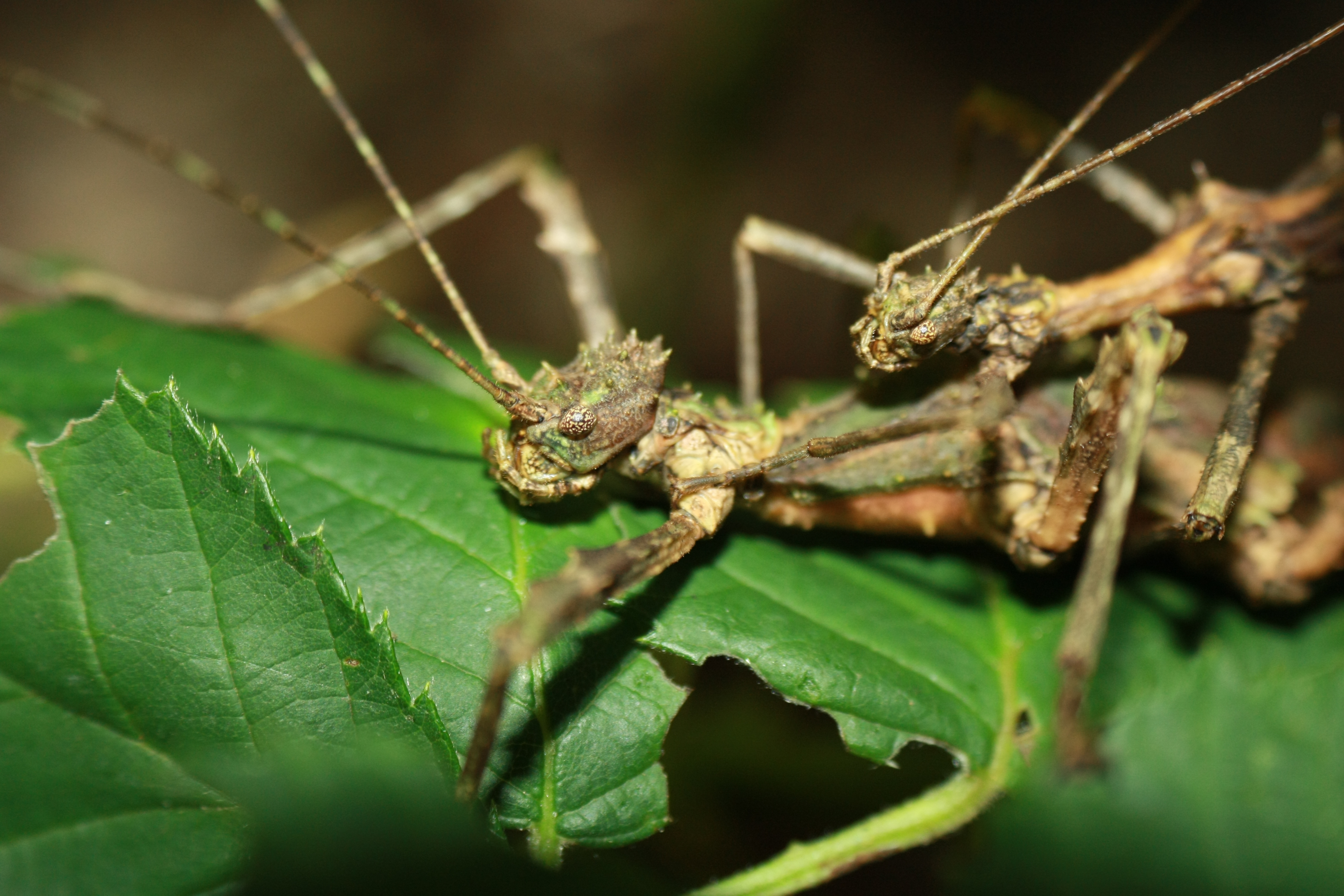
Portrait of a pair from the breeding line from Marinfata

== Description ==
The medium-sized, stocky species is similar to Trachyaretaon mangyan native to Mindoro and the Trachyaretaon nakatago, which also occurs in northern Luzon. The 7.1 to 8.7 centimetres (2.8 to 3.4 in) long females are very variable in color. Although medium brown colors with darker and lighter components usually dominate, various tones from dark to medium brown to yellow brown and ocher to olive can also be found. The terga two to four of the abdomen are usually darker in color than the other segments and have a characteristic inverted V-shaped black marking laterally. The pronotum is usually lighter in color than the rest of the thorax and has two faint dark and closely spaced parallel longitudinal stripes. The mesonotum shows a more or less distinct pale cream or straw-colored, triangular anterior marking. The body structure is rather poorly developed and quite low. The spines located on the posterior meso- and metanotum (meso- and metanotales) are rather conical and multi-humped. The central longitudinal edge on the meso- and metasternum is rather weakly pronounced or barely noticeable. The secondary ovipositor, is formed from the epiproct, which is laterally straight and about 1.5 times longer than that anal segment. In the basal half it is almost parallel and tapers only slightly posteriorly to an obtuse-angled tip that is slightly curved upwards. The ventral subgenital plate of the ovipositor is long, lanceolate and clearly keeled in the posterior half. It is moderately pointed and slightly protrudes beyond the epiproct.

The males are around 5.5 to 6.2 centimetres (2.2 to 2.4 in) long and are significantly less variable in color. Their basic color is usually brown to olive brown. There is a light brown longitudinal line on the meso- and metanotum, which can rarely and usually indistinctly continue on the first segments of the abdomen. Armature of body is moderately developed. The posterior spines on the meso- and metanotum (meso- and metanotales) protrude pointedly and are many-humped around the base. The mesonotum is laterally and posteriorly darker than the rest of the body, as are the pleura, and is usually reddish or medium to dark brown in color.

== Reproduction ==
The 4.5 to 4.6 millimetres (0.18 to 0.18 in) long, 2.6 millimetres (0.10 in) wide and 2.4 millimetres (0.094 in) high, grey-brown eggs are laid in the ground, as with all Obrimini, using the ovipositor at the end of the abdomen. Her capsule is heavily scarred. The operculum and the area around it are covered with very short bristles. As with most Obrimini, the micropylar plate is three-part and Y-shaped. It is rather small and only about 0.65 times as long as the egg capsule. The middle part becomes slightly narrower towards the front and the two posterolateral extensions are small and extend almost at an angle of 90° to the side surfaces of the capsule.

== Taxonomy ==
The first specimens of this species were discovered in July 2009 by Joachim Bresseel, Bellemans, Van Dingeen and Derijck on Luzon in the province of Aurora near the city of San Luis collected at the Cunayan and Ditumabo waterfalls. The specimens of the six wild-caught specimens, which were handed over to Frank H. Hennemann for processing in April 2023, were described by him as Trachyaretaon bresseeli in a work published in November 2023. The name is dedicated to Bresseel, who was the first to collect this species and establish a culture in Europe. Bressell, who himself works taxonomic at the Museum of Natural Sciences in Brussels, was also thanked for his years of friendship and generosity, including: extensive Obrimini material from the collection of the Brussels Museum, much of which was collected by him. The specimens of wild-caught animals are deposited as type material in the Museum of Natural Sciences in Brussels. There is a female deposited there as holotype, three further females and two males from the wild caught animals as paratypes, as well as five further females and eleven males from Bresseel's breeding. Other paratypes from Hennemann's breeding are in his collection.

Sarah Bank et al. already included samples of this species in their studies based on genetic analysis published in 2021 to clarify the phylogeny of the Heteropterygidae, which were here named Trachyaretaon echinatus because of the first original identification of the cultured animals. The investigations show that the species forms a common clade together with previously described species such as Trachyaretaon carmelae, now described species such as Trachyaretaon maliit and species that have not yet been described.

== In terraristics ==
The first representatives of this species were introduced to enthusiasts by Bresseel in 2009. He established a breeding line from the animals he collected in the province of Aurora, which quickly became widespread. It was initially called Trachyaretaon echinatus and has been found in the terrariums of European enthusiasts since around 2010. The incorrect classification was recognized a little later and so the animals were known for a long time under the name Trachyaretaon sp. 'Aurora' in circulation. The Phasmid Study Group lists it under the PSG number 317. In April 2010, Bresseel, Tim Bollens and Rob Krijns collected in Marinfata on the road to Infanta on Luzon an adult female from whose eggs a sexual breeding line could be established. This in turn was identified as Trachyaretaon echinatus and was called Trachyaretaon echinatus 'Marinfata' for years. It is listed by the Phasmid Study Group under the PSG number 326. Both breeding lines were identified by Hennemann as representatives of the same species, which he described as Trachyaretaon bresseeli in 2023.

Like all cultured members of the genus, the species is easy to keep and breed in the terrarium with the leaves of bramble, hazel, ivy, firethorn, psidium or other food plants common to stick insects. To enable egg laying, the bottom of the terrarium should be covered with a slightly moist substrate of soil.

== Gallery ==
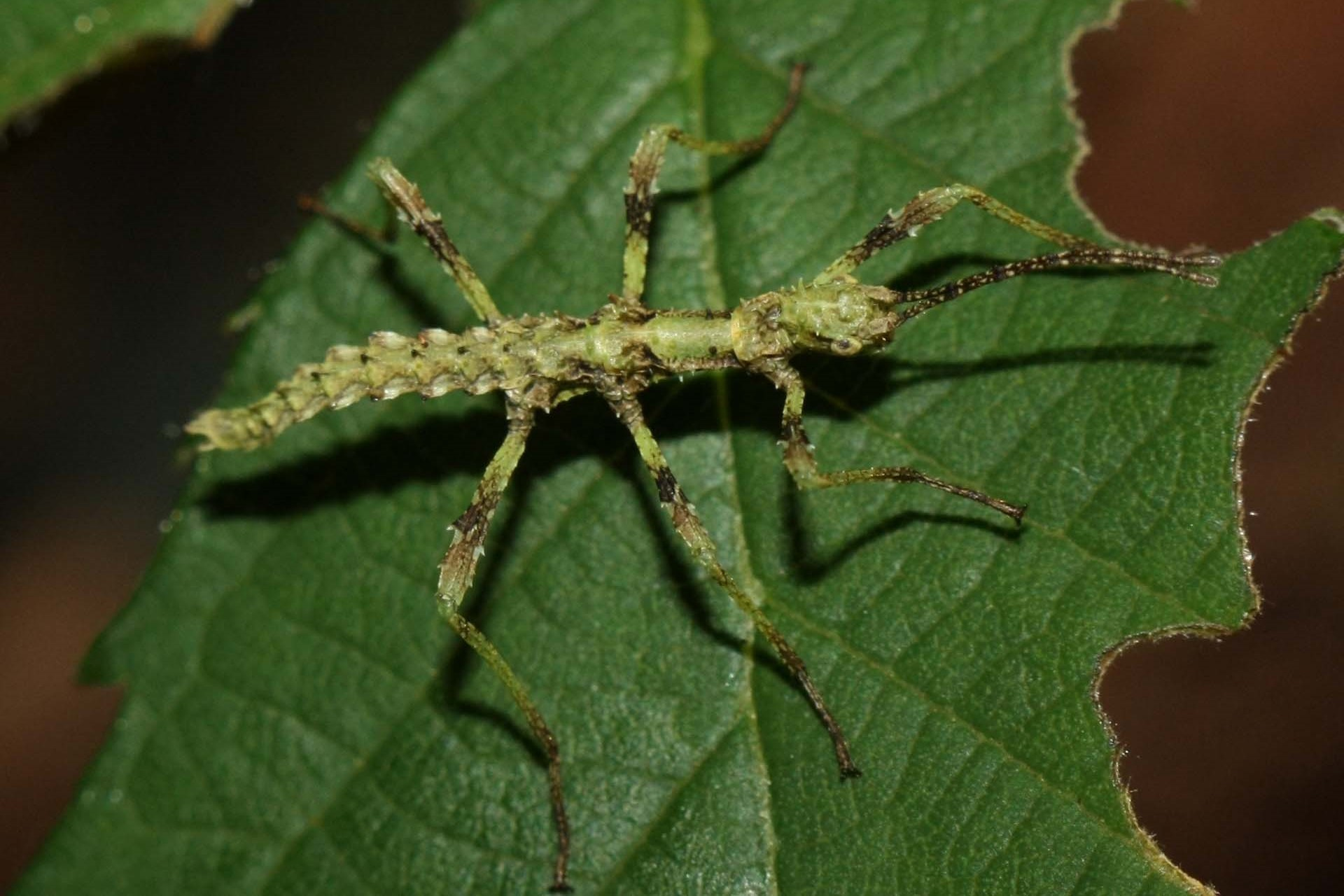
Nymph of the stock from Marinfata

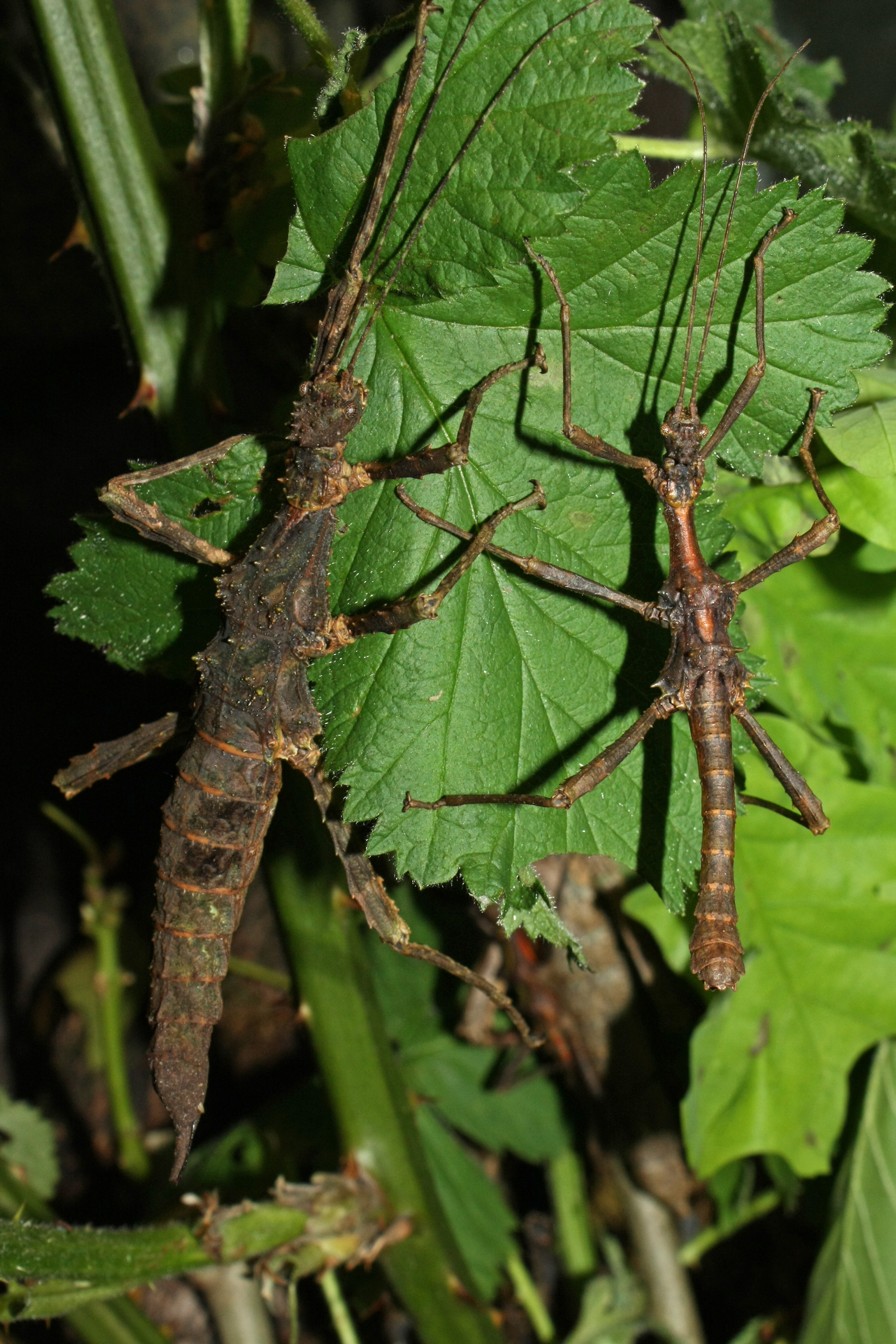
Pair of the stock from Marinfata

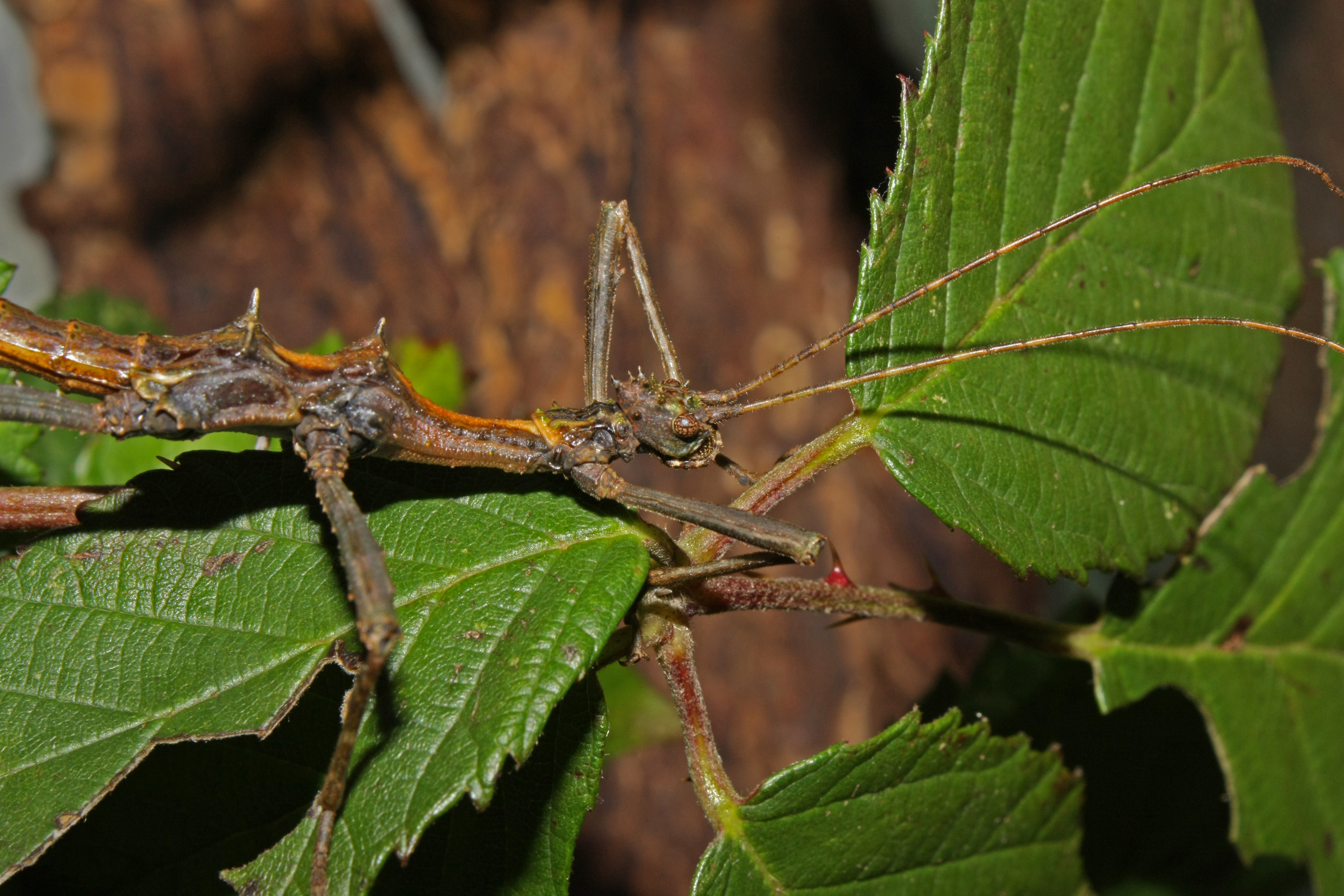
Portrait of a male from the stock from Marinfata

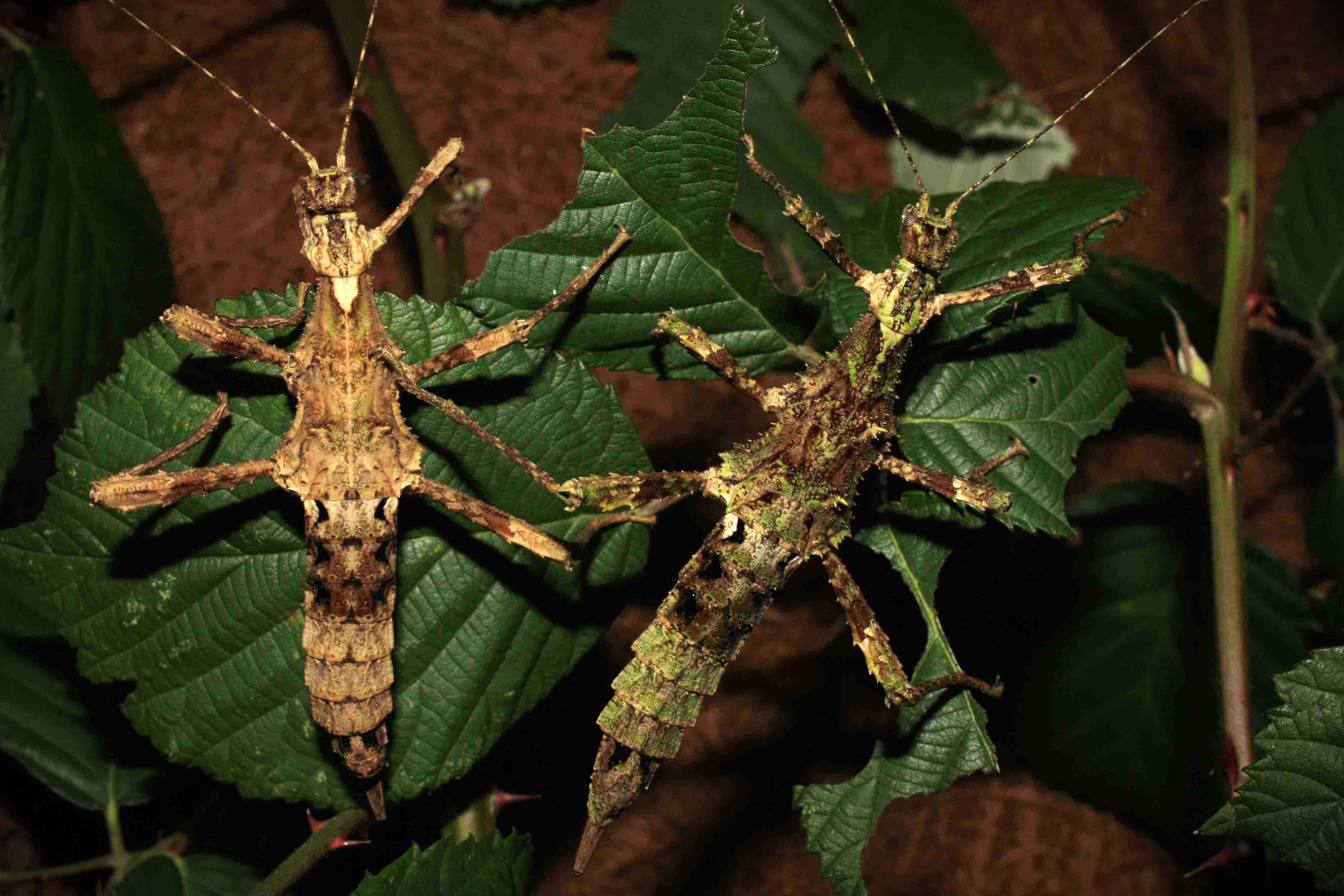
Differently colored females from the stock from Aurora
