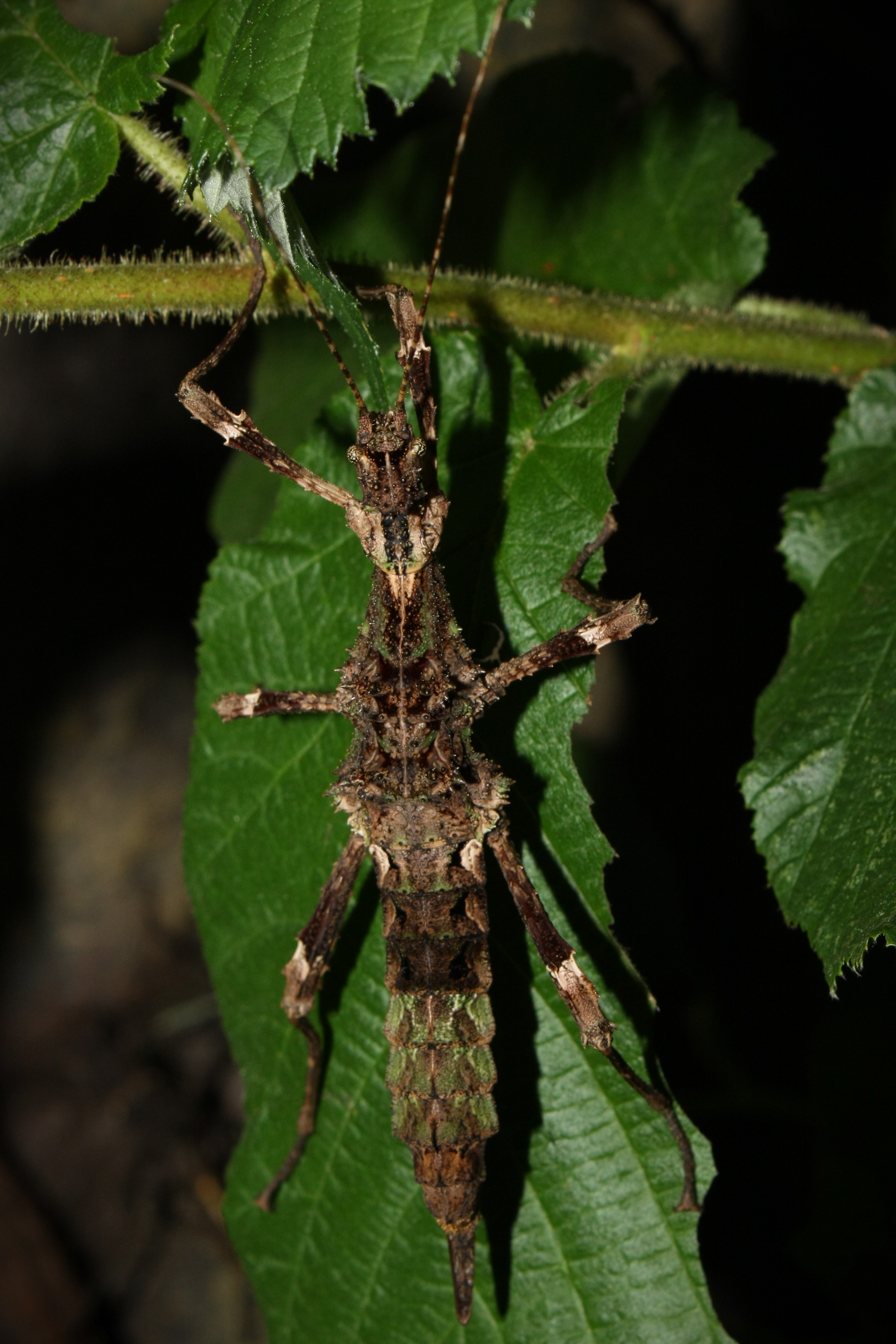
- Trachyaretaon echinatus, female from North Luzon

Scientific classification
- Kingdom: Animalia
- Phylum: Arthropoda
- Clade: Pancrustacea
- Class: Insecta
- Order: Phasmatodea
- Family: Heteropterygidae
- Subfamily: Obriminae
- Tribe: Obrimini
- Genus: Trachyaretaon
- Species: T. echinatus

Binomial name
- Trachyaretaon echinatus (Stål, 1877)

Synonyms
- Obrimus echinatus Stål, 1877; Aretaon (Trachyaretaon) echinatus (Stål, 1877)

= Trachyaretaon echinatus =

Species of stick insect

Trachyaretaon echinatus is the type species of the genus Trachyaretaon in the order of the stick insects.

== Characteristics ==
The females of Trachyaretaon echinatus reach lengths of 71 to 86 millimetres (2.8 to 3.4 in). Males grow up to 47 to 48 millimetres (1.9 to 1.9 in) long. The lively green-brown to black-brown and very variable coloring can be dominated by dark green tones in the females. In addition to black areas on the front segments of the abdomen, they can also have white bands on the femurs or a white triangle on the pronotum. They are morphologically similar to those of the slightly smaller Trachyaretaon gatla, in which the supraanal plate (epiproct), i.e. the eleventh tergite, as well as the seventh sternite of the abdomen is clearly notched, while in the females of Trachyaretaon echinatus it ends rounded or truncated. The abdominal tergites two to seven are almost twice as wide as long, the tergites six to nine are smooth or indistinctly keeled, unlike in Trachyaretaon gatla. Compared to the significantly larger and less spined Trachyaretaon carmelae, the tiny spines between the large teeth on the ventral carina of the meso- and metafemurs are missing in both sexes.

== Distribution ==
While only the Philippines are mentioned as the original locality, in subsequent works the islands Luzon, Sibuyan and Masbate are mentioned as the distribution area. Because the specimens described from outside Luton are all nymphs, the locations outside of Luzon cannot be confirmed with certainty. On Luzon, specimens have been found in the provinces Mountain Province, Nueva Vizcaya, Aurora, Quezon and Sorsogon.

== Way of life and reproduction ==
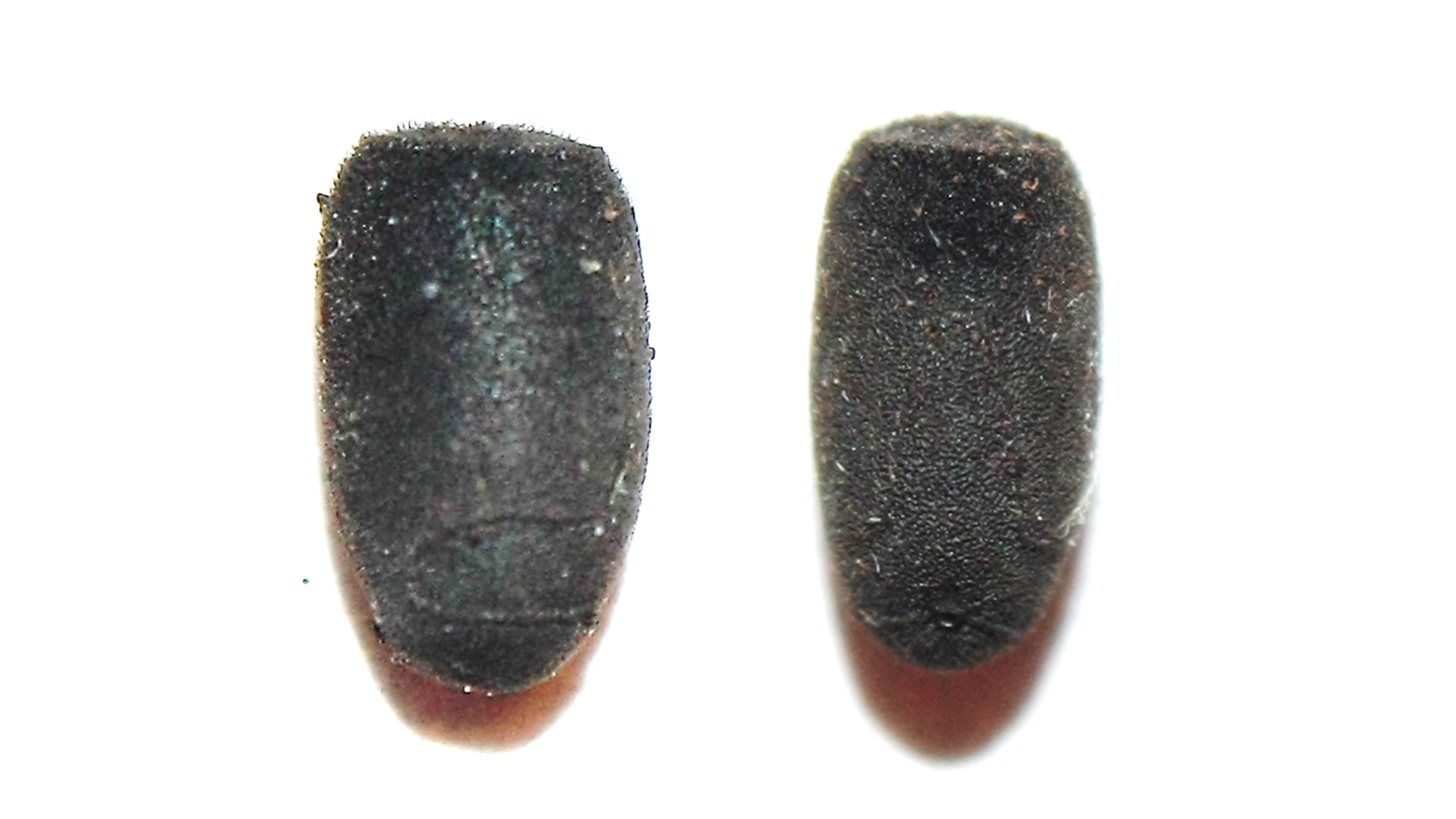
Eggs in lateral and dorsal view

Mango and guava are known to be food plants for Trachyaretaon echinatus. Since both crops are in the range of the species, it is sometimes considered a pest species there. The females lay the eggs, which are about 4 to 45 millimetres (0.16 to 1.77 in) long and 2 to 25 millimetres (0.079 to 0.984 in) wide and high, in clutches of 10 to 15 pieces in the ground at a depth of only about 1 centimetre (0.39 in). The nymphs, which are 41 millimetres (1.6 in) long, hatch after about four to five months. Females need about six months to become adult and another five to six weeks before they begin laying eggs. After that, a clutch of eggs is laid approximately every two to three weeks.

== Taxonomy ==
Carl Stål described the species in 1877 under the basionym Obrimus echinatus using a 77 millimetres (3.0 in) long female, which is deposited as a holotype in the Naturhistoriska riksmuseet in Stockholm. The species name "echinatus" refers to the prickly body surface (ancient Greek echínos (ἐχῖνος) for Sea urchins (Echinoidea)). In 1939 James Abram Garfield Rehn and his son John W. H. Rehn described the genus Aretaon with the subgenera Aretaon and Trachyaretaon. In the subgenus Trachyaretaon she transferred as the only species Obrimus echinatus, which was thus referred to as Aretaon (Trachyaretaon) echinatus. In 2004, Oliver Zompro elevated this subgenus to the rank of a genus, the type species of which is Trachyaretaon echinatus.

== In terraristics ==
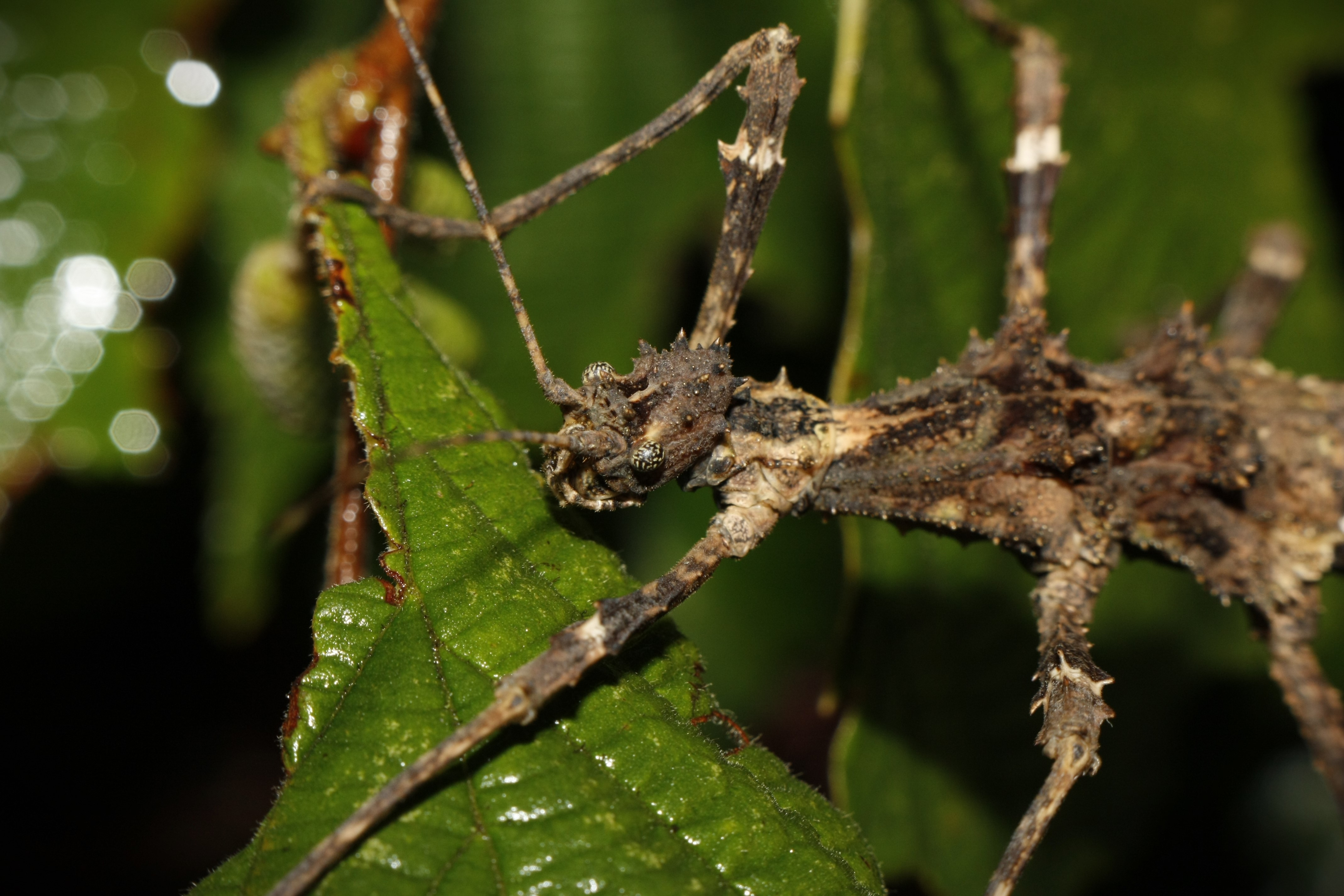
Portrait of a female from the North Luzon stock

Two parthenogenetic breeding lines of the species can be found in the terrariums of the enthusiasts. The first goes back to females that Dave Navarro collected in northern Luzon in 2008. They formed the basis of a stock initially referred to as Trachyaretaon sp. 'North-Luzon'. Local naturalists found in the province of Nueva Vizcaya near the Imugan Falls in June 2015 females from a very similar population at two independent locations. Because only females hatched from the eggs of the adult collected females, it is assumed that the species occurs purely parthenogenetically in this region. The representatives of the resulting breeding strain were named Trachyaretaon sp. 'Imugan Falls'. They were first raised and distributed by Bruno Kneubühler. Frank H. Hennemann identified the representatives of these two tribes in 2023 as Trachyaretaon echinatus.

Two sexual breeding lines collected on Luzon in 2009 and 2010 were temporarily referred to as Trachyaretaon echinatus. The specimens collected in Aurora Province in 2009 were initially referred to as Trachyaretaon echinatus. After additional animals were found in 2010, they were named Trachyaretaon sp. 'Aurora'. Until 2023, a stock collected in Marinfata on the road to Infanta in 2010 were considered Trachyaretaon echinatus. Both breeding lines were identified by Hennemann in 2023 as representatives of a new species, which he described as Trachyaretaon bresseeli.

Keeping and breeding is considered easy. A wide variety of forage plants such as bramble, hazel, firethorn and ivy are eaten. Moderately moist terrariums with substrate for laying eggs are required for breeding.
