= Trachyaretaon gatla =

Scientific classification
- Kingdom: Animalia
- Phylum: Arthropoda
- Clade: Pancrustacea
- Class: Insecta
- Order: Phasmatodea
- Family: Heteropterygidae
- Subfamily: Obriminae
- Tribe: Obrimini
- Genus: Trachyaretaon
- Species: T. gatla

Binomial name
- Trachyaretaon gatla Zompro, 2004

Species of stick insect

Trachyaretaon gatla is a species of Phasmatodea native to the Philippine island Palawan.

== Distribution area ==
The species is so far only known from a single female who was found on May 28, 1991 at waterfalls in Port Barton 120 km northeast of Puerto Princesa, the capital of the province of Palawan. This makes Trachyaretaon gatla the only species of the genus from the island of Palawan so far. All other representatives come either from Luzon or from the upstream Babuyan Islands to the north.

== Characteristics ==
In contrast to the other described species of the genus, Trachyaretaon gatla with 71 millimetres (2.8 in) body length is somewhat smaller than the other species, where the size of Trachyaretaon echinatus is given by Joseph Redtenbacher with only 70 to 77 millimetres (2.8 to 3.0 in). In contrast to this, in Trachyaretaon gatla the supraanal plate (epiproct), ie the eleventh tergite as well as the seventh sternite of the abdomen are clearly notched. The coloring is dominated by different shades of red and brown. The arrangement and shape of the spines can be described as follows (see also Acanthotaxy of Heteropterygidae). On the head the supra-antennals protrude, the medial coronals are arranged in a circle with two small spines inside. Of the supra orbitals, only the anterior ones are formed as large spines. The four coronals are the same size. thorax and abdomen with median, sometimes interrupted edge. The anterolateral spines on the pronotum are present. The pronotum shows a transverse depression. On the mesonotum there are short but broad premedial spines and four median mesonotals arranged in a group. The posterior mesonotals are compound and stand out clearly. The lateral spines are short. The metanotum shows both anterior and very distinct and composite posterior metanotals. On the pleura of the metanotum, compound supracoxals located above the coxae. The median segment (first abdominal segment) has anterior, medial, and posterior spines, with the rear pair being larger than the pairs in front. The second to ninth abdominal segments are about the same length. On the second to fourth segments there is a submedial and sublateral spine. On the seventh to ninth segments there is a distinctive crest, which is located on the seventh segment in the rear half. It is narrower on the eighth segment than on the seventh, but high in the middle. On the ninth segment, the ridge protrudes beyond the rear edge of the segment. The seventh abdominal segment has a postero medial notch. The supraanal plate is elongated and rectangular, does not extend to the tip of the subgenital plate and also has a notch at the back. The elongated subgenital plate has a sharp longitudinal keel ventrally.

== Taxonomy ==
Oliver Zompro described the species in 2004 using an adult female. It was declared as holotype of the species and is in the author's collection, which, according to him, is affiliated with the Zoological Museum of Kiel University, but is not available there. The species name "gatla" is derived from the Filipino Tagalog language and means there roughly "notched". It refers to the notch on the supraanal plate.
