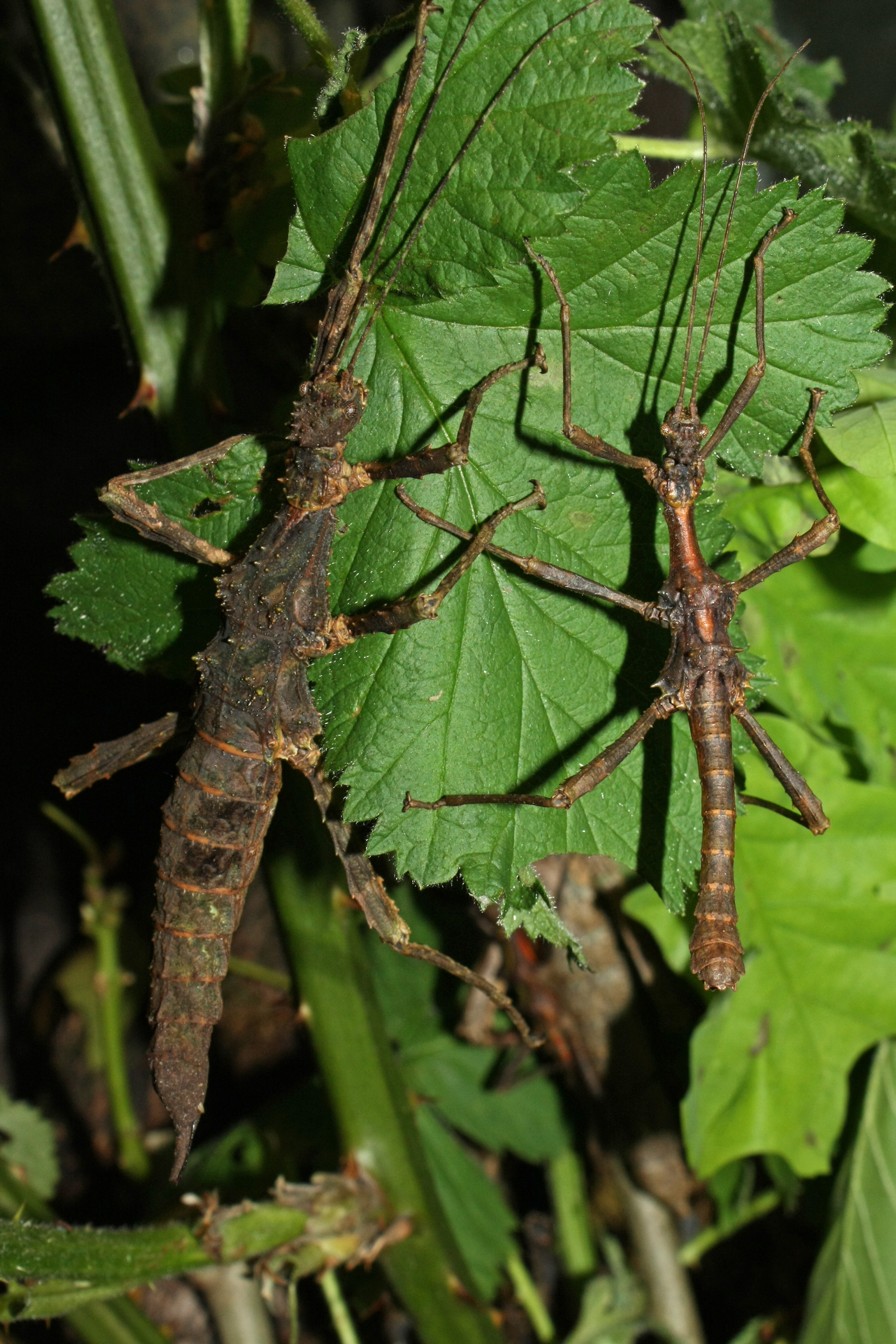
- Trachyaretaon bresseeli from Marinfata, left female, right male

Scientific classification
- Kingdom: Animalia
- Phylum: Arthropoda
- Class: Insecta
- Order: Phasmatodea
- Superfamily: Bacilloidea
- Family: Heteropterygidae
- Subfamily: Obriminae
- Tribe: Obrimini
- Genus: Trachyaretaon; Rehn, J.A.G. & Rehn, J.W.H., 1939

Type species
- Trachyaretaon echinatus (Stål, 1877)

Species
- List: Trachyaretaon bresseeli; Trachyaretaon carmelae; Trachyaretaon echinatus; Trachyaretaon gatla; Trachyaretaon maliit; Trachyaretaon mangyan; Trachyaretaon nakatago; Trachyaretaon negrosanon; Trachyaretaon tumandok

= Trachyaretaon =

Genus of stick insects

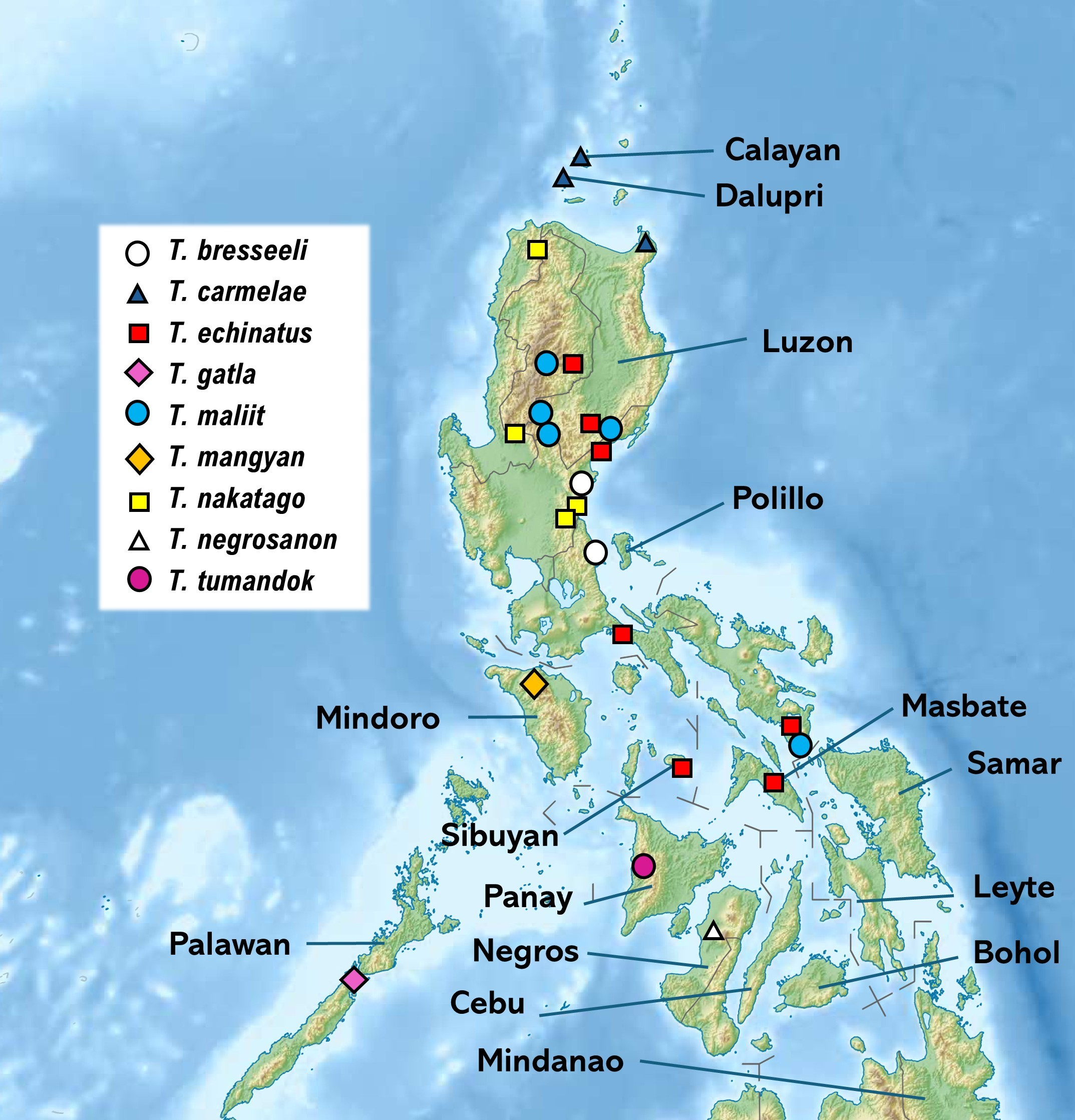
Distribution of the Trachyaretaon species according to Hennemann 2023

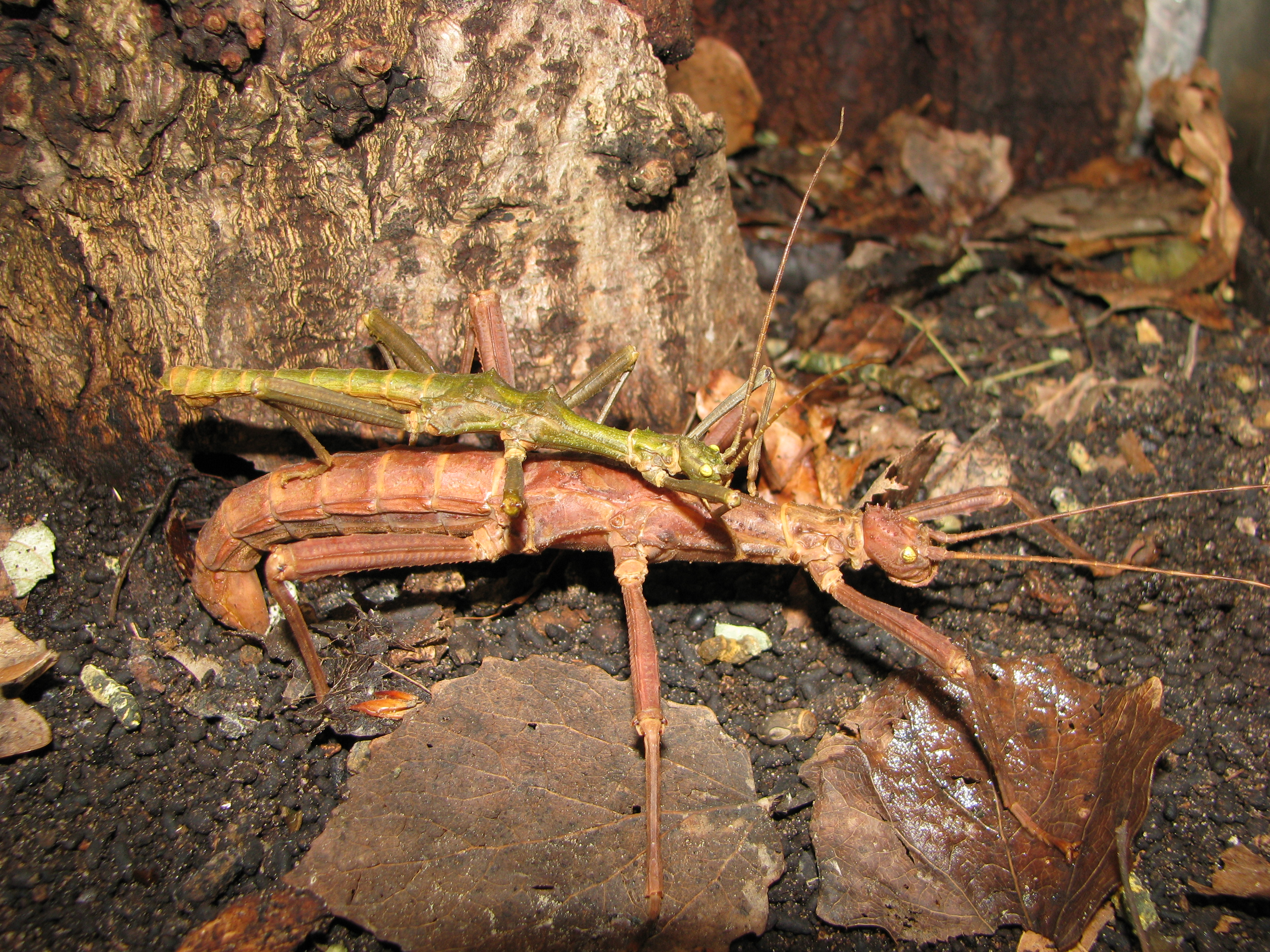
Trachyaretaon carmelae, pair

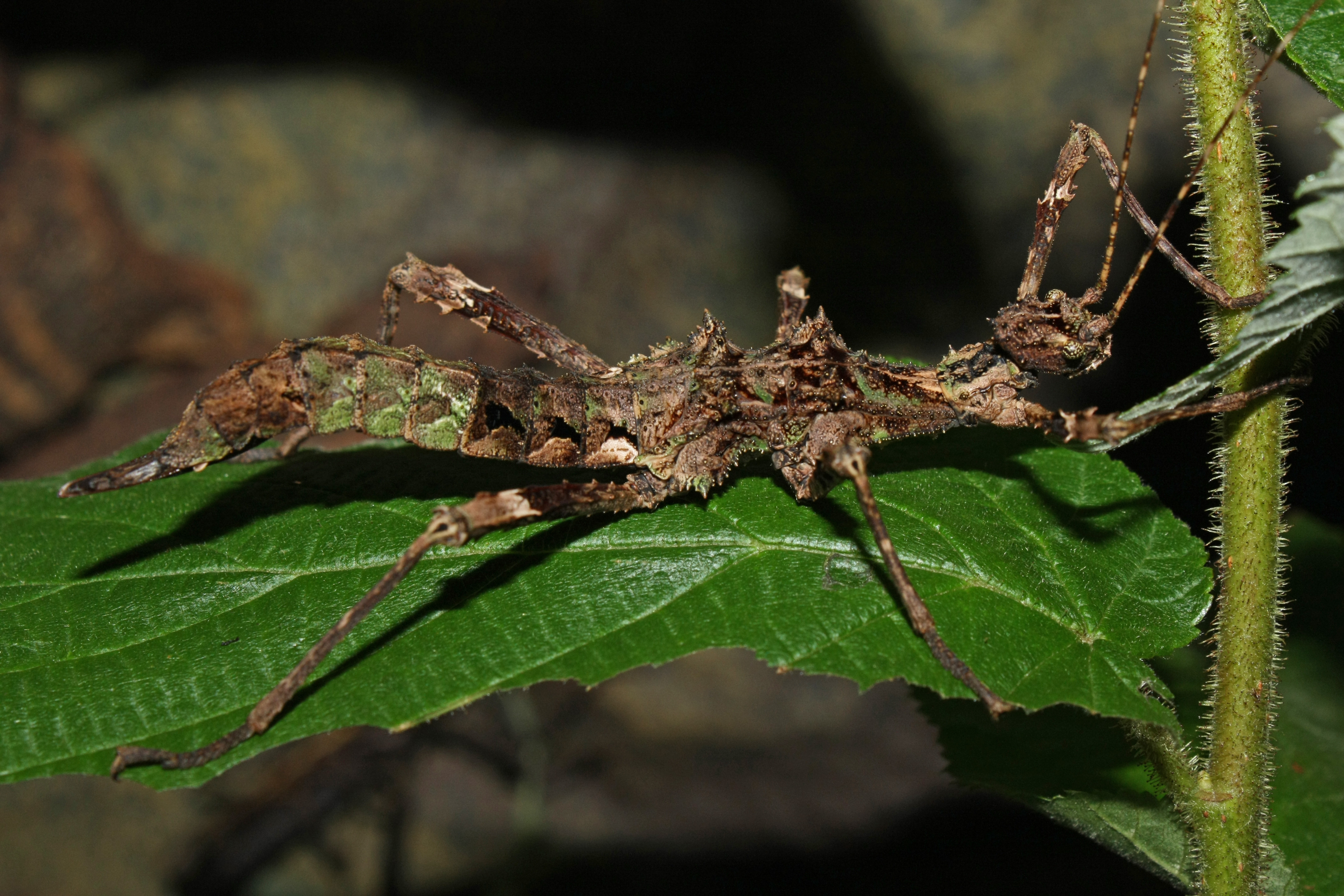
Trachyaretaon echinatus, female from 'North-Luzon'

Pair of Trachyaretaon negrosanon from Negros Island

Trachyaretaon is a genus of stick insects native to the Philippines.

== Description ==
The representatives of this genus correspond in the habitus typical representatives of the Obrimini and are very similar in appearance to the species of the genera Aretaon and Sungaya. Like these, they are wingless in either sex. The males of the previously known species are around 4.0 to 7.5 centimetres (1.6 to 3.0 in) in length and are smaller than the females which are 6.0 to 13.5 centimetres (2.4 to 5.3 in) in length. In egg-laying adult females, the abdomen in the middle is clearly thickened in height and width and thus almost circular in cross-section. As with the other genera of the Obriminae, a secondary ovipositor at the end of the abdomen surrounds the actual ovipositor. It is ventral formed from the eighth sternite, which is called subgenital plate or operculum and dorsally from the eleventh tergum, which here is called the supraanal plate or epiproct.

In contrast to Aretaon species, those of the genus Trachyaretaon lack the clear spines in the front area of the mesonotum. Unlike the representatives of the genera Brasidas and Obrimus are found in them in the metasternum neither holes nor pits nor noticeable slits. The Trachyaretaon species differ from Sungaya in the shape of the eggs, among other things.

== Distribution ==
The previously known distribution area of the genus extends over the Philippine islands Palawan, Luzon and Babuyan Islands. On the latter, representatives on Calayan Island and Dalupiri are proven. In addition, representatives live on the Visayas Islands, more precisely on Negros and Panay. Whether the genus also occurs on Mindanao is uncertain or still controversial.

== Way of life and reproduction ==
Although all species are active at night and at dawn, they hardly hide. During the day they can usually be found on the food plants that they feed on at night. The cylindrical or projectile-shaped eggs are relatively small, 4 to 5 millimetres (0.16 to 0.20 in) mm long and 2 to 3 millimetres (0.079 to 0.118 in) to mm wide, even in larger species. They are usually dark gray to dark brown in color and resemble their faeces. At the front pole of the eggs there is a circular lid (operculum). The micropylar plate has three arms and its shape usually resembles an upside-down "Y", with the arm pointing toward the lid being significantly longer than the arms pointing toward the lower pole, which can also be bent. The eggs are laid in the ground using ovipositor. The nymphs hatch after three to four months. They are clearly more prickly than the imago. Depending on the species and sex, it takes five to eight months until they are adult. Males take less time. In some Trachyaretaon species parthenogenesis has been found.

- - - Mearnsiana
    - Aretaon
  - - Eubulides
    - - Trachyaretaon negrosanon**
        (Obrimini sp. 'Negros')*
      - - Sungaya
        - Trachyaretaon
          - - Trachyaretaon carmelae
            - - Trachyaretaon sp. 2 (Mt. Osiao)
              - Trachyaretaon bresseeli** 'Marinfata'
                (Trachyaretaon echinatus)*
          - - Trachyaretaon sp. 4 (Sierra Madre)
            - - Trachyaretaon sp. 3 (Barlig)* =
                Trachyaretaon maliit**
              - Trachyaretaon sp. 5 (Sierra Madre) =
                Trachyaretaon sp. 1 (Mt. Pullol)

Relationships of the Trachyaretaon species or stocks and their sister genera examined so far by genetic analysis according to Sarah Bank et al. (2021), *original species assignment, **species assignment updated according to Frank Hennemann (2023)

== Taxonomy ==
In 1939 James Abram Garfield Rehn and his son John William Holman Rehn established the genus Aretaon with the subgenus Trachyaretaon. In this they placed a species already described as Obrimus echinatus in 1877. While "Aretaon" is borrowed from Greek mythology, where it is among other things the name of a defender of Troy, the Prefix "Trachy" comes from the Greek trachys (τραχύς), which means rough and refers to the texture of the body surface. Trachyaretaon was transferred in 2004 by Oliver Zompro to the rank of a genus, whose type species thereby became Trachyaretaon echinatus. In addition, with Trachyaretaon gatla another species was described.

In 2005 Ireneo L. Lit, Jr. and Orlando L. Eusebio described Trachyaretaon carmelae, the largest species of the genus to date. The description was based on specimens collected the year before on the island of Dalupiri. Already in 2003 animals were found on the neighboring island of Calayan, which were described by Oskar V. Conle and Frank H. Hennemann as Trachyaretaon brueckneri in 2006. Since the publication of the description was delayed, it overlapped with that of Lit and Eusebio. A short time later, Conle and Hennemann discovered that Trachyaretaon brueckneri is the same species previously described as Trachyaretaon carmelae. Since then, they have also given Trachyaretaon carmelae as a valid name for Trachyaretaon brueckneri. A formal synonymization took place in 2023 along with the description of six additional species.

In May 2008 Jeffebeck Arimas collected specimens from the volcanoes Kanlaon and Mandalagan on Negros Island, which were initially known as Trachyaretaon sp. 'Negros'. In 2021 published genetic analysis carried out on the phylogeny of the Heteropterygidae show that this species does not belong to Trachyaretaon. It is more closely related to Sungaya, with which it has already been crossed. Hennemann described it in 2023 as Trachyaretaon negrosanon.

The species described so far are:

- Trachyaretaon bresseeli Hennemann, 2023
- Trachyaretaon carmelae Lit & Eusebio, 2005

(Syn. = Trachyaretaon brueckneri Conle & Hennemann, 2006)

- Trachyaretaon echinatus (Stål, 1877)
- Trachyaretaon gatla Zompro, 2004
- Trachyaretaon maliit Hennemann, 2023
- Trachyaretaon mangyan Hennemann, 2023
- Trachyaretaon nakatago Hennemann, 2023
- Trachyaretaon negrosanon Hennemann, 2023
- Trachyaretaon tumandok Hennemann, 2023

In 2005 Lit and Eusebio described another species as Trachyaretaon manobo, which was found on Mount Apo on Mindanao. A short time later, specialists such as Joachim Bresseel assumed that this species was not a member of the genus Trachyaretaon, but rather the Mearnsiana bullosa described in 1939. In 2016, Hennemann et al synonymized Trachyaretaon manobo with Mearnsiana bullosa.

== In terraristics ==
The first animals of the genus that found their way into the lovers' terrariums go back to the animals collected by Ismael O. Lumawig on Calayan Island in April 2003, which are also the basis for the description of Trachyaretaon brueckneri. For this reason, they were initially in circulation under this name. Since around 2009 the species has been referred to almost everywhere as Trachyaretaon carmelae. The Phasmid Study Group gave the species PSG number 255.

Trachyaretaon negrosanon collected in May 2008 in Negros Occidental was first raised in Europe in 2009 by Bruno Kneubühler and distributed under the Trachyaretaon sp. 'Negros'.

In 2008, Dave Navarro found several females and female nymphs of the genus in the north of Luzon in Mountain Province. They form the basis of a parthenogenetic breeding line which was initially called Trachyaretaon sp. 'North-Luzon' was called. Also on Luzon, more precisely in the more southern province Nueva Vizcaya near the Imugan Falls, local naturalists found females from a very similar population at two independent locations. Since only females hatched from the eggs of the adult collected females, it is assumed that the species occurs purely parthenogenetically in this region. The representatives of the resulting breeding strain were also named Trachyaretaon sp. 'Imugan Falls'. These two strains were also raised and distributed for the first time by Kneubühler. Hennemann identified the representatives of these two strains as Trachyaretaon echinatus in 2023.

An initially undescribed species was discovered in 2009 by Bresseel also on Luzon in Aurora province near the city of San Luis at the waterfalls of Cunayan and Ditumabo. It was first called Trachyaretaon echinatus and has been found in the terrariums of European enthusiasts since around 2011. The incorrect classification was recognized a little later and so the stock was in circulation for a long time under the name Trachyaretaon sp. 'Aurora'. The Phasmid Study Group lists it under the PSG number 317. In April 2010, Bresseel, Tim Bollens and Rob Krijns collected an adult female in Marinfata on the road to Infanta in Quezon province on Luzon. From their eggs a sexual stock could be established. This in turn was identified as Trachyaretaon echinatus and was referred to as Trachyaretaon echinatus 'Marinfata' for years. It is listed by the Phasmid Study Group under the PSG number 326. Both breeding lines were identified by Hennemann as representatives of the same species, which he described in 2023 as Trachyaretaon bresseeli.

The keeping and breeding of the species mentioned is considered easy. They willingly feed on various forage plants such as bramble, hazel, firethorn and ivy. They need moderately moist terrariums with a substrate for laying eggs.
