= Trachyaretaon negrosanon =

- Trachyaretaon negrosanon, pair

Scientific classification
- Kingdom: Animalia
- Phylum: Arthropoda
- Clade: Pancrustacea
- Class: Insecta
- Order: Phasmatodea
- Family: Heteropterygidae
- Genus: Trachyaretaon
- Species: T. negrosanon

Binomial name
- Trachyaretaon negrosanon Hennemann 2023

Species of stick insect

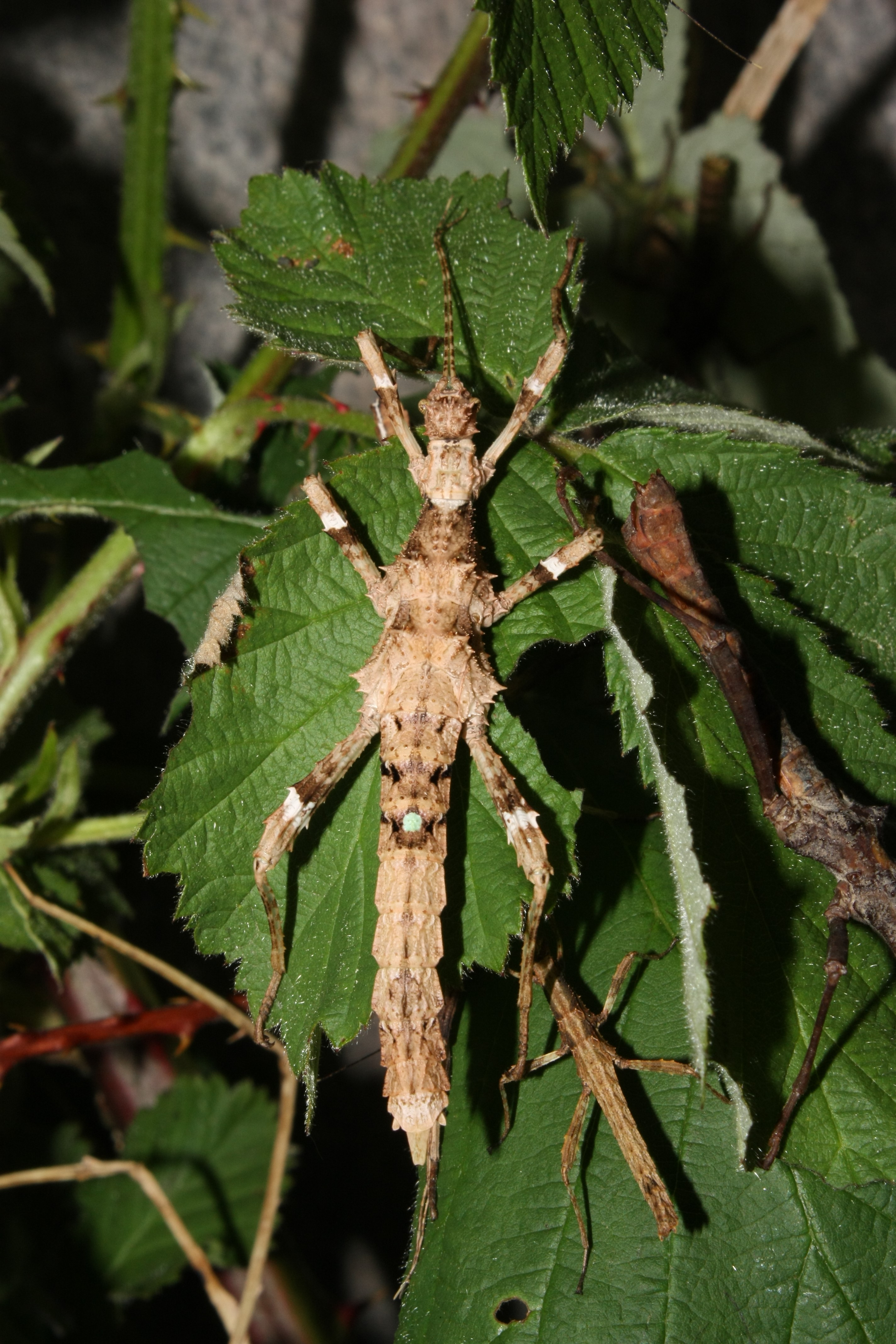
Juvenile hybrid of Trachyaretaon negrosanon und Sungaya aeta

Trachyaretaon negrosanon is a stick insect species from the family Heteropterygidae native to Negros.

== Characteristics ==
In habit the species corresponds to typical representatives of the Obrimini, but shows very characteristic features in both sexes. The females have a mossy green-brown overall color and reach a length of around 72 to 80 millimetres (2.8 to 3.1 in). Unique is a bright greenish-white spot located on the fourth tergite of the abdomen, which is wider at the base and narrows towards the posterior edge of the tergite. Rarely there is a small spot on the fifth tergite. The secondary ovipositor is formed dorsally from the supraanal plate (epiproct), which is laterally straight and about 1.8 times longer than the anal segment. Longitudinally it is weakly pointed and gradually tapers to a bluntly rounded to weakly notched tip. The ventral subgenital plate of the ovopositor is long, lanceolate and clearly keeled in the basal half. It is pointed and overhangs the tip of the epiproct.

The males are around 45 to 55 millimetres (1.8 to 2.2 in) long. The black colored sternites two to seven of the abdomen are characteristic of them. This coloring otherwise only occurs in the males of the much larger Trachyaretaon tumandok. Adulte males of Trachyaretaon negrosanon have less green coloring than the females. Light to medium brown tones usually dominate. An often yellow-brown, rarely greenish longitudinal line runs over the meso- and metanotum and, more indistinctly, over the first six abdominal segments. On the abdomen it is flanked by dark brown to almost black spots on these tergites. The underside is characterized by a longitudinal keel, which is very clearly visible on the mesosternum and metasternum and less clearly on the sternites of the abdomen.

== Way of life and reproduction ==
As with all Obrimini, the eggs, which are 4.5 to 4.6 millimetres (0.18 to 0.18 in) mm long, 2.2 to 2.3 millimetres (0.087 to 0.091 in) mm wide and 2.5 to 2.6 millimetres (0.098 to 0.102 in) high, are laid in the ground using the laying spine at the end of the abdomen (ovipositor) deposited at a depth of only 1 to 2 centimetres (0.39 to 0.79 in). Their shell is mostly grey-brown. The upper quarter and operculum are dark gray to black and densely covered with short bristles. The micropylar plate has three wings, like in most Obrimini. The poterolateral wings are arched below and then strongly drawn upwards. Such upwardly curved side wings are otherwise only known from Trachyaretaon mangyan and Trachyaretaon tumandok. The micropyle lies in a notch in the lower middle wing. The nymphs hatch from the eggs after about three months. The almost white abdominal spot typical of the adult females can already be clearly seen on the otherwise bright green L1 nymphs. It still occurs here in both genders. The body surface of the younger nymphal stages is significantly spinier than that of the imagines. On the sides and middle of their abdominal segments there are large, triangular lobes that extend backwards. Males need five months and females around six months to become adults. Another five to six weeks later they begin laying eggs.

== Taxonomy ==
- - Eubulides
  - - Trachyaretaon negrosanon**
      (Obrimini sp. 'Negros')*
    - - Sungaya
      - Trachyaretaon

Position of Trachyaretaon negrosanon to the other representatives of Trachyaretaon and their sister genera according to Sarah Bank et al. (2021), *original species assignment, **species assignment updated according to Frank Hennemann (2023)

In May 2008, Jeffebeck Arimas collected animals initially called as Trachyaretaon sp. 'Negros'. According to genetic analysis by Sarah Bank et al. published in 2021, this species does not belong to Trachyaretaon. It is more closely related to Sungaya. As early as 2011, an accidental hybridization occurred, with Sungaya aeta. The two female hybrids showed a combination of the white abdominal spot typical of Trachyaretaon negrosanon and the white bands on the femurs that occur in Sungaya aeta. They grew into adults but did not produce any eggs. Frank H. Hennemann described the species as Trachyaretaon negrosanon in 2023. The specific name is dedicated to the cultural group of the Negrosano, which stands for Negrenses in Cebuano language. This group is native to the provinces of Negros Occidental and Negros Oriental in Negros and on the island of Siquijor. A female collected by Arimas from Mount Kanlaon is deposited as holotype in the Museum of Natural Sciences in Brussels. Another eight females and nine males bred by Joachim Bresseel are also deposited in Brussels as paratypes. Other paratypes from Hennemann's breeding are deposited in his collection. These are 20 females, 29 males and 50 eggs. Trachyaretaon negrosanon is morphologically very similar to Trachyaretaon tumandok, which is native to Panay and is presumably most closely related to it.

== In terraristics ==
The first representatives of this species found their way into the terrariums of enthusiasts in 2008/2009. Eggs from specimens collected by Arimas in May 2008 in Negros Occidental Province were incubated by Bruno Kneubühler in Switzerland. The species was introduced to Europe for the first time in 2009 and named Trachyaretaon sp. 'Negros' distributed.

Trachyaretaon negrosanon is easy to feed in the terrarium with the leaves of bramble, hazel, rhododendrons, ivy or beech. To enable egg laying, the bottom of the terrarium should be covered a few centimeters high with a slightly moist substrate of soil.

== Gallery ==
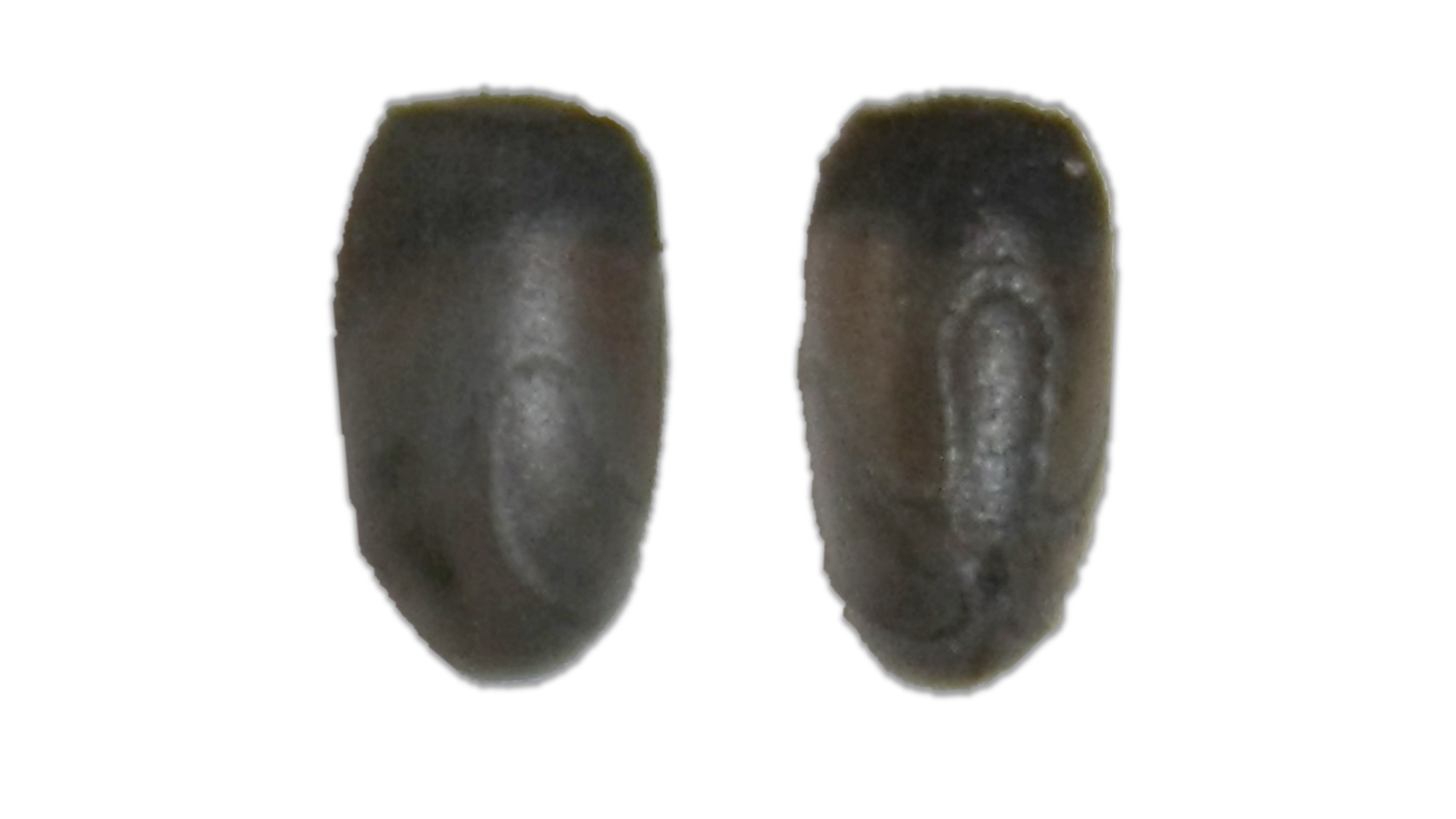
Eggs in lateral and dorsal view

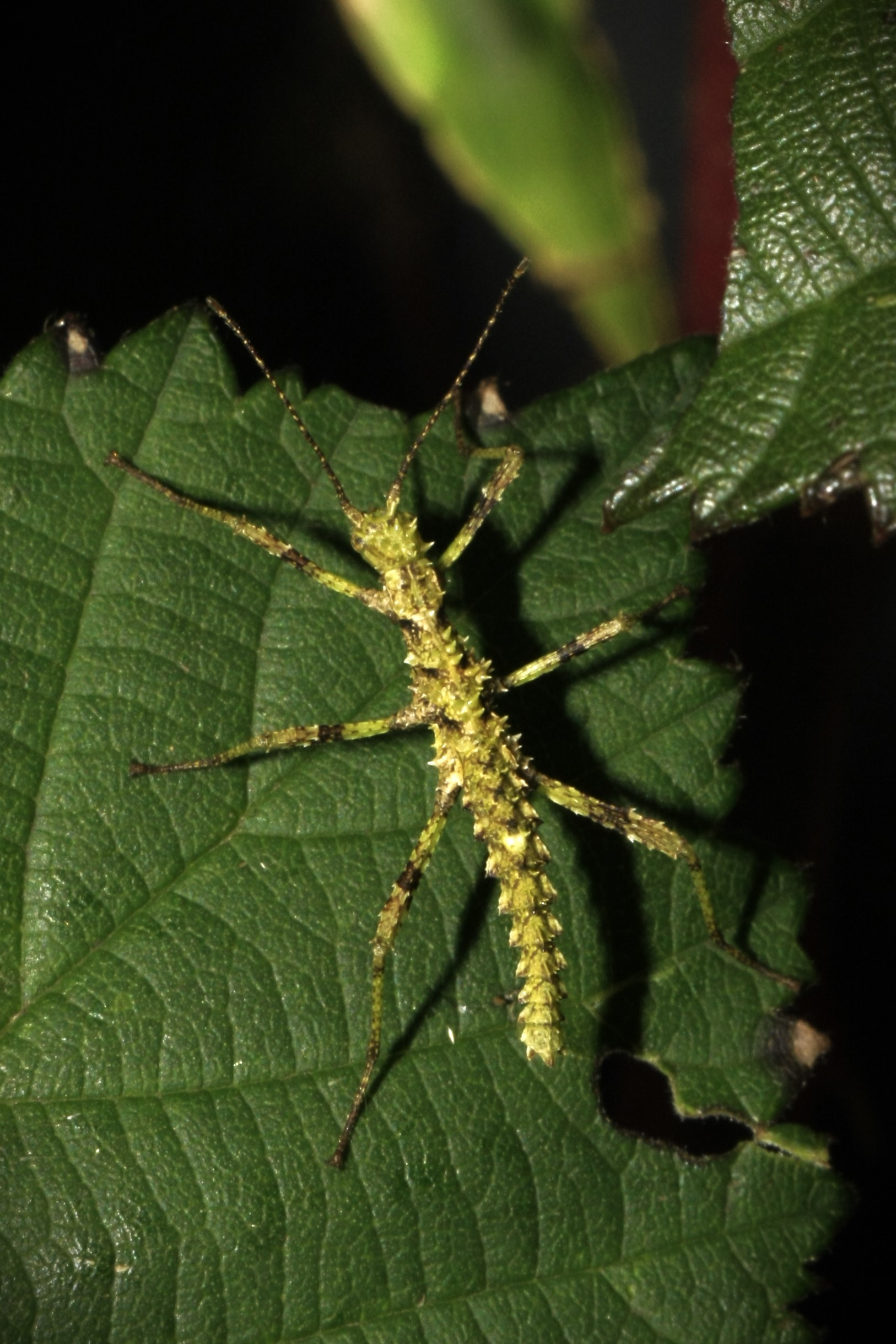
L1 nymph

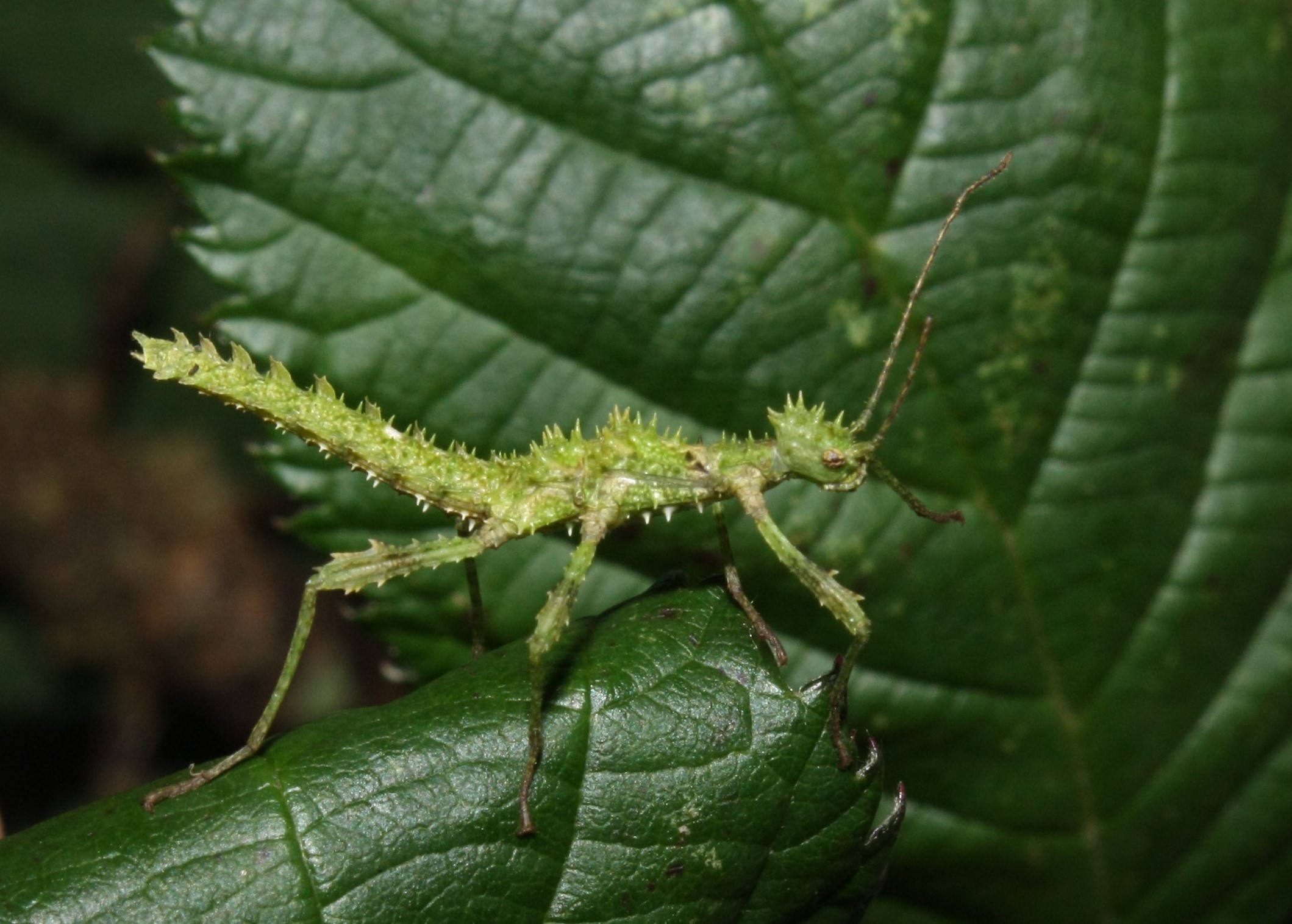
Nymph laterally

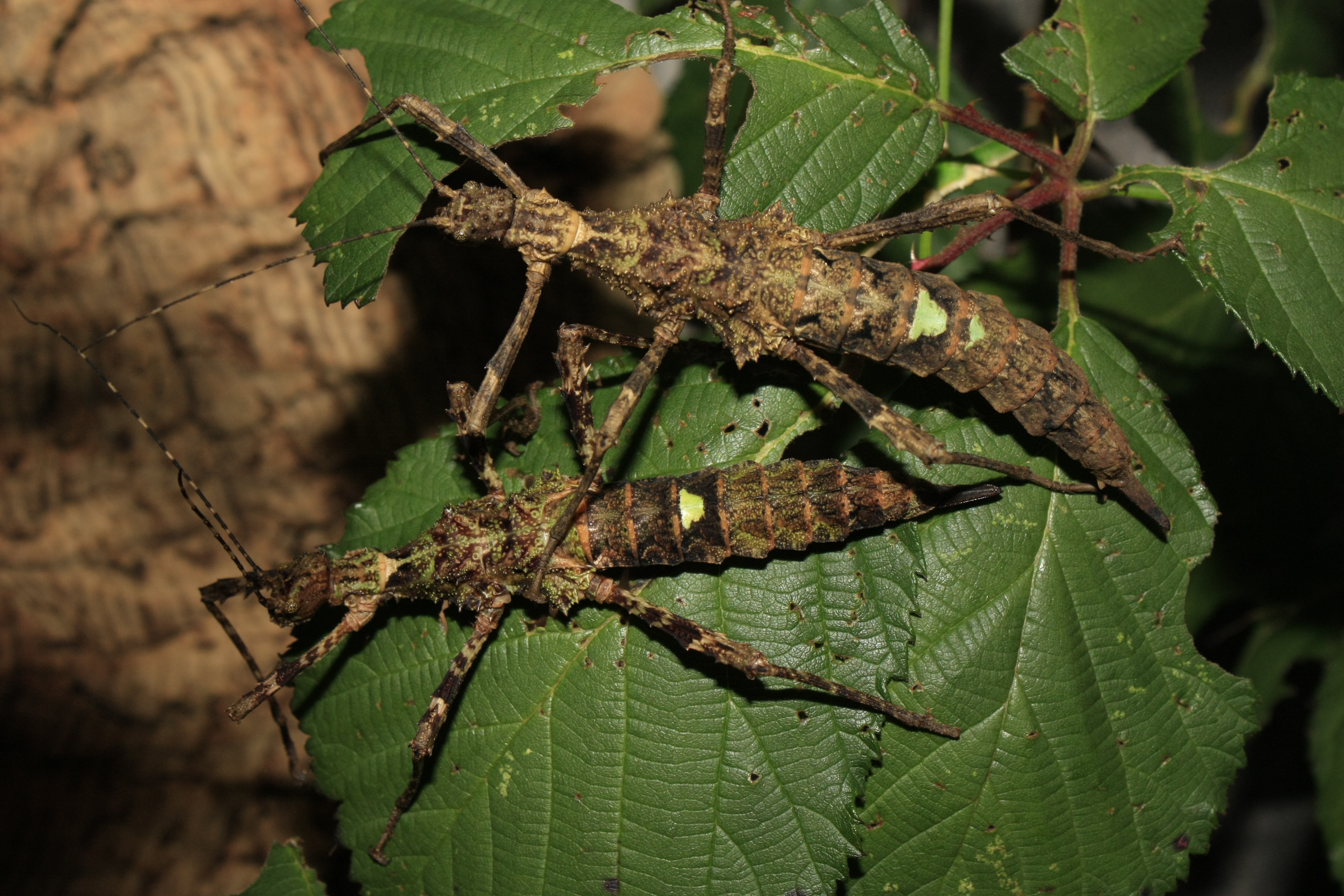
females, with one and with two white spots at the abdomen

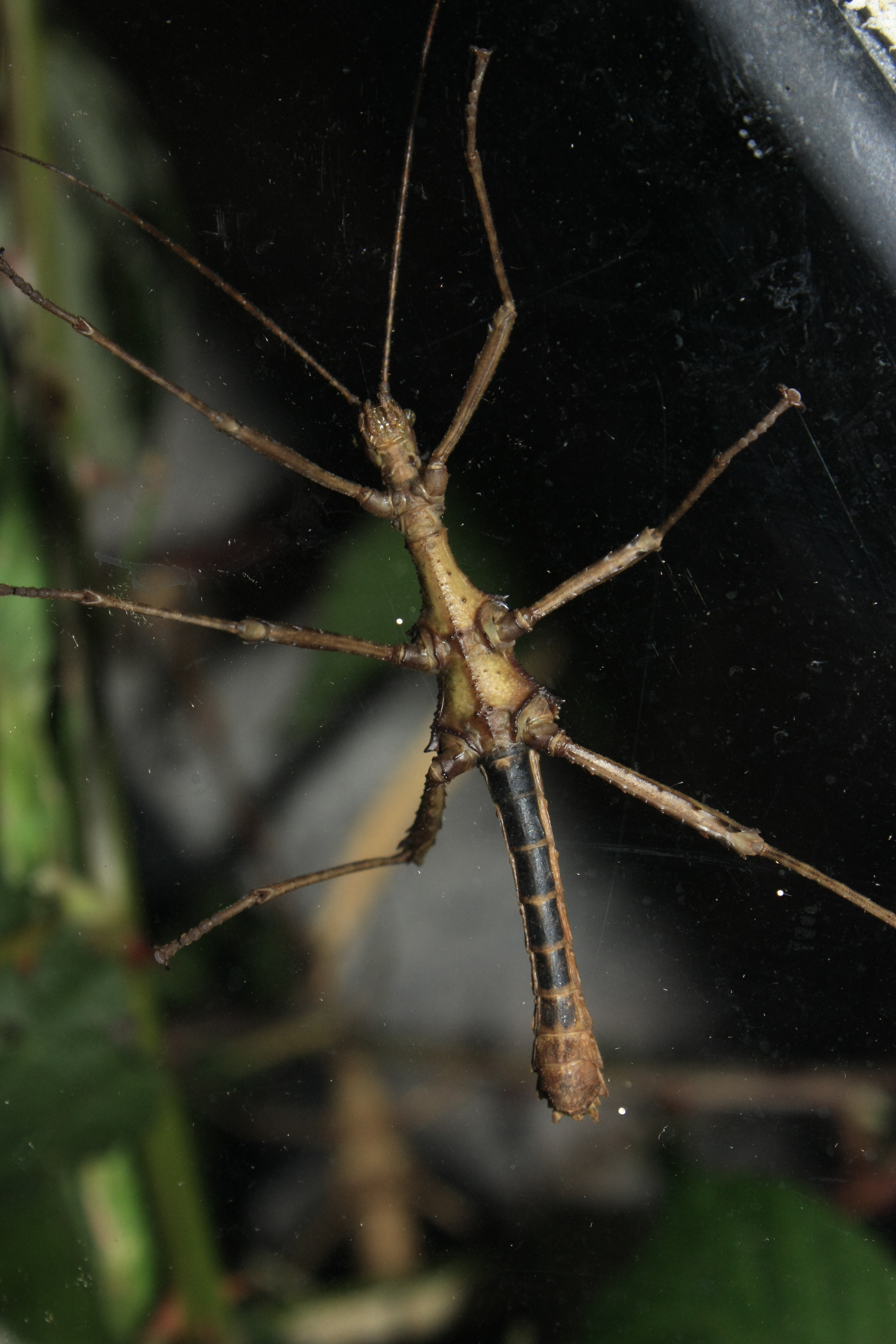
Underside of a male with view to the black sternites.
