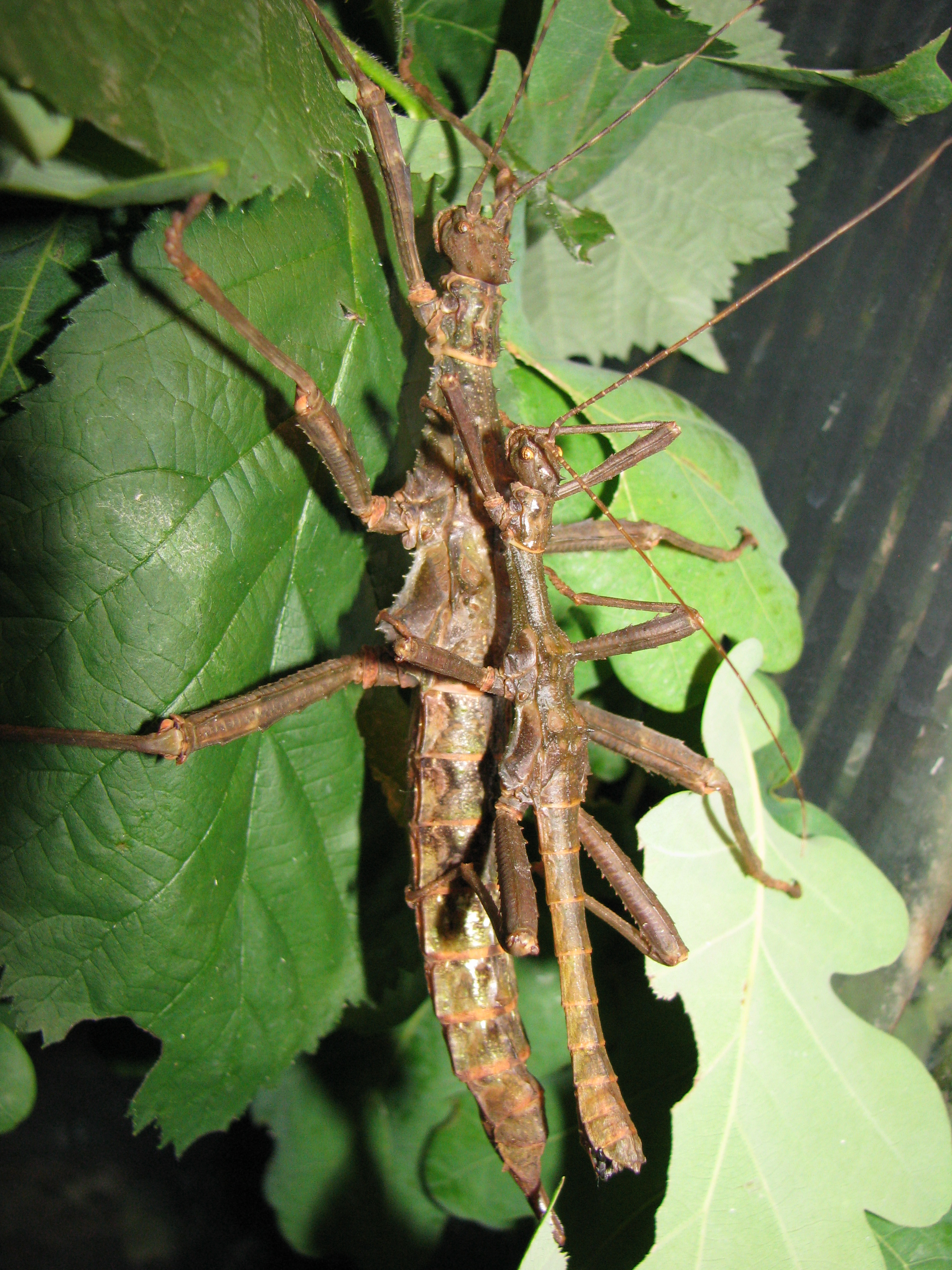
- Trachyaretaon carmelae, pair

Scientific classification
- Kingdom: Animalia
- Phylum: Arthropoda
- Class: Insecta
- Order: Phasmatodea
- Family: Heteropterygidae
- Subfamily: Obriminae
- Tribe: Obrimini
- Genus: Trachyaretaon
- Species: T. carmelae

Binomial name
- Trachyaretaon carmelae Lit & Eusebio, 2005

Synonyms
- Trachyaretaon brueckneri Conle & Hennemann, 2006

= Trachyaretaon carmelae =

Species of stick insect

Trachyaretaon carmelae is a species of stick insects. It is one of the largest in the subfamily Obriminae. The sometimes used common name is Carmela's stick insect.

== Characteristics ==
Females reach a length of 135 millimetres (5.3 in). At 75 millimetres (3.0 in) in length, males remain significantly smaller. The animals have yellow eyes and are mostly light to dark brown in color. Occasionally specimens appear with reddish (mostly female) or greenish (mostly male) brown tones. The rear edges of the abdomen segments and of the prothorax are lighter, orange-brown or pinkish-brown in color. Females occasionally have one or two white abdominal segments and often small white areas on the thorax (for example, paired white spots on the mesothorax). The habitus corresponds to that of the rest of the genus. The lateral edges of the meso- and metathorax are keeled and clearly jagged (serrated). Both thoracic segments become wider towards the rear, with the rear edge of the mesothorax being significantly wider than the front edge of the metathorax, the rear edge of which is the widest part of the body. On the meso- and metathorax there is a pair of very short spines, which form the highest point of the thorax and are surrounded by inconspicuous, small spines. Overall, adult specimens are less spiny than many other members of the genus and have a relatively smooth and shiny body surface.

== Distribution and taxonomy ==
Trachyaretaon carmelae is native to the Philippine province of Cagayan, where it has been found both in the north of the island of Luzon, specifically in Santa Ana, and on the Babuyan Islands of Dalupiri and Calayan, located north of Luzon.

Ireneo L. Lit, Jr. and Orlando L. Eusebio described the species in 2005 from animals collected the previous year on the island of Dalupiri and deposited a female as holotype, as well as various paratypes, including males, nymphs and eggs, at the University of the Philippines in Los Baños, Laguna. They named the species after Carmela S. Española, who found the holotype while accompanying the Babuyan expedition team.

As early as 2003, animals were collected on the neighboring Calayan Island that were described by Oskar V. Conle and Frank H. Hennemann as Trachyaretaon brueckneri. The specific epithet was chosen in honor of Martin Brückner, a Munich biologist and friend of the authors. A male animal was deposited as a holotype in the Bavarian State Collection of Zoology in Munich. The name was announced on various websites including photos of the species before the publication of the species description. Lit and Eusebio mentioned this in the description of Trachyaretaon carmelae. They distinguish their species from Trachyaretaon brueckneri only by a bright drawing of the fifth abdominal segment. The description of Trachyaretaon brueckneri was only published in 2006 due to delays in its publication. It quickly became clear that both were representatives of the same species and that the name assigned by Lit and Eusebio should be given priority based on the previously published description. Trachyaretaon brueckneri has since been referred to as Trachyaretaon carmelae by both the authors of the species and those of other works, before being formally synonymized by Hennemann in 2023.

== Way of life and reproduction ==
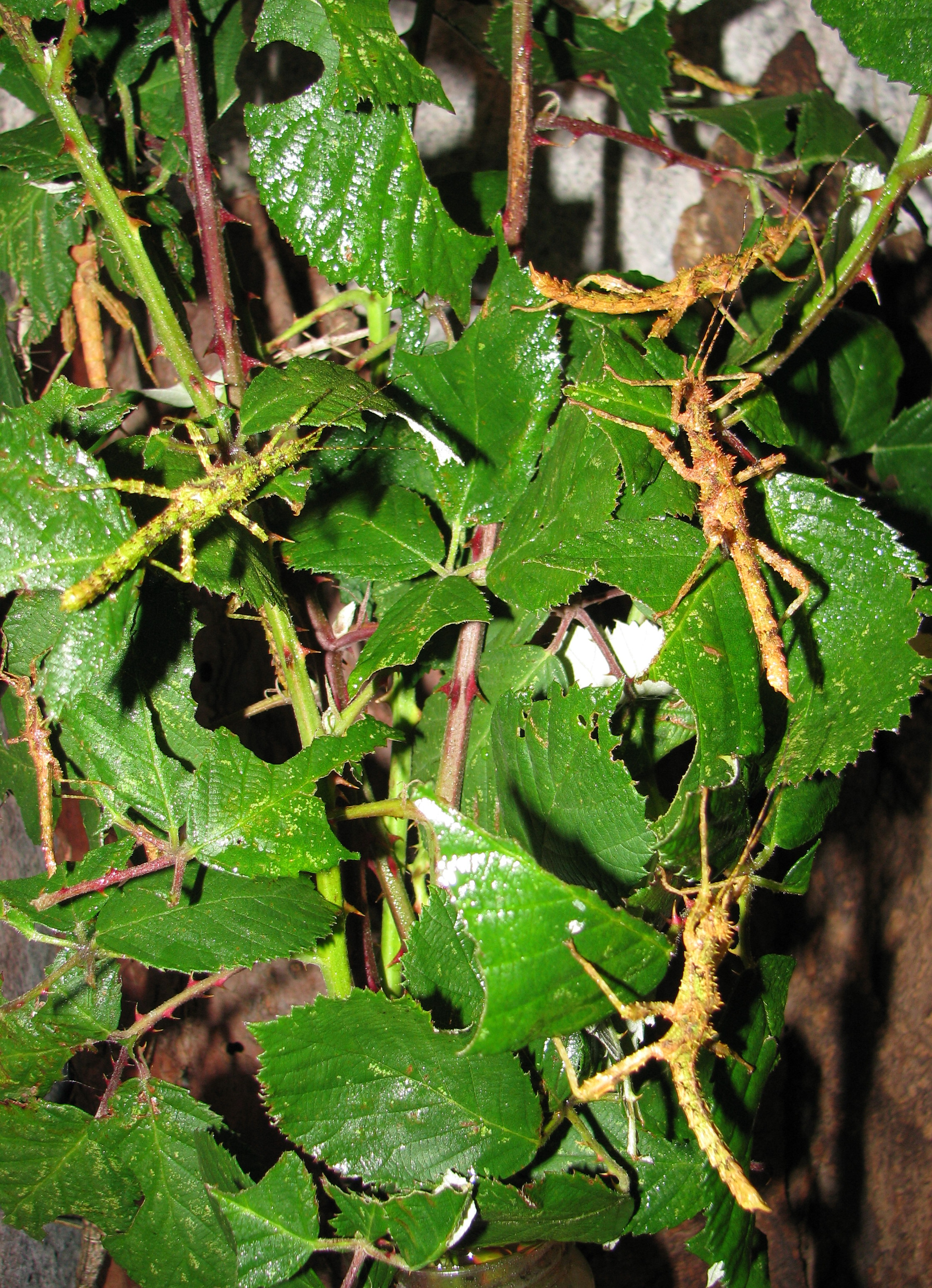
different colored nymphs

The nocturnal and twilight-active animals usually sit on the food plants. The adult males can often be carried around by the females for weeks. In the absence of adult females, they also mount the females of other members of the tribe Obrimini. During the mating the male pushes a greenish colored seed carrier (spermatophore) under the subgenital plate of the female. The cylindrical, about 5 millimetres (0.20 in) long and about 3 millimetres (0.12 in) wide, dark brown eggs are laid in the ground by the female using the slightly curved secondary ovipositor. They resemble the animals' own droppings and are strongly reminiscent of those of other Obrimini such as Aretaon asperrimus, of which they only resemble the hard to recognize, an upside down "Y" micropylar plate distinguish. At the front pole of the eggs there is a circular lid (operculum), which the nymphs push on when they hatch three to four months after laying the eggs. The very variably colored nymphs grow into adults over the next seven months. The Imago then live another five to eight months.

== In terraristics ==
Trachyaretaon carmelae does not make high demands on the keeping conditions in the terrarium. It can easily be fed on the leaves of bramble. In addition, oak, firethorn, ivy and hazel are also accepted. A slightly moist soil layer a few centimeters thick or a correspondingly filled flower pot must be present in the terrarium to enable the females to lay their eggs. Temperatures from 22 °C (72 °F) and a humidity of 75%, which can be achieved by regular spraying with water, are sufficient for breeding.

The species is listed by the Phasmid Study Group under PSG number 255 and will continue to be referred to as Trachyaretaon brueckneri, as the breeding stock goes back to the specimens introduced by Conle and Hennemann, it must be correctly referred to as Trachyaretaon carmelae 'Calayan Island'. A female's bite in the wrist has been documented by Philip Edward Bragg, a behavior which is rather unusual for stick insects.

== Gallery ==
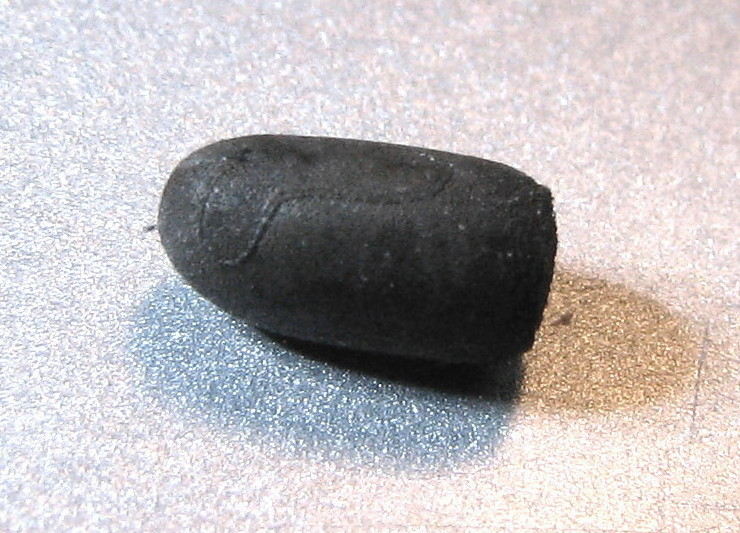
Egg

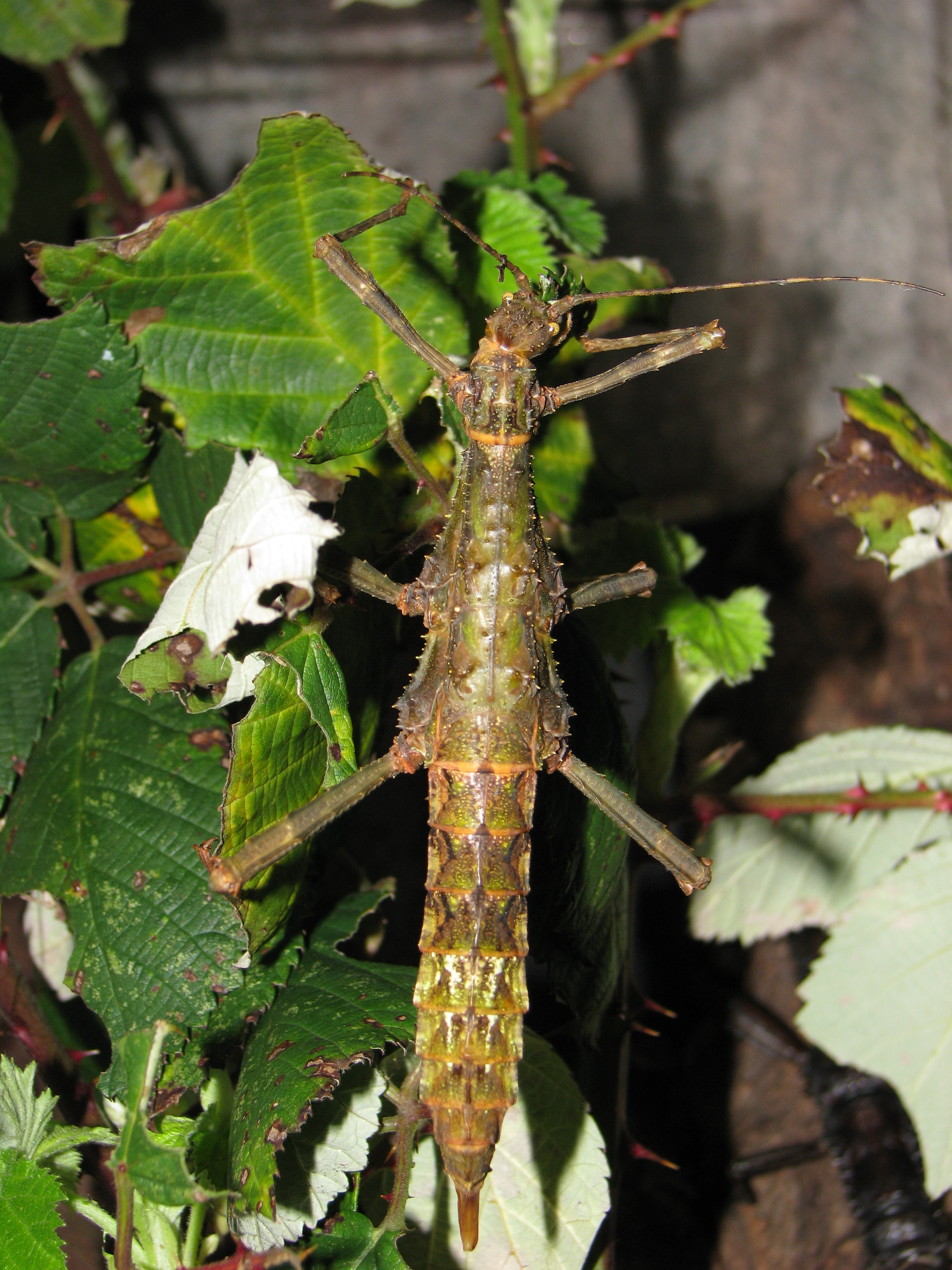
Female

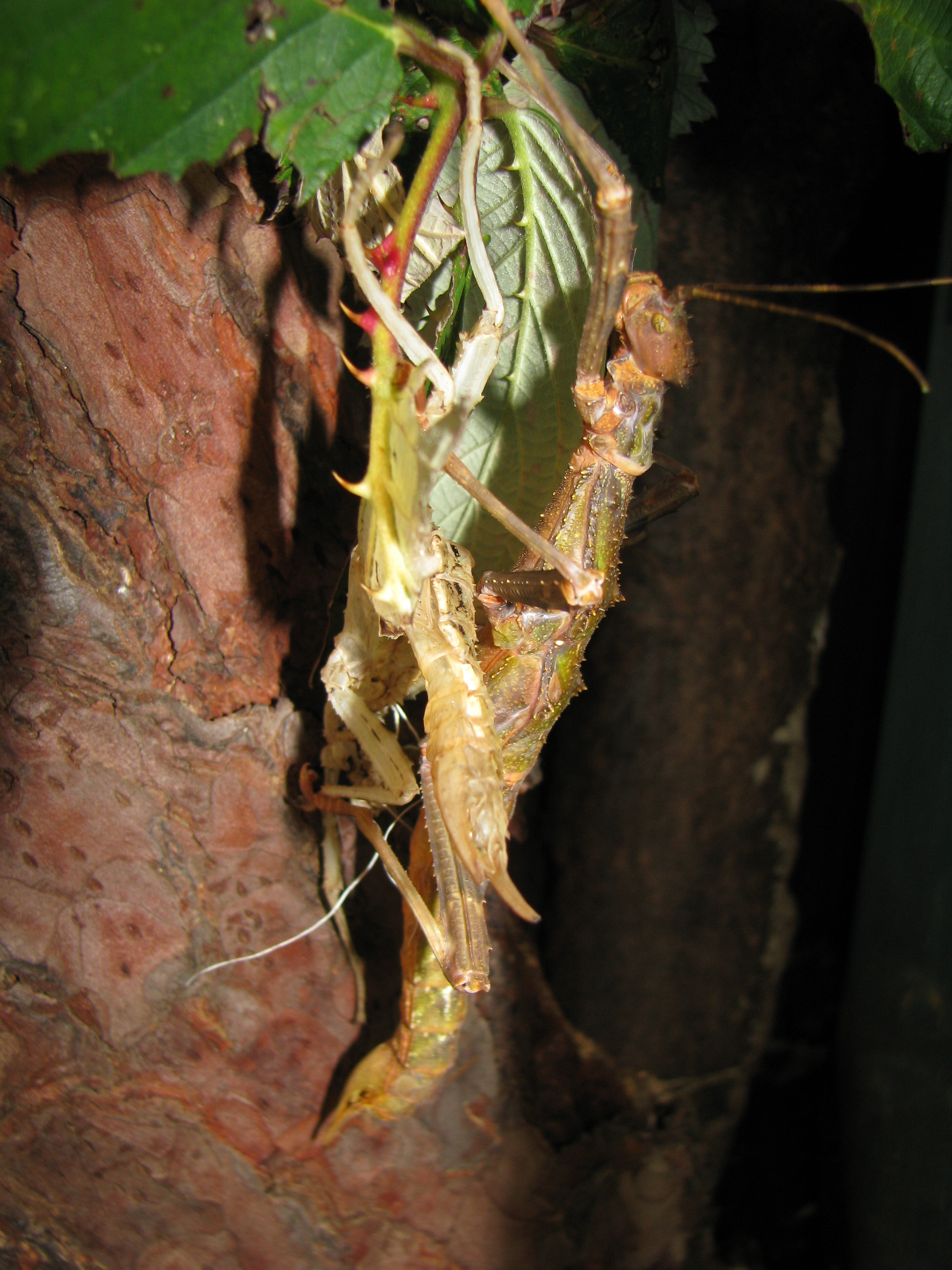
Female at an exuviae

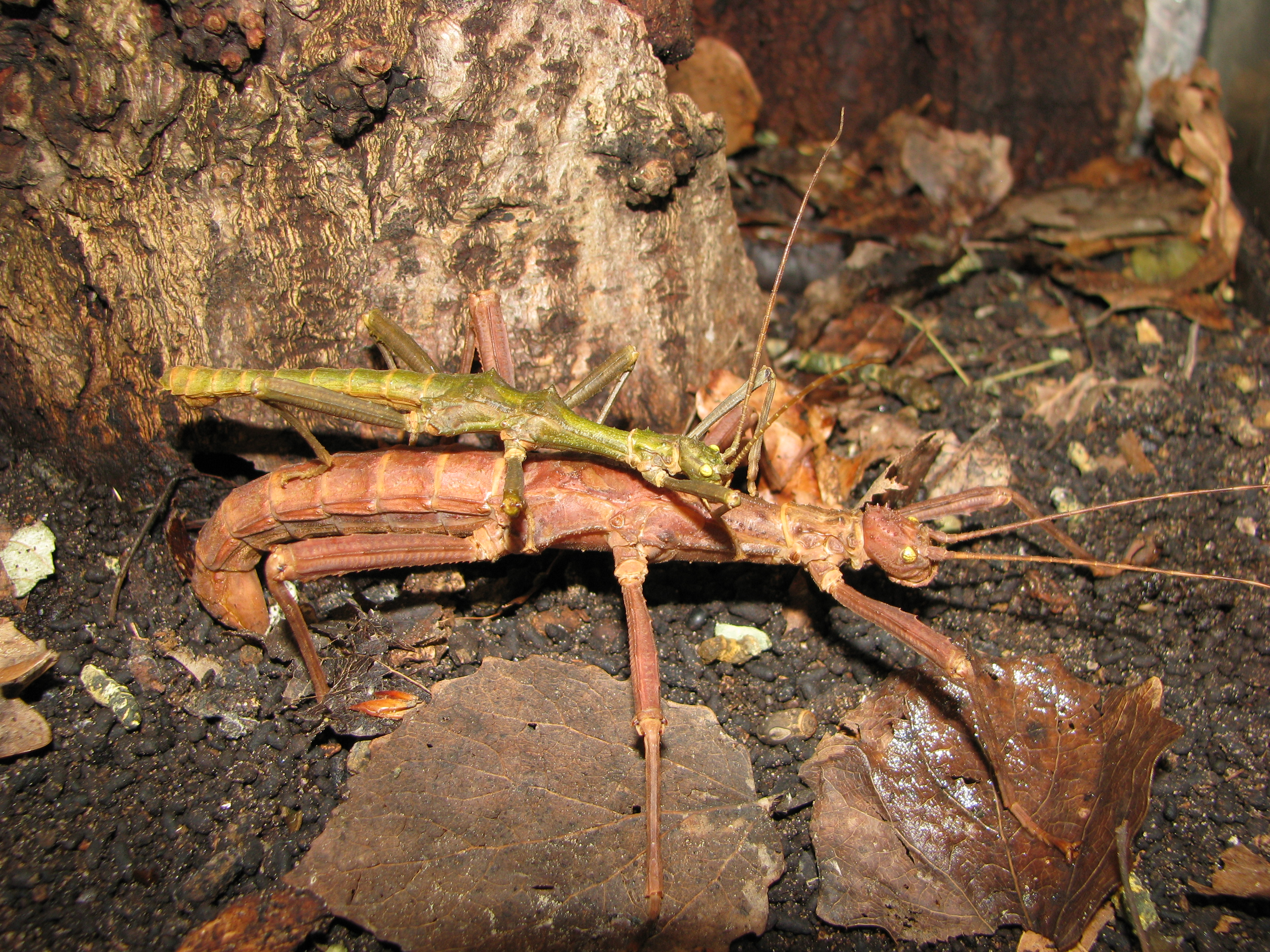
Pair with egg-laying female
