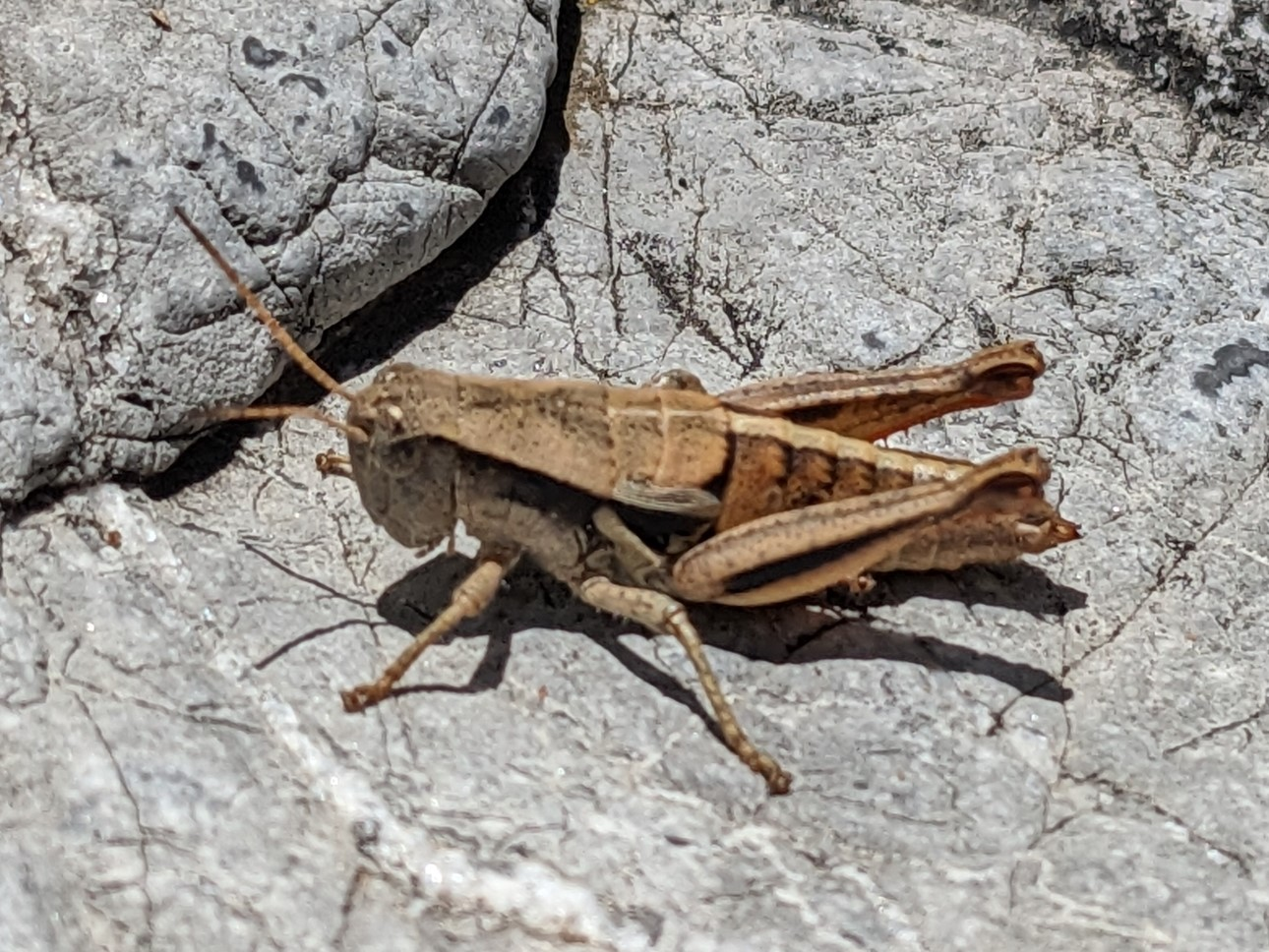

Conservation status
- Apparently Secure (NatureServe)

Scientific classification
- Kingdom: Animalia
- Phylum: Arthropoda
- Class: Insecta
- Order: Orthoptera
- Suborder: Caelifera
- Family: Acrididae
- Tribe: Conalcaeini
- Genus: Conalcaea
- Species: C. huachucana

Binomial name
- Conalcaea huachucana Rehn, 1907

= Conalcaea huachucana =

Species of grasshopper

Conalcaea huachucana, the Huachuca grasshopper, is a species of spur-throated grasshopper in the family Acrididae. It is found in Mexico and the Southwestern United States.

== Subspecies ==
These two subspecies belong to the species Conalcaea huachucana:

- Conalcaea huachucana coyoterae Hebard, 1922
- Conalcaea huachucana huachucana Rehn, 1907
