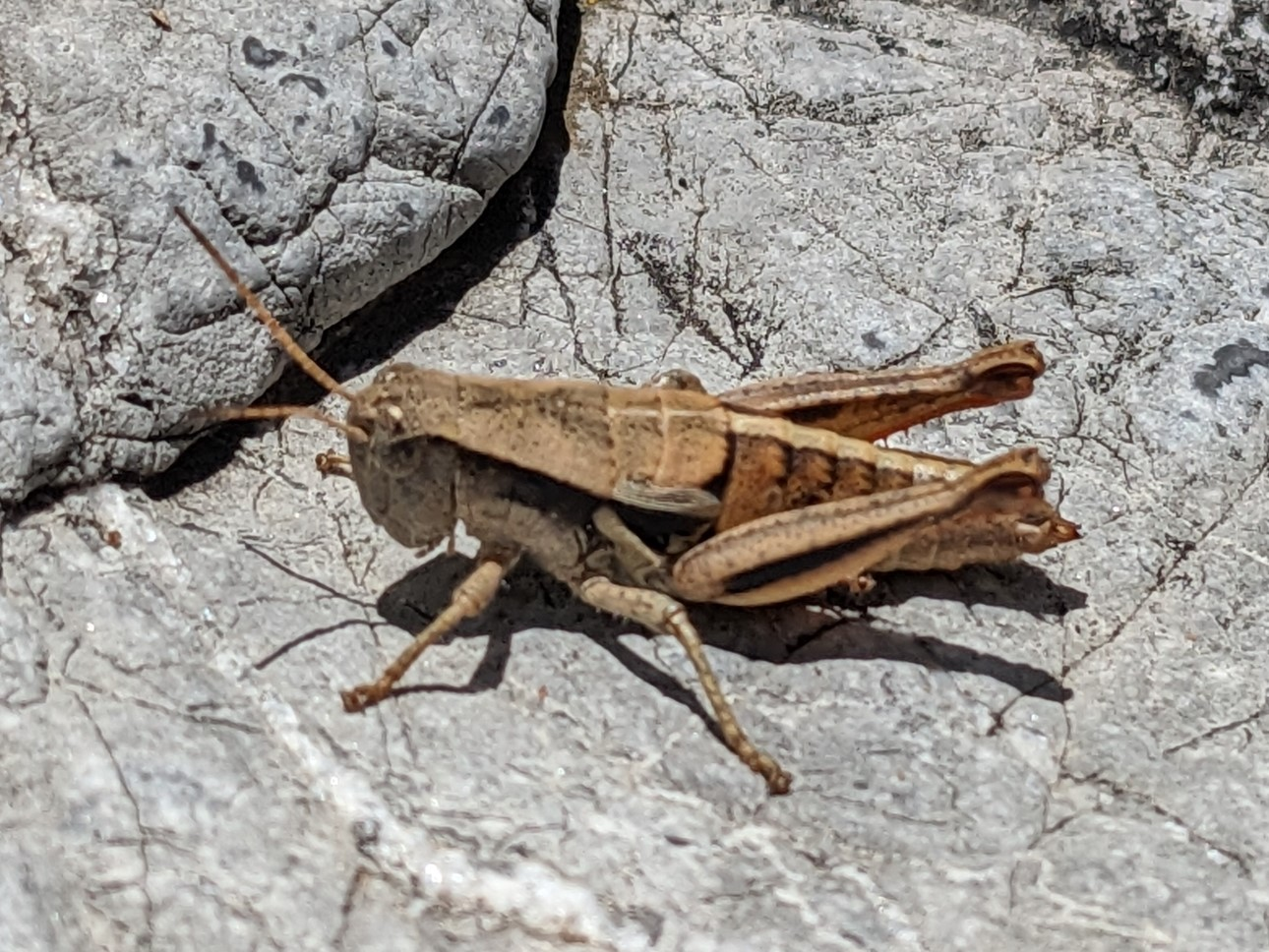
- Conalcaea huachucana

Scientific classification
- Kingdom: Animalia
- Phylum: Arthropoda
- Class: Insecta
- Order: Orthoptera
- Suborder: Caelifera
- Family: Acrididae
- Subfamily: Melanoplinae
- Tribe: Conalcaeini
- Genus: Conalcaea; Scudder, 1897

= Conalcaea =

Genus of grasshoppers

Conalcaea is a genus of spur-throated grasshoppers in the family Acrididae. They occur in Mexico and the Southwestern United States.

== Species ==
There are three recognized species:

- Conalcaea cantralli Gurney, 1951
- Conalcaea huachucana Rehn, 1907 – Huachuca grasshopper
- Conalcaea miguelitana Scudder, 1897
