= Conalcaea cantralli =

Conservation status
- Imperiled (NatureServe)

Scientific classification
- Kingdom: Animalia
- Phylum: Arthropoda
- Class: Insecta
- Order: Orthoptera
- Suborder: Caelifera
- Family: Acrididae
- Tribe: Conalcaeini
- Genus: Conalcaea
- Species: C. cantralli

Binomial name
- Conalcaea cantralli Gurney, 1951

Species of grasshopper

Conalcaea cantralli is a species of spur-throated grasshopper in the family Acrididae. It is found in Arizona (Southwestern United States).
